= Death Race (franchise) =

Science fiction action media franchise

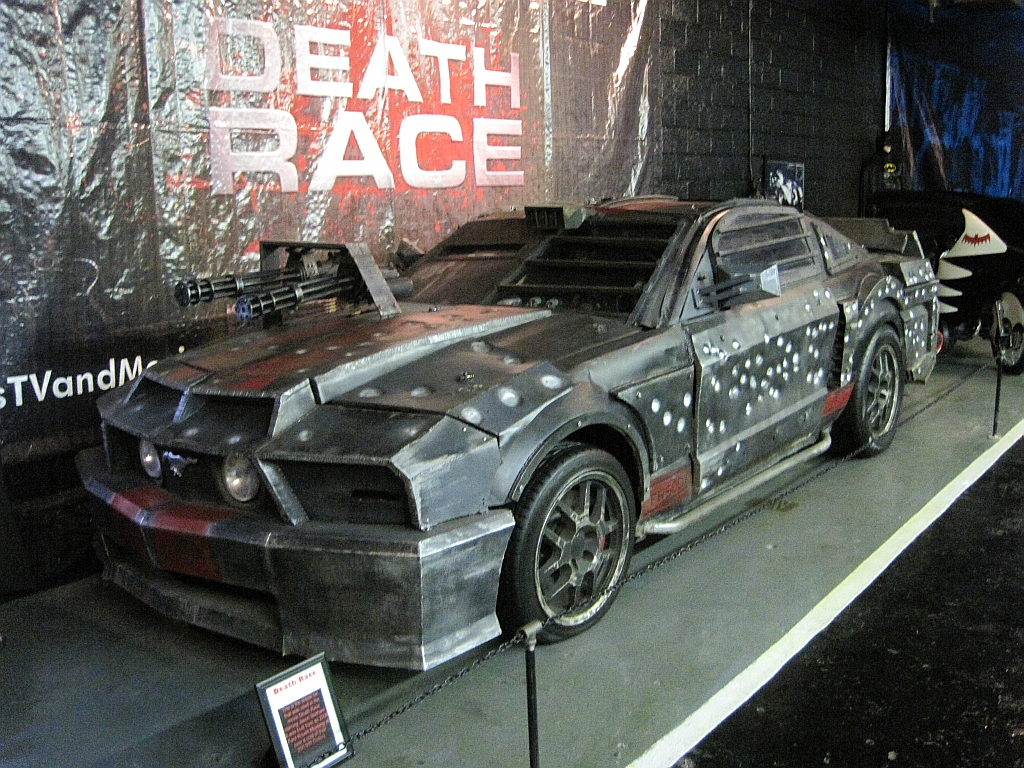
- A 2006 Ford Mustang GT modified, Jensen "Frankenstein" Ames' car, used in Death Race (2008).
- Created by: Ib Melchior
- Original work: The Racer (1956)
- Owners: New World Pictures (1975); Universal Pictures (2008–2018)
- Years: 1956–2018

Print publications
- Comics: Death Race 2020 (1995)

Films and television
- Film(s): Death Race 2000 (1975); Death Race (2008); Death Race 2 (2010); Death Race 3: Inferno (2013); Death Race 2050 (2017); Death Race: Beyond Anarchy (2018)

The Death Race series is a car combat franchise encompassing a series of films and other media centered on a reality show set in a prison, where inmates race against each other in order to win their freedom.

== Films ==
Death Race story chronology
Original continuity
- Death Race 2000 (1975)
- Death Race 2050 (2017)
Remake continuity
- Death Race 2 (2010)
- Death Race 3: Inferno (2013)
- Death Race (2008)
- Death Race: Beyond Anarchy (2018)

=== Death Race 2000 (1975) ===
Death Race 2000 is a 1975 cult action film. It stars David Carradine, Simone Griffeth, Sylvester Stallone, Louisa Moritz, and Don Steele, and was directed by Paul Bartel. In the near future, the ultimate sporting event is the Death Race. Contestants score points for running people down as they speed across the country. The sport has crazed fans who sacrifice themselves to the drivers. A covert group is trying to bring an end to the immoral Death Race and has infiltrated one of their followers into the race as a navigator of the top driver. In the end, the lives of the competitors, the President and the Death Race itself are in peril.

The screenplay was based on the short story "The Racer" by Ib Melchior.

=== Death Race (2008) ===
Death Race is a 2008 reboot of Death Race 2000. It stars Jason Statham, Tyrese Gibson, Ian McShane, Joan Allen, Fred Koehler, Robin Shou, and David Carradine, and was directed by Paul W. S. Anderson. In the DVD commentary, Anderson further elaborates on his thought of the movie as a prequel more than a reboot. In 2012, the economy of the US collapses, causing unemployment and crime rates to skyrocket, and a sharp increase of convicted criminals, which leads to privatized prisons for profit. In 2020, Claire Hennessey (Joan Allen), the warden of Terminal Island Penitentiary, earns profits from the pay-per-view broadcast of a modern gladiator game called the "Death Race", with the prisoners as the players. The racers, along with their navigators, drive a three-part race over three days on a closed track at Terminal Island, with various pressure plates: swords activate the racers' offensive weapons, shields activate defensive weapons such as oil, smoke, and napalm, and skulls ("Death Heads") activate deadly metal traps which rise up from the track. The reward for the drivers is that if one racer wins five races, they will be granted their freedom by Warden Hennessey.

=== Death Race 2 (2010) ===
Death Race 2 is a prequel to the 2008 film Death Race. It stars Luke Goss, Fred Koehler, Tanit Phoenix, Robin Shou, Lauren Cohan, Danny Trejo, Ving Rhames, and Sean Bean, and was directed by Roel Reiné. Getaway driver Carl "Luke" Lucas (Luke Goss) is arrested after a robbery for his crime boss Markus Kane (Sean Bean) goes wrong. As his accomplices are robbing the bank, two police officers casually enter the building. Luke tells his accomplices to abort, but they refuse; Luke intervenes, resulting in the death of one of the three accomplices. Luke shoots and kills one of the officers and dumps off his accomplices in order to fulfill Markus's wishes. In doing so, Luke is eventually captured by the police following a high-speed chase and sentenced to serve time on Terminal Island. Markus, worried that Luke will trade info on his crimes for immunity, discovers his location and orders his men to take Luke out.

=== Death Race 3: Inferno (2013) ===
Death Race 3: Inferno takes place between the events of Death Race 2 and Death Race. It stars Luke Goss, Danny Trejo, Tanit Phoenix, Fred Koehler, Robin Shou, Ving Rhames, and Dougray Scott, and was directed by Roel Reiné. Death Race owner R. H. Weyland (Ving Rhames) has been forced to sell the rights to Niles York (Dougray Scott), a British billionaire who acquired the rights by hostile takeover. York reveals that he intends to relocate the Death Race to the deserts of Africa. Before leaving, Weyland arranges Lucas to have surgery to heal the infected and deadly scars on his face sustained from the previous film Death Race 2. With Carl Lucas, a.k.a. Frankenstein (Luke Goss), one win away from gaining his freedom, York coaches Lucas to lose his race and threatens his life if he fails to comply.

=== Death Race 2050 (2017) ===
Corman made Death Race 2050, a sequel to his original film, shooting in Peru starting in February 2016. It stars Malcolm McDowell, Manu Bennett, Burt Grinstead, Marci Miller, Folake Olowofoyeku, Anessa Ramsey, Yancy Butler, and Charlie Farrell, and was directed by G. J. Echternkamp. The film was released in the United States on DVD and DVD/Blu-ray combo on Jan 17, 2017, with three making-of documentaries: The Making of 2050, Cars! Cars! Cars!, and The Look of 2050. In 2050, the United Corporations of America is ruled supreme by "Mr. President". An annual event called "The Death Race" is watched by almost all the inhabitants. This event, where anything goes, mixes car racing, murder of participants and civilians, all broadcast on television. The winner wins the supreme title and the right to have one of his wishes granted. The champion of this race and favorite of this new edition is still Frankenstein, half-man and half-robot. At the end of this race, he hopes to finally be able to bow out and leave this system. But that's without counting on the betrayals, attacks from resistance fighters and participants that await him this year.

=== Death Race: Beyond Anarchy (2018) ===
Death Race: Beyond Anarchy is a sequel to the 2008 film Death Race, directed by Don Michael Paul and stars Zach McGowan, Danny Glover, Christine Marzano, Danny Trejo, Fred Koehler, and Lorina Kamburova. Now considered illegal by Weyland International, the Death Race is still practiced in the prison city Sprawl and broadcast on the dark web. It is the legendary pilot Frankenstein who has taken control of the place, where nearly 420,000 inmates are locked up. After a failed attack on the latter, the authorities send Connor Gibson, a member of an elite unit, to infiltrate the prison. He has only one goal: to stop the Death Race. He will then have to learn to fight in a world without faith or law.

== Cast and crew ==
=== Principal cast ===
Character	Original series		Remake series			
Character	Death Race 2000	Death Race 2050	Death Race	Death Race 2	Death Race 3: Inferno	Death Race: Beyond Anarchy
Character	1975	2017	2008	2010	2013	2018
"Frankenstein"	David Carradine	Manu Bennett	Jason Statham David Carradine (voice-over)	Luke Goss	Luke Goss Dougray Scott	Velislav Pavlov Nolan North (voice-over)
Annie Smith	Simone Griffeth	Marci Miller				
Joe "Machine Gun" Viterbo	Sylvester Stallone					
Mr. President	Sandy McCallum	Malcolm McDowell				
Myra	Louisa Moritz					
Jed Perfectus		Burt Grinstead				
Minerva Jefferson		Folake Olowofoyeku				
Tammy		Anessa Ramsey				
Alexis Hamilton		Yancy Butler				
J.B.		Charlie Farrell				
Grace Tickle		Shanna Olson				
The Commercial			Dick Ervasti (voice)	Dick Ervasti (voice)	Dick Ervasti (voice)	
"Lists"			Frederick Koehler	Frederick Koehler	Frederick Koehler	Frederick Koehler
"14K"			Robin Shou	Robin Shou	Robin Shou	
Jensen Ames			Jason Statham			
Warden Claire Hennessey			Joan Allen	Photograph	Archive footage	
Joe "Machine Gun Joe" Mason			Tyrese Gibson			
"Coach"			Ian McShane		Photograph	
Casey "Case"			Natalie Martinez			
Gunner			Jacob Vargas			
Ulrich			Jason Clarke			
Slovo Pachenko			Max Ryan			
Hector "The Grim Reaper" Grimm			Robert LaSardo			
Travis Colt			Justin Mader			
Niles York			David Carradine		Dougray Scott	
Carl "Luke" Lucas				Luke Goss	Luke Goss	
Katrina Banks				Tanit Phoenix	Tanit Phoenix	
Goldberg				Danny Trejo	Danny Trejo	Danny Trejo
R. H. Weyland				Ving Rhames	Ving Rhames	
September Jones				Lauren Cohan		
Markus Kane				Sean Bean		
Bill "Big Bill"				Deobia Oparei		
Warden Medford Parks				Patrick Lyster		
Rocco				Joe Vaz		
Xander Grady				Henie Bosman		
Calin				Warrick Grier		
Billy "Hillbilly" Hill				Sean Higgs		
"Apache"				Chase Armitage		
"Sheik"				Michael Solomon		
"Scarface"				Trayan Milenov-Troy		
Satana Diabolos					Hlubi Mboya	
"Razor"					Bart Fouche	
"Psycho"					Jeremy Crutchley	
Nero					Eugene Khumbanyiwa	
Olga Braun					Michelle van Schaik	
"Joker"					Mark Elderkin	
"Pretty Boy"					Brandon Livanos	
"Jackal"					Anton David Jeftha	
Connor Gibson						Zach McGowan
Bob "Baltimore Bob"						Danny Glover
Jane						Christine Marzano
Rose "Gypsy Rose"						Yennis Cheung
Bexie						Cassie Clare
Carley						Lucy Aarden
Mr. Valentine						Terence Maynard
The Warden						Cameron Jack

=== Additional crew ===
Role	Film					
Role	Original series		Remake series			
Role	Death Race 2000	Death Race 2050	Death Race	Death Race 2	Death Race 3: Inferno	Death Race: Beyond Anarchy
Role	1975	2017	2008	2010	2013	2018
Director	Paul Bartel	G. J. Echternkamp	Paul W. S. Anderson	Roel Reiné	Roel Reiné	Don Michael Paul
Screenwriter(s)	Robert Thom; Charles Griffith	G. J. Echternkamp; Matt Yamashita	Paul W. S. Anderson	Tony Giglio	Tony Giglio	Tony Giglio; Don Michael Paul
Story by	Robert Thom; Charles Griffith	G. J. Echternkamp; Matt Yamashita	Paul W. S. Anderson	Paul W. S. Anderson; Tony Giglio	Paul W. S. Anderson; Tony Giglio	Paul W. S. Anderson; Tony Giglio
Producer(s)	Roger Corman; Jim Weatherill	Roger Corman	Paul W. S. Anderson; Jeremy Bolt; Roger Corman; Paula Wagner	Paul W. S. Anderson; Jeremy Bolt; Mike Elliott	Paul W. S. Anderson; Jeremy Bolt; Mike Elliott	Mike Elliott; Greg Holstein
Composer	Paul Chihara	Gunter Brown; Cindy Brown	Paul Haslinger	Paul Haslinger	Trevor Morris	Frederik Wiedmann
Director(s) of photography	Tak Fujimoto	Juan Durán	Scott Kevan	John McKay	Wayne Shields	Alexander Krumov
Editor(s)	Tina Hirsch	G. J. Echternkamp; Steve Ansell	Niven Howie	Radu Ion; Herman P. Koerts	Michael Trent; Radu Ion	Vanick Moradian
Production companies	New World Pictures	Universal 1440 Entertainment; New Horizons Pictures	Relativity Media; Cruise/Wagner Productions; Impact Pictures	Universal Pictures Productions GmbH; Moonlighting Death Race Films C.C. Impact Pictures; Chestnut Ridge Productions	Universal 1440 Entertainment; Impact Pictures; Chestnut Ridge Productions	
Distributor	New World Pictures	Universal Studios Home Entertainment	Universal Pictures	Universal Studios Home Entertainment	Universal Studios Home Entertainment	Universal Studios Home Entertainment
Runtime	80 minutes	93 minutes	111 minutes	100 minutes	105 minutes	111 minutes
Release date	April 27, 1975	January 17, 2017	August 22, 2008	December 27, 2010	January 22, 2013	October 2, 2018

== Other media ==
=== Unrelated ===
Deathsport is a 1978 science fiction B-movie produced by Roger Corman, directed by Allan Arkush and Nicholas Niciphor.

=== Comic books ===
A comic book sequel series titled Death Race 2020 was published in April–November 1995 by Roger Corman's short-lived Roger Corman's Cosmic Comics imprint. It was written by Pat Mills of 2000 AD fame, with art by Kevin O'Neill. The pair had already worked together on several comics, including Marshal Law. The comic book series, as the title indicates, takes place 20 years after the film ended and deals with Frankenstein's return to the race. New racers introduced here included Von Dutch, the Alcoholic, Happy the Clown, Steppenwolf, Rick Rhesus and Harry Carrie.

The comic book series lasted eight issues before being cancelled and the story was left unfinished at the end.

=== Video games ===
- The 1976 video game Death Race was inspired by the film Death Race 2000. A remake of the same name was released in 1990 for the Nintendo Entertainment System.
- The video game Maze Death Race, released in 1982 for the ZX81 and in 1983 for the ZX Spectrum, resembles the film by its cover artwork, title, and car-driving content.
- The Carmageddon video game series borrows heavily from the plot, characters, and car designs from the film Death Race 2000.

=== Alien franchise ===
In Death Race 2 (2010) and Death Race 3: Inferno (2013), the character R. H. Weyland (played by Ving Rhames), is the founder of the Weyland Corporation, the company who owns the Terminal Island Penitentiary from the 2008 film. The company is mentioned in the remake series, an allusion to the Alien franchise (despite the involvement of Paul W. S. Anderson, who is the director of Alien vs. Predator (2004), who also directed Death Race and co-wrote the 2008 film's prequels and its 2018 sequel Death Race: Beyond Anarchy). In Alien: Augmented Reality Survival Manual, there is a reference to Weyland-Yutani running prison-based racing circuits, calling back to Death Race.

=== Television ===
The 2017 TV show Blood Drive also draws from the Death Race series. Instead of killing people to earn points, people are sacrificed to the cars' engines, which have been modified to run off human blood.
