= Death Race 2 =

2010 action film directed by Roel Reiné

- Home media release cover
- Directed by: Roel Reiné
- Screenplay by: Tony Giglio
- Story by: Paul W. S. Anderson; Tony Giglio
- Based on: Characters by Paul W. S. Anderson
- Produced by: Paul W. S. Anderson; Jeremy Bolt; Mike Elliott
- Starring: Luke Goss; Fred Koehler; Tanit Phoenix; Robin Shou; Lauren Cohan; Danny Trejo; Ving Rhames; Sean Bean
- Cinematography: John McKay
- Edited by: Radu Ion; Herman P. Koerts
- Music by: Paul Haslinger
- Production companies: Universal Pictures Productions GmbH; Moonlighting Death Race Films C.C.; Impact Pictures; Capital Arts Entertainment
- Distributed by: Universal Studios Home Entertainment
- Release dates: December 27, 2010 (United Kingdom); January 18, 2011 (US and Canada)
- Running time: 100 minutes
- Countries: South Africa; Germany
- Language: English
- Budget: $6–7 million (Note: While director Roel Reiné quoted the budget at less than 10 percent of its predecessor, various contemporary sources such as The Numbers and The Hollywood Reporter have reported conflicting estimates: $6 million or less and $7 million, respectively.)

Death Race 2 is a 2010 action film directed by Roel Reiné and written by Tony Giglio, who co-developed its story with Paul W. S. Anderson. It is a prequel to Death Race (2008), which is the prequel to Death Race 2000 (1975), and stars Luke Goss, Fred Koehler, Tanit Phoenix, Robin Shou, Lauren Cohan, Danny Trejo, Ving Rhames, and Sean Bean. Koehler and Shou reprise their supporting roles from Death Race, whereas Goss plays Carl "Luke" Lucas, a convicted cop killer who is sentenced to life in a for-profit, maximum-security prison on Terminal Island, where he is forced to compete in the titular reality show to earn his freedom.

Death Race 2 tells the origin story of the franchise's protagonist Frankenstein without the directorial involvement of Anderson, who was retained as producer, or the appearance of Jason Statham. Reiné signed on to direct, and filming began in Cape Town, South Africa, on February 13, 2010. He directed the 30-day shoot without a second unit, served as his own cinematographer (albeit uncredited), and opted for locations where he could have a few sets going at once to manage the schedule and the $6–7 million budget. Paul Haslinger returned as score composer.

Universal Pictures released the film direct-to-video through its home entertainment division on January 18, 2011, with a United Kingdom release date of December 27, 2010. It earned $8.4 million in US home video sales. Reviews were mixed, comparing Death Race 2 with Anderson's version and with the typical direct-to-video releases. Reiné also directed a direct-to-video sequel, Death Race 3: Inferno (2013).

== Plot ==
A gang robs a bank on behalf of crime boss Markus Kane. When two police officers unexpectedly enter the building, getaway driver Carl "Luke" Lucas urges his accomplices to abort the robbery, but they refuse. Luke intervenes, resulting in the death of one of the robbers. He then kills a police officer and abandons the remaining accomplices to complete Markus's plan. After a high-speed chase, Luke is captured, sentenced to life in prison, and eventually transferred to Terminal Island. Markus, convinced Luke will trade information for immunity despite Luke's vow of silence, orders his assassination.

Terminal Island is a for-profit, maximum-security prison operated by business magnate R. H. Weyland of Weyland Corporation. One of Weyland's primary revenue streams is "Death Match", a televised, pay-per-view gladiatorial combat event in which inmates fight using weapons or improvised defensive gear. September Jones, a disgraced former Miss Universe now employed by Weyland, hosts the spectacle.

Upon arrival, Luke befriends fellow inmates "Lists", Goldberg, and Rocco. He draws September's attention after defending Lists from an attempted assault. September makes sexual advances toward Luke and pressures him to participate in a Death Match in exchange for privileges, but he refuses. In retaliation, she selects Lists to fight "Big Bill", the massive prisoner who attacked Luke earlier. Luke jumps into the arena to protect Lists, briefly aided by convict ring girl Katrina Banks. Racial tensions escalate, sparking a riot as prisoners flood the arena and attempt to rape the female inmates. Katrina fights back, and the women are evacuated. Guards regain control, Luke surrenders, and afterward, he speaks privately with Katrina. Learning Luke is still alive, Markus places a $1 million bounty on his head.

Seeking greater profits, September launches a new event called "Death Race". Inmates can earn their freedom by winning five races over three days, driving heavily armed, reinforced cars. Female prisoners serve as navigators. Luke enters the race with Katrina as his navigator and Lists, Goldberg, and Rocco as his pit crew. Luke wins the first race and is congratulated by Weyland, who offers Katrina as his prize. Alone together, Luke and Katrina tease each other and have sex. Later, September places Luke in solitary confinement under the guise of protecting him from bounty hunters. Katrina is taken to Markus, who offers her freedom in exchange for killing Luke.

During the second race, nearly all competitors target Luke, except for triad member "14K", whom Luke previously saved. Katrina tells Luke about Markus's offer. Near the end of the race, Luke's car malfunctions due to sabotage. He ejects Katrina before the vehicle is struck by Big Bill's heat-seeking missile. Luke's pit crew and Katrina are unable to rescue him from the burning wreck. Meanwhile, Big Bill's navigator kills her partner after he murders his pit crew and attacks her. Unknown to everyone except September, Luke survives but is badly burned. September forces him to continue racing under a masked persona known as "Frankenstein".

As the final race begins, a triad assassin kills Markus at his mansion as 14K's repayment to Luke. Lists fatally stabs Rocco for sabotaging Luke's car. Luke confronts September and runs her over, killing her. Fascinated by his new identity, Katrina asks Luke whether he has a real name. He replies that he does, and she smiles as they return to the race together.

== Cast ==
- Luke Goss as Carl "Luke" Lucas / "Frankenstein": a getaway driver convicted of killing a cop in a botched bank robbery and sentenced to life in Terminal Island
- Fred Koehler as "Lists": Luke's autistic pit crew member; he previously played the role in Death Race
- Tanit Phoenix as Katrina Banks: Luke's track and romantic partner
- Robin Shou as "14K": the leader of the triad prison gang; he previously played the role in Death Race
- Lauren Cohan as September Jones: a television producer, who is the creator and host of "Death Race" and its predecessor "Death Match"
- Danny Trejo as Goldberg: a Mexican-Jewish convict and prison mechanic, who is a member of Luke's pit crew
- Ving Rhames as R. H. Weyland: the founder of Weyland Corporation and owner of Terminal Island
- Sean Bean as Markus Kane: Luke's crime boss

Additional members of the cast include Patrick Lyster as Warden Parks, DeObia Oparei as "Big Bill", Hennie Bosman as Xander Grady, Joe Vaz as Rocco, Danny Keogh as Dr. Klein, Warrick Grier as Calin, and Tanya van Graan as Holly.

== Production ==
=== Development and pre-production ===
Death Race 2 is a prequel to writer-director Paul W. S. Anderson's Death Race (2008), which itself is a prequel to Death Race 2000 (1975). Development began in August 2009 under the working title Death Race: Frankenstein Lives; Tony Giglio, Anderson's second-unit director on Resident Evil: Afterlife (2010), wrote the script for what he described as "an origin film, in every sense". He conceived of the protagonist, Carl "Luke" Lucas, as a stark contrast to the Jason Statham character that headlined the previous film, saying, "He wasn't framed. He's not fighting to get out to save his children. He's a convicted cop killer. A guy who's worked for the [American] mob his whole life. A true anti-hero." Universal Pictures greenlit Giglio's script in November 2009. Neither Anderson nor Statham returned due to other commitments, though Anderson remained as producer with Jeremy Bolt and Mike Elliott. Dutch director Roel Reiné signed on to direct in December 2009, when he had just completed production of The Marine 2. The crew also included production designer Johnny Breedt, editors Radu Ion and Herman P. Koerts, and composer Paul Haslinger (who scored the previous film).

Reiné called the script for Death Race 2 "a really cool prequel to the Death Race world". He added a fight scene and a high-speed police chase to the bank heist sequence to establish Luke as a skilled fighter and high-performance driver prior to "Death Race", in contrast to the previous film, and to provide "a spectacular chase to start with". He also incorporated different beats to the racing scenes, which he felt were derivative of those from the previous film. Likewise, Reiné pushed the producers to add slow, tender moments to the script to pause for character development and dramatic tension, and to temper the rapid pacing. Giglio's script, for example, originally had Luke being brought to fight in a "Death Match" as soon as he arrives in prison, whereas Reiné created a moment to sympathize with Luke as he sits in his cell contemplating his fate as a prisoner for life.

To facilitate his visual style, Reiné lobbied Universal to serve as his own cinematographer and camera operator—particularly on the "A" camera—in lieu of working with a cinematographer typically commissioned by a studio. When Universal agreed, he enlisted the help of a "really, really high-end" South African gaffer, John McKay, to "basically light the movie" as he shot everything. Even so, it was McKay who received sole credit as "director of photography". Because Universal wanted the film shot in high definition, Reiné opted for the Sony CineAlta F35 and the Phantom digital movie cameras. Upon performing a test shoot with the cameras, he found both produced desirable image quality, had better shutter speeds, and could handle quick hand-held movements.

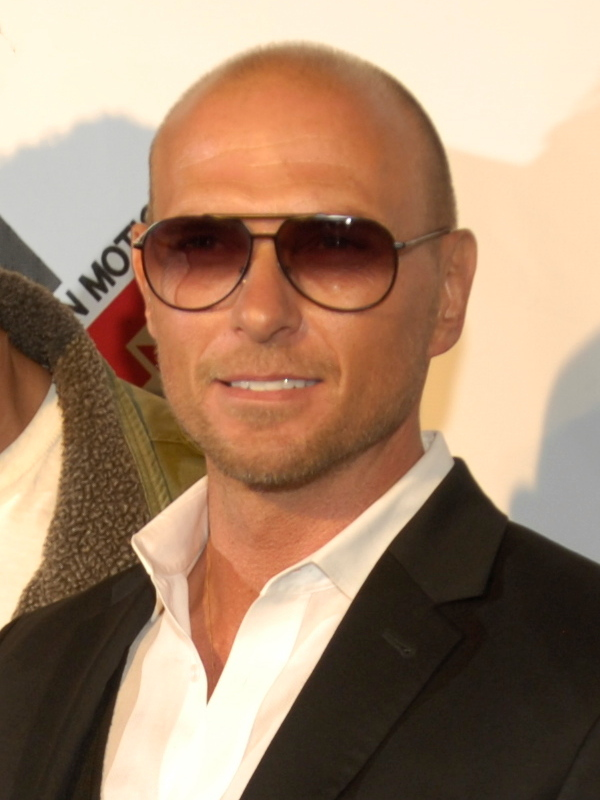
Goss (2011)

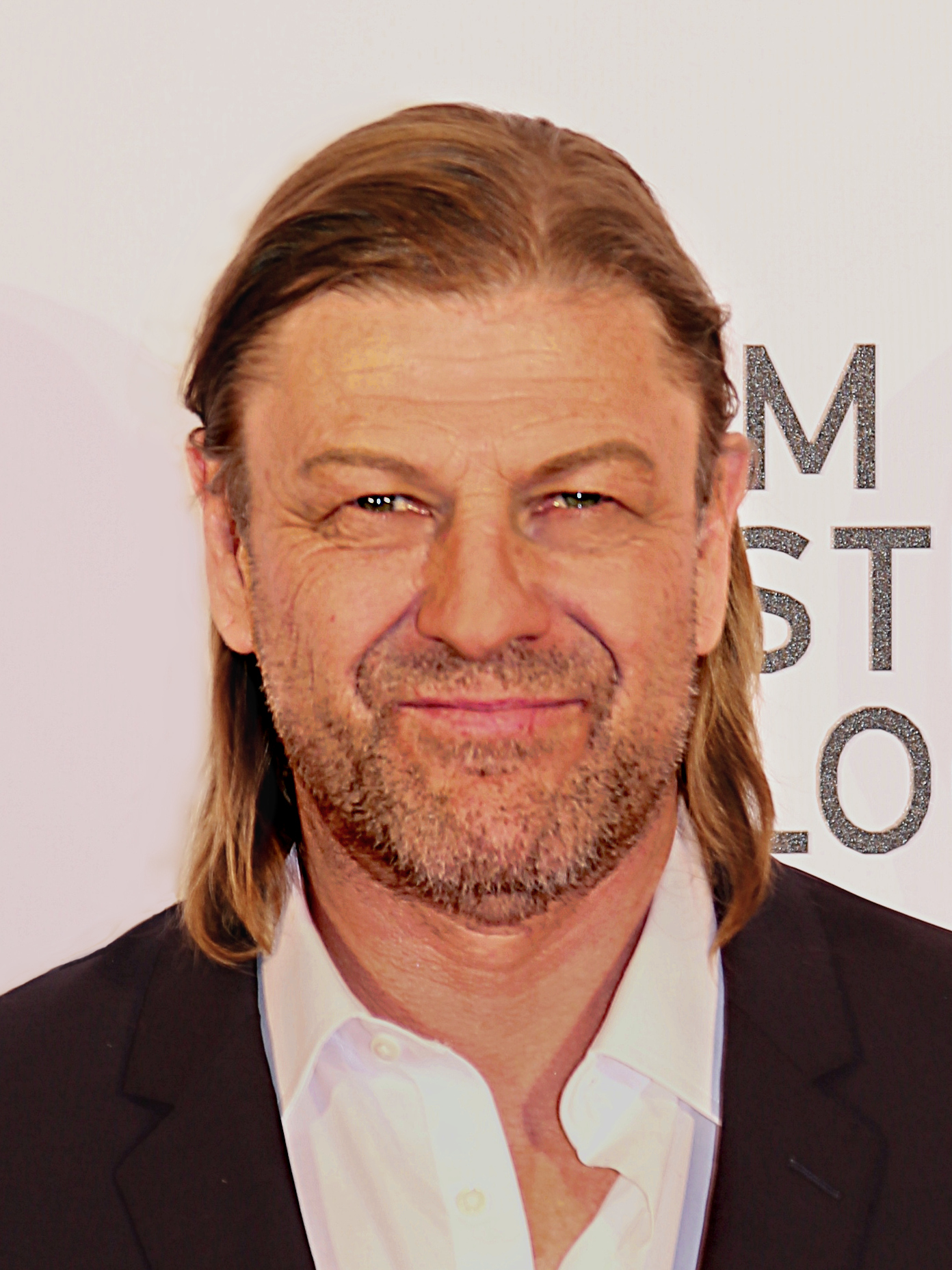
Bean (2017)

Before landing their respective roles on Death Race 2, Luke Goss and Sean Bean had been director Roel Reiné's top casting choices.

Casting began in November 2009. On March 1, 2010, The Hollywood Reporter's Heat Vision blog reported that Luke Goss, Sean Bean, Lauren Cohan, Ving Rhames, Danny Trejo, and Frederick Koehler had joined the cast. Reiné said he was "so lucky" to get both Goss and Bean on board, as they had been his top choices to play Luke and his boss prior to production. To persuade Bean to join the cast of a direct-to-video film like Death Race 2, Reiné had to ask Anderson to do it on his behalf; Bean had collaborated with Anderson on his feature directorial debut, Shopping (1994). Goss told Den of Geek he accepted the lead role because he was sold on the script, which he thought had a plot-driven story beyond the "fun" action set pieces. Rhames accepted Reiné's offer to play the owner of Weyland Corporation from over the phone and gave ideas about the character. Reiné approached Trejo about playing an inmate despite what he perceived as Trejo's hectic schedule working on big-budget films every year. Koehler and Robin Shou, according to Reiné, were both delighted to reprise their roles from the previous film; each was given more screen time than in the original.

Reiné said the production managed to locate almost all of the cars from the original film in the United States. They bought them back from collectors who had purchased them. Although they had to rebuild two missing ones—a Dodge Ram and a Chrysler—"from scratch". (Note: The other rebuilt car Reiné refers to in the audio commentary as "Big Bill's car" was a Dodge Ram Van.)

=== Filming ===
Wire work enabled Reiné (pictured top) to create "handheld crane shot[s]" for a major "Death Match" sequence.

With a $6–7 million budget, principal photography began on February 13, 2010, on location in Cape Town, South Africa. The film was a co-production between Germany and South Africa, and received tax breaks for filming in South Africa. Reiné directed the 30-day shoot without a second unit so that he could shoot independently. To manage the tight budget and schedule, Reiné opted for locations where he could "at least have four or five sets going at the same time"; on each day he would split his time between interior and exterior sets, shooting scenes that were spread across different locations. The film was shot with two each of the Sony CineAlta F35 and Phantom digital cameras. Because of the weight of the F35, Reiné relied upon the Phantom when he would shoot handheld in addition to slow motion shots. Besides slow motion, Reiné incorporated 360-degree tracking shots as well as "handheld crane shot[s]" which he accomplished with wire work for a major "Death Match" sequence.

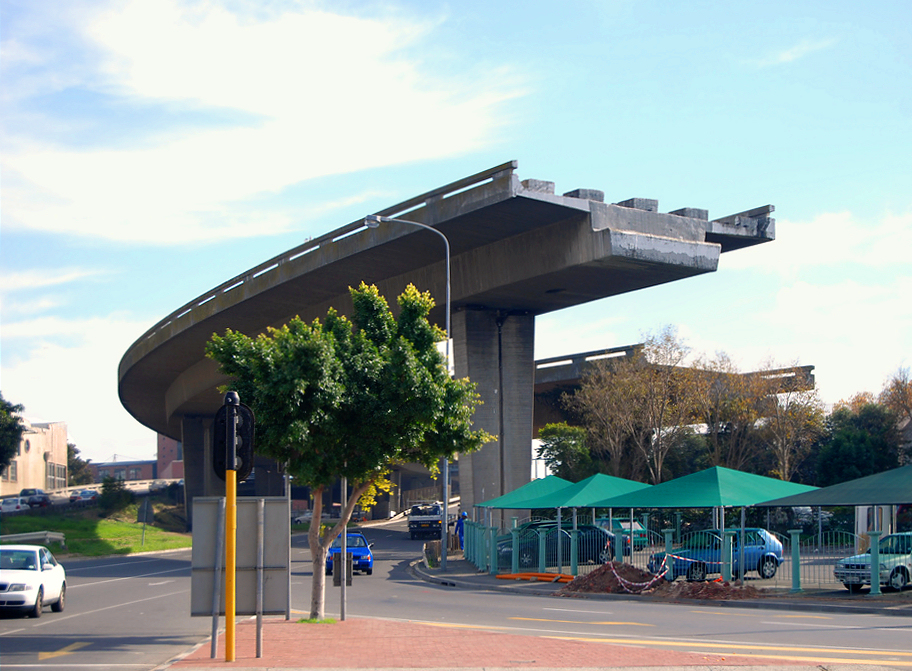
Cape Town's historic Unfinished Bridge (pictured in 2007) was used for the police chase sequence.

Prison scenes were shot in an abandoned cement factory near townships outside Cape Town. A defunct hospital was used as the prison clinic despite Reiné's complaints about its "disgusting" smell of dried human blood emanating from dirty towels "from 10, 20 years ago" in one of the rooms. He converted the hospital's kitchen into a "white room" using plenty of dry ice as well as LED lights that he and McKay had built into the camera lens and the walls to lend a heightened stylistic effect to Luke's transformation into Frankenstein. Racing scenes were shot in the cement factory, among two or three other locations. (Note: Reiné told Dread Central that one of the locations for the racing scenes was the same one he shot the "Death Match" and prison yard sequences in; in the audio commentary, Reiné states the "Death Match" and the prison yard scenes were shot in the cement factory.) Reiné said the police chase on the freeway, which ends at Cape Town's historic Unfinished Bridge, could not be shot until Sunday, between six and nine o'clock in the morning. Unable to find "a really big, glass, industrial, high-end office space" that would serve as the interior of the Weyland Corporation, Reiné settled for the Cape Town International Convention Centre.

According to Goss, he and Reiné decided to film some shots of his driving sequences as he drove the cars, citing Bullitt (1968) as an influence. When shooting Goss' test drive sequence, Reiné struggled with the dilapidated Ford Mustang, saying it would either break down or not start at all, in which case he "had to push it for the next day". Reiné said the other cars used in the racing sequences had to undergo repairs overnight, as they would often break down during the day. He incorporated 20 percent of the unused second-unit footage from the original film because, unlike Anderson, he had only one week to shoot racing scenes, during which he was also shooting crash sequences and wrecking and blowing up the cars.

=== Stunts ===
Reiné made limited use of computer-generated imagery (CGI) to film driving stunts, influenced by his affinity for 1980s action films. Likewise, he eschewed stunt doubles in favor of having the actors stage their own fighting. Stunt coordinator Adam Horton described the fight choreography as "more street style, it's more rough, it's more cage fighting, UFC, like Pride".

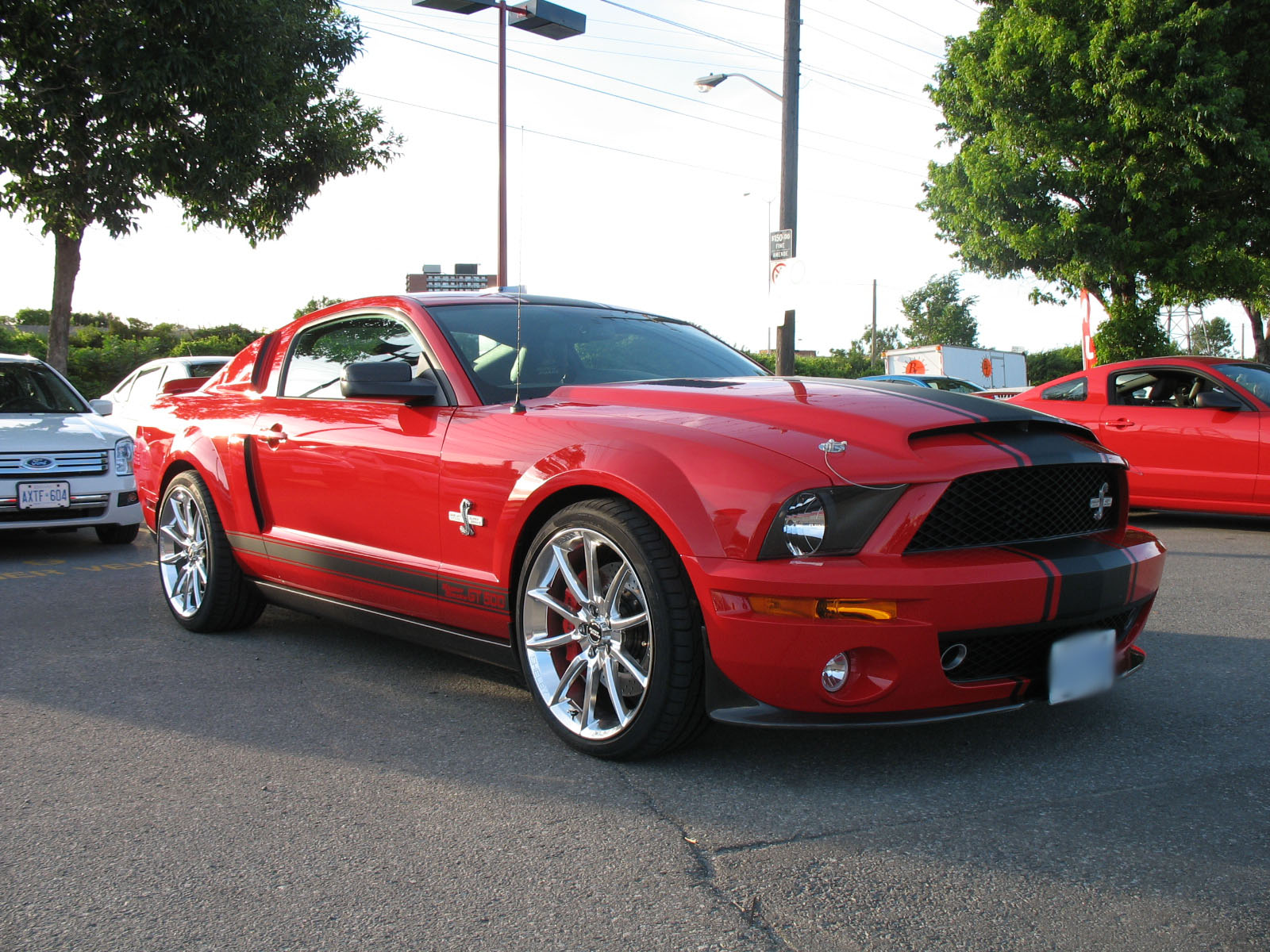
The production was loaned a Shelby Mustang GT500 Super Snake for the police chase sequence.

For the police chase sequence, the production was loaned a Shelby Mustang GT500 Super Snake that they had to maintain in mint condition throughout filming. Thus, Reiné designed the sequence with Luke not hitting anything on his path, unlike the police. Goss told Motor Trend that he asked Reiné and the producers for permission to let him do most of his driving with the Shelby, proving he could do so by performing "a J turn and some 360s". In addition to giving Goss basic lessons on driving the Shelby, the stunt drivers disabled its traction control and anti-lock braking systems to facilitate his stunts. On shooting the sequence, Goss stated:

As I brake, I know there's a stunt driver behind me that has to brake. He doesn't know exactly when I'm going to do it because I'm trying to find a line. The stunt driver is driving a police car, so he's chasing me in the story. He needs to get super close but I can't help thinking if I brake too dramatically—bang! I don't want to hit anyone, and not all of our drivers that day were stunt drivers. Some of them were told "keep your line, don't deviate" so that when I'm trying to find a line through, it wasn't choreographed. It was a little intimidating but a lot of fun.

An AOL Moviefone journalist who served as an extra wrote that Robin Shou was nearly killed on set when a rapidly descending metal gangway narrowly missed his head. The extra, Jason Newman, said a miscommunication between Shou and the stunt coordinators on his prison-fight sequence with Hennie Bosman led to the incident. Of this near-death experience, Shou stated he "has never been so shaken". According to Reiné, Shou told him that it was grueling to shoot the sequence because he and Bosman had to repeat their stunts several times to accommodate Reiné's desire for a copious amount of camera coverage.

=== Post-production ===
Editing lasted 9–10 weeks; Anderson and producers Jeremy Bolt and Paula Wagner oversaw the process. The editors' cut was two hours and thirty minutes; Reiné's cut was two hours. The opening sequence set in the prison yard—which originally ran 8–10 minutes—was edited to two minutes, yielding a final cut that runs one hour and forty minutes. Reiné credits the condensed opening sequence to editing notes Anderson relayed during post-production. One of the cuts that was kept from editors Radu Ion and Herman P. Koerts's assembly footage was the seduction scene in the prison showers featuring Luke Goss and Lauren Cohan, which Reiné said was "really put together" and worked well together with Goss' and Cohan's performances.

Reiné said that the 700 visual effects shots included green-screen compositing and wire removal. Technical restrictions with the chase camera rigs prompted him to adopt Anderson's method of using CG muzzle flashes instead of squibs for the racing sequences, explaining, "Because everything goes so fast, ... there's no room for the camera to really register the bullets going out".

== Release ==
Universal Pictures released Death Race 2 direct-to-video through its home entertainment division in the UK on December 27, 2010, and worldwide on January 18, 2011. Both the DVD and Blu-ray provide an option to watch the R-rated or unrated version, as well as bonus material including featurettes on the cars, stunts, and canonicity of the film; deleted scenes; and a feature-length commentary with the director Roel Reiné. Universal released a double-feature collection containing Death Race 2 and Death Race on October 9, 2012, and all four films in the Death Race franchise in a collection on October 2, 2018.

In the United States, the film generated a total of $8.4 million in home video sales: $7.2 million from DVD and $1.2 million from Blu-ray. Two hundred eighteen thousand ($4.04 million) DVD copies were sold in its opening week, making it a decent debut for a direct-to-video title despite being overtaken by big-budget titles on the DVD sales chart. (Note: Death Race 2 placed fourth on the DVD sales chart in its opening week, behind Takers, The Social Network, and Despicable Me.) In the same week, 50,000 Blu-ray copies were sold.

== Reception ==
Reviewers compared Death Race 2 with Paul W. S. Anderson's Death Race and with the typical direct-to-video releases. Den of Geek, Now, and Dread Central ranked it above Anderson's theatrical release, and Fearnet and Salon.com described it as surpassing the usual standards for a direct-to-video follow-up. For the Heavy reviewer, the release suggested a greater emphasis on quality in Universal's direct-to-video output. Reviews by Fearnet and Dread Central also characterized the film as competently made but lacking lasting impact, with the latter considering it to be "easily watchable, ... and yet just as forgettable".

Responses to the action sequences varied, particularly over how effectively the film used its central premise. In the opinion of the Screen Daily reviewer, the set pieces were competently staged by director Roel Reiné. Salon.com said that, due to strong engagement with the material, he managed to deliver "solid" action scenes akin to those in his earlier sequel, The Marine 2 (2009). Several reviewers identified the "Death Match" sequences as highlights, judging them more effective than the racing itself. By contrast, the racing sequences—central to the franchise's concept—prompted more criticism. The A.V. Club and DVD Verdict found them less dynamic than those in Anderson's film, arguing that the premise was underused and the pacing suffered as a result. Although Arrow in the Head considered the central race comparable in intensity to the earlier film, DVD Verdict disagreed and ultimately found Death Race 2 bereft of thrill and momentum.

Reaction to the technical presentation was mixed. Cinematical and Screen Daily said the production values exceeded what is typical for a direct-to-video release, and DVD Talk singled out the stunts, cinematography, and execution for praise. Reiné, according to IGN, gave the film a polished presentation that belied its apparent budget. Other reviews focused on shortcomings, with Den of Geek pointing to unfinished visual effects as being supplementary to the film's "B-movie charm". ComingSoon.net described the production as substandard and argued that stylistic emphasis displaced narrative development, while Exclaim! praised the production design but criticized the frequent use of slow motion and the electronic score.

Reviews were divided on the cast's performances. Luke Goss's lead performance drew frequent comparison to Jason Statham's in the earlier film. Den of Geek, Heavy, and Screen Daily viewed him as a suitable successor, and Total Film said his performance helped carry the film through weaker narrative sections. Goss, according to DVD Talk, brought limited characterization within the constraints of a "thankless role". Supporting performances by Danny Trejo, Ving Rhames, and Sean Bean were often cited as enhancing the film's appeal. Criticisms, however, were common: The Record characterized the acting as broad, while Exclaim! felt that Trejo and Rhames appeared disengaged, though even more critical reviews such as Total Film singled out Bean as a point of contrast. Lauren Cohan was also unfavorably compared with the earlier film's Joan Allen, with her acting described by DVD Talk as "setting back the feminist movement with an agonizing, cleavage-popping performance of ultimate whoredom".

Overall assessments of the film also varied; some reviewers rated it more favorably than its predecessor, while others dismissed it as a weak or unnecessary addition to the series. "If you weren't a fan of Death Race," said The Numbers, "this won't win you over." Despite finding flaws to the plot, characterization, and originality, other reviewers insisted that Death Race 2 functioned effectively as a straightforward action feature. (Note: Attributed to multiple references:) In a mixed review, the Daily Mirror critic wrote that it was hardly a "classic action fare, but delivers [sic] enough fun for undemanding blokes returning from the pub, preferably in a state of advanced inebriation".

The reception to Death Race 2 has remained mixed in the years since its release. A 2024 retrospective essay from SlashFilm on the Death Race franchise wrote, "Between the relentless bloodbath and the thrilling lack of logical consequences, Death Race 2 never fails to astonish and entertain." Bloody Disgusting, in a 2022 retrospective review of Death Race, called the follow-up (and its successors) "surprisingly fun". Conversely, Collider thought Death Race 2 was "okay", while The A.V. Club deemed it "by far the shittiest" installment, comparing it to 2 Fast 2 Furious (2003).

== Sequel ==
Universal filmed a sequel, Death Race 3: Inferno, in Cape Town, South Africa, in late 2011. Reiné and screenwriter Tony Giglio returned for the sequel, as did Luke Goss, Danny Trejo, Ving Rhames, Fred Koehler, Robin Shou, and Tanit Phoenix, alongside series newcomers Dougray Scott and Hlubi Mboya. Universal 1440 Entertainment released Death Race 3: Inferno direct-to-video on January 22, 2013.
