= Frankenstein (Death Race) =

Fictional character in the Death Race films

- Frankenstein as he appears in Death Race 2000 (left) and Death Race 1–3 (right)
- First appearance: Death Race 2000 (1975)
- Last appearance: Death Race: Beyond Anarchy (2018)

In-universe information
- Aliases: Jensen Ames (Death Race); Carl "Luke" Lucas (Death Race 2 and Death Race 3: Inferno); Niles York (Death Race 3: Inferno)
- Gender: Male
- Occupation: Driver; Convict
- Nationality: American (Carl Lucas, Frankenstein); British (Niles York, Jensen Ames)

Frankenstein is a fictional character and the main protagonist of the Death Race franchise. Within the film universe, the character is an alias taken on by other characters who participate in the titular race. The character has been played by David Carradine, Jason Statham, Luke Goss, Dougray Scott, Manu Bennett, and Velislav Pavlov.

== Character biography ==
=== Death Race 2000 (1975) ===
In the original 1975 film, Frankenstein is portrayed as the reigning champion of the Transcontinental Road Race, an annual gladiator-style cross-country race. A symbol of the ruling totalitarian government, he is a feared racer who is purported to be half-man, half-machine.

In reality, it turns out that there have been several Frankensteins over the years – each one recruited by the government to replace their injured or killed predecessors. In this way, with each man donning the same alias and disguise, Frankenstein seems to be an unkillable opponent who survives any crash or injury. The current Frankenstein (David Carradine) is disillusioned with the government, as well as the race, and he plans to assassinate the tyrannical Mr. President (Sandy McCallum). Although his plans to win the race and destroy the government are nearly ruined by the actions of a Resistance movement, he eventually succeeds in both winning the race and killing Mr. President. He then assumes the office of President himself and puts an end to the race.

=== Death Race (2008) ===
In the 2008 remake of the 1975 film, ex-race driver Jensen Ames (Jason Statham) is imprisoned on Terminal Island after he is framed for his wife's murder. Terminal Island is home to a televised gladiator-style race called the Death Race, and Ames soon finds himself forced to race by the tyrannical Warden Hennessey (Joan Allen). Ames must assume the mantle of Frankenstein, the current leading racer, whose appearance is covered by a mask. The previous Frankenstein was killed in a fiery crash, though the prison population believes he has simply spent the last six months recovering in the infirmary. The previous Frankenstein had already won four out of five races necessary to secure freedom, requiring Ames to only win one more race. Hennessey explains that Frankenstein is the most popular racer in the history of the race, and ratings would take a sharp hit if his death were announced.

Ames soon learns that Hennessey was behind his wife's murder, using Ulrich (Jason Clarke), the lead guard, and Pachenko (Max Ryan), a fellow racer. Ames decides to win the Death Race and use it as a means of revenge. With only his pit crew knowing the truth about Frankenstein, Ames goes on to uncover what happened to his predecessor, kills Pachenko during the race, and ultimately succeeds in using the race to escape, along with his chief rival, Machine-Gun Joe (Tyrese Gibson). Afterwards, Coach (Ian McShane), a member of his pit crew, detonates a bomb in Hennessey's office, killing both her and Ulrich. It is unknown if the Frankenstein mantle was resurrected by the next warden.

=== Death Race 2 (2010) ===
The first prequel to the 2008 film reveals the origins of Frankenstein. Getaway driver Carl "Luke" Lucas (Luke Goss) is captured after a bank robbery gone bad, in which he was to protect the nephew of crime boss Markus Kane (Sean Bean). Although loyal and refusing to cooperate with the authorities, Lucas is marked for death by Kane because he knows too much. He is sent to Terminal Island and recruited to compete in the Death Match, a brutal gladiator-style show, ostensibly run by the aging warden but, in reality, controlled by producer September Jones (Lauren Cohan). His fight results in a large-scale prison riot and ultimately spells the end of the controversial show.

The Death Match is replaced by the Death Race, a gladiatorial race that uses custom cars and unused space along the island's outer edges. The prize for winning five races is freedom. Lucas initially does well, but is targeted by the other drivers due to the bounty on his head. When he saves the life of fellow driver 14K (Robin Shou), 14K pays back this favor by killing Kane. Ultimately, Lucas is driven off the track and ends up in a seemingly fatal crash. However, he returns under a new identity created by Jones, Frankenstein, a horribly scarred racer who wears a mask. However, at the start of his next race, he rams and kills Jones, to the pleasure of her many enemies.

=== Death Race 3: Inferno (2013) ===
In the second prequel, a direct bridge to the 2010 film, Lucas' (Luke Goss) appearance is restored with reconstructive surgery, but he still does not reveal his identity to his pit crew. However, they discover that Lucas is Frankenstein after his mask is knocked off during a brawl at Kalahari Prison in South Africa, where Lucas and his crew are sent to compete in the first International Death Race. The new race is the brainchild of British billionaire Niles York (Dougray Scott). Because Lucas has won four of the five races required for his freedom, York demands that he throw the final race or face death.

At the end of the race, Lucas crashes his car into the operations center, where York has been handcuffed to a table by his producer, incensed by York firing and replacing her. York is horribly burned in the fiery crash, and the world at large is then led to believe that York is the survived Frankenstein, despite his protestations. Lucas and his crew stage their deaths and escape, while the disfigured York, resigned to the fact that everyone believes that he is Frankenstein, adopts the mantle. The film ends with York, now using an American accent (strongly implying that it is he who is the Frankenstein killed at the start of the 2008 film), stating in voiceover, "I am Frankenstein. And I will have my revenge."

=== Death Race: Beyond Anarchy (2018) ===
In the first sequel of the remake series, a new Frankenstein (played by Bulgarian actor Velislav Pavlov and voiced by Nolan North) has become the ruler of a prison colony called the Sprawl and has won seven races, despite the race now being illegal. Weyland International had tried to have Frankenstein killed several times, all without success.

Frankenstein takes an interest in newly-arrived prisoner Connor (Zach McGowan) when the man not only beats up several of Frankenstein's henchmen, but also shows no fear or respect towards him when he confronts him personally. After observing Connor win a qualifying match in the Death Pit by gruesomely defeating his henchman the Butcher, Frankenstein has Connor brought to him and tells him that if he wins the Death Race, he will become king of the Sprawl, and asks if he is ready for that responsibility.

The next day, Frankenstein discovers that Connor is actually Sergeant Connor Gibson, a soldier sent by Weyland International with the purpose of killing him. He outs Connor in front of the prison populace and declares that Connor will be allowed to take part in the Death Race, earning Connor much hate from the populace.

At the starting line of the Death Race, Frankenstein reveals to Connor that he has made Jane (Christine Marzano), the prison bartender who has become Connor's love interest, his new co-pilot as an "insurance policy" against Connor. Throughout the Death Race, competitors are taken out one by one until at the final stretch, when Connor finally catches up to Frankenstein, Connor runs out of gas. Despite pleading from Jane, Frankenstein chooses to run Connor down with his car when he is suddenly T-boned by the other remaining runner-up, Gypsy Rose (Yennis Cheung), who shoots him dead, revealing herself to also be a soldier sent by Weyland International.

In the aftermath, Connor is convinced by Sprawl resident Baltimore Bob (Danny Glover) to take up the mantle and become the new Frankenstein, which he does.

== Appearances ==
=== Original series ===
- Death Race 2000 (1975), directed by Paul Bartel
- Death Race 2050 (2017), directed by G. J. Echternkamp

=== Remake series ===
- Death Race (2008), directed by Paul W. S. Anderson
- Death Race 2 (2010), directed by Roel Reiné
- Death Race 3: Inferno (2013), directed by Roel Reiné
- Death Race: Beyond Anarchy (2018), directed by Don Michael Paul
