= Death Race 3: Inferno =

2013 American action film directed by Roel Reiné

- DVD cover
- Directed by: Roel Reiné
- Screenplay by: Tony Giglio
- Story by: Paul W. S. Anderson; Tony Giglio
- Based on: Characters by Paul W. S. Anderson
- Produced by: Paul W. S. Anderson; Jeremy Bolt; Mike Elliott
- Starring: Luke Goss; Danny Trejo; Tanit Phoenix; Fred Koehler; Robin Shou; Ving Rhames; Dougray Scott
- Cinematography: Wayne Shields
- Edited by: Michael Trent; Radu Ion
- Music by: Trevor Morris
- Production companies: Universal 1440 Entertainment; Impact Pictures; Chestnut Ridge Productions
- Distributed by: Universal Pictures Home Entertainment
- Release date: January 22, 2013
- Running time: 105 minutes
- Country: United States
- Language: English

Death Race 3: Inferno (also known as Death Race 3 and Death Race: Inferno) is a 2013 American science fiction action film directed by Roel Reiné. It is the third installment in the Death Race film series and takes place between the events of Death Race 2 (2010) and Death Race (2008). Produced by Paul W.S. Anderson, the film stars Luke Goss, Tanit Phoenix, Danny Trejo, and Ving Rhames. The movie combines dystopian elements with intense vehicular combat in a race to the death. The film was released direct-to-video on January 22, 2013, and was followed by Death Race: Beyond Anarchy in 2018.

== Plot ==
Death Race owner R. H. Weyland has been forced to sell the rights to Niles York, a British billionaire who acquired the rights by a hostile takeover and intends to relocate the Death Race to South Africa. Before leaving, Weyland arranges Carl Lucas, also known as Frankenstein, to have his face fixed after it was previously disfigured. With Lucas just one win away from his freedom, York fears losing the huge Frankenstein fanbase and threatens to kill Lucas if he wins.

As the crew from Terminal Island reaches the facility in South Africa, a scuffle breaks out, forcing Lucas (in his Frankenstein persona) to intervene. However, his mask is knocked off during the fight, revealing to his team of Katrina Banks, Goldberg, and Lists that he has been hiding his identity behind the mask during their previous races.

Before the first race, the pool of female navigators are pitted against each other to participate in the "Navigator Wars", a gladiator-style armed fight to the death. The show is now hosted and produced by Satana, on behalf of York. Ten surviving navigators, including Katrina, are assigned to their drivers. Afterwards, all race participants are shot on their necks with GPS trackers, so the showrunners can track them and kill them if they attempt to escape.

The first race, in the Kalahari Desert, features terrain that calls for a different racing strategy from the one on the Terminal Island prison course. Lucas manages to regain Goldberg's trust, but not Katrina's. Eleven racers compete, but Jackal makes a jump start, only to be blown up by a tracking missile. Three racers and their navigators die during the race, while Razor beats Frankenstein to win the first day.

Katrina, still heartbroken that Lucas has kept secrets from her all along, distances herself from him. After getting a flesh wound from another brawl, Goldberg establishes a relationship with the show's surgeon, Olivia. In order to make Katrina jealous, Satana orders Psycho's navigator Amber to have sex with Lucas.

Satana and York grow suspicious of Lucas, due to his non-rebellious attitude to being forced to lose. Meanwhile, Lucas meets with his crew, including Katrina, apologizing and explaining what they were up against. Having finally regained their trust, Lucas explains that he has made a "new deal".

The second race commences with the death of three more teams. Fury is killed after being tricked by Olga Braun (Death Race's first-ever female driver), who is in turn run over by Razor. Razor struggles to handle both Lucas and Psycho before they are joined by 14K, who disabled Nero's truck before leaving him to get beaten to death by an angry mob of locals. Lucas wins the second race, but Goldberg is caught in an explosion caused by stray bullets from local war lords, and Olivia pronounces him dead.

York reminds Lucas to lose his next race, or he will have Katrina tortured. Satana discovers York wishes to replace her as producer and remove her from the Death Race so he can assume control. Meanwhile, Lucas reveals to Katrina he did not sleep with Amber and professes his love to her. Before the final race, Psycho and Lucas have a chat about the identity of Frankenstein, and whether Lucas was the first or even the last.

York is determined to keep Lucas from winning at any cost. Razor disables Psycho's car, killing him. Lucas takes the lead, and York orders him killed with a tracking missile. However, 14K shoots flares to divert the missile and destroy it, saving Lucas's life and repaying his debt from the race back in Terminal Island. York fires Prudence, his secretary, who was against his actions all along.

Lucas, who holds a commanding lead, relinquishes it to 14K and turns off to find York. Satana handcuffs York to a table for his betrayal. After Katrina finally professes her love to Lucas, they both crash their own car into the control room and it explodes, engulfing the room in flames. It appears that everyone, except a facially disfigured Lucas, perished in the crash. However, at the medical facility, Lucas yells that he is York, not Frankenstein. Olivia, Lists and the GPS tracking chip confirm it to be Lucas/Frankenstein, and they report the same to Prudence, who fills in for the "late" York. She returns the Death Race to Terminal Island and assigns Hennessy to take charge of the race, while recruiting "Coach" to replace Goldberg.

It is then revealed that Lucas made a deal with Weyland while at the hospital; Weyland provided Olivia as an insider, and she helped fake Goldberg's death. Satana yielded to Weyland, trapping York in the control room right before the planned car crash; Lucas and Katrina ejected from the car before the crash, and Olivia planted the tracker with Frankenstein's I.D into York's body, leaving York and Katrina to be pronounced dead. Weyland regains control of the Death Race and grants the team their freedom, though Lists refuses and returns to Terminal Island. Weyland pays Lucas and his team a lot of money for their help, which they use to relocate to a nearby beach resort. Meanwhile, York is now forced to assume the identity of Frankenstein, hoping to gain his freedom and have his revenge while racing at Terminal Island in the future.

== Cast ==
- Luke Goss as Carl "Luke" Lucas / "Frankenstein"
- Tanit Phoenix as Katrina Banks
- Danny Trejo as Goldberg
- Fred Koehler as "Lists"
- Ving Rhames as R. H. Weyland
- Dougray Scott as Niles York / "Frankenstein", he was killed by Machine Gun Joe in Death Race (2008).
- Robin Shou as "14K"
- Hlubi Mboya as Satana
- Kim Syster as Olivia
- Roxane Hayward as Prudence
- Eugene Wanangwa Khumbanyiwa as Nero
- Chase Armitage as "Apache" (archive footage)
- Lauren Cohan as September Jones (archive footage)
- Dick Ervasti as Commercial
- Olivia Jackson as Palmer
- Anton David Jeftha as "Jackal"
- Louis Joubert as Psycho Pit Crew #1
- Brandon Livanos as "Pretty Boy"
- Dumani Mtya as Angry Skinhead
- Michael Solomon as "Sheik" (archive footage)
- Rowan Thane as Tunnel Riot Guard

== Release and reception ==
Death Race 3: Inferno was released directly to home video on January 22, 2013. The film received mixed reviews from critics, who praised the high-action sequences and stunts but criticized the limited character development and predictable storyline.

Critical response

On the review aggregator website Rotten Tomatoes, 50% of 6 critics' reviews are positive, with an average rating of 5.1/10. Scott Foy of Dread Central rated it 3/5 stars and wrote, "Movies like Death Race 3: Inferno are like a piece of chewing gum – the flavor is fleeting, you spit it out when you're done without hesitation, but it gave you the minor fix you were after." Jesse Skeen of DVD Talk rated it 3/5 stars and wrote, "This movie probably won't win any awards, but it's great mindless fun." David Johnson of DVD Verdict said it was "ultimately a loud and tedious chore." Scott Weinberg of Fearnet wrote, "Cheap, choppy, and almost shamelessly by-the-numbers, Death Race 3 earns points for the same reason its predecessor did: it's quick, slick, enjoyably empty-headed, just energetic enough to smash through the finish line".
