= Death Race: Beyond Anarchy =

- DVD cover
- Directed by: Don Michael Paul
- Screenplay by: Tony Giglio; Don Michael Paul
- Story by: Paul W. S. Anderson; Tony Giglio
- Based on: Characters by Paul W. S. Anderson
- Produced by: Mike Elliott; Greg Holstein
- Starring: Zach McGowan; Danny Glover; Christine Marzano
- Cinematography: Alexander Krumov
- Edited by: Vanick Moradian
- Music by: Frederik Wiedmann
- Production companies: Universal 1440 Entertainment; Impact Pictures; Chestnut Ridge Productions
- Distributed by: Universal Pictures Home Entertainment
- Release date: October 2, 2018
- Running time: 111 minutes
- Country: United States
- Language: English

Death Race: Beyond Anarchy is a 2018 American science fiction action film directed by Don Michael Paul. It is the fourth and final film in the Death Race remake series and a direct sequel to the 2008 film Death Race. The film was released on DVD and digitally on October 2, 2018. This was also the final film to feature a producing credit from Roger Corman (who produced the original Death Race 2000) before his death in 2024.

== Plot ==
A privatized security firm runs the Sprawl, a massive prison housing around 420,000 inmates. Inside, the popular Death Race competition has been made illegal by the new warden who was hired by the prison's owner, Weyland International. He has been tasked with taking out Frankenstein, the prison's Death Race champion and king.

After defeating a competitor in a Death Race, a prison SWAT team attempts to take Frankenstein out, killing several convicts before they are cornered and butchered by Frankenstein's loyal inmate army. Frankenstein speaks to the warden through one of their body cameras, saying that he will kill every man the warden sends to kill him.

A helicopter of new prisoners arrives at the Sprawl. They are each given a roll of silver coins to help make their way in the prison. Immediately upon landing, "the Cops," a prison gang run by Death Racer Johnny Law, come upon the new inmates and kill most of them. Two survive but refuse to hand over their coins. They defeat the entire gang, demonstrating skillful technique, and go their separate ways.

The male inmate, Connor, is picked up by a group of women who see his fight. He tells them he is looking for Baltimore Bob, a name he overheard while on the helicopter, who supposedly runs the Death Races. They take him to a bar run by Frankenstein, where Johnny Law is about to be killed for failing to get all the coins from the new inmates. Connor defeats two more of Frankenstein's henchmen and Frankenstein confronts him personally. The bartender, Jane, connects Connor with Baltimore Bob, who also witnessed his fight.

Baltimore Bob takes Connor around the prison. They attend a qualifying match for the Death Race at the Death Pit, where riders on motorcycles must avoid obstacles and traps in order to survive. The other inmate who fought the Cops upon landing, Gipsy Rose, wins the match. That night, Jane once again sees Connor and brings him to her house. She assumes he wishes to sleep with her, but Connor refuses.

The next day, Connor tells Baltimore Bob that he wants to be in a Death Race. His qualifying match is a footrace to a tower, which he must climb to claim the keys to a car. He fights his way to the tower and gets the keys; he is confronted by the Butcher, a man carrying a sledgehammer and sickle, whom Connor defeats. Frankenstein tells his concubine Carley to bring Connor to him. In the shower, Carley makes a pass at Connor, which he again refuses. Frankenstein tells him that if he wins the Death Race, he will become king of the Sprawl. After the meeting, Connor goes to see Jane again. This time, they begin a relationship.

Connor begins construction of his Death Racer with Baltimore Bob. The woman who picked him up after his fight with the Cops asks to be his co-pilot, to which he reluctantly agrees. He spends the night before the Death Race with Jane again.

The next morning, he sees the entire prison descending on Jane's house. He is then confronted by Frankenstein, who reveals to the prison that Connor is actually Sergeant Connor Gibson, a special operative sent inside to kill him. He declares that Connor will be allowed to compete in the Death Race.

As the Death Racers arrive at the starting line, Frankenstein reveals that his new co-pilot will be a captive Jane, whom he is using as an "insurance policy" against Connor. Throughout the Death Race, competitors are taken out one by one, until only Connor, Frankenstein, Johnny Law and Gipsy Rose remain. Connor, in last, gets rerouted by Baltimore Bob. He performs a near impossible jump over a downed bridge and gets back behind Frankenstein. Johnny Law is eliminated and Gipsy Rose is in third.

During the final stretch, Connor runs out of gas. Frankenstein turns around and Jane begs him not to kill Connor. Frankenstein drives at Connor and his co-pilot; but then, Gipsy Rose t-bones Frankenstein. Connor rushes to help Jane and Gipsy Rose shoots Frankenstein, killing him. She tells Connor that a helicopter will be there to pick them up soon; he realizes that she is also a special agent. Connor, now torn between his past life and his new one with Jane, decides to stay. Baltimore Bob tells him to put on the mask, become Frankenstein and run the Sprawl. He takes Frankenstein's coat and mask, wins the Death Race and presumably stays at the Sprawl.

== Cast ==
- Zach McGowan as Connor Gibson
- Danny Glover as Bob "Baltimore Bob"
- Fred Koehler as "Lists"
- Christine Marzano as Jane
- Danny Trejo as Goldberg
- Cassie Clare as Bexie
- Yennis Cheung as Rose "Gipsy Rose"
- Lucy Aarden as Carley J'adore
- Velislav Pavlov as "Frankenstein"
  - Nolan North as The Voice of Frankenstein
- Nicholas Aaron as Johnny Law
- Julian Seager as "The Fireman"
- Velizar Peev as "Nazi Boy"
- Lorina Kamburova as "Nazi Girl"
- Marian Valev as "Dead Man"
- Jasette Amos as Matilda "The Nun"
- Cameron Jack as The Warden
- Terence Maynard as Valentine
- Vanina Arias as "El Cabino"
- Dilyana Popova as "Dead Girl"
- Genislav Naydenov as "Pierced-Face"

== Production ==
It was announced in 2016 that a fourth instalment of Death Race was in development. Filming took place in Bulgaria during the winter.

== Release ==
The film was originally scheduled to be released on January 30, 2018, but was pushed back to October 2.

== Reception ==
DVD Talk stated that the film had “a bit of old and new here, which will please fans of the previous movies but likely won't win any new ones from those who didn't like them”.

AV Club referred to the Death Race films as being a “younger, dumber and cheaper version of Fast & Furious”, saying that Beyond Anarchy was the cheapest but “not the dumbest” of the lot.
