= Death Race 2050 =

2017 film by G. J. Echternkamp

- Promotional release poster
- Directed by: G. J. Echternkamp
- Screenplay by: G. J. Echternkamp; Matt Yamashita
- Based on: Death Race 2000 by Robert Thom and Charles B. Griffith "The Racer" by Ib Melchior
- Produced by: Roger Corman
- Starring: Manu Bennett; Malcolm McDowell; Marci Miller; Burt Grinstead; Folake Olowofoyeku; Anessa Ramsey; Yancy Butler
- Cinematography: Juan Durán
- Edited by: G. J. Echternkamp; Steve Ansell
- Music by: Gunter Brown; Cindy Brown
- Production companies: Universal 1440 Entertainment; New Horizons Pictures
- Distributed by: Universal Pictures
- Release date: January 17, 2017
- Running time: 93 minutes
- Country: United States
- Language: English

Death Race 2050 (stylized on-screen as Roger Corman's Death Race 2050) is a 2017 American satirical science fiction action direct-to-video film directed by G.J. Echternkamp, and starring Manu Bennett, Marci Miller and Malcolm McDowell. It is a sequel to the 1975 film Death Race 2000. Both films were produced by Roger Corman, who described the film as "a car-racing picture with some black humor."

== Plot ==
The year is 2050, during the final years of the human race. In the United Corporations of America, which is plagued by overpopulation and an unemployment rate of 99.993%, the Death Race provides both entertainment and population control. Spanning from Old New York to New Los Angeles, the current Death Race features reigning champion Frankenstein, genetically engineered athlete Jed Perfectus, hip-hop sensation Minerva Jefferson, female cultist Tammy the Terrorist and the evil, black, artificially intelligent, self-driving car ABE. Each driver is assigned a proxy, a broadcaster who allows the audience to experience the race through virtual reality. Frankenstein is immediately put off by his proxy, Annie Sullivan, and ignores both her attempts to interview him and her suggestions to let his opponents pass him.

As the drivers race through the East Coast, rebels, led by former network producer Alexis Hamilton, set traps throughout the sector. Tammy and Minerva form a fierce rivalry when they steal each other's cult followers for kills. After running into a rebel trap, ABE malfunctions, kills its proxy, and abandons the race to discover its purpose in life. At the first checkpoint, Hamilton orders Annie, who is revealed to be her spy, to kill Frankenstein. Her attempt to seduce him fails, as he only cares about winning the race. Elsewhere, the Chairman explains that Frankenstein has become a liability due to his longevity, whereas Perfectus will encourage his devoted fans to die at his hands.

On Day Two of the race, the drivers pass through the heartland of the country, known for its gun-wielding citizens. Minerva's proxy, Chi Wapp, is killed by a suicide bomber sent by Tammy. Frankenstein takes a shortcut on another tip, but his car gets stuck in a cornfield. As Annie wanders off, Frankenstein fends off a group of Resistance ninjas to score more points. Upon reaching the second checkpoint, Annie admits to being a rebel and attempts to recruit Frankenstein. Politically apathetic, Frankenstein curses both the rebels and the government, reiterating that he only wants to win the race. At a bar, Minerva reveals to Annie that she is an educated intellectual who plays a stereotypical hip-hop character in order to survive. Coming back to Frankenstein's room, Annie saves his life from Perfectus, who is jealous of Frankenstein's popularity and sex appeal. Meanwhile, it is discovered that Hamilton and the Chairman are working together behind the scenes.

On Day Three of the race, the government sets "approved" routes for the drivers to avoid Resistance attacks. Annie helps Frankenstein shift gears, due to his right arm being damaged in his fight with Perfectus. Minerva chases Tammy, but she falls off a cliff to avoid Tammy's suicidal proxy. Tammy gloats at Minerva's death before a returning ABE rams her against the wall and self-destructs, destroying them both. Frankenstein and Annie wipe out Hamilton and her rebels, while Perfectus takes a secret route toward the finish line. Both cars jockey for position until Perfectus loses control of his car and crashes into the virtual reality control booth. Before crossing the finish line, Frankenstein broadcasts a message to his fans, suggesting that the Chairman himself is worth 1,000 points. After killing the Chairman, Frankenstein encourages them to leave their virtual reality behind and start their own Death Race. As the country erupts into violent chaos, Frankenstein and Annie watch from the distance, suggesting that they should repopulate the country after the chaos has died down.

== Cast ==
- Manu Bennett as "Frankenstein", the cybernetic veteran Death Race champion
- Malcolm McDowell as The Chairman of the United Corporations of America; a parody of Donald Trump complete with a "slight comb-over in his hair."
- Marci Miller as Annie Sullivan, Frankenstein's proxy
- Burt Grinstead as Jed Perfectus, a genetically engineered athlete who sees himself as the perfect driver
- Folake Olowofoyeku as Minerva Jefferson, a hip-hop artist turned racer
- Anessa Ramsey as Tammy "The Terrorist", a religious cult leader
- Yancy Butler as Alexis Hamilton, a former network producer who leads a resistance group
- Charlie Farrell as J.B., the male Death Race commentator
- Shanna Olson as Grace Tickle, the female Death Race commentator and interviewer
- Leslie Shaw as Eve Rocket, Perfectus' proxy
- D.C. Douglas as ABE (voice), an evil, AI-controlled, self-driving race car
- Pierre Paolo Goya Kobashigawa as Chi Wapp, Minerva's proxy
- Sebastian Llosa as Steve, a civilian who watches the Death Race in VR through Annie's POV
- Helen Loris as Dr. Creamer, ABE's programmer

== Production ==
=== Development ===
Corman got the idea for a remake of the original film when he was being interviewed by an Italian journalist who remarked that The Hunger Games had similarities to Death Race 2000. Corman contacted Universal Pictures who had produced the modern remake (which Corman felt had jettisoned too much of the political commentary of the original) and discussed bringing back the dark satire of the original. Corman told them, "You did a good job, but you’ve taken out the killing of the pedestrians and the broken-society themes."

=== Filming ===
Filming began when Corman was in his late 80s and during the 2016 U.S. presidential election. It features a businessman who is now the Chairman of the United Corporations of America. Corman told an interviewer, “The president does have a hair style which could be approaching Trump’s hair style, but I don’t want to get too heavy into that, because Trump will come and go and the film will remain." Corman also commented on how difficult it seems to be for medium budget films to get funding, where Hollywood produces films for 100-200 million.

Principal photography began on February 8, 2016 in Lima, Peru.

== Release ==
=== Home media ===
The film was released in the U.S. on DVD and a DVD/Blu-ray combo with three making-of documentaries: The Making of 2050, The Look of 2050, and Cars! Cars! Cars!. It was released in the U.K. on March 20, 2017.

== Reception ==
=== Critical response ===
On the review aggregator website Rotten Tomatoes, 86% of 7 critics' reviews are positive, with an average rating of 6.8/10.

Writing for ComingSoon.net, Chris Alexander called the film "loud, shrill, spastic, sadistic, stylish, slipshod, stupid and smart in equal measures." Scott Weinberg, reviewing the film for Nerdist, said "all very clunky and ramshackle and kitschy, but that’s just part of the 'shaggy dog' charm of the production." And Sebastian Zavala, writing for ScreenAnarchy.com, declared "it’s got enough blood, guts, simplistic political commentary, scenery chewing and terrible special effects for it to become a cult classic." Filmink called it "not particularly memorable".
