= Mike Elliott (filmmaker) =

American film director

Mike Elliott is an American film producer, film director and writer. He has produced or co-produced over 100 films, with a special focus on direct-to-video sequels.

== Early life ==
Mike Elliott was born in Ventura, California, but raised just outside Bend, Oregon.

He graduated from Cornell University with a degree in Soviet Studies.

== Career ==
After landing intern positions at various television and film companies, Elliott found his footing interning for independent filmmaker Roger Corman and eventually became a vice-president at Corman's Concorde New Horizons, serving as liaison and producer with partner companies such as Showtime.

Elliot has said that “It got to a point where we shrugged our shoulders and slowly realized theatrical was about prestige more than it was a sales factor ... The box and the cast became more important."

In 1995, Elliott co-founded Capital Arts Entertainment with Rob Kerchner and Joe Genier.

Elliott and Capital Arts Entertainment would become pioneers in the direct-to-video sequel market, producing such films as Casper Meets Wendy, Addams Family Reunion, The Prince and Me 2, American Pie Presents: Band Camp, and Timecop 2: The Berlin Decision.

Elliott has produced After the Storm, WarGames: The Dead Code, The Eye, The Perfect Holiday, Rogue Assassin and Comic Book Villains. He made his directorial debut on Beethoven's Big Break in 2008, with sophomore directing effort Blue Crush 2 released on DVD and Blu-ray in 2011. Elliott's latest credits include Death Race 3: Inferno starring Luke Goss and Ving Rhames, Forced to Fight starring Gary Daniels and Peter Weller, and Dead in Tombstone with Danny Trejo.

== Filmography ==
Year	Title	Credit
1991	The Terror Within II	producer
1992	Bloodfist III: Forced to Fight	co-producer
1992	Bloodfist IV: Die Trying	producer
1994	Bloodfist V: Human Target	producer
1994	No Dessert, Dad, till You Mow the Lawn	producer
1995	Attack of the 60 Foot Centerfold	executive producer
1997	Casper: A Spirited Beginning	producer
1998	Casper Meets Wendy	producer
1998	Addams Family Reunion	producer
1998	Richie Rich's Christmas Wish	producer
2003	Beethoven's 5th	producer
2005	American Pie Presents: Band Camp	producer
2008	WarGames: The Dead Code	producer
2008	Beethoven's Big Break	director
2009	American Pie Presents: The Book of Love	producer
2010	Smokin' Aces 2: Assassins' Ball	producer
2010	Death Race 2	producer
2011	Blue Crush 2	director/producer
2012	Werewolf: The Beast Among Us	producer
2013	Death Race 3: Inferno	producer
2013	Dead in Tombstone	producer
2014	The Little Rascals Save the Day	producer
2015	The Scorpion King 4: Quest for Power	director/producer
2016	Kindergarten Cop 2	producer
2016	Honey 3: Dare to Dance	producer
2017	Bigger Fatter Liar	producer
2017	Bring It On: Worldwide #Cheersmack	producer
2017	Woody Woodpecker	producer
2018	Honey: Rise Up and Dance	producer
2018	Tremors: A Cold Day in Hell	producer
2018	Unbroken: Path to Redemption	producer
2018	Death Race: Beyond Anarchy	producer
2019	The Scorpion King: Book of Souls	producer
2019	Grand-Daddy Day Care	producer
2019	How High 2	producer
2019	Undercover Brother 2	producer
2020	Bulletproof 2	producer
2020	American Pie Presents: Girls' Rules	director/producer
2024	Our Little Secret	producer
