= Pressed =

- Theatrical release poster
- Directed by: Justin Donnelly
- Screenplay by: Justin Donnelly; Christopher Donaldson
- Produced by: Justin Donnelly; Jonathan DuBois
- Starring: Luke Goss; Tyler Johnston; Jeffrey Ballard; Michael Eklund
- Cinematography: Norm Li
- Edited by: Nima Soofi, Lenka Svab
- Music by: Peter Allen
- Production companies: Donnelly Entertainment Group; QubeFilm
- Release date: February 18, 2011 (Canada)
- Running time: 88 minutes (DVD cut)
- Country: Canada
- Language: English

Pressed is a 2011 Canadian crime drama film directed by Justin Donnelly and starring Luke Goss, Tyler Johnston, Jeffrey Ballard, and Michael Eklund. It is the debut directing project for Justin Donnelly.

== Plot ==
Business executive Brian Parker (played by Goss) has been fired from his job at a top investment firm and is facing serious financial troubles. He decides to invest his personal money in a dangerous drug deal that may end his problems quickly. However, two young joyriders, Jesse and Sam, steal the illicit drug money. The risky situation changes lives, some of them for good.

== Cast ==
- Luke Goss as Brian
- Michael Eklund as Jimmy
- Tyler Johnston as Jesse
- Jeffrey Ballard as Sam
- Erica Carroll as Leanne
- Andrew Hedge as Officer Black
- Craig Stanghetta as Joey 'The Boss'
