= Frederick Koehler =

American actor (born 1975)

- Born: June 16, 1975 (age 51); Jackson Heights, New York, U.S.
- Education: Carnegie Mellon University (BFA)
- Years active: 1981–present
- Known for: Kate & Allie

Frederick "Fred" Koehler (born June 16, 1975) is an American actor best known for his role as Chip Lowell on Kate & Allie as well as Andrew Schillinger on the HBO drama Oz.

== Later life ==
After Kate & Allie, Koehler attended Carnegie Mellon University, from where he said he received "a huge education in theater."

== Filmography ==
- (1983) Mr. Mom – Alex Butler
- (1987) The Pick-up Artist – Richie
- (1991) A Kiss Before Dying – Mickey
- (2001) Pearl Harbor – Wounded Sailor #3
- (2002) Divine Secrets of the Ya-Ya Sisterhood – Pete Abbott
- (2002) A.K.A. Birdseye – Ben Sharpless
- (2005) Dependency – Dave
- (2005) Domino – Chuckie
- (2005) Touched – Thomas Martin
- (2006) Little Chenier – Pemon Dupuis
- (2008) Death Race – Lists
- (2010) Death Race 2 – Lists
- (2013) Death Race 3: Inferno – Lists
- (2017) The Evil Within – Dennis
- (2018) Death Race: Beyond Anarchy – Lists
- (2021) The Little Things – Stan Peters

=== Television ===
- (1982–1985) Saturday Night Live - Young Howard Cosell/Various Roles
- (1984) The Almost Royal Family (TV movie) – Jimmy Henderson
- (1984) He's Fired, She's Hired (TV movie) – Lexy Grier
- (1984–1989) Kate & Allie – Chip Lowell (98 episodes)
- (1985) Tender Places (TV movie) – Eric
- (1989) Night Walk (TV movie) – Eric Miller
- (1993) The Positively True Adventures of the Alleged Texas Cheerleader-Murdering Mom (TV movie) – Shane Harper
- (1997–1998) All My Children – Oyster Cracker (episode 7220)
- (1999) Paramour (TV miniseries) – Unknown
- (1999–2003) Oz – #99S333 Andrew Schillinger (4 episodes)
- (1999) Strangers with Candy – Ricky (Season 1, episode 5 "Bogie Nights")
- (2000) Bull – Joey Rutigliano (recurring cast)
- (2001) CSI: Crime Scene Investigation – Danny Hillman (Season 1, episode 12 "Fahrenheit 932")
- (2002) Charmed – Necron's Lackey (Season 5, episode 1 "A Witch's Tail")
- (2002) NYPD Blue - Michael Cardillo (Season 10, episode 10 "Healthy McDowell Movement")
- (2002) Taken (TV miniseries) – Lester
- (2004) Touching Evil (TV miniseries)
- (2004) Cold Case – Neil Beaudry (Season 2, episode 6 "The Sleepover")
- (2004) Malcolm in the Middle – Mellon (Season 5, episode 9 "Dirty Magazine")
- (2004) Joan of Arcadia – Ramsey (Season 1, episode 11 "The Uncertainty Principle")
- (2004) Boston Legal - Jason Binder (Season 1, episode 5 "Eye for an Eye")
- (2005) ER - Benjamin Coe (Season 11, episode 16 "Refusal of Care")
- (2006) Pepper Dennis – Leslie Gaye (recurring cast))
- (2008) The Mentalist – Tommy Olds (Season 1, episode 9 "Flame Red")
- (2009) Castle – Adam Pike (Season 1, episode 8 "Ghosts")
- (2010) Lost – Seamus (Season 6 recurring cast)
- (2011) Torchwood: Miracle Day – Ralph Coltrane (Season 4, episode 5 "The Categories of Life", 6 "The Middle Men")
- (2011) Bones – Scott Kimper (Season 6, episode 7 "The Babe in the Bar")
- (2011) Southland – a junky (Season 3, episode 8 "Fixing a Hole")
- (2012) Grimm – Martin Burgess (Season 1, episode 9 "Of Mouse and Man")
- (2013) NCIS – Simon Gravy (Season 10, episode 23 "Double Blind")
- (2013) Criminal Minds – Wallace Hines and Jesse Gentry (Season 9, episodes 1 "The Inspiration", 2 "The Inspired")
- (2014) Perception – George "The Ghost" (Season 3, episode 2 "Painless")
- (2014) Bosch - Mark Taylor (Season 3, episode 8 "Aye Papi")
- (2015) Backstrom – Wesley Lewis (Season 1, episode 5 "Bogeyman")
- (2015) CSI: Cyber – Oliver Crispin (Season 2 episode 4 "Red Crone")
- (2016) Major Crimes – Sean Wheeler (Season 5, episode 8 "Off the Wagon")
- (2016) American Horror Story: Roanoke - Lot Polk (Season 6, 4 episodes)
- (2017) Brooklyn Nine-Nine – Becca Boyle (Season 5, episode 9 "99", Season 8, episode 7 "Game of Boyles")
- (2019) NCIS: New Orleans – Elliot Whitman (Season 6, episode 3 "Bad Apple")
- (2024) 9-1-1 - Mr. Gates (Season 8, Episode 4 “No Place Like Home”)
- (2025) Stranger Things - Scientist (Season 5, episode 6: "Chapter Six: Escape from Camazotz")

== Theatre work ==
- (1998) The Cripple of Inishmaan – (Geffen Playhouse, Los Angeles) – Cripple Billy
- (1998) When I Was a Girl I Used to Scream and Shout – (New York City) – Ewan
- (2013) The Normal Heart - (Los Angeles) - Mickey Marcus
