= Christine Marzano =

American model, actress and CEO (born 1986)

- Born: September 5, 1986 (age 40); Brooklyn, NY
- Education: Princeton University; British American Drama Academy
- Occupations: CEO/Founder of BODS; Co-founder of DNABlock; model; actress
- Years active: 2004–present
- Modeling information
- Height: 5 ft 11 in (1.80 m)
- Hair color: Blonde
- Eye color: Blue

Christine Marzano (born September 5, 1986) is an American entrepreneur, former actress and international fashion model. She is a graduate of Princeton University. She co-founded the SoftBank backed, digital likeness protection company, DNAblock after becoming the first model to create and protect her own digital likeness, and then went on to become the CEO and founder of the avatar based, fashion tech company BODS, which was acquired in 2026. She is a Vogue 100 Tech Innovator and is an established speaker at the intersection of technology and fashion.

== Early life and education ==
Marzano was born in Brooklyn, New York . She attended Edward R Murrow High Schoolwent on to receive a bachelor's degree in psychology and neuroscience from Princeton University, and later studied Shakespeare at the British American Drama Academy in London.

== Career ==
=== Modeling ===
She started her career as the Winner of the Elite Model Look USA competition and went on to be a finalist at the Elite Model Look World competition. She signed with Elite Model Management and walked the International runways for luxury brands; opening for Dries Van Noten and walking for Christian Dior, YSL, Gucci, Fendi, Balmain, John Galliano, Thierry Mugler, Giorgio Armani, MaxMara, Peter Som, to name a few. She also appeared in fashion magazines such as Vogue, Elle, Harper's Bazaar, V magazine, etc. In 2017, and years after her modeling debut, she became the first model to create a digital double of her likeness for use in licensed modeling work.

=== Acting ===
While modeling, Marzano began serious acting training, and appeared in numerous television commercials. After graduating from Princeton, and studying at the British American Drama Academy in London, she decided to pursue acting full-time.

Marzano appeared as a bilingual prostitute in Oscar winner Martin Mcdonagh's Seven Psychopaths (2012), working alongside a stellar cast including Sam Rockwell, Woody Harrelson, Christopher Walken and Colin Farrell. The cast won Best Ensemble Cast at the 2012 Boston Society of Film Critics Awards, and nominated in the same category at the 2012 San Diego Film Critics Society Awards. She had a supporting role as a brothel madam in Oscar winner Neil Jordan's vampire film Byzantium alongside Saoirse Ronan and Gemma Arterton, and appeared in the 2013 thriller Paranoia as a corporate executive reporting to Harrison Ford. She portrayed celebrity florist and landscape designer Charlotte Heavey in the 2015 film Dare to Be Wild and appeared in the 2016 Harry Potter prequel Fantastic Beasts and Where to Find Them, written by JK Rowling and directed by David Yates.

She has also appeared in the 2018 American action film Death Race: Beyond Anarchy alongside Danny Trejo and Danny Glover, the fourth film in the Death Race series which has garnered a massive cult following.

=== Entrepreneurship ===
While becoming the first model to create her own protected digital likeness for use in modeling work, she co-founded Dnablock, a digital likeness and avatar protection company in 2017. In 2020, during the pandemic, when no clothing could be tried on in store, she used her learnings in 3D graphics to found the avatar based, virtual try on company, BODS. BODS raised venture funding from investors including Stellation Capital, Long Journey Ventures, and from strategic Angel investors, including Karlie Kloss and others The BODS experience launched across luxury fashion brand websites including Balmain and Khaite, to help customers find their perfect size and reduce wasteful returns. BODS partnered with Epic games and Unreal engine as the first company to bring realtime 3D graphics to fashion e-commerce. In 2023 Christine was named as one of Vogue 100 tech innovators In early 2026, the BODS technology was acquired by a leading American luxury fashion and lifestyle brand.

== Personal life ==
Marzano has dual Irish-US citizenship, and lives in Los Angeles, California.

== Filmography ==
=== Film ===
Year	Title	Role	Notes
2010	Working It Out	Natasha	
2012	Seven Psychopaths	The Hooker	Won Best Ensemble Cast at the 2012 Boston Society of Film Critics Awards
2012	Byzantium	Mrs. Strange	
2013	Paranoia	Nora Summers	
2015	Dare to Be Wild	Charlotte "Shah" Heavey	
2016	Rules Don't Apply	Carrie	
2016	Fantastic Beasts and Where to Find Them	Exterminator	
2017	A Midsummer Night's Dream	Mustardseed	
2017	Moss	Mary	
2018	Death Race: Beyond Anarchy	Jane	
2019	Eve	Alex Beyer	

=== Television ===
Year	Title	Role	Notes
2012	Fashion Star	Herself	8 episodes in season 1 (NBC)
2014	Anger Management	Ashley	Season 2, episode 86 (FX)
