= Tony Giglio =

American film director

- Born: June 3, 1971 (age 55); Medford, Massachusetts, United States
- Occupation: Film director

Tony Giglio (born June 3, 1971) is an American film director from Medford, Massachusetts. He graduated from Seton Hall University in 1993 with a Bachelor of Arts degree.

== Filmography ==
=== Director ===
| Years | Title | Notes |
|---|---|---|
| 1999 | Soccer Dog: The Movie | |
| 2004 | In Enemy Hands | |
| 2005 | Chaos | |
| 2007 | Timber Falls | |
| 2013 | Extraction | |
| 2017 | S.W.A.T.: Under Siege | |
| 2019 | Doom: Annihilation | |

=== Writer ===
| Years | Title | Notes |
|---|---|---|
| 1999 | Soccer Dog: The Movie | Uncredited; also producer |
| 2004 | In Enemy Hands | |
| 2005 | Chaos | |
| 2007 | Timber Falls | Uncredited |
| 2010 | Death Race 2 | |
| 2013 | Death Race 3: Inferno | |
| 2018 | Death Race: Beyond Anarchy | |
| 2019 | Doom: Annihilation | |
| 2026 | Beware Boiúna | |

=== Set production assistant ===
| Years | Title | Notes |
|---|---|---|
| 1995 | The Quick and the Dead | |
| 1995 | Kicking and Screaming | |
| 1995 | Heat | |
| 1996 | Fear | |
| 1996 | Celtic Pride | |
| 1996 | Escape from L.A. | |
| 1996 | Bulletproof | |
| 1996 | Jingle All the Way | |
| 1996 | T2 3-D: Battle Across Time | |
| 1997 | Liar Liar | |
| 1997 | Dante's Peak | |
| 1997 | Quiet Days in Hollywood | 2nd assistant director |

=== Actor ===
| Years | Title | Role | Notes |
|---|---|---|---|
| 1993 | Lois & Clark: The New Adventures of Superman | G.E. Mallow | TV series |
| 1995 | Kicking and Screaming | Singing Freshman #1 | Film |
