= Death Race (2008 film) =

2008 film by Paul W. S. Anderson

- Theatrical release poster
- Directed by: Paul W. S. Anderson
- Written by: Paul W. S. Anderson
- Based on: Death Race 2000 by Robert Thom Charles B. Griffith; "The Racer" by Ib Melchior
- Produced by: Paula Wagner; Jeremy Bolt; Paul W. S. Anderson
- Starring: Jason Statham; Tyrese Gibson; Ian McShane; Joan Allen
- Cinematography: Scott Kevan
- Edited by: Niven Howie
- Music by: Paul Haslinger
- Production companies: Universal Pictures; Relativity Media; Impact Pictures; C/W Productions (Note: Universal Pictures is credited as the presenter, co-financer, and co-production company of the film. Relativity Media is credited as a co-financer and co-production company alongside Universal, while Impact Pictures and C/W Productions are credited as the production companies.)
- Distributed by: Universal Pictures
- Release dates: August 22, 2008 (United States); September 26, 2008 (United Kingdom)
- Running time: 105 minutes
- Countries: United States; United Kingdom (Note: Death Race is considered a co-production of the United States and United Kingdom.)
- Language: English
- Budget: $45 million
- Box office: $76 million

Death Race is a 2008 dystopian action film written and directed by Paul W. S. Anderson, who produced the film alongside Paula Wagner and Jeremy Bolt. The film stars Jason Statham as Jensen Ames, a factory worker framed for a murder he didn't commit, who is coerced into the Death Race, a three-day racing competition at Terminal Island Penitentiary, in an attempt to win his freedom. The ensemble cast includes Tyrese Gibson, Ian McShane, Natalie Martinez, Jacob Vargas, Max Ryan, Jason Clarke, Frederick Koehler, Robert LaSardo, Robin Shou, and Joan Allen.

Though referred to as a remake of the 1975 film Death Race 2000 (which in turn is based on Ib Melchior's short story "The Racer") in reviews and marketing materials, Anderson stated in the DVD commentary that he thought of the film as something of a prequel. A Death Race remake had been in development since 2002, though production was delayed by disapproval of early screenplays, then placed in turnaround following a dispute between Paramount Pictures and the producer duo Tom Cruise and Wagner (the latter of whom produced without Cruise in the film). The rights to Death Race was acquired by Universal Pictures, and Anderson re-joined the project to write and direct. Filming commenced in Montreal in August 2007.

Death Race was released in the United States on August 22, 2008, and in the United Kingdom on September 26, by Universal Pictures. It received mixed reviews from critics and was a financial disappointment, grossing $76 million on a budget of $45–65 million. Three direct-to-video films were released in the years that followed: Death Race 2 (2010), Death Race 3: Inferno (2013) and Death Race: Beyond Anarchy (2018).

== Plot ==
In 2012, the United States' failed economy and rising crime rates led to an increased number of privatized prisons. At one such prison, Terminal Island Penitentiary, Warden Claire Hennessey profits from livestreaming Death Race, a three-day event where inmates race weaponized cars on a trap-filled track to win their freedom.

In 2020, popular masked Death Race driver Frankenstein approaches the finish line, pursued by his rival "Machine Gun Joe". The former's navigator, Case, says his weapons have malfunctioned and urges him to stop. Requiring one more win for his freedom, he refuses. She ejects before Joe destroys Frankenstein's car, killing him.

Industrial worker and ex-con Jensen Ames, who used to be a well-known, successful racer, now struggles to support his family as the steel mill he works at closes. When he returns home, a masked attacker knocks him out. He wakes with a bloodied knife and his wife Suzy dead, before he is arrested. Framed for murder, he is sentenced to life imprisonment while his baby daughter Piper goes into foster care.

Six months later, Jensen is transferred to Terminal Island, where Hennessey offers him freedom in exchange for standing in for Frankenstein at the latest Death Race. Jensen accepts and meets Frankenstein's pit crew, Coach, Gunner, and Lists, who suspect Hennessey is using him to increase ratings. On the first day of the event, Jensen meets Case, who reveals their car's weapons are malfunctioning again. He becomes distracted after recognizing another driver, Pachenko, as Suzy's killer. Jensen confronts Pachenko, who admits Hennessey ordered him to frame Jensen so she could use him and his racing talent to replace the previous Frankenstein.

On the second day, Jensen threatens to eject Case unless she reveals the truth about the malfunctions. She admits she was offered release papers in exchange for sabotaging Frankenstein's car to keep him from winning so Hennessey wouldn't have to free him. Jensen tricks Pachenko into crashing his car, then kills him by snapping his neck. Hennessey releases the "Dreadnought", a multi-weapon tanker truck, to further increase ratings and kill off drivers; Jensen and Joe work together to lure it into a trap and destroy it. The day ends with them as the only survivors. Aware that Jensen knows she won't let him win so as to keep him, Hennessey orders her second-in-command Ulrich to plant a bomb underneath Jensen's car. Jensen approaches Joe and proposes a plan.

In the final race, Hennessey sabotages Jensen's chances at winning before he and Joe exploit a weak spot created during the first race to escape to the mainland bridge. Hennessey and Ulrich shut down the livestream, deactivate the cars' weaponry, and send guards. She attempts to activate the bomb, unaware that Coach has found, disarmed, and removed it. Upon reaching a railway depot, Jensen secretly jumps out and escapes on a freight train with Joe while Case, disguised as Frankenstein, allows herself to be captured. Pleased by the ratings, Hennessey opens a present, only to find the bomb. Coach detonates it, killing her and Ulrich.

Six months later, Jensen and Joe have become mechanics in Mexico, with Piper finally in Jensen's custody, and reunite with Case.

== Cast ==
- Jason Statham as Jensen Ames, a prisoner who was falsely accused of killing his wife and forced to take part in the Death Race as "Frankenstein".
- Joan Allen as Warden Claire Hennessey, the prison warden of Terminal Island Penitentiary and overseer of the Death Race.
- Ian McShane as "Coach", Frankenstein's loyal head mechanic and a voluntary inmate who feels that the outside world is not worthy enough.
- Tyrese Gibson as Joseph "Machine Gun Joe" Mason, an inmate, racer, and Frankenstein's rival who seeks to use the Death Race to escape Terminal Island.
- Natalie Martinez as Casey "Case", Frankenstein's navigator who was imprisoned for killing her abusive husband and tasked by Hennessey with sabotaging Frankenstein in exchange for release papers.
- Max Ryan as Slovo Pachenko, a Russian inmate and the leader of a prison gang called the Aryan Brotherhood who Hennessey tasked with killing Jensen's wife and framing him for it.
- Jason Clarke as Ulrich, Hennessey's second in-command and a prison guard.
- Frederick Koehler as "Lists", a member of Frankenstein's pit crew and a compulsive data collector who is in prison for murdering his abusive mother.
- Jacob Vargas as Gunner, a member of Frankenstein's pit crew.
- Justin Mader as Travis Colt, a disgraced ex-NASCAR driver seeking to rebuild his career by winning the Death Race.
- Robert LaSardo as Hector "The Grim Reaper" Grimm, an inmate who worships Hennessey as an avatar of the Hindu goddess Kali.
- Robin Shou as "14K", a tenth-generation triad member who holds a degree from MIT.

Additionally, David Carradine makes a vocal cameo appearance as Jensen's unnamed predecessor as Frankenstein, reprising the role from Death Race 2000.

== Production ==
In March 2005, following the success of Alien vs. Predator (2004), director Paul W. S. Anderson revealed that he was directing a remake of Death Race 2000 (1975) entitled Death Race 3000 at Paramount Pictures based on a script by J. F. Lawton. The remake would be produced by the producer pair Tom Cruise and Paula Wagner. Anderson described the remake as a riff on the first film. "It's not a straight remake at all. The first movie was an across-America race. This will be an around-the-world race. And it's set further in the future, so the cars are even more futuristic. So you've got cars with rockets, machine guns, force fields; cars that can split apart and re-form, a bit like Transformers. Cars that become invisible," the director explained. Comingsoon.net reported that "Paul saw his film almost as a prequel if anything; almost the genesis of the Death Race", though the film is referred to primarily as a remake in reviews and marketing materials.

Two years later, Roger Corman, the producer of Death Race 2000, elaborated that he had an option agreement with producer Tom Cruise, and that Cruise would portray the lead role. The director said that Cruise had not been happy with the first two screenplays and that a third one was underway. In June 2006, producer Jeremy Bolt reported that Anderson would direct the remake of Death Race 2000 after completing Resident Evil: Extinction (2007). The producer described the remake's new tone: "We've basically taken the idea of reality television and extended it twenty years. So it's definitely a comment on society, and particularly reality television, but it is not as much a parody or a satire as the original. It's more straight." The following August, Paramount ended its relationship with Cruise/Wagner Productions, and Death Race was placed in turnaround. According to reports, when the project was discovered available, Universal Studios acquired it. Wagner resumed her role as producer without Cruise, and Anderson returned to write and direct the film.

In April 2007, actor Jason Statham entered negotiations to star in Death Race, with production slated to begin in late summer or early fall. Anderson described that Death Race would take place in a prison, and that the film would be "super-violent" like its predecessor. "It has little echoes of the original – a lot of people get run down, but rather than having the points system, which had no pay off anyway, it's a pure race. It's more like Gladiator, with the last person standing – or driving, winning," explained the director. Filming on Death Race began in Montreal in August 2007.

== Music ==
Death Race (Original Motion Picture Soundtrack)

Soundtrack album by Paul Haslinger
- Released: August 19, 2008
- Recorded: 2008
- Studio: Sony Pictures Scoring Stage
- Genres: Film score; rock
- Length: 41:10
- Labels: Back Lot; Intrada
- Producer: Paul Haslinger

The score to Death Race was composed by Paul Haslinger and conducted by Tim Davies. Haslinger recorded the string portion of his score with the Hollywood Studio Symphony at the Sony Scoring Stage.

The soundtrack was released on August 19, 2008, by Back Lot Music and Intrada Records.

=== Track listing ===
No.	Title	Length
1.	"A Hard Sport for a Hard Age"	1:48
2.	"Grim the Reaper"	1:39
3.	"Death Race Main Titles"	3:01
4.	"Riot"	1:12
5.	"Prison Arrival"	2:28
6.	"Meet the Monster"	1:51
7.	"Punch It!"	3:42
8.	"Frank Walk"	2:08
9.	"Hennessey"	0:11
10.	"Say What?"	1:58
11.	"Man on a Rampage"	2:35
12.	"You Are Not Fit for Society"	3:05
13.	"Lose Him or Kill Him"	1:40
14.	"Solitary"	0:43
15.	"The Final Race"	4:18
16.	"Good Luck Joe"	2:08
17.	"Frank Surrenders"	0:58
18.	"Terminal"	1:19
19.	"A Chance for Something Else"	4:16
Total length:		41:10

== Release ==
Death Race was theatrically released in the United States on August 22, 2008, by Universal Pictures. The film was originally scheduled for release on September 26, 2008, but was moved to its current release date; the September 26 release date was kept for the film's release in the United Kingdom.

=== Home media ===
The DVD and Blu-ray were released in the United States on December 21, 2008. There was also an unrated edition released. The Blu-ray version of the movie features a Digital Copy of the film. In the DVD commentary, Anderson further elaborates on his thought of the movie as a prequel more than a remake.

== Reception ==
=== Box office ===
Death Race grossed $36.3 million in the United States and Canada, and $39.7 million in other territories, for a worldwide total of $76 million. Opening on August 22, 2008, to 2,532 theaters, it grossed $12.6 million in its opening weekend, during the closing of the 2008 Summer Olympics.

=== Critical response ===
The film received mixed reviews from critics. On the review aggregation website Rotten Tomatoes, 41% of 155 critics' reviews are positive, with average rating of 5.2/10. The website's consensus reads, "Mindless, violent, and lightning-paced, Death Race is little more than an empty action romp." Metacritic, which uses a weighted average, assigned the film a score of 43 out of 100, based on 24 critics, indicating "mixed or average" reviews. Audiences polled by CinemaScore during opening weekend gave the film an average grade of "B+" on a scale ranging from A+ to F.

Robert Koehler of Variety called Death Race "as hard as metal and just as dumb" and criticised it for removing the humor of Death Race 2000. Roger Ebert of the Chicago Sun-Times gave the film half a star (out of four), calling it "an assault on all the senses, including common." Keith Phipps of the A. V. Club said the film is "ideal for those who want to watch a bunch of cars blow each other up, without having to think about it all that much." Marc Savlov of the Austin Chronicle called Death Race "one of the most boring drags of all time."

Peter Hartlaub of the San Francisco Chronicle called the film "an ill-advised and severely wussified remake." Elizabeth Weitzman of the New York Daily News gave the film one and a half stars (out of four), calling it "junk", and saying that "the chases are pretty cool, but there's absolutely nothing else to see." A positive review came from Nathan Lee of The New York Times, who said that "the movie is legitimately greasy, authentically nasty, with a good old-fashioned sense of laying waste to everything in sight." James Berardinelli of ReelViews awarded Death Race a score of two and a half stars (out of four), saying that it's "weak when it comes to things like plot, character, and acting, but it's very good at provoking visceral reactions."

== Prequels and sequel ==
The film is followed by two direct-to-video prequel films, Death Race 2 (2010) and Death Race 3: Inferno (2013). Both take place before this film and were filmed in South Africa. The films were directed by Roel Reiné, and star Luke Goss, Tanit Phoenix, Danny Trejo and Ving Rhames all appeared in the prequels. Lists and 14K are the only returning characters and are portrayed by Frederick Koehler and Robin Shou, respectively. A fourth film is a direct-to-video sequel to the first film, titled Death Race: Beyond Anarchy (2018), also featuring Lists, making him the only character to appear and be played by the same actor in all four films.
