= Foreshore Freeway Bridge =

Incomplete bridge in Cape Town, South Africa

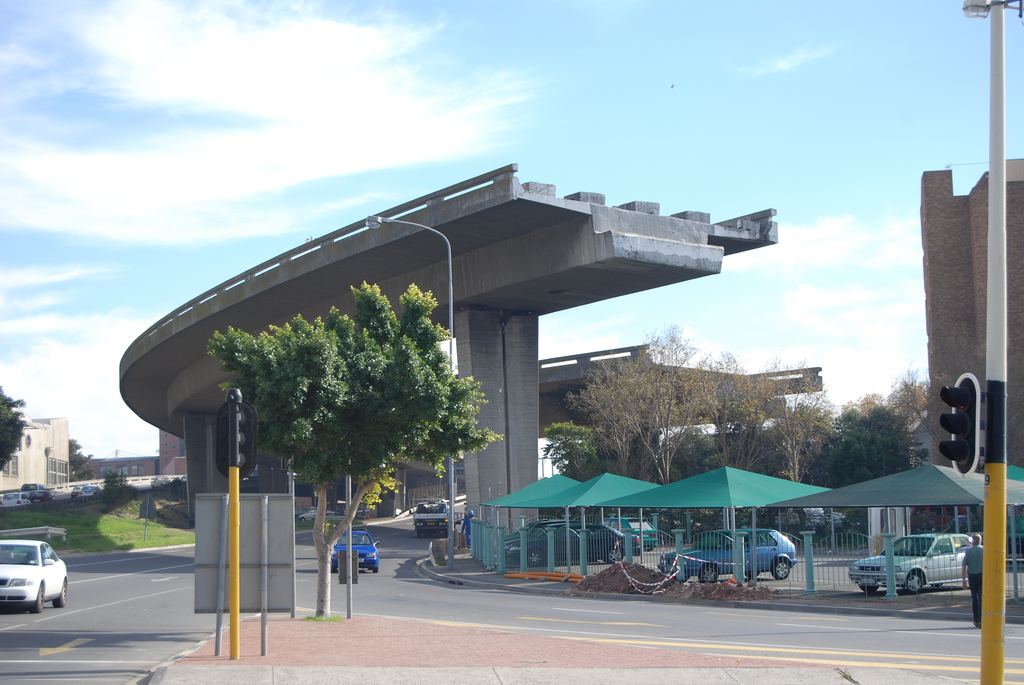
- The bridge circa 2007
- Coordinates: 33°54′53.18″S 18°25′18.50″E
- Carries: Unfinished (vehicles intended)
- Crosses: Port Road and Helen Suzman Boulevard
- Locale: Cape Town CBD, Cape Town, Western Cape
- Owner: City of Cape Town

Characteristics
- Design: Elevated freeway
- Material: Concrete
- No. of lanes: 4 (2 per carriageway)

History
- Built: 1970s; 55 years ago (partial)
- Replaced by: Foreshore Precinct Project (proposed)

Location
- Interactive map of Foreshore Freeway Bridge

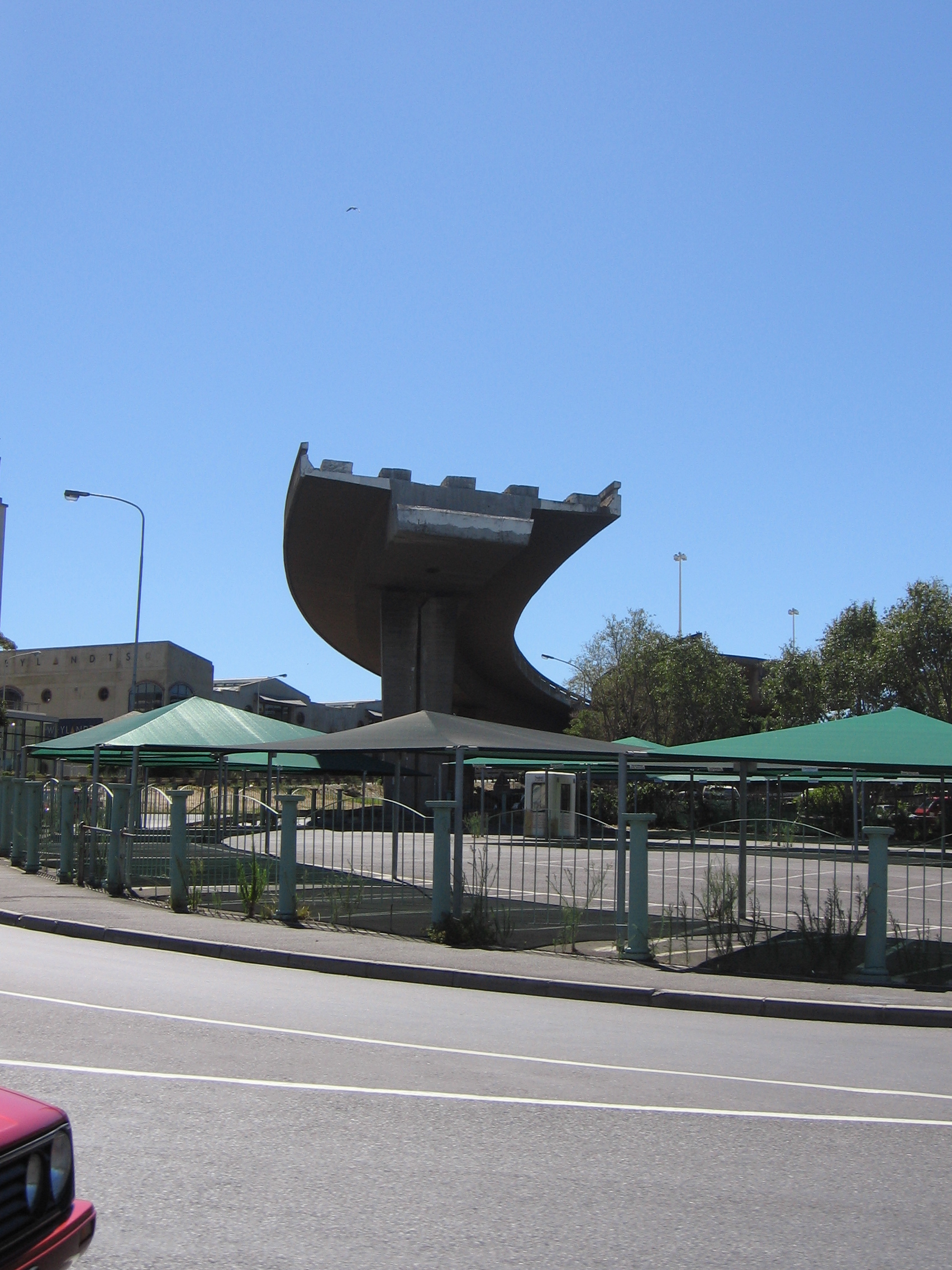
The bridge looking west

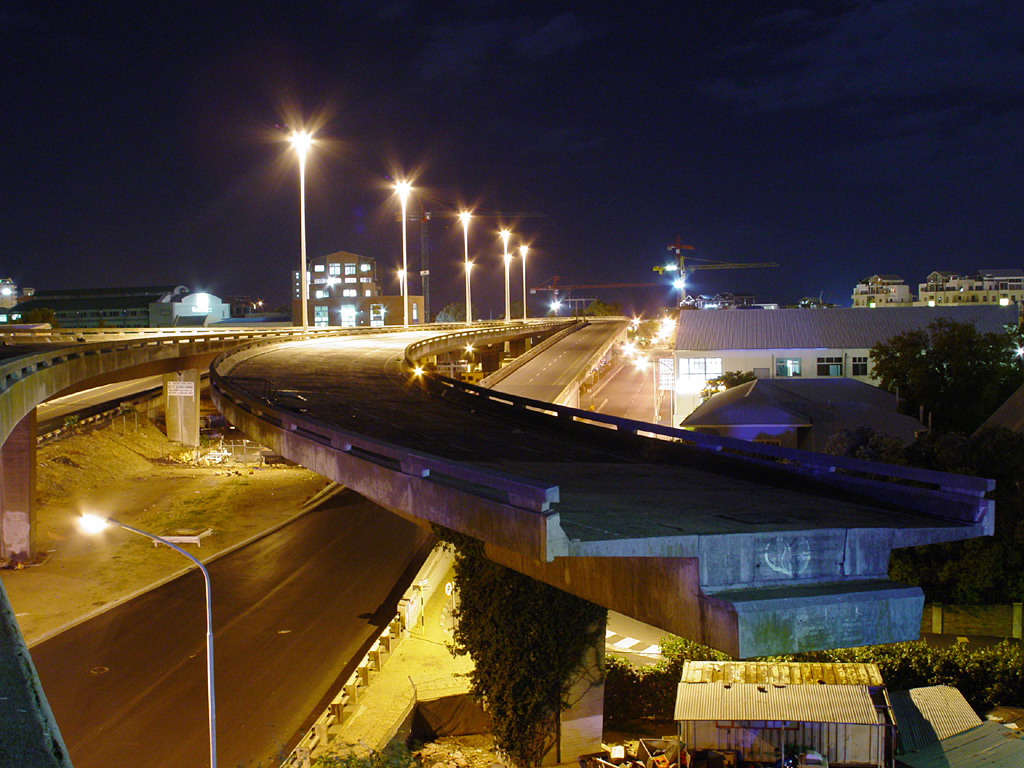
Foreshore Freeway Bridge at night

The Foreshore Freeway Bridge, also known as Cape Town's Unfinished Bridge, is an incomplete section of what was intended to be the Eastern Boulevard Highway. It is located in Cape Town CBD, the main economic hub of Cape Town, South Africa.

Conceptualised and designed in the late 1960s, work began in the early 1970s with the freeway aimed at alleviating future traffic congestion in the city expected in the years to come. However, due to budget constraints in city expenditure at the time, the project never came to completion and has stood in its unfinished state since construction officially ended in 1977. The structure has become somewhat of a tourist attraction over the years and is also a popular movie and fashion shoot location.

In July 2026, the City of Cape Town announced it had formally decided to complete the bridge, and that progress had already been made in planning for such. The City said it would announce more details in September that same year, including some of its first designs which would be open for public comment.

The City's new proposal was released in October 2026. It involves completely redeveloping the site through new bridge links, a tunnel, the demolishment of the old Foreshore Freeway Bridge, extending CBD streets towards the harbor, as well as building a new promenade and parks. A construction date has not been set yet, and the new proposal will involve public consultation before being finalized.

== History ==
During the 1940s and 1950s the planners and engineers of Cape Town were wrapped up in discussions about proposed road infrastructure on the city's Foreshore and as various alternatives were debated, tensions between National, Provincial, the City government and the Foreshore Board surfaced. Solomon "Solly" Simon Morris was the City Engineer at the time who proposed relocating Eastern and Western Boulevards and including a ring highway to "allow for circulation with as little disturbance as possible and a speedy entrance and exit". In doing so, Morris was further instilling the popular post-War sentiment of a future associated with faster cars and bigger highways.

Construction on the project eventually got off the ground in the early 1970s but was brought to an abrupt halt in 1977 with no clear explanation given at the time. As a result, several urban legends have surfaced over the years. One is that the design team had made a calculation error resulting in the two ends failing to link up.

Another was that construction was halted due to a disgruntled shop owner who refused to sell his property that stood where the flyover would pass. However, the official explanation to date is that the city had run out of money with traffic numbers at the time not justifying its continuation and the project had to be abandoned.

During the 2010 World Cup Soccer tournament hosted by South Africa, the world's largest (35 m (114.83 ft)) operational vuvuzela sponsored by Hyundai was mounted on the western side and meant to sound at the start of each game. The city council, however, decided not to use it as the jarring sound and volume level was a cause of concern.

At the 2012 launch of the Transport for Cape Town initiative, the Dean of the Faculty of Engineering and the Built Environment at the University of Cape Town, Professor Francis Petersen, announced a partnership between the City of Cape Town and the University to examine the future of the incomplete foreshore freeway.

During a presentation in April 2014 at the Cape Town City Hall, approximately 600 students exhibited their ideas. Some of these included planting trees on the overpass, turning it into a roller coaster or skate park, creating a street arcade below and also possibly some sort of waterway.

Then-Mayor of Cape Town Patricia de Lille, present at the exhibition said "it was important to use Cape Town's designation as World Design Capital as an opportunity to think differently". Once the exhibition closed UCT handed the students' projects over to the Transport for Cape Town committee for evaluation with a decision yet to be announced.

In 2015, the City of Cape Town started using the bridge's western top deck as a designated parking area.

By 2023, the bridge area was used as an unofficial encampment for the homeless.

In July 2026, the Cape Town Mayor Geordin Hill-Lewis announced that the City had formally decided to complete the bridge, and that progress had already been made in planning for such. He said that more details would be announced in September 2026, including some of the City's first designs, which would be open for public comment.

=== Redevelopment ===
A 3D model of the City of Cape Town's proposed 2026 Foreshore Precinct Project

In October 2026, Hill-Lewis unveiled the City's plans for the bridge, as part of the new Foreshore Precinct Project. The new proposal, which will be open to public consultation, does not involve finishing construction on the existing bridges. Instead, it involves two phases. First, a new bridge constructed over Buitengracht Street that will link the inbound freeway to Helen Suzman Boulevard (the M6). Second, a link bridge and tunnel will be constructed, to connect to the outbound highways. Once the two phases are complete, the old Foreshore Freeway Bridge will be demolished, so that the space it occupies will be freed up for new Cape Town CBD developments.

The Mayor said the new proposal would enable the extension of CBD streets towards the harbor, and the creation of a new full-length promenade and new parks. The City also released a video render of the proposal. No construction date has been set yet. At the announcement, the City said it would release more information about the public consultation phase within a few months, and said it would involve road scheme amendments, heritage impact assessments, and other statutory requirements. As part of the planning process, the City launched an online hub, where Capetonians could read about the

== 2026 proposal for redevelopment ==
As of October 2026, the latest proposal being advocated for by the City of Cape Town is called the Foreshore Precinct Project, and involves the following:

=== Phase 1 ===
- The goal of commencing construction during the next term of office of the Council
- Two additional inbound lanes on the freeways
- A link bridge from the inbound freeways to Helen Suzman Boulevard (the M6)
- New elevated outbound ramp to connect Buitengracht Street over Dock Road to the existing outbound freeway
- Turning FW de Klerk Boulevard into a pedestrian-oriented street
- A new canal linking Buitengracht Park to the V&A Canal
- A new park created under the Buitengracht link bridge
- Bus lanes implemented across Buitengracht Street
- Three land parcels become available for a new residential area

=== Phase 2 ===
- A new outbound bridge linking Helen Suzman Boulevard with the outbound tunnel
- A tunnel constructed on vacant land between the Port and Customs House, from where it will continue next to Duncan Road to link with the N1 and N2 freeways
- Demolishing of the outbound elevated freeway viaduct
- The creation of a promenade, parks, and other public spaces along the harbor
- All remaining land parcels become available for development
- Construction of the larger second phase set to run until 2040
