= Marci Miller =

American model and actress (born 1988)

- Born: August 2, 1988 (age 38); North Liberty, Indiana, U.S.
- Education: Bethel College
- Occupations: Actress; singer
- Years active: 2009–present
- Spouse: Ryan Matteson (m. 2013)
- Children: 1

Marci Miller (born August 2, 1988) is an American actress. She portrayed the role of Abigail Deveraux on the NBC/Peacock soap opera Days of Our Lives from 2016 to 2018 and from 2020 to 2022. Miller's performance of Abigail has been met with critical acclaim, earning three Daytime Emmy Award nominations for Outstanding Lead Actress in a Drama Series in 2018, 2019 and 2022.

== Early life ==
Miller was born and raised in the small farming town of North Liberty, Indiana (pop 1,900), and attended the local John Glenn High School, where she excelled in basketball and theatre. She studied Vocal Performance at nearby Bethel College. After graduating college, she moved to Louisville, Kentucky, to pursue theatrical opportunities followed by moving to Los Angeles where she studied Film Master Class at Baron Brown Studio, in Santa Monica, California. Miller has a younger sister who is named after the iconic Days of Our Lives character, Kayla Brady.

== Career ==
In late 2015, Miller joined the cast of American Fable as Gavin MacIntosh's mother, in the lead role of Sarah. In June 2016, it was announced that Miller had joined the cast of Days of Our Lives, in the role of Abigail Deveraux, making her first appearance on November 10. In addition to her aforementioned roles, she has starred in a number of movies, including: Most Likely to Die, J Plus C, Children of the Corn: Runaway and Death Race 2050, as well as a number of short films. In May 2018, Soap Opera Digest announced Miller had opted not to renew her deal with Days of Our Lives and would exit the role. In June 2020, it was announced that Miller would return to the role. In February 2021, Miller and husband Ryan were featured as a rollerskating couple in a music video for disco pop duo JUICYPEAR’s single “Keep Your Love On.”

== Personal life ==
Miller is married to Ryan Matteson. She also helps with her husband's organic farm-to-table business, KaleCart.

Marci gave birth to their daughter in March 2021.

== Filmography ==
Film and television roles
Year	Title	Role	Notes
2009	The Perfect Gift	Brandi	Film
2014	The Aspect Ratio	Nicole	Film
2014	The Amateur	Jessica	Film
2015	Most Likely to Die	Simone	Film
2016	American Fable	Sarah	Film
2016	Parallel Worlds: A New Rock Music Experience	Ella	Film
2016	XOXO	Alien Girl	Film
2016	J plus C	Eve Summers	Film
2016–18, 2020–22	Days of Our Lives	Abigail Deveraux	Series regular; role held from: November 10, 2016, to November 19, 2018
2017	Death Race 2050	Annie Sullivan	Direct-to-video film
2017	End of Fall	Molly Nelson	Film
2018	Gods of Medicine	Kendall Bryant	Episode: Pilot
2018	Children of the Corn: Runaway	Ruth / Sandy	Direct-to-video film
2019	F.E.A.R	Josephine 'Joe' Allister	Filming
2020	Sinister Stalker	Karen	Television film
2025	The Pitt	Gina Phillips	Episode: "2:00 P.M."

== Awards and nominations ==
Career awards and nominations for Marci Miller
Year	Award	Category	Work	Result	Ref.
2018	Daytime Emmy Award	Outstanding Lead Actress in a Drama Series	Days of Our Lives	Nominated	
2019	Daytime Emmy Award	Outstanding Lead Actress in a Drama Series	Days of Our Lives	Nominated	
2022	Daytime Emmy Award	Outstanding Lead Actress in a Drama Series	Days of Our Lives	Nominated	
