= Tanit Phoenix =

South African actress and model

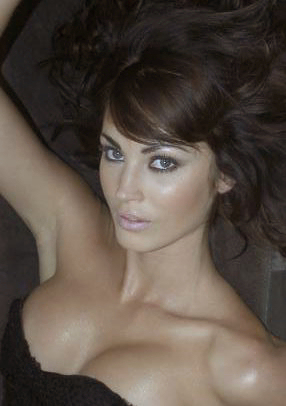
- Phoenix in 2011
- Born: Tanit Jacqueline Phoenix; 24 September 1980 (age 46); Durban, KwaZulu-Natal, South Africa
- Occupations: Model, actress, makeup artist
- Years active: 2005–2013
- Known for: Lilith (Femme Fatales)
- Height: 1.74 m (5 ft 8 1/2 in)
- Spouse(s): Sharlto Copley (m. 2016; div. 2023) Blaine Lourd (m. 2025)
- Children: 1

Tanit Phoenix (born 24 September 1980) is a South African former fashion model, actress and makeup artist. She is known for her swimwear and lingerie photo shoots after appearing in a Sports Illustrated Swimsuit Issue in 2003 and in GQ magazine and FHM in the same year.

== Early life ==
Tanit Phoenix was born in Durban, KwaZulu-Natal, and is of Dutch and Irish descent.

== Modeling career ==
Phoenix began her career in Durban, South Africa at the age of 14, after being discovered by a modelling scout in her hometown, Westville. She has appeared in international TV commercials for Adidas, Coca-Cola, Volvic water, Aqua-mineral, Visine, Schweppes, American Swiss Jewelry, Citroën C3, Nivea, Alberto VO5, Aria, Transition Lenses, Volvic, and Distractions lingerie campaign.

Phoenix appeared in the European TV ad for Fa shower gel, skydiving. She was then chosen to be a cover girl for German Maxim in 2004 after being named "Who's That Girl?" at the Woman of the Year German Maxim awards in 2003, and then appeared on the cover of American Maxim the year after. She was ranked #5 in the FHM 100 Sexiest Women in the World poll of South African FHM readers in 2004, #6 in 2005, #10 in 2006, #40 in 2007. In 2011 Phoenix won "IGN's Sexiest woman of the year". She was the most popular woman ever photographed for Babeology by IGN.

She has appeared on the cover of South African Cosmopolitan four times, South African and American FHM numerous times, Legacy, Indwe, South African Marie Claire, German and South African Shape and South African GQ magazines, and has frequently been shot for Sports Illustrated Swimsuit Issue. In May 2014 Tanit Phoenix appeared on the cover for Maxim South Africa.

== Acting career ==
Phoenix began her acting career with a brief appearance as one of Jared Leto's girlfriends in the 2005 film Lord of War, and the South African-Canadian mystery series Charlie Jade as Malachi's associate in the episode "Things Unseen". In 2007, she filmed a role in Gallowwalkers, opposite Wesley Snipes. The film was not released until it went to video in 2013. In 2008, she appeared in the thriller Kamasutra Nights (also known as Maya).

In 2010, she starred in the horror film Lost Boys: The Thirst and in the comedy Spud opposite John Cleese.

In 2011, Phoenix appeared in the TV series Femme Fatales, where she was the narrator of the show and appeared for a snippet of every episode. She also had a minor role in Safe House, and played the sexy antagonist alongside Leon Schuster in the 2012 movie Mad Buddies.

Phoenix starred in Death Race 2 and Death Race 3: Inferno alongside Luke Goss and Danny Trejo and reprised her role as Eve Wilson in Spud 2: The Madness Continues.

== Make-up artist career ==
In 2013, Phoenix took her first job as the key makeup artist and designer of the character Jimmy on the P.O.V. action film Hardcore Henry. Jimmy was played by her husband Sharlto Copley. She transformed him into 11 different characters.

== Personal life ==
Phoenix started dating actor Sharlto Copley in January 2012. On 15 February 2016, they married in Cape Town, South Africa, and announced their first child together on 1 January 2017. Sharlto filed for divorce in June 2023, after the couple had lived apart since 30 October 2021. According to her social media, Phoenix married financial advisor Blaine Lourd in October 2025.

Phoenix is a vegan.

== Filmography ==
=== Film ===
Year	Title	Role	Notes
2005	Crazy Monkey Presents Straight Outta Benoni	Megan Alba	
2005	Lord of War	Candy	
2008	Kamasutra Nights	Alexandria	Direct to Video
2010	Schuks Tshabalala's Survival Guide to South Africa	Sexy Nurse	
2010	Lost Boys: The Thirst	Gwen Lieber	Video
2010	Spud	Eve Wilson	
2010	Death Race 2	Katrina Banks	Video
2012	Safe House	Hostess	
2012	Mad Buddies	Kelsey	
2013	Death Race 3: Inferno	Katrina Banks	Video
2013	Spud 2: The Madness Continues	Eve Wilson	
2013	Gallowwalkers	Angel	Video

=== Television ===
Year	Title	Role	Notes
2005	Charlie Jade	Malachi's associate #1	Episode: "Things Unseen"
2009	The Philanthropist	Lap Dancer	Episode: "San Diego"
2011–2012	Femme Fatales	Lilith	Lead Role

=== Music video ===
Year	Title	Artist
2012	"Unholy"	Taxi Violence
