= Luke Goss =

English singer and actor (born 1968)

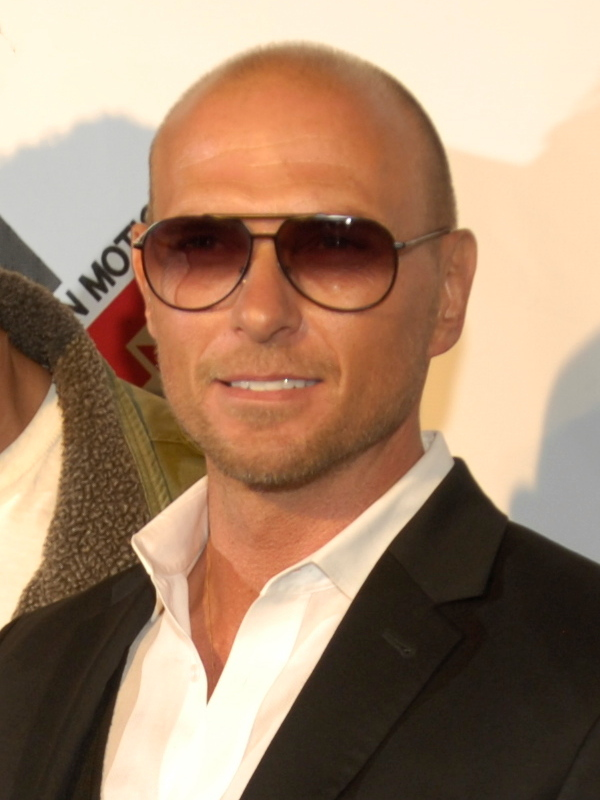
- Goss at the Blood Out premiere in 2011
- Born: Luke Damon Goss; 29 September 1968 (age 57); Lewisham, London, England
- Occupations: Actor, drummer, director, producer, author
- Years active: 1986–present
- Spouse: Shirley Lewis (m. 1994 - 2017)
- Musical career
- Instruments: Drums, percussion, keyboards, keytar, programming, bass

Luke Damon Goss (born 29 September 1968) is an English actor, and drummer of the 1980s band Bros. He has appeared in numerous films including Blade II (2002) as Jared Nomak, One Night with the King (2006) as King Xerxes, Hellboy II: The Golden Army (2008) as Prince Nuada, Tekken (2009) as Steve Fox, Interview with a Hitman (2012) as Viktor, and Traffik (2018) as Red.

== Career ==
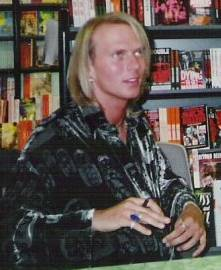
Goss pictured in 1993

Goss, along with twin brother Matt Goss, started his career with the 1980s boy band Bros. In total he has charted with thirteen hit singles in the UK.

When Bros broke up in 1992, Goss worked with the Band of Thieves where they released two singles "Sweeter Than The Midnight Rain" and "Give Me One More Chance", he then released "L.I.F.E." under the band's name change Thieves Like Us due to a change in line-up. His autobiography "I Owe You Nothing" was a top 10 best seller and went on to have three subsequent printings. He also began to appear in stage musicals including Grease and What a Feeling, and has turned to acting in films full-time, with his first most notable role being the villain, Jared Nomak, in the superhero horror film Blade II, based on the Marvel Comics character. He also appeared as The Creature in the Hallmark Channel's Frankenstein. Goss can be seen in the 2004 crime drama, Charlie in which he plays real-life gangster Charlie Richardson. In the 2005 comedy The Man, he starred as another villain, Joey/Kane, alongside Eugene Levy and Samuel L. Jackson.

He has since had roles in One Night with the King, as King Xerxes. He appeared in Bone Dry, as Eddie and in the thriller Unearthed, as Kale. Goss received a CAMIE (Character and Morality in Entertainment) Award for his work in One Night with the King on 12 May 2007 at the Beverly Hills Hotel in Los Angeles. Both One Night with the King and Bone Dry were viewed at the 2007 Cannes Film Festival. Bone Dry premiered in Los Angeles on 9 January 2008.

In the autumn of 2008, Goss returned from filming Hellboy II: The Golden Army in Budapest, Hungary, in which he plays Prince Nuada. The sequel was released in North America on 11 July 2008.

In February 2008 he signed to play the role of Steve Fox in Tekken, which was filmed in Shreveport, Louisiana. He was seen in a commercial for the new Cadillac Escalade Hybrid. In January 2010, Goss won the role as Frankenstein in Death Race 2 which was originally played by Jason Statham in the first film, under the direction from Roel Reiné, which began shooting on location in Eastern Europe in February 2010. Goss also played the lead role in Syfy's dark tale television film Witchville. In May 2010, he won the Ultimate Badass Award at the PollyGrind Film Festival for his role in the zombie-vampire film The Dead Undead. In February 2018, Goss released his directorial debut Your Move.

== Personal life ==
Goss was born in Lewisham, London, the son of Alan Goss and his wife Carol (nee Read). His twin brother is Matt Goss.

Both Goss siblings studied at Collingwood College, Surrey.

In 2020, Goss confirmed he and Shirley split in 2017 after more than two decades of marriage.

== Filmography ==
Year	Film	Role	Notes
2000	The Stretch	Warwick Locke	
2000	Two Days, Nine Lives	Saul	
2002	Blade II	Jared Nomak	
2002	ZigZag	Cadillac Tom	
2002	Nine-Tenths	Jon Laker	
2004	Frankenstein	The Creature	TV miniseries
2004	Charlie	Charlie Richardson	
2004	Silver Hawk	Alexander Wolfe	
2005	The Man	Joey / Kane	
2005	Private Moments	Lucien	
2005	Cold & Dark	John Dark	Direct-to-DVD
2006	One Night with the King	King Xerxes	
2006	Something in the Clearing	Randy	
2006	Mercenary for Justice	John Dresham	Direct-to-DVD
2006	13 Graves	Anton	
2007	Bone Dry	Eddie	Direct-to-DVD
2007	Shanghai Baby	Mark	
2007	Unearthed	Kale	
2008	Hellboy II: The Golden Army	Prince Nuada	
2008	Deep Winter	Stephen Weaks	Direct-to-DVD
2009	Fringe	Lloyd Parr / Shapeshifter	TV series
2009	Annihilation Earth	David	TV movie
2009	Tekken	Steve Fox	
2010	Witchville	Malachy	TV movie
2010	The Dead Undead	Jack	Direct-to-DVD
2010	El Dorado	Col. Sam Grissom	TV miniseries
2010	Across the Line: The Exodus of Charlie Wright	Damon	
2010	Death Race 2	Carl "Luke" Lucas / Frankenstein	Direct-to-DVD
2011	Seven Below	Issac	Direct-to-DVD
2011	Pressed	Brian Parker	Direct-to-DVD
2011	Blood Out	Michael Savion	Direct-to-DVD
2011	Inside	Miles Barrett	
2012	Interview with a Hitman	Viktor	
2013	Death Race 3: Inferno	Carl "Luke" Lucas / Frankenstein	Direct-to-DVD
2013	Red Widow	Luther	TV series
2014	Dead Drop	Michael Shaughnessy	Direct-to-DVD
2014	Lost Time	Carter	Direct-to-DVD
2015	War Pigs	Captain Jack Wosick	Direct-to-DVD
2015	AWOL72	Conrad Miller	Direct-to-DVD
2015	The Night Crew	Wade	Direct-to-DVD
2015	Operator	Jeremy Miller	Direct-to-DVD
2016	Killing Salazar	DEA Agent Tom Jensen	Direct-to-DVD
2016	Crossing Point	Decker	
2017	Mississippi Murder	Mavredes	Direct-to-DVD
2018	Your Move	David	Also director, writer, and producer
2018	Extracurricular	Alan Gordon	Direct-to-DVD
2018	Traffik	Red	
2018	Bros: After the Screaming Stops	Himself	Selected cinemas
2019	The Last Boy	Jay	Direct-to-DVD
2019	The Hard Way	Mason	Netflix
2019	Hollow Point	Hank Carmac	
2020	Legacy	Agent Gray	
2020	Paydirt	Damien Brooks	Direct-to-DVD
2020	The Loss Adjuster	Martin Dyer	
2021	R.I.A.	David	
2026	Spider-Man: Brand New Day	Frederick Foswell	
