= Shopping (1994 film) =

1994 British film by Paul Anderson

- Theatrical release poster
- Directed by: Paul Anderson
- Written by: Paul Anderson
- Produced by: Jeremy Bolt
- Starring: Sadie Frost; Jude Law; Sean Pertwee; Marianne Faithfull; Sean Bean; Jonathan Pryce
- Cinematography: Tony Imi
- Edited by: David Stiven
- Music by: Barrington Pheloung
- Production companies: Channel Four Films; Impact Pictures; Kuzui Enterprises; PolyGram Filmed Entertainment; WMG Film
- Distributed by: Rank Film Distributors
- Release dates: 24 June 1994 (United Kingdom); 9 February 1996 (United States)
- Running time: 105 minutes
- Country: United Kingdom
- Language: English
- Budget: $2 million
- Box office: <$50,000

Shopping is a 1994 British action crime drama film written and directed by Paul Anderson, in his directorial debut, about a group of British teenagers who indulge in joyriding and ramraiding. It was the first major leading role for actor Jude Law, who first met his co-star and future wife Sadie Frost on the set of the film.

== Plot summary ==
Billy is a thrill-seeking teen, who along with his friends Jo, Be Bop and Monkey - engage in stealing cars and occasional petty theft by crashing cars into shops, also known as ram-raiding. The film begins with Billy being released from jail by Police Captain Conway. Conway attempts to unsuccessfully deter Billy from doing crimes.

Billy is forced to live in a trailer as he's not welcomed home by his father. Billy's activities draw negative attention to the criminal activities of Tommy, whose gang engages in selling drugs and stolen merchandise. Eventually one of Billy's raids prevent Tommy from committing a large robbery and his gang trash Billy's trailer as revenge, forcing him to retreat to a train graveyard.

At the film's finale, Billy and company attempt to ram-raid a large department store but are ambushed by the authorities who have been tipped off by Tommy. Billy and his friends die as a result of crashing in the police ambush.

== Cast ==
- Sadie Frost – Jo
- Jude Law – Billy
- Sean Pertwee – Tommy
- Fraser James – Be Bop
- Sean Bean – Venning
- Marianne Faithfull – Bev
- Jonathan Pryce – Conway
- Daniel Newman – Monkey (as Danny Newman)
- Lee Whitlock – Pony
- Ralph Ineson – Dix
- Eamonn Walker – Peters
- Jason Isaacs – Market Trader
- Chris Constantinou – Yuppie
- Tilly Vosburgh – Taylor
- Melanie Hill – Sarah

== Soundtrack ==
- The Sabres of Paradise – Theme
- Smith & Mighty – Drowning Man
- The Disposable Heroes of Hiphoprisy – Water Pistol Man
- Senser – No Comply
- Stereo MC's – Wake Up
- Barrington Pheloung – Hunters and Hunted
- James vs The Sabres of Paradise – Honest Joe (Spaghetti Steamhammer Mix)
- Credit to the Nation – Call It What You Want
- Kaliphz – Vibe Da Joint
- Utah Saints – I still think of you
- Wool – The Witch
- Perfecto – Rise
- One Dove – Why don't you take me
- Barrington Pheloung – Billy's Theme
- Shakespears Sister – Waiting
- Barrington Pheloung – Climb Down To Crash
- Orbital – Crash and Carry (a.k.a. The Meet)
- Salt-n-Pepa – Heaven or Hell
- EMF – Don't Look Back
- Barrington Pheloung – Tread The Thin Line
- Utah Saints – Highlander (not on soundtrack album)

== Production ==
The movie was the directorial debut of Paul Anderson and the first to be produced by his production company Impact Pictures. Anderson served as both director and writer, having previously only functioned as a TV screenwriter. The movie is also the only one of Anderson's films to be shot entirely in the UK, principally around London and Essex. The Limehouse Link and Royal Victoria Docks feature prominently during the car chase scenes as well as the location of Billy's trailer. The Lake Side Shopping Centre in Essex served as the shooting location for the film's finale.

The movie was the film debut for Jude Law who had previously appeared primarily on British television. Sadie Frost, who had more experience, was hired to act against him. Sean Pertwee and Jason Isaacs were friends and school mates with producer Jeremy Bolt and were cast due to this connection. Both actors would go on to appear in several of Anderson's future films. Fraser James would reappear years later in Anderson's In the Lost Lands. Jonathan Pryce and Sean Bean were the most senior actors who already had long established careers.

Just as many of Anderson's films, the movie's soundtrack features a heavy mix of both sourced licence music as well as original pieces composed by Australian composer Barrington Pheloung. The film featured early examples of Pheloung's film work, who in the 1980s had mostly worked in British television. The soundtrack features two songs by the electronic music group Orbital, whose music Anderson would later utilise in Mortal Kombat and Event Horizon.

== Release ==
The film opened on 24 June 1994 on 26 screens in the United Kingdom and grossed £33,277 in its opening weekend.

It grossed $3,061 in the United States and Canada. Roger Corman bought the North American distribution rights and help release the movie on Home Video. Anderson would later go onto make Death Race in thanks to Corman's help.

== Reception ==
Channel 4 wrote a mixed review of Shopping, stating that Anderson was "borrowing from Blade Runner and Gotham City to build his vision of a country divided. While a lack of subtlety clouds his intentions, the director delivers a slick, diverting story that will probably be best remembered as Jude Law's first movie." Alistair Lawrence of Common Sense Media gave the film 4 out of 5 stars, describing it as a "low-budget but slick ode to self-destructive teens...", praising the action scenes and for having "a style and sense of place that so many other movies lack."
