= Resident Evil: The Final Chapter =

2016 film by Paul W. S. Anderson

- Theatrical release poster
- Directed by: Paul W. S. Anderson
- Written by: Paul W. S. Anderson
- Based on: Resident Evil by Capcom
- Produced by: Jeremy Bolt; Paul W. S. Anderson; Robert Kulzer; Samuel Hadida
- Starring: Milla Jovovich; Iain Glen; Ali Larter; Shawn Roberts; Eoin Macken; Ruby Rose; William Levy
- Cinematography: Glen MacPherson
- Edited by: Doobie White
- Music by: Paul Haslinger
- Production companies: Screen Gems; Constantin Film; Davis Films; Impact Pictures
- Distributed by: Sony Pictures Releasing (Worldwide); Constantin Film (Germany); Metropolitan Filmexport (France)
- Release dates: December 23, 2016 (Tokyo); January 25, 2017 (France); January 26, 2017 (Germany); January 27, 2017 (United States); February 3, 2017 (United Kingdom)
- Running time: 107 minutes
- Countries: Germany; United Kingdom; United States; France; Canada; Australia
- Language: English
- Budget: $40 million
- Box office: $314.1 million

Resident Evil: The Final Chapter is a 2016 action horror film written and directed by Paul W. S. Anderson. The direct sequel to Resident Evil: Retribution (2012), it is the sixth installment in the Resident Evil film series and the final installment in the original series, which is based on the video game series of the same name. The film stars Milla Jovovich, Iain Glen, Ali Larter, Shawn Roberts, Eoin Macken, Fraser James, Ruby Rose, Rola, and William Levy. In the film, Alice and her friends are betrayed by Albert Wesker, who gathers the entire forces of the Umbrella Corporation into one final strike against the apocalypse survivors.

A sixth film in the series was announced to be in development by Sony Pictures in 2013, and Anderson later expressed his desire for it to "come full circle", bringing back characters, themes and the environment of the Hive from the first film. It was filmed in 2D and post-converted to stereoscopic 3D, and principal photography commenced on September 18, 2015 in South Africa.

Resident Evil: The Final Chapter was released on December 23, 2016, in Japan and on January 27, 2017, in the United States in 2D, 3D and IMAX 3D. The film received mixed reviews from critics and became the second highest-grossing entry film in the franchise, earning over $314 million worldwide against a $40 million budget. A reboot, Resident Evil: Welcome to Raccoon City, was released November 24, 2021.

== Plot ==
Dr. James Marcus, the founder of the Umbrella Corporation, is desperate to save his daughter, Alicia, who is dying of progeria. Marcus confiscates an untested embryonic Umbrella project—the T-virus—created by his colleague Dr. Charles Ashford and uses it on Alicia and others. After a child treated with the virus becomes a zombie, Marcus immediately orders the project terminated, all data on it destroyed, and forbids Ashford from ever pursuing it again, devastating Ashford, who needed the T-virus to save his own daughter. (Note: as depicted in Resident Evil: Apocalypse) Marcus's partner, Dr. Alexander Isaacs, has Marcus murdered by Albert Wesker, adopts Alicia, and takes over Umbrella.

In the present, Alice awakens in the ruined White House following a betrayal by Wesker. (Note: as depicted in Resident Evil: Retribution) The Red Queen program appears and recruits her to infiltrate the Hive, a facility beneath Raccoon City. (Note: as seen in Resident Evil) The Umbrella Corporation possesses an airborne antivirus capable of eliminating the T-virus plague, but is waiting for the world's few remaining humans to be wiped out in 48 hours. As her body carries the virus, Alice believes she will not survive, but accepts the mission regardless.

While traveling, Alice is captured by Isaacs, learning the "Isaacs" she previously killed was a clone. (Note: as depicted in Resident Evil: Extinction) She escapes his convoy and reaches Raccoon City, where she meets a group of survivors: Doc, Abigail, Christian, Cobalt, Razor, and Claire Redfield, who survived the attack on Arcadia. (Note: as depicted in Resident Evil: Afterlife) Doc and Claire are in a relationship. Isaacs' convoy approaches, trailed by a horde of zombies. Alice and the group defeat them and retrieve Isaacs' few human captives, but Cobalt dies in the process. Alice and the crew enter the Hive, which Wesker controls from a central hub. He releases mutated guard dogs, killing Christian and a freed captive.

The Red Queen appears to Alice and explains that her program is in conflict, as she cannot hurt an Umbrella employee but also must value human life. She plays a video of Isaacs presenting a plan to release the T-virus, cleansing the Earth of humanity and leaving the rich and powerful—including Umbrella executives, cryogenically frozen and kept safe in the Hive—to rebuild the world. Only one voice on the Umbrella board dissents: an old woman. The Red Queen explains that she is using Alice as an agent to act against Umbrella, and warns of a traitor in the group. Abigail and Razor are killed by traps.

Alice and Doc plant bombs taken from the first infiltration team's leftover equipment (Note: as depicted in Resident Evil) and confront the real, tech-upgraded Isaacs. Doc is unmasked as Umbrella's spy, and Claire is captured by Wesker. A cryogenic capsule releases an aged Alicia Marcus, Umbrella's co-owner and Marcus' daughter, who disagreed with Wesker's plan but was outvoted. Isaacs reveals that Alice is actually a clone of Alicia; he plans to eliminate the pair and assume total control of Umbrella. Alicia fires Wesker, allowing the Red Queen to terminate his protection program and crush his leg with a security door. Doc unsuccessfully tries to shoot Alice; Claire kills him. After giving the critically-wounded Wesker a deadman's switch to the primed bombs, Alice and Claire pursue Isaacs while Alicia uploads her childhood memories into the Red Queen's mainframe.

Isaacs overpowers Alice and Claire at first, but Alice activates a grenade in his pocket, killing him. She escapes to the surface with the anti-virus, but Isaacs revives and catches her before she can release it. Before he can kill her, the Isaacs clone from the convoy arrives and murders him, believing himself to be the original Isaacs, before being devoured by the undead. Alice releases the anti-virus, killing all of the zombies around her before she passes out. Wesker simultaneously drops the deadman's switch, destroying himself, Alicia, the Hive, and the hibernating elite.

Claire wakes Alice, who survived because the anti-virus only killed the T-virus within her body, not the healthy cells. The Red Queen, itself based on a young Alicia, uploads Alicia's childhood memories into Alice, granting her a childhood and a full sense of self-identity. With the anti-virus being airborne, it will take years to spread over the entire planet. Until it does, Alice vows to continue her mission of eliminating the undead.

== Cast ==
- Milla Jovovich as Alice, a former Umbrella security officer-turned-resistance fighter
  - Jovovich also plays the role of the older Alicia Marcus, daughter of the creator of the T-virus, co-owner (from her father's share) of the Umbrella Corporation and the source from whom the Alices were cloned.
- Iain Glen as Dr. Isaacs, the technologically enhanced CEO of the Umbrella Corporation
- Ali Larter as Claire Redfield, one of Alice's allies
- Shawn Roberts as Albert Wesker, the former chairman of Umbrella
- Eoin Macken as Doc, a spy working for Umbrella
- Fraser James as Razor, a survivor who aids Alice and the others into the Hive
- Ruby Rose as Abigail, an inmate survivor who also joins Alice's attack into the Hive
- William Levy as Christian, the leading survivor who led the assault on Umbrella
- Rola as Cobalt, a survivor who joins the assault on Umbrella
- Ever Anderson as Red Queen, the artificial intelligence created by Umbrella
  - Anderson also plays the young Alicia Marcus and is the real-life daughter of Jovovich and Paul W. S. Anderson
- Mark Simpson as Dr. James Marcus
- Lee Joon-gi as Commander Chu, Umbrella's security chief and second-in-command

== Production ==
=== Development ===
In September 2012, following the box office success of Resident Evil: Retribution, a sixth film in the Resident Evil film series was confirmed by the head of Sony Pictures distribution, Rory Bruer, with Milla Jovovich attached to reprise the role of Alice. In October 2012, in an interview with Forbes, producer Samuel Hadida stated that a sixth and seventh installment were being planned and a reboot of the series was possible. In December 2012, director Paul W. S. Anderson confirmed that he would be directing "Resident Evil 6". He stated that it would be the last film in the series and some characters from the first two films would return. In June 2013, Jovovich tweeted that the sixth film, which had been scheduled for a September 12, 2014, release, would not be released before 2015. The film was scheduled to start shooting in late 2013 as soon as Anderson had finished work on his disaster/romance film Pompeii.

In February 2014, Anderson told Collider that "we'd like to do another Resident Evil movie. Definitely. But the wheels aren't quite in motion yet,"; the film was reportedly planned to be released in 2015. In April 2014, while speaking at the Beijing International Film Festival, Anderson revealed that he would soon be writing the screenplay for the sixth film in the series. He also confirmed that the film would be in 3D and that actress Li Bingbing would be returning to play Ada Wong. In June 2014, Anderson announced the film's working title to be "Resident Evil: The Final Chapter" and confirmed that it was intended to be the final film in the series. He also revealed that half the script had been completed, but, as yet, there were no shooting or release schedules. Filming was set to begin in South Africa in August 2014 but was delayed for a year because of Jovovich's pregnancy.

On July 15, 2015, Jovovich posted a photo on Instagram announcing that shooting was about to start in South Africa. Several actors from previous films, including Sienna Guillory (Jill Valentine), Li Bingbing (Ada Wong), Aryana Engineer (Becky), Spencer Locke (K-Mart), Michelle Rodriguez (Rain Ocampo), Wentworth Miller (Chris Redfield), and Johann Urb (Leon S. Kennedy) were not cast to return for the last movie. On August 3, 2015, it was confirmed that Ali Larter would be back for the sequel in the role of Claire Redfield, and filming would begin in late August or early September. Larter confirmed the sixth film would be the last in the franchise. On September 18, 2015, other cast members were announced including Iain Glen as Dr. Alexander Isaacs, Shawn Roberts as Albert Wesker, Ruby Rose as Abigail, Eoin Macken as Doc, William Levy as Christian, Fraser James as Michael, and Rola as Cobalt. On October 19, 2015, Lee Joon-gi joined the film to play Commander Lee of the Umbrella Corporation.

=== Filming ===
Principal photography on the film began on September 18, 2015, in Cape Town / Hartbeespoort Dam, South Africa. Further filming took place in Queensland, Australia at Village Roadshow studios in the Gold Coast as well as Brisbane and Magnetic Island. Filming ended on December 9, 2015.

Resident Evil: The Final Chapter was fully shot with 2D cameras and post-converted to 3D by Legend3D. It is the first film in the series to have a 3D post-conversion, as the previous two installments were shot natively in 3D. According to Anderson, the mobility of the smaller 2D cameras and the knowledgeability of the crew, who were well versed in shooting 3D, made for the best of both formats.

==== Stuntwoman injury and crew fatality ====
During filming, Jovovich's stunt double, South African stunt-woman Olivia Jackson, was severely injured on September 5, 2015 when her motorcycle collided with a camera crane. She had been riding at high speed without a helmet, and the camera crane had failed to move out of the way in time. According to the production company the crane had malfunctioned.

Jackson was in a medically induced coma for two weeks. Among her injuries were cerebral trauma, a crushed face, a severed artery in her neck, a paralyzed arm, several broken ribs, a shattered scapula, a broken clavicle, torn fingers with a thumb that needed to be amputated, and five nerves torn out of her spinal cord. She announced in December 2015 that her paralyzed left arm would need to be amputated.

In 2019 Jackson sued the producers for "elevating financial considerations over safety." She and the crane operator both claimed in her lawsuit that director Anderson had changed his mind about the angle of the filming, and gave the crane operator the order to raise the camera one second later than he had done in the two rehearsals immediately before. She also said that she was misled to believe there was insurance covering injuries, when there was only minor insurance not even covering medical care, so had she had known she would not have accepted the job. Jackson won the lawsuit.

A second accident occurred during filming on December 3 when crew member Ricardo Cornelius was crushed to death by one of the film's props, a US Army-issue Hummer, while on set.

== Release ==
=== Theatrical ===
Sony first scheduled the film for release on September 12, 2014, before delaying it over two years. It was released in Japan on December 23, 2016, and in North America on January 27, 2017, by Screen Gems.

Japanese rock band L'Arc-en-Ciel created the song "Don't Be Afraid" specifically for the Japanese theatrical release.

=== Home media ===
Resident Evil: The Final Chapter was released to DVD and Blu-ray on May 16, 2017, in the United States.

== Reception ==
=== Box office ===
Resident Evil: The Final Chapter grossed $26.8 million in the United States and Canada and $287.3 million in other territories for a worldwide total of $314.1 million, against a production budget of $40 million. In North America, it was released alongside A Dog's Purpose and Gold, and was projected to gross around $13 million from 3,050 theaters in its opening weekend. It made $1 million from Thursday night previews and $5.1 million on its first day. It ended up opening to $13.9 million, the lowest-grossing debut of the franchise, and finished 4th at the box office.

In China, the film was trimmed by 7 minutes by the violence-intolerant State Administration of Press, Publication, Radio, Film and Television, and opened on February 24, 2017 across 11,000 screens, earning $30 million on its first day. Through its opening weekend, the film made 636.9 million yuan ($92.7 million). This marked the biggest Friday-through-Sunday debut ever for an imported film, topping Transformers: Age of Extinction (632 million yuan) and Captain America: Civil War (628 million yuan), and the second biggest for all films, behind Lost in Thailand. However, figures varied slightly by different outlets—Shanghai-based cinema consulting firm Artisan Gateway had its opening weekend at $93.9 million while the film's studio, Sony Pictures, came in higher with $94.3 million. Mainland China was the movie's highest-grossing foreign market, contributing $160 million from the box office.

=== Critical response ===
Resident Evil: The Final Chapter received mixed reviews from critics. On Rotten Tomatoes, the film has an approval rating of 38% based on 102 reviews, and a positive rating of 4.50/10. The website's critical consensus reads, "Resident Evil: The Final Chapter may prove mind-numbingly chaotic for the unconverted, but for fans of the venerable franchise, it offers a fittingly kinetic conclusion to its violent post-apocalyptic saga." On Metacritic the film has a weighted average score 49 out of 100, based on 19 critics, indicating "mixed or average reviews". Audiences polled by CinemaScore gave the film an average grade of "B" on an A+ to F scale.

Alex Welch of IGN was critical of the film, giving 3/10 and calling it "a pointless mess from beginning to end", and "nothing more than a barrage of clichéd character beats, unbearable CGI action, and headache-inducing editing". Glenn Kenny for The New York Times wrote, "This is, I think, the weakest picture in the franchise".

The decision not to bring back surviving characters from the previous films—notably Jill, Leon and Ada—was a particular draw for criticism, with many voicing disappointment over a lack of closure for said characters and a sense of anti-climax following the cliff-hanger ending of the previous movie that had implied their inclusion in a follow-up.

Bill Zwecker of Chicago Sun-Times gave the film three stars out of four, saying it "[gets] the storyline right off the bat". He added, "For fans of Resident Evil, I believe this final film will not disappoint, but it also will likely encourage newcomers to the saga to go back and play a bit of catch-up by watching the earlier movies". Peter Bradshaw of The Guardian thought "Jovovich and Glen do their best with what they're given, and the digital rendering of that wrecked vista of Washington DC is impressive, but in dramatic terms it's as perfunctorily presented as everything else. Another deafening, boring episode."

Rotten Tomatoes lists the film on its 100 Best Zombie Movies, Ranked by Tomatometer.

=== Accolades ===
List of Awards
Award	Category	Recipients	Result
Golden Trailer Awards	Golden Fleece	Resident Evil: The Final Chapter: "Last Humanity"	Won
Golden Trailer Awards	Best Teaser TV Spot (for a Feature Film)	Resident Evil: The Final Chapter	Nominated
Golden Trailer Awards	Best Viral Campaign	Resident Evil: The Final Chapter	Nominated

== Reboot ==
In May 2017, Martin Moszkowicz announced a reboot in development, to be produced by James Wan with a script by Greg Russo. In December 2018, Wan and Russo left the project, and Johannes Roberts was hired as writer and director. In October 2020, Deadline reported that several characters had been cast for the movie, and that it would be an origin story set in 1998. The film was released on November 24, 2021.

== See also ==
- List of films based on video games
