= The Sight (film) =

- DVD cover
- Genre: Horror; Thriller
- Written by: Paul W. S. Anderson
- Directed by: Paul W. S. Anderson
- Starring: Andrew McCarthy; Kevin Tighe; Amanda Redman; Jessica Oyelowo
- Music by: Jocelyn Pook
- Countries of origin: United States; United Kingdom
- Original language: English

Production
- Executive producers: Paul W. S. Anderson; Jeremy Bolt; Julia Webb
- Producer: Chris Symes
- Cinematography: David Johnson
- Editor: David Gamble
- Running time: 96 minutes
- Production companies: 20th Century Fox Television; Impact Pictures

Original release
- Network: FX
- Release: October 29, 2000

The Sight is a 2000 horror television film starring Andrew McCarthy. It was written and directed by Paul W. S. Anderson, and aired on FX in the United States on October 29, 2000.

== Premise ==
Michael Lewis (Andrew McCarthy) is an American architect who is sent to Britain to refurbish an old London hotel, where he soon begins to have strange visions and frightening dreams.

== Cast ==
- Andrew McCarthy as Michael Lewis
- Kevin Tighe as Jake
- Amanda Redman as Detective Pryce
- Jessica Oyelowo as Isobel
- Michaela Dicker as Alice

== Production ==
The film was written and directed by Paul W. S. Anderson as a pilot for an unsold weekly TV series. It was almost entirely filmed in London. The film is the first in which Anderson is credited with his middle initials, as he had recently joined the Writers Guild of America, to differentiate himself from Paul Thomas Anderson.

Anderson would recycle several ideas, including the connection Alice's Adventures in Wonderland, to his next film Resident Evil. Michaela Dicker, who appears as the ghost girl Alice, played the Red Queen in Resident Evil. Frequent collaborator Jason Isaacs appears as a cameo during the film's ending.

== Reception ==
Kevin Lyons from the website "The EOFFTV Review" gave the film a mixed review writing: "It's not a great film by any stretch of the imagination but it's a more restrained and thoughtful work than the brain-dead action films that Anderson was about to make his own". Lyons concluded: "It's not the greatest ghost story ever made but it had potential and the final images suggest that the subsequent series was about to take off in more interesting directions.
