= Paul W. S. Anderson =

English filmmaker (born 1965)

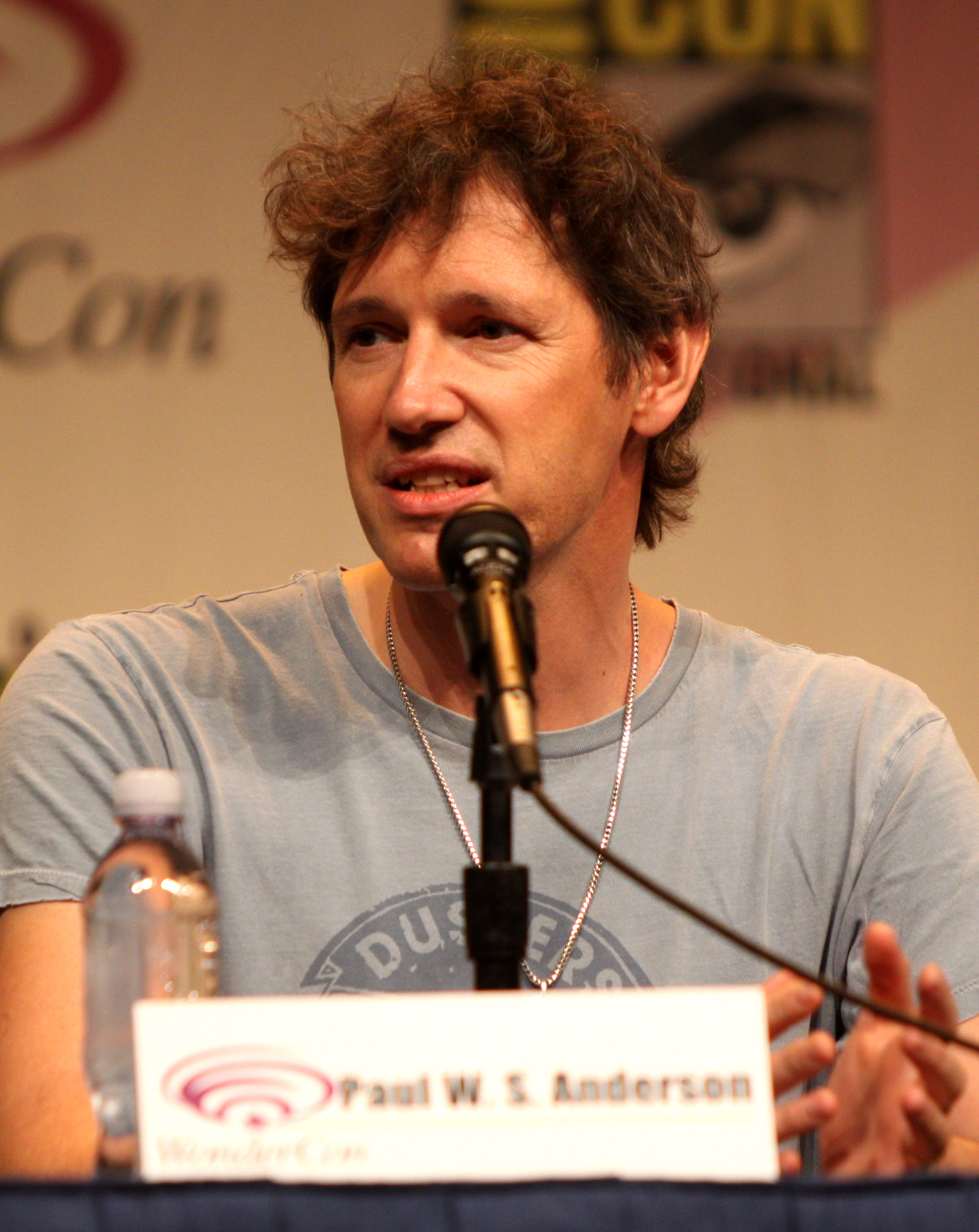
- Anderson in 2012
- Born: Paul William Scott Anderson; 4 March 1965 (age 61); Wallsend, England
- Occupations: Director; screenwriter; producer
- Years active: 1990–present
- Spouse: Milla Jovovich (m. 2009)
- Children: 3, including Ever

Paul William Scott Anderson (born 4 March 1965) is an English filmmaker who is best known for his science fiction films and video game adaptations. Anderson made his feature-length directorial debut with the independent film Shopping (1994). In 1992, he and producer Jeremy Bolt co-founded Impact Pictures, under which most of his films have been produced. He found commercial success with his second film, Mortal Kombat (1995), based on the namesake video games. He came to wider attention for his work on the first, fourth, fifth and sixth films of the Resident Evil series (2002–2016), based on the video games of the same name; his entries collectively grossed over $1 billion worldwide.

Anderson's other films include Event Horizon (1997), Alien vs. Predator (2004), Death Race (2008), and Pompeii (2014). Event Horizon was initially a critical and commercial failure, but has since been reassessed as an influential cult classic and often appears on lists of the best horror films of all time.

== Early life ==
Paul William Scott Anderson was born in Wallsend, England on 4 March 1965. At the age of nine, he began making films with a Super 8 film camera. After attending the Royal Grammar School in Newcastle upon Tyne, he became the youngest person ever to graduate from the University of Warwick with a BA in film and literature.

== Career ==
=== Early work ===
Anderson began his professional career as a writer on the British crime drama comedy series El C.I.D., which ran for three series from 1990 to 1992. He met producer Jeremy Bolt and they co-founded Impact Pictures in 1992, looking to raise money for Anderson's feature film debut as a director, from an action crime drama script of his own called Shopping. After much trouble securing funding, Shopping was released in the United Kingdom in 1994. The censors of the BBFC were not happy with the film's violence and delayed its release for months. When it was eventually released, critics panned it and some cinemas banned it for promoting an "irresponsible" outlook. In the United States, it received only an edited, direct-to-video release two years later.

Anderson credits Shopping for inspiring Channel Four Films, who had financed it, to also finance Danny Boyle's more successful Shallow Grave and Trainspotting, which he believes made critics in turn reassess his film in a more positive light in later years as one of the first in a new wave of British films concerning its youth. Shopping is Anderson's only British film, as he grew up watching American and mainland European movies, never imagining himself a British filmmaker. When Shopping was accepted into the Sundance Film Festival, American studios noticed its impressive look and style despite its relatively small $2 million budget, which led to opportunities in Hollywood for Anderson.

=== Mortal Kombat and commercial success ===
Anderson directed the fantasy martial arts video game adaptation Mortal Kombat in 1995. Using a script written by Kevin Droney, the film was based on the first entry in the video game franchise by Midway Games, Mortal Kombat, although elements and characters were borrowed from the original game's sequel, Mortal Kombat II. The film featured an ensemble cast, including Robin Shou as Liu Kang and Christopher Lambert as Raiden. Anderson became interested in the project because he often played the game at arcades. The production company decided to hire him based on the accomplished visual flair of Shopping, which was filmed on a very low budget. Anderson, who at the time knew nothing about visual effects or fight scenes, had to study every book on visual effects that he could find and learned about filming the fight scenes while they were being shot, often consulting those who were experienced in fight choreography on set, such as Shou.

The film had extensive reshoots in order to add additional fights based on feedback from test screenings, which were attended by fans of the video game franchise. The production company decided to release Mortal Kombat in August 1995, in the hope that the film would become a summer blockbuster. Mortal Kombat was better received by critics, who gave it a mixed to negative reception. Critics praised the atmosphere, visuals, and fighting sequences but criticised the plot, dialogue, and acting. It fared better with audiences and fans of the video games and scored a high A− on a CinemaScore poll. As a result, it spent three weeks as the highest-grossing film at the US box office and earned over $122 million worldwide, produced on a budget of $18 million. It proved a major success for Anderson and has been recognised as one of the first financially successful film adaptations of a video game. Anderson and most cast members, including Lambert, declined to return for the sequel, Mortal Kombat Annihilation, which, when released, was critically panned and underperformed at the box office.

=== Event Horizon, Soldier, and The Sight ===
The success of Mortal Kombat gave Anderson free rein to choose his next project, the science fiction action film Soldier, written by Blade Runner screenwriter David Peoples. Peoples' script—and eventually the film itself—contains references to his work on Blade Runner and can be considered to be taking place in the same universe, as a sidequel or standalone sequel of sorts. Kurt Russell became attached to star but decided to take some time off to build up his body, as required by the role, which delayed the production.

In the meantime, Anderson directed the 1997 science fiction horror film Event Horizon, written by Philip Eisner and starring Laurence Fishburne and Sam Neill. Despite praise for its visuals and production design, it was not well received by critics or audiences (D+ on a Cinemascore poll), and failed to break even, which Anderson blamed on a tight post-production schedule and studio-enforced cuts. It later sold well on home video and gained a small cult following. Plans to complete a director's cut featuring the deleted scenes were abandoned when it was discovered that most of it had been lost or degraded, having been stored—much to Anderson's confusion—in a salt mine in Transylvania. In the years since its release, it has been reassessed as a cult classic that influenced many horror and sci-fi films and video games, and often appears on lists of the best horror films of all time.

Soldier was eventually completed and released in 1998 but was a critical and commercial disaster, making less than $15 million in the US, on a budget of $60 million, and releasing straight-to-video in several other markets. Anderson has expressed his regret that the planned location shoots had to be changed to studio soundstages due to the El Niño hurricane, which ended up compromising the film's look. He also verbalised his disappointment with Warner Bros., whom he believes tried to market the film to the same male teen audience as Mortal Kombat, rather than to grown-up audiences, including women.

After his last two films' poor performances, Anderson was forced to put his planned remake of the cult film Death Race 2000 on hold, and he set about writing and directing the 2000 supernatural mystery drama TV film The Sight, starring Andrew McCarthy. It was meant as a pilot for a potential series, but despite achieving high ratings, it was not picked up. Anderson made his earlier films as "Paul Anderson", the name he registered with the Directors Guild of America, but with The Sight, he began crediting himself as "Paul W. S. Anderson", as filmmaker Paul Thomas Anderson had registered himself with the Writers Guild of America as "Paul Anderson", making it impossible for either of them to both write and direct films as "Paul Anderson".

=== Resident Evil, Alien vs. Predator, and Death Race ===
Anderson returned to cinema screens in 2002 with Resident Evil, a science fiction action horror film loosely based on the Capcom video game series of the same name. Anderson came up with the idea of adapting the games after playing the first couple of them for days in his apartment. Because Constantin Film, who had acquired the rights to the series, were not willing to spend more money than they already had on failed attempts (including a script by George A. Romero), Anderson convinced them to write the script, titled The Undead, on spec. If they liked it, he would sell it to them as a Resident Evil film; if not, he would take it elsewhere and try to make it unrelated to the games. He saw the film as being a prequel of sorts to the first game in the series and, as such, did not include any of the games' characters, a fact criticised by fans. Instead, it stars Milla Jovovich as an original character, Alice. Jovovich is the only actor that reprised her role in all of the series' first six live-action films. In comparison to Anderson's previous two films, Resident Evil was produced on a moderate budget of $33 million and became a commercial success with a little over $100 million at the box office.

It also performed strongly on home media. Critically, Resident Evil was not received well, although, similarly to Mortal Kombat, some reviews characterised it as one of the better attempts at adapting a video game. It received the "fair" rating of B by audiences on a Cinemascore poll. Its relative popularity made Capcom put homages to it in video games Resident Evil 4 and Resident Evil: The Umbrella Chronicles. Anderson did not direct, but he wrote, produced, and was otherwise heavily involved with the making of two sequels, Resident Evil: Apocalypse (2004) and Resident Evil: Extinction (2007), which completed the first of the eventual two trilogies of Resident Evil films. In the two sequels, Anderson began to introduce characters from the games, albeit in supporting roles compared to Alice. Both films received similarly negative reviews to the first but were even bigger commercial successes.

Anderson's next project was Alien vs. Predator, based on the crossover concept of the same name of the Alien and Predator franchises, popularised by a series of Dark Horse comics and hinted at in Predator 2. A film version had been stuck in development hell for several years, despite the franchise's crossing into every other form of media, from books to comics to video games. Anderson directed the film from a script of his own, and it was released in 2004. It received negative reviews and a B on a Cinemascore poll by audiences. It was a big commercial success, however, grossing somewhat over $170 million on a $60 million budget. A sequel was made, Aliens vs. Predator: Requiem, in which Anderson was not involved, and which failed to match Anderson's film's commercial or even critical performance, a fact that Anderson has used to defend his film.

After completing Alien vs. Predator, Anderson resumed work on his planned remake of Death Race 2000, which was released as Death Race in 2008. The science fiction action thriller stars Jason Statham, and Anderson directed it based on his own screenplay. He refers to it as more of a prequel than a remake on the commentary of the home video releases. It received an average reception by critics and scored a solid B+ on a Cinemascore poll. It grossed little over $75 million on a budget of $45 million, failing to prove a commercial success on the level of Anderson's previous two films. Anderson wrote and produced two straight-to-video prequels, Death Race 2 (2011) and Death Race 3: Inferno (2013), set before the events of the 2008 film. He later wrote and executive-produced Death Race: Beyond Anarchy (2018), a sequel to the first film.

The Resident Evil productions were criticised for unsafe filming and using shell companies to avoid liability. During the filming of Resident Evil: The Final Chapter (2016), crew member Ricardo Cornelius died when he was caught beneath a Humvee sliding off of a rotating platform. Stunt-woman Olivia Jackson lost most of an arm and was partially paralysed when she collided with a camera crane during the filming of a motorcycle stunt in rain and freezing conditions. It was determined that she was wearing inadequate safety equipment and that the stunt's timing had been changed without her knowledge. During the filming of Resident Evil: Retribution (2012), twelve extras were hospitalised with leg, neck, and back wounds after falling from a collapsing high-wheeled platform.

=== Resident Evil, The Three Musketeers, and Pompeii ===
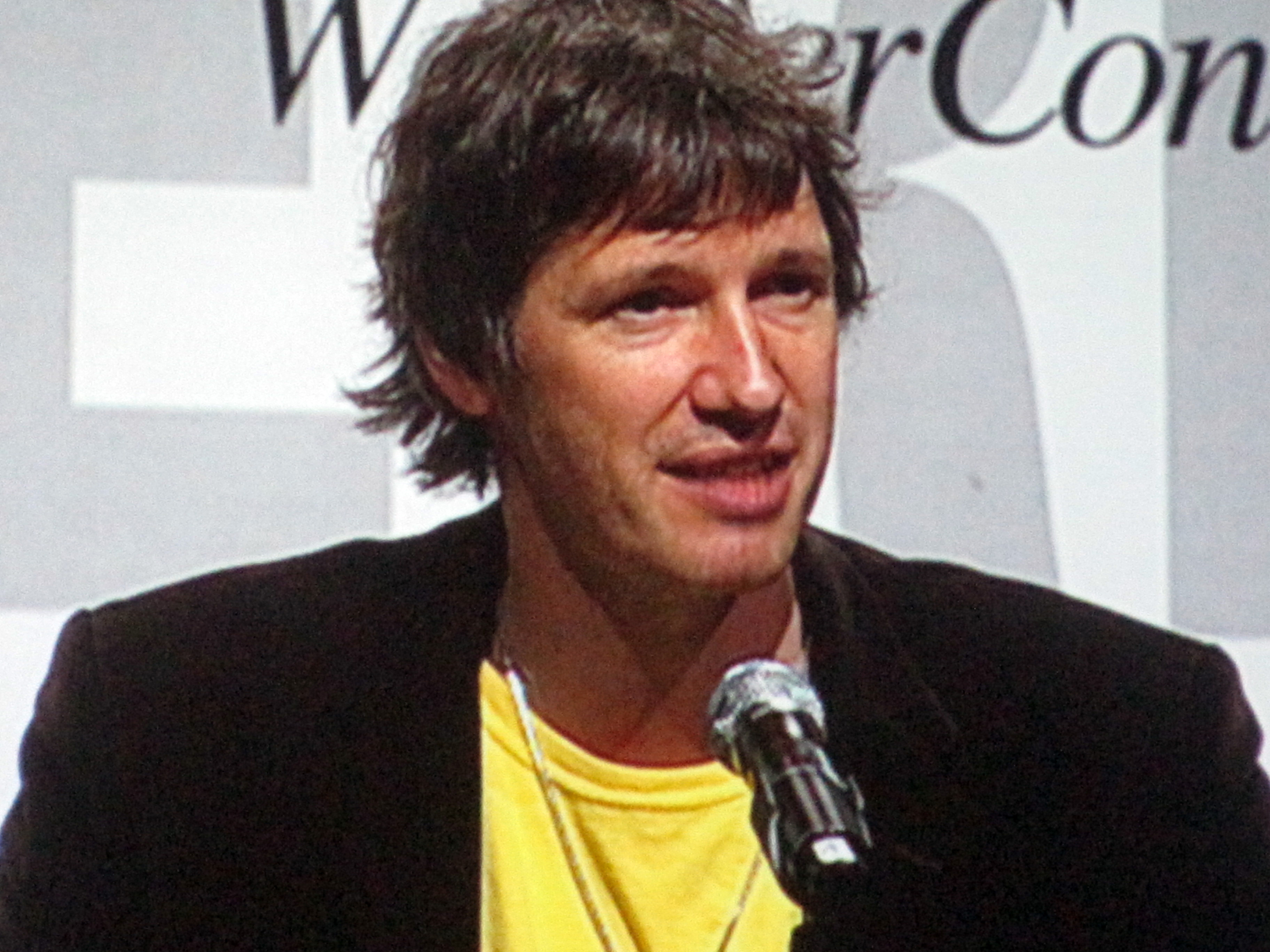
Anderson in 2010

In 2010, Anderson wrote and directed the first instalment in a second trilogy of Resident Evil films, titled Resident Evil: Afterlife. The film continues the storyline from where the last trilogy ended. Anderson envisioned the new trilogy as a way to make use of a new stylistic approach, using slow motion and 3D. Anderson filmed in native 3D, using the Sony F35 camera, mounted on the Fusion Camera System, which was previously used in Avatar. Despite negative reviews by critics and a lukewarm B in a Cinemascore poll by audiences, the film grossed $300 million on a budget of $60 million, making over $150 million than the previously most successful film in the franchise, Resident Evil: Extinction.

Anderson's next film was the 2011 3D romantic action adventure film The Three Musketeers, from a screenplay by Andrew Davies and Alex Litvak based on the novel of the same name. Matthew Macfadyen, Ray Stevenson, Luke Evans and Logan Lerman, respectively, star as the characters from the novel Athos, Porthos, Aramis, and d'Artagnan, while Milla Jovovich plays Milady de Winter. Furthermore, Christoph Waltz stars as Cardinal Richelieu, Orlando Bloom plays the Duke of Buckingham and Mads Mikkelsen appears as Captain Rochefort. The film failed to impress critics who reviewed it negatively and scored a B on a Cinemascore poll. Commercially it did not perform very well, grossing around $132–140 million on a reported budget that ranges between $75 and 90 million.

Anderson wrote and directed the fifth instalment in the Resident Evil film franchise, Resident Evil: Retribution, in 2012. Anderson brought back several actors from the original trilogy of films to play alternate versions of their characters. The film received generally negative reviews and a C+ on a Cinemascore poll, the series' lowest. Produced with a budget of $65 million, it grossed $240 million on the box office which is $60 million lower than the previous film's gross, but still overall larger than the grosses of each films of the original trilogy.

In 2014, his 3D historical disaster romance film named Pompeii was released. Inspired by the eruption of Mount Vesuvius in 79 which destroyed Pompeii, a city of the Roman Empire, the film was written by Janet Scott Batchler, Lee Batchler, and Michael Robert Johnson; it stars Kit Harington, Emily Browning, Carrie-Anne Moss, Adewale Akinnuoye-Agbaje, Jessica Lucas, with Jared Harris, and Kiefer Sutherland. The movie received generally mixed to negative reviews from critics and was rated a B in a Cinemascore poll. Pompeii was a modest box office success, grossing $108–118 million on a reported budget between $80 and 100 million.

In late 2016 in Japan, and early 2017 in the rest of the world, Anderson's Resident Evil: The Final Chapter was released, which according to both him and Jovovich is the last Resident Evil film they will be involved with. Anderson designed the film "to come full circle", provide answers to some of the series' mysteries, and provide closure for the character of Alice. He decided to abandon the previous two films' stylistic approach of using slow motion in favour of a more fast and gritty feeling, and he also decided to convert the film in 3D in post, instead of filming with 3D cameras. His first daughter with Jovovich, Ever Gabo Anderson, was cast in a double role, as both a young version of Alice and the character of Red Queen introduced in the original film. The film received average to negative reviews, slightly better than the previous instalments, and more along the lines of the original film. It was rated B by audiences on a Cinemascore poll, which is the highest rating in the series, and shared with the first and second films. The film grossed $312 million on a budget of $40 million, in large part due to a record $94.3 million opening in China, making it Anderson's highest-grossing film.

=== Monster Hunter and In the Lost Lands ===
In December 2020, Anderson directed Monster Hunter, based on Capcom's Monster Hunter video-game franchise. It was released in December 2020 after delays relating to the COVID-19 pandemic, leading to a disappointing gross of $43 million against a $60 million budget; and received mixed reviews.

In February 2025, he directed In the Lost Lands, based on George R. R. Martin's short story of the same name.

=== Future ===
Anderson is set to write and direct an upcoming film adaptation of The House of the Dead video game, specifically its third canonical instalment. The film is set to begin production mid-to-late-2025. In March 2025, Anderson stated that the screenplay was almost done and that it would shoot in the fourth quarter of the year.

== Cancelled projects ==
Peter V. Brett's fantasy novel The Warded Man was optioned for film production by Anderson and longtime producing partner Jeremy Bolt, but a 2016 update of Brett's website said that they were no longer involved in the project.

== Personal life ==
Anderson with his wife Milla Jovovich in 2009

Anderson began dating American actress Milla Jovovich, daughter of actress Galina Loginova, after the release of their film Resident Evil in 2002. He proposed to her in 2003, and they were "engaged on-and-off for four years" before becoming a couple again in early 2007. They were married on 22 August 2009. They have three daughters together: actress Ever (born 3 November 2007), Dashiel (born April 2015), and Osian (born February 2020). Jovovich suffered a miscarriage in 2018.

== Filmography ==
=== Film ===
| Year | Title | Director | Writer | Producer |
|---|---|---|---|---|
| 1994 | Shopping | Yes | Yes | No |
| 1995 | Mortal Kombat | Yes | No | No |
| 1997 | Event Horizon | Yes | No | No |
| 1998 | Soldier | Yes | No | No |
| 2002 | Resident Evil | Yes | Yes | Yes |
| 2004 | Alien vs. Predator | Yes | Yes | No |
| 2004 | Resident Evil: Apocalypse | No | Yes | Yes |
| 2005 | The Dark | No | No | Yes |
| 2006 | DOA: Dead or Alive | No | No | Yes |
| 2007 | Resident Evil: Extinction | No | Yes | Yes |
| 2008 | Death Race | Yes | Yes | Yes |
| 2009 | Pandorum | No | No | Yes |
| 2010 | Resident Evil: Afterlife | Yes | Yes | Yes |
| 2011 | The Three Musketeers | Yes | No | Yes |
| 2012 | Resident Evil: Retribution | Yes | Yes | Yes |
| 2014 | Pompeii | Yes | No | Yes |
| 2016 | Resident Evil: The Final Chapter | Yes | Yes | Yes |
| 2020 | Monster Hunter | Yes | Yes | Yes |
| 2025 | In the Lost Lands | Yes | Story | Yes |
| 2025 | Protector | No | No | Yes |

Executive producer

- Here Are the Young Men (2020)
- Resident Evil: Welcome to Raccoon City (2021)

Direct-to-video

| Year | Title | Story | Producer |
|---|---|---|---|
| 2010 | Death Race 2 | Yes | Yes |
| 2013 | Death Race 3: Inferno | Yes | Yes |
| 2018 | Death Race: Beyond Anarchy | Yes | No |

=== Television ===
| Year | Title | Director | Executive Producer | Writer | Notes |
|---|---|---|---|---|---|
| 1990–1992 | El C.I.D. | No | No | Yes | 5 episodes |
| 2000 | The Sight | Yes | Yes | Yes | TV movie |
| 2006 | Drift | Yes | Yes | No | Unsold pilot |
| 2018 | Origin | Yes | Yes | No | 3 episodes |

Commercial

- Doom 3 "Warnings" (2005).
- Volkswagen "Bus," "Chase," "Explosion" (2014).

== Reception ==
Critical reception to Anderson's films has largely been negative. However, Quentin Tarantino named Anderson's The Three Musketeers as one of his favourite films of 2011, and Variety named Event Horizon as the 94th best horror film of all time. While Mortal Kombat and some of the Resident Evil films commonly feature on lists about the best film adaptations of video games, such lists also mention that video game adaptations are usually lackluster at best. Anderson has repeatedly said that he considers himself to be a "populist filmmaker" who cares only about whether his work entertains the audience rather than the opinions of professional critics.

Reception of Paul W. S. Anderson films
| Title | Rotten Tomatoes | Metacritic | Cinemascore | Budget | Box office |
|---|---|---|---|---|---|
| Shopping | —N/a | —N/a | —N/a | $2 million | — |
| Mortal Kombat | 47% | 60/100 | A– | $18 million | $122.2 million |
| Event Horizon | 35% | 35/100 | D+ | $60 million | $26.7 million (US only) |
| Soldier | 17% | —N/a | B+ | $60 – 75 million | $14.6 million (US only) |
| Resident Evil | 36% | 35/100 | B | $33 – 35 million | $103.0 million |
| Alien vs. Predator | 21% | 29/100 | B | $60 – 70 million | $172.5 million |
| Death Race | 41% | 43/100 | B+ | $45 – 65 million | $75.7 million |
| Resident Evil: Afterlife | 21% | 37/100 | B– | $57.5 – 60 million | $300.2 million |
| The Three Musketeers | 26% | 35/100 | B | $75 – 90 million | $132.3 million |
| Resident Evil: Retribution | 28% | 39/100 | C+ | $65 million | $240.0 million |
| Pompeii | 27% | 41/100 | B | $80 – 100 million | $117.8 million |
| Resident Evil: The Final Chapter | 38% | 49/100 | B | $40 million | $306.9 million |
| Monster Hunter | 44% | 47/100 | —N/a | $60 million | $19.8 million |
| In the Lost Lands | 22% | 41/100 | —N/a | $55 million | $3 million |
| Average | 31% | 41/100 | B | —N/a | $125.75 million |
