= Pandorum =

2009 film by Christian Alvart

- Theatrical release poster
- Directed by: Christian Alvart
- Screenplay by: Travis Milloy
- Story by: Travis Milloy; Christian Alvart
- Produced by: Robert Kulzer; Jeremy Bolt; Paul W. S. Anderson
- Starring: Dennis Quaid; Ben Foster; Cam Gigandet; Antje Traue; Cung Le; Eddie Rouse
- Cinematography: Wedigo von Schultzendorff
- Edited by: Philipp Stahl; Yvonne Valdez
- Music by: Michl Britsch
- Production companies: Constantin Film; Impact Pictures
- Distributed by: Icon Film Distribution (United Kingdom); Constantin Film (Germany); Summit Entertainment (Overseas)
- Release dates: 25 September 2009 (United States); 1 October 2009 (Germany); 2 October 2009 (United Kingdom)
- Running time: 108 minutes
- Countries: United Kingdom; Germany
- Language: English
- Budget: $33 million
- Box office: $20.6 million

Pandorum is a 2009 science fiction horror film directed by Christian Alvart, produced by Robert Kulzer, Jeremy Bolt and Paul W. S. Anderson (the latter two through their Impact Pictures banner), and starring Dennis Quaid and Ben Foster. Travis Milloy wrote the screenplay from a story by Milloy and Alvart. The film's title is a fictional slang term for a form of psychosis caused by deep space and triggered by emotional stress, leading to severe paranoia, delirium, and nosebleeds. Pandorum was released on 25 September 2009 in the United States, and on 2 October 2009 in the UK. The film was poorly received.

== Plot ==
After human overpopulation depletes Earth's resources, humanity builds an interstellar ark, the Elysium. It carries 60,000 people on a 123-year trip to colonise Tanis, an Earth-like planet. The passengers are placed in hypersleep, and a rotating crew wake biennially to maintain the ship. Eight years into the mission, the ship receives a transmission from Earth: "You're all that's left of us. Good luck, God bless, and Godspeed."

An indeterminate time later, two members of 3-man 'flight team five', Corporal Bower and Lieutenant Payton, awaken. The third pod hosting Cooper is already empty. Improper emergence from hibernation leaves them both with partial amnesia and possibly suffering from pandorum, a space-related disorder that causes psychosis when under duress. Unable to leave their quarters due to power surges, Payton guides Bower via radio through the ventilation system to open the door from the outside, where he finds the decaying body of Cooper.

After dropping out of the vents, Bower is startled by a running figure. He follows it and finds a hanging, half-eaten corpse. The figure leaps at him with a knife, demanding his boots. Before Bower can comply, she disappears as creatures appear who take the corpse and chase Bower. He hides back in the vents as a creature takes Cooper's body mistaking it for Bower. Bower and Payton realise something has gone wrong, they decide the power surges means Bower must reset the reactor manually.

Travelling to the reactor, Bower encounters the figure again, Nadia, and Manh. After a brief scuffle, the trio decide to work together. Bower has lost radio contact with Payton but Nadia agrees to lead them to the generator. Pursued by cannibals they witness a hyper-sleep chamber opening and the emerging human devoured by the mutants. They flee into a barricaded chamber controlled by a paranoid Leland. Leland has been awake for many years, living off algae and cannibalism. Meanwhile corporal Gallo forces his way into Payton's quarters through the vents, claiming the ship is lost in space and that he killed his flight team in self-defence.

Leland explains the history of events on the ship since Earth was destroyed. Gallo went insane, killed his crew including the captain, and induced pandorum in the other awake passengers. After goading them into a violent and tribal culture, Gallo went back into hyper-sleep. Aided by accelerated evolution from an enzyme meant to help colonists adjust to life on Tanis, the descendants have transmogrified into cannibalistic mutants. Leland intends to eat the group but Bower convinces him the reactor must be stabilised.

Moving through the crew's (mostly empty) family hyper-sleep area Bower remembers he left his wife on Earth, unhinging Bower further. The group find the reactor, which turns out to be where the mutants nest. After a struggle, Bower restarts the reactor, killing many of the cannibals. In the chaos the group is split and flees. Manh is killed as the others all race to the bridge, with the remaining cannibals chasing them.

Gallo becomes increasingly erratic and agitated, unnerving Payton, who prepares a sedative. As they wrestle over the sedative, Payton realises Gallo is an hallucination. 'Payton' is really an aged Gallo, who took Payton's pod when he developed pandorum after hearing Earth was gone. Waking up with amnesia Gallo thought he was Payton. Gallo/Payton regains his composure entering the bridge killing Leland as he turns up. When Bower and Nadia enter and confront him, Gallo points out the bridge's windows, showing that the ship is adrift in deep space with no stars visible. This reveal pushes Bower further toward insanity, as Gallo argues to keep the violent society rather than revive civilisation.

Nadia observes ocean life through the windows as the computer displays that 923 years have elapsed since the mission launched, the ship has already landed itself on Tanis and now sits on the ocean floor. As the three fight, a stray shot breaks a window, flooding the bridge. Nadia and Bower escape to his hyper-sleep pod and eject it. The hull breach triggers an emergency protocol which ejects the remaining 1,211 active pods to the surface. Bower and Nadia surface near a lush coastline, and they witness the other pods break the surface.

== Cast ==
- Dennis Quaid as Payton
- Ben Foster as Bower
- Cam Gigandet as Gallo
- Antje Traue as Nadia
- Cung Le as Manh
- Eddie Rouse as Leland
- Norman Reedus as Shepard
- André Hennicke as Hunter Leader
- Friederike Kempter as Evalon
- Niels Bruno Schmidt as Insane Officer "Eden"
- Wotan Wilke Möhring as Young Bower's Father
- Jon Foster as Big Russian Passenger
- Jeff Burrell as Trapped Officer "Eden"
- Yangzom Brauen as 2nd Lieutenant [Team 4]

== Production ==
The film began life as a preliminary script written by Travis Milloy in the late 1990s. The story was originally set on a prison ship named Pandorum, transporting thousands of Earth's deadliest prisoners to another planet; the cannibal hunters were the result of the prisoners' degeneration. The characters played by Antje Traue and Cung Le were inmates. Ben Foster's character was a non-prisoner who did not trust anyone.

Believing no studio would want to make the film, Milloy thought about making it as a low-budget film shot on video in an abandoned paper mill with unknown actors. However, it attracted the attention of filmmaker Paul W. S. Anderson and Jeremy Bolt, and they gave it to Impact Pictures, who green-lit it. The producers gave the script to director Christian Alvart who was struck by the similarities to his own screenplay titled No Where. His dramatic story was about four astronauts aboard a settlers' ship who suffer from amnesia. Alvart decided that they should meld the two screenplays together, and the producers and Milloy agreed. With the ship now changed to a settler's ship, the use of the word "Pandorum" was changed from the name of the ship to a type of mental illness caused by sustained deep space travel.

Pandorum was announced in May 2008 with Quaid and Foster in lead roles. Christian Alvart was attached to direct the film from a script by Travis Milloy.

Filming took place at Babelsberg Studios in Potsdam, Germany in August 2008.

The movie was financed by Constantin Film through a joint venture deal with subsidiary Impact Pictures. The partnership helped fund the $40 million production. Constantin drew subsidies from Germany's Medienboard Berlin-Brandenburg (MBB) regional film fund, the German Federal Film Board (FFA) and the German Federal Film Fund (DFFF). The German Federal Film Fund provided $6 million to the production, the fund's second-largest 2008 payout after $7.5 million for Ninja Assassin.

== Release ==
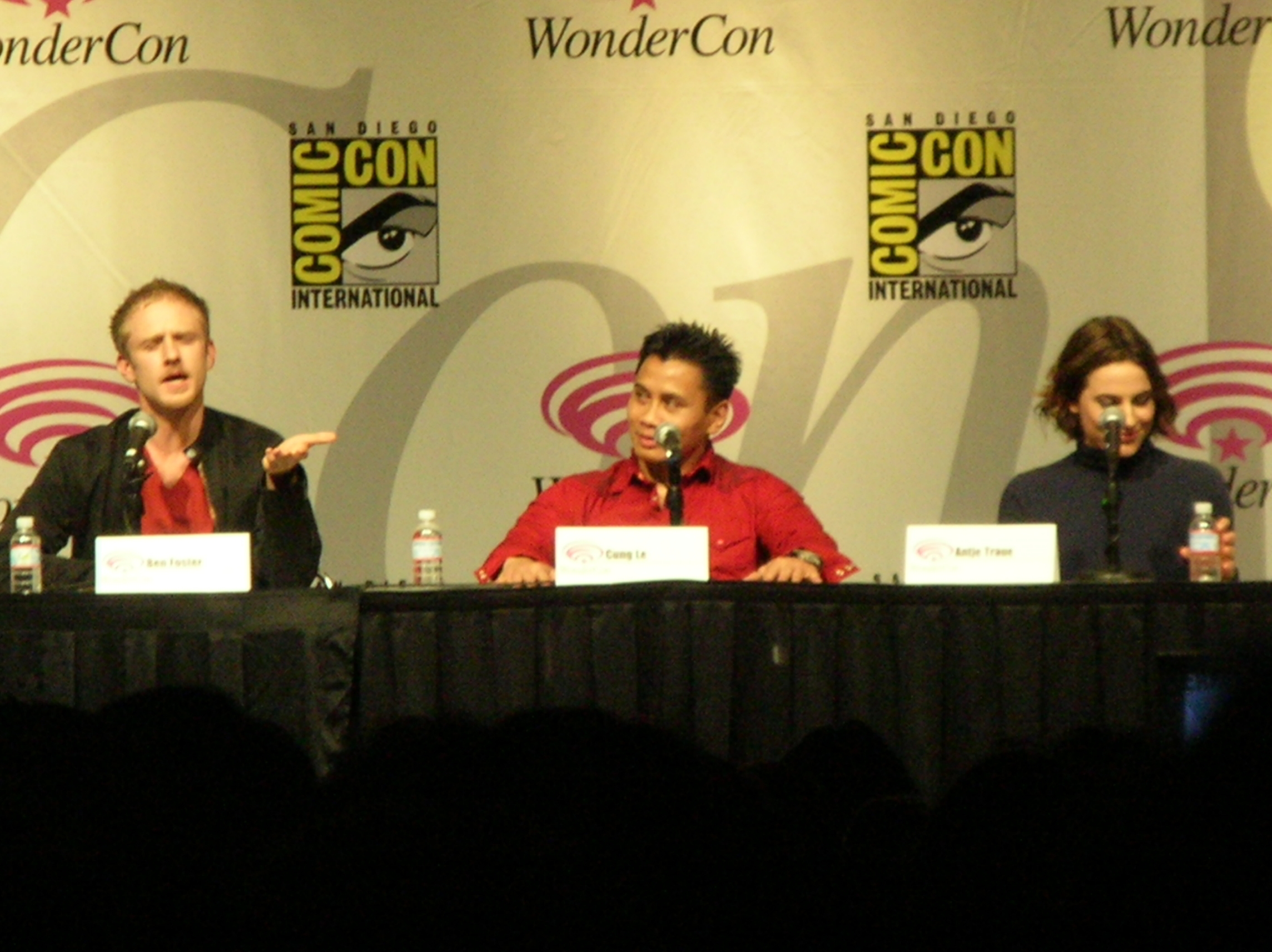
Ben Foster, Cung Le and Antje Traue talk about Pandorum at a panel discussion at WonderCon 2009.

Summit Entertainment handled foreign sales and presented Pandorum to buyers at the 2009 Cannes Film Festival. Overture Films distributed Pandorum in North America, Icon Film Distribution in the United Kingdom and Australia, Svensk Filmindustri in Scandinavia, and Movie Eye in Japan. The film was set up as a possible franchise. According to Travis Milloy, it was to have a sequel and a prequel. If it performed well, Impact Pictures could green-light one or more sequels.

The DVD and Blu-ray release occurred on 19 January 2010 in the United States over Anchor Bay Entertainment.

The director and producer commentaries on the DVD indicate that an unrated version of the movie exists but has not been released.

== Reception ==
Review aggregator Rotten Tomatoes reports an approval rating of 26% based on 87 reviews and an average rating of 4.6/10. The website's critical consensus reads, "While it might prove somewhat satisfying for devout sci-fi fans, Pandorum's bloated, derivative plot ultimately leaves it drifting in space." At Metacritic, which judges on a 0–100 scale, the film holds a "generally unfavorable" score of 28 based on 13 reviews.

Science fiction magazine SFX stated that "Pandorum is the finest interstellar horror in years" and awarded the film 4 stars out of 5. Film Ireland also gave Pandorum a positive review, appreciating the film's synergy of cinematic techniques, set design, and developed characters.

The film was a flop, grossing $20.6 million worldwide on a $33 million budget. It opened at No. 6 at the US box office with weekend receipts totaling $4.4 million. Overture Films declared bankruptcy the following year.

== Soundtrack ==
Pandorum

Soundtrack album by Michl Britsch
- Released: 25 September 2009
- Recorded: 2009
- Genre: Electronic
- Length: 71:06
- Label: Königskinder Schallplatten GmbH
- Producer: Michl Britsch

Track listing

1. "All That Is Left of Us" (2:43)
2. "Pandorum" (3:58)
3. "Anti Riot" (4:17)
4. "Shape" (2:03)
5. "Hunting Party" (2:48)
6. "Kulzer Complex" (4:40)
7. "Tanis Probe Broadcast" (2:01)
8. "Scars" (2:20)
9. "Fucking Solidarity" (3:28)
10. "Gallo's Birth" (2:22)
11. "Biolab Attack" (2:25)
12. "Kanyrna" (3:22)
13. "The Stars All Look Alike" (4:32)
14. "Boom" (3:55)
15. "Reactor" (4:08)
16. "Skin on Skin" (3:21)
17. "Fight Fight Fight" (2:56)
18. "Bower's Trip" (7:51)
19. "Discovery / End Credits" (7:55)

== See also ==
- Malthusianism
- Psychological and sociological effects of spaceflight
