= Soldier (1998 American film) =

1998 film by Paul Anderson

- Theatrical release poster
- Directed by: Paul Anderson
- Written by: David Webb Peoples
- Produced by: Jerry Weintraub
- Starring: Kurt Russell; Jason Scott Lee; Connie Nielsen; Michael Chiklis; Gary Busey
- Cinematography: David Tattersall
- Edited by: Martin Hunter
- Music by: Joel McNeely
- Production companies: Warner Bros.; Jerry Weintraub Productions; Morgan Creek Productions; Impact Pictures
- Distributed by: Warner Bros.
- Release date: October 23, 1998
- Running time: 99 minutes
- Countries: United States; United Kingdom
- Language: English
- Budget: $60 million
- Box office: $14.6 million

Soldier is a 1998 science fiction action film directed by Paul Anderson, written by David Webb Peoples, and starring Kurt Russell, Jason Scott Lee, Jason Isaacs, Connie Nielsen, Sean Pertwee, and Gary Busey.

The film tells the story of an unemotional rigidly disciplined laconic soldier of the future who is left for dead, befriends a group of refugees, then faces his former superiors and soldiers who are determined to achieve their goal by eliminating the refugees.

The film premiered worldwide by Warner Bros. on October 23, 1998. Upon release, Soldier received generally negative reviews, although many praised the action sequences and Russell's performance. The film was also a box-office failure, grossing $14.6 million worldwide against a production budget of $60 million. Despite the financial failure, the film has now become a cult film.

== Plot ==
In 1996, an experimental military program selects and raises a group of orphaned infants to be trained as highly disciplined, ruthless, professional soldiers. Recruits considered physically or mentally underperforming are culled and the survivors are turned into ultimate fighting “machines” with no understanding of the civilian world.

In 2036, Sgt. Todd 3465 is a hardened veteran and one of the original 1996 infants, but his unit is about to be replaced by genetically engineered super soldiers, designed with superior physical attributes and a lack of emotion, except complete aggression. Colonel Mekum, leader of the project, introduces his newest group to Captain Church, the commander of Todd's unit, who insists on testing the new soldiers' abilities against his battle proven soldiers. Mekum suggests pitting three original soldiers against one new soldier, Caine 607, who easily defeats the three. Cain bites down on Todd’s arm so Todd gouges out Caine's eye to break free before falling from a great height. The body of a dead soldier cushions his fall, and he appears to be dead. Mekum orders their bodies disposed, declaring them obsolete, while the remaining older soldiers are demoted to menial support roles. For carelessly losing his eye, Cain is demoted to take point.

Todd is discarded on Arcadia 234, a waste disposal planet. He limps toward a colony whose residents crash-landed there years earlier; as they were believed dead, no rescue missions have been attempted. Todd is sheltered by Mace and his wife Sandra. Though they try to make him welcome, Todd has difficulty adapting to the conflict-free civilian community due to his hyper-vigilant military conditioning. While Todd develops a silent rapport with their mute son, Nathan, who had been traumatized by a snakebite as an infant, he soon begins to experience flashbacks from his time as a soldier and mistakes one of the colonists for an enemy, nearly killing him. To make matters worse, in a later conflict with a snake, Todd forces Nathan to face it down and strike back to protect himself. His parents disapprove of the lesson, unsure of how to deal with Todd.

Fearful, the colonists expel Todd from the community. Experiencing strong emotion for the first time, Todd is confused when, overcome by loss, he cries for the first time. A short time later, Mace and Sandra are almost bitten by a snake while they sleep, but they are saved by Nathan, who uses Todd's lesson. Now understanding the value of Todd's lesson, they seek him to reintegrate him into the community, but the other members resist.

On a training exercise the new genetically engineered super soldiers arrive on the garbage planet. Since the world is listed as uninhabited, Colonel Mekum, at first unaware of the colonists, still determines them and any violators as legitimate targets. The soldiers spot Mace and kill him just after he finds Todd. Though out-manned and outgunned, Todd's years of battle experience and superior knowledge of the planet allow him to return to the colony and kill the advance squad. Realizing that an unknown enemy force might be confronting them, Colonel Mekum orders the soldiers to withdraw and return with heavy artillery. Using guerrilla tactics and exploiting their procedures, Todd outmaneuvers and defeats all of the remaining soldiers, including his nemesis, Caine 607, whom he barely defeats after vicious hand-to-hand combat by using guile.

Panicking, Mekum orders the transport ship's remaining crew, composed of Todd's old squad, to deploy a portable doomsday device powerful enough to destroy the planet. He then orders the ship to lift off, leaving the squad behind. Hearing an order to leave his men behind, Captain Church objects, Mekum shoots him in cold blood. Before take off, Todd appears and with one stern look at the situation, causes his old comrades to silently side with him over Mekum and take over the ship. They throw Mekum and his aides out then evacuate the remaining colonists. In a panicked attempt to disarm the Doomsday device, Mekum accidentally sets it off, killing him and his aides. Todd pilots the ship from Arcadia just ahead of the shockwave and sets course for the Trinity Moons, the colonists' original destination. He picks up Nathan and points to their new destination, while looking out upon the galaxy.

== Cast ==
- Kurt Russell as Sergeant Todd "3465"
  - Jesse Littlejohn as 8-year-old Todd
  - Wyatt Russell as 11-year-old Todd
- Jason Scott Lee as Caine 607
- Jason Isaacs as Colonel Mekum
- Connie Nielsen as Sandra
- Sean Pertwee as Mace
- Jared & Taylor Thorne as Nathan
- Mark Bringelson as Lieutenant Rubrick
- Gary Busey as Captain Church
- K. K. Dodds as Lieutenant Sloan
- James R. Black as Riley
- Kyle Sullivan as Tommy
- Corbin Bleu as Johnny
- Sara Paxton as Angie
- Jesse D. Goins as Chester
- Mark De Alessandro as Goines
- Vladimir Orlov as Romero
- Carsten Norgaard as Green
- Duffy Gaver as Chelsey
- Brenda Wehle as Hawkins
- Michael Chiklis as Jimmy Pig
- Elizabeth Dennehy as Jimmy Pig's wife
- Paul Dillon as Slade
- Max Daniels as Red
- Paul Sklar as Melton 249
- Ellen Crawford as Ilona
- Conni Marie Brazelton as Eva
- Danny Turner as Omar
- Liz Huett as Janice
- Jesse Littlejohn as Will
- Alexander Denk as Military Observer
- Jeremy Bolt as Enemy Soldier
- Greg Stechman as Trainee 101

== Production ==
Kurt Russell spoke only 104 words in the entire movie despite being in 85% of the scenes. During the first week of shooting he broke his left ankle, then the top of his right foot four days later, so the entire production needed to be rescheduled. The filmmakers first shot scenes involving Russell lying down, followed by scenes of Russell sitting, Russell standing but not moving, and so on.

== Reception ==
=== Box office ===
Soldier grossed $14.6 million in the United States.

=== Critical response ===
On the review aggregator website Rotten Tomatoes, 19% of 54 critics' reviews are positive. The website's consensus reads: "A boring genre film and a waste of a good set." Audiences polled by CinemaScore gave the film an average grade of "B+" on an A+ to F scale.

Bruce Westbrook of the Houston Chronicle commented that "the action is handled fairly well, but it's routine, and there's no satisfaction in seeing Todd waste men who are no more bloodthirsty than he is." Lisa Schwarzbaum of Entertainment Weekly criticized the film's overuse of genre clichés, saying "any cliché you can dream up for a futuristic action movie, any familiar big-budget epic you can think to rip off, Soldier has gotten there first." Michael Wilmington of the Chicago Tribune described the film as "a big, clanging, brutal actioner in which we search the murk in vain for the sparks of humanity the moviemakers keep promising us." Lisa Alspector of the Chicago Reader found the film to be enjoyable, calling Russell's performance "persuasive" and saying "this appealing formulaic action adventure displays a lot of conviction in its not-too-flashy action scenes and a little levity in the gradual socialization of Russell's character." Similarly, Kevin Thomas of the Los Angeles Times gave the film a rating of 3.5 out of 5 and called it "a potent comic-book-style action-adventure." Eddie Harrison of film-authority.com wrote "...while humour is sorely lacking in Soldier, the brutalist sci-fi tone holds throughout, and it's easy to get behind Todd's stubborn unwillingness to be thrown out with the trash..." Critic Niall Browne of Movies in Focus wrote "Soldier finally deserves a reappraisal. The Kurt Russell starrer is actually a hugely entertaining and visually arresting piece of science fiction cinema – at the centre of it is a bold performance from Russell – one in which he only speaks 104 words."

== Connection with Blade Runner ==
Soldier was written by David Webb Peoples, who co-wrote the script for the 1982 film Blade Runner. In 1998 he said that he considers Soldier to be a "spin-off sidequel"-spiritual successor to Blade Runner, seeing both films as existing in a shared fictional universe. The film obliquely refers to various elements of stories written by Philip K. Dick (who wrote the 1968 novel Do Androids Dream of Electric Sheep?, on which Blade Runner is based), or film adaptations thereof. A Spinner from Blade Runner can be seen in the wreckage on the junk planet in the film and Russell's character is shown to have fought in the battles referred to in Roy Batty’s (Rutger Hauer) dying monologue: ...the Shoulder of Orion and Tannhäuser Gate. The script was 15 years old at the time of production.

In an interview conducted with Danny Stewart for Stewart's book about the movie, published in 2023, when asked if Soldier was initially conceived as a "side-quel" to Blade Runner that was set in the same universe, Peoples stated "No, I never had any thoughts about that... I wrote Soldier in 1984. Very quickly on my own. I wrote it because I saw the first Terminator in the theater, stunned. And it was such a wonderful movie. I’d always wanted to write a movie in which there was a tough guy who would be seemingly unsympathetic in the lead, and I felt that The Terminator was almost there. Later in the sequel, it was determined he was the hero, but at the time, he was sort of a villain. But the fact is, he was so great. I went off, and I decided to write about this soldier."

== Home media ==
Soldier was released on VHS and DVD on March 2, 1999, and on Blu-ray on July 26, 2011. It was released on Ultra HD Blu-ray on April 28, 2026 from Arrow Video.
