= Impact Pictures =

Independent film production company

- Formerly: Impact Pictures, Ltd.; Impact Pictures, LLC; Impact Pictures, Inc.; AB^{2} Digital Pictures
- Type: Private
- Industry: Film
- Incorporated: December 6, 2000 (as Impact Pictures, Ltd.)
- Founded: 1992
- Founder: Jeremy Bolt; Paul W. S. Anderson
- Defunct: July 8, 2014 (as Impact Pictures, Ltd.)
- Fate: Dissolved via voluntary strike-off (as Impact Pictures, Ltd.)
- Headquarters: Delaware, U.S. (as of 2026)
- Products: Motion pictures
- Parent: Constantin Film (c. 2003–2009)

Impact Pictures is an independent film production company founded in 1992 by British producer Jeremy Bolt and filmmaker Paul W. S. Anderson. Aside from Anderson's film projects (including the Resident Evil film series), the company has also been involved in a number of TV and independent productions.

Although the production entity operated from the early 1990s, the UK private limited company Impact Pictures Limited was formally incorporated on 6 December 2000, with Bolt as the company secretary and Anderson as the company director. Impact Pictures Limited was dissolved via voluntary strike-off on 8 July 2014. The company continued to be credited simply as "Impact Pictures" on films; related entities or copyright claimants in the United States have included Impact Pictures, LLC and Impact Pictures, Inc. Production credits have also appeared under Canadian (credited as Impact Canada on Resident Evil: Apocalypse) and U.S. branches. Monster Hunter (2020) used the name AB2 Digital Pictures for the company.

By 2000, Impact Pictures was based in both the United Kingdom and the United States and entered a joint venture with the German company Constantin Film to co-produce films. From circa 2003 and continuing during the co-productions of The Dark (2005) and Pandorum (2009), it operated as a subsidiary of Constantin. According to Constantin Film as of March 2006, Impact Pictures Ltd. was based in London and Impact Pictures LLC was based in Delaware; Constantin held a 100% equity interest in the Ltd. company and a 51% equity interest in the LLC. Impact Pictures LLC still exists in Delaware as of 2026 and is partnered with the Swiss company Highlight Event and Entertainment AG. Impact Pictures has also worked with several other larger studios, most frequently Davis Films and Screen Gems.

== Films ==
- The Big Fish (1992)
- Shopping (1994)
- Stiff Upper Lips (1997)
- Event Horizon (1997)
- Soldier (1998)
- Vigo (1999)
- The Sight (2000)
- There's Only One Jimmy Grimble (2000)
- Massacre Up North (2001)
- The Hole (2001)
- Resident Evil (2002)
- AVP: Alien vs. Predator (2004)
- Resident Evil: Apocalypse (2004)
- The Dark (2005)
- DOA: Dead or Alive (2006)
- Death Race (2008)
- Resident Evil: Extinction (2007)
- Pandorum (2009)
- Resident Evil: Afterlife (2010)
- Death Race 2 (2010)
- The Three Musketeers (2011)
- Lost Christmas (2011)
- Resident Evil: Retribution (2012)
- Death Race 3: Inferno (2013)
- Pompeii (2014)
- Resident Evil: The Final Chapter (2016)
- Death Race: Beyond Anarchy (2018)
- Monster Hunter (2020) (under AB2 Digital Pictures)
- Resident Evil: Welcome to Raccoon City (2021)
