= DOA: Dead or Alive =

2006 film by Corey Yuen

- British theatrical release poster
- Directed by: Corey Yuen
- Screenplay by: Adam Gross; Seth Gross; J. F. Lawton
- Story by: J. F. Lawton
- Based on: Dead or Alive by Tecmo
- Produced by: Jeremy Bolt; Paul W. S. Anderson; Robert Kulzer; Bernd Eichinger; Mark A. Altman
- Starring: Jaime Pressly; Holly Valance; Sarah Carter; Natassia Malthe; Devon Aoki
- Cinematography: Venus Keung; Chan Chi Ying
- Edited by: Cheung Ka-Fai; Eddie Hamilton; Angie Lam
- Music by: Junkie XL
- Production companies: Impact Pictures; VIP 4 Medienfonds; Mindfire Entertainment
- Distributed by: Constantin Film (Germany); Universal Pictures International (through United International Pictures; select territories); The Weinstein Company (United States); Summit Entertainment (International)
- Release dates: September 7, 2006 (Australia); September 15, 2006 (United Kingdom); October 19, 2006 (Germany); June 15, 2007 (United States)
- Running time: 87 minutes
- Countries: United Kingdom; Germany; United States
- Language: English
- Budget: $30 million
- Box office: $7.7 million

DOA: Dead or Alive is a 2006 martial arts action film based on the fighting video game franchise Dead or Alive. It is directed by Hong Kong filmmaker Corey Yuen and written by J. F. Lawton and Adam and Seth Gross. In the film, fighters are invited to Dead or Alive, an invitational martial arts contest. The four female fighters begin as rivals, but work together to uncover the secret that the organizer of the tournament is trying to hide. It features an ensemble cast and has various appearances from characters of the franchise, led by Kasumi (Devon Aoki), Christie Allen (Holly Valance) and Tina Armstrong (Jaime Pressly).

Principal photography took place from May to July 2005 in Bangkok, Guilin, Hengdian, and Hong Kong. It is an international co-production between Germany, United States and the United Kingdom.

DOA: Dead or Alive was first released on September 7, 2006, in Australia. It was later released in the United Kingdom on September 15 by United International Pictures, and in Germany on October 19, 2006, by Constantin Film. The film was a critical and commercial failure, grossing $7.7 million worldwide against a $30 million budget. The United States release was delayed and the film was eventually given a limited release on June 15, 2007, by The Weinstein Company under Dimension Films. Despite its generally poor reception, some audiences praised its impressive wire-fu choreography and the way it captured the video game's famous "eye-candy" visuals.

== Plot ==
A group of martial artists and combat masters are invited to a fighting tournament, "Dead or Alive", on an isolated island within an advanced complex, with the ultimate prize of $10 million.

Among the competitors are Kasumi, a shinobi ninja-princess looking for her brother Hayate who competed in the previous tournament; Tina Armstrong, a professional wrestler setting out to prove herself; Tina's father Bass Armstrong; Christie Allen, a master thief, assassin and hitwoman; her treacherous partner Maximillian 'Max' Marsh; and Ryu Hayabusa, a friend of Kasumi and Hayate who follows Kasumi to keep her safe. Another competitor is Helena Douglas, daughter of the tournament's late founder Fame Douglas.

When they arrive, they are monitored by the island's supervisor, Dr. Victor Donovan, who, aided by egghead Weatherby, is using injected nano-sensors to gather data from the fights for some mysterious project. Max and Christie plan to steal the fortune stowed away inside a hidden vault during the tournament. In addition, an assassin from Kasumi's colony, named Ayane, followed Kasumi to kill her and wipe away the disgrace the princess had caused to the clan.

The tournament plays out, with multiple combatants fighting and being defeated until only Kasumi, Christie, Hayabusa, and Tina are left. Helena is defeated by Christie. During her fight, Christie sees that the key to finding and unlocking the vault is a tattoo on the back of Helena's neck.

Meanwhile, Kasumi begins to suspect Donovan of lying about her brother being killed in the previous tournament, and Hayabusa, infiltrating the main facility to find the truth, is captured. She is more than once confronted and nearly killed by Ayane, whom Kasumi tries to convince that Hayate is alive. Also, Weatherby begins to fall for Helena, and tells her about what he knows of the mystery project and that before Helena's father could shut the project down, he died mysteriously.

On the tournament's final day, wondering where Hayabusa is, Kasumi, Christie, and Tina look for him and discover a secret entrance to the main complex, where they find Hayabusa unconscious. They are then gassed and captured. Meanwhile, Helena resolves to stop the mystery project and has to fight the armed staff of the island, who are sent by Donovan to kill her and Weatherby. They are followed inside by Max, who finds his way to the vault and is knocked out by Bayman, who works for Donovan.

Inside the main complex, Donovan shows the four semifinalists the project he has been developing; an advanced form of neural interface that allows him and others to use the fighters' combined skills to become the ultimate fighter. After downloading the data into the device in the form of a pair of sunglasses, he reveals that he kept Hayate alive and in peak condition to test the technology. He defeats Hayate and prepares to sell the technology around the world and begins downloading it to the watching buyers. Weatherby stops the broadcast and alerts the CIA. Helena keeps Donovan back while Weatherby frees the others, but both are defeated, and Donovan activates a self-destruct sequence that will obliterate the base.

Kasumi, Helena, Christie, Tina, Ayane, and Hayate launch a combined attack on Donovan, while Hayabusa and Weatherby find Max and escape with him, despite Max's urge to return for the money. During the fight, Donovan's glasses are knocked off, and Hayate and Kasumi easily paralyze him. The fighters then all escape as the base explodes and Donovan is consumed by the blast. They hijack a boat from a group of pirates.

Later, Helena, Ayane, Christie, Tina, and Kasumi stand together again in Kasumi's palace preparing to fight an army of ninjas.

== Cast ==
- Jaime Pressly as Tina Armstrong, a professional wrestler
- Devon Aoki as Kasumi, a shinobi ninja-princess looking for her missing brother
- Holly Valance as Christie Allen, a thief, assassin and hitwoman
- Sarah Carter as Helena Douglas, the daughter of DOATEC's founder
- Natassia Malthe as Ayane, a ninja assassin whose mission is to seek out and kill Kasumi
- Kane Kosugi as Ryu Hayabusa, a ninja from Kasumi's clan and a faithful friend to her and Hayate
- Matthew Marsden as Maximillian "Max" Marsh, a thief and Christie's partner
- Eric Roberts as Victor Donovan, the tournament organizer who has gained control of DOATEC after the death of Helena's father
- Steve Howey as Weatherby, the head scientist of DOATEC
- Brian J. White as Zack, an eccentric DJ and fighter
- Kevin Nash as Bass Armstrong, a professional wrestler and Tina's overprotective father
- Collin Chou as Hayate, a ninja and Kasumi's brother who disappeared during the last tournament

Additionally, Derek Boyer plays Bayman, a Russian soldier, while Silvio Simac appears as Leon, an Italian mercenary. Chad McCord plays the Chief Detective who tries to arrest Christie in Hong Kong, Martin Crewes plays Tina's Butler, and Robin Shou appears as the Pirate Leader. Several characters from the game series appear in minor roles played by stuntmen – Song Lin as Brad Wong, Ying Wang as Lei Fang, Hung Lin as Hitomi, and Fang Liu as Gen Fu.

== Production ==
Principal photography commenced on May 4, 2005, and concluded on July 19, 2005. Filming locations include Bangkok, Guilin, Hengdian, and Hong Kong. The production budget was estimated to be $30 million. The film was the first Western production shot largely in China's Hengdian World Studios, where Hero and House of Flying Daggers had been shot. The film was scored by Junkie XL.

Sarah Carter had worked with Natassia Malthe five times before and with Holly Valance three times. The actors trained together for three months before going to China, where they trained for another month. Training included wu shu and kung fu, as well as wire training. The heat and humidity made the fight scenes particularly challenging. Another challenge was translation; on set, people spoke English, Cantonese, Mandarin, and the regional dialect of whatever area they were shooting in at the time. Pressly had some previous experience with martial arts, training with her own trainer for nine years, and she had a recurring role in the Mortal Kombat television series. Valance had trained in muay thai since her teens and found it more difficult to learn kung-fu as there were many things she had to relearn.

Pressly praised the tireless work of director Corey Yuen and the crew, saying the crew worked two units, seventeen hours a day, getting four hours of sleep, and getting back up and doing it again.

== Release ==
The film was first released September 7, 2006 in Australia. The film was released in North America on June 15, 2007, without press screenings. The Weinstein Company delayed the US release of the film by almost a year.

=== Box office ===
In non-North American markets, the film brought in over $7 million at the international box office, with almost $1 million in both the UK and Australia. In the US, the film made $260,713 in its opening weekend. It was released into 505 theaters, and spent 21 days in theaters, closing on July 5 with a domestic gross of $480,813 (about 6.4% of the worldwide gross at the time). The film grossed $7.7 million worldwide.

=== Critical response ===
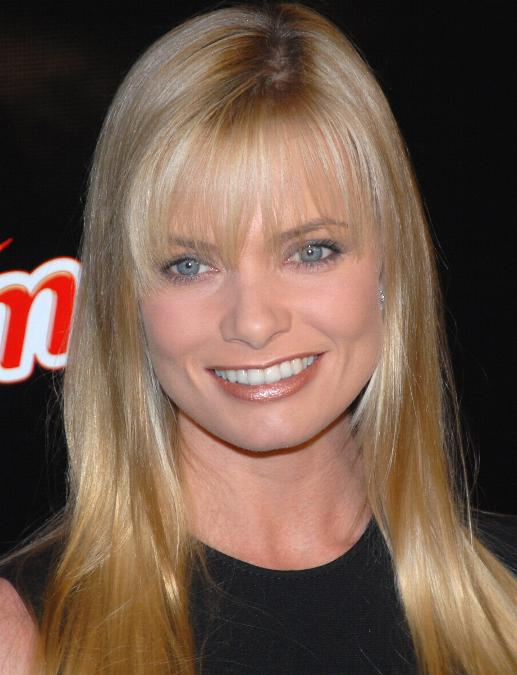
Jaime Pressly was praised for her performance.

Reviews were generally negative. On Rotten Tomatoes the film has an approval rating of 33% based on 46 reviews, with an average rating of 4.7/10. The site's critics consensus reads, "With a ridiculous plot and comical acting, checking one's brain at the door is required before watching DOA: Dead or Alive." On Metacritic, the film has a weighted average score of 38 out of 100 based on 8 critics, indicating "generally unfavorable" reviews.

Joe Leydon of Variety called it a "whirring blur of hot babes and cool fights" but complained the film is insubstantial and not enough even to appeal to genre fans with lowered expectations, suggesting it belongs in the video store and on late night television. He described the film as "a caffeinated mash-up" of Enter the Dragon, Mortal Kombat, Charlie's Angels and a few other films, but did praise Yuen for his show-stopping spectacles and compared an outdoor sword fight saying it "looks like a collaboration between Gene Kelly and Bruce Lee". Jack Mathews of the New York Daily News gave the film 1 out of 5 stars, calling it "laughably silly". He said the action was curiously bloodless, and the choreography not that good. Josh Rosenblatt of the Austin Chronicle panned the film, saying "the most glaring problem with DOA: not that it goes too far but that it doesn't go far enough" and called the film: "A piece of garbage and the best argument for reading books since the first pop-up appeared."

L.A. Weekly gave the film a favorable review comparing it to Charlie's Angels and praising the director for providing "one of the year's purest entertainments" and "pretty much nonstop fighting, mostly in very little clothing, with the flair you expect from a master choreographer like Yuen. It's awesome." Gregory Kirschling of Entertainment Weekly gave it a grade "B" and wrote: "If you only ever see one bad movie about warrior chicks who meet on a tropical isle for a fight contest, make it DOA: Dead or Alive." Michael Ferraro from Film Threat credited the film with the unusual accomplishment of following the plot of the game series it is based on, even including a volleyball sequence, although he is critical there is not all that much plot. He described the acting and dialog as atrocious, and is bored by the action and fighting but calls the result hilarious, and suggested it as the kind of film you might watch with a group of drunken friends, adding your own commentary track. Kim Newman of The Times gave the film a positive review: "This is the best film yet adapted from a computer game — it doesn't even try to add depth and simply delivers what the fans expect (plenty of ninja babes) with as few trimmings as possible." In 2011 in the book Nightmare Movies: Horror on Screen Since the 1960s, Newman wrote: "If I had to pick a game-based 'guilty pleasure', it would be DOA: Dead or Alive".

Of the performances, some critics were positive about Pressly, and negative about Aoki.

=== Home media ===
A DVD of DOA: Dead or Alive was released on September 11, 2007. In the first week, 68,578 units were sold in the United States, earning $1,370,874 and a #12 ranking on the week's DVD sales. In the United States and Canada, the DVD earned $1.9 million in domestic video sales.

== See also ==
- List of films based on video games
