= Pompeii (film) =

2014 film by Paul W. S. Anderson

- Theatrical release poster
- Directed by: Paul W. S. Anderson
- Written by: Janet Scott Batchler; Lee Batchler; Michael Robert Johnson
- Produced by: Paul W. S. Anderson; Jeremy Bolt; Robert Kulzer; Don Carmody
- Starring: Kit Harington; Carrie-Anne Moss; Emily Browning; Adewale Akinnuoye-Agbaje; Jessica Lucas; Jared Harris; Kiefer Sutherland
- Cinematography: Glen MacPherson
- Edited by: Michelle Conroy
- Music by: Clinton Shorter
- Production companies: Constantin Film International; Impact Pictures
- Distributed by: TriStar Pictures (Note: Distributed through Sony Pictures Releasing); FilmDistrict (North America); Constantin Film (Germany); Summit Entertainment (International)
- Release dates: February 18, 2014 (Buenos Aires); February 21, 2014 (North America); February 27, 2014 (Germany)
- Running time: 105 minutes
- Countries: Germany; Canada; United States
- Language: English
- Budget: $80–100 million
- Box office: $117.8 million

Pompeii is a 2014 romantic historical disaster film produced and directed by Paul W. S. Anderson. An international co-production between the United States, Germany and Canada, it is a fictional tale inspired by the eruption of Mount Vesuvius in 79 AD that destroyed Pompeii, a city of the Roman Empire. The film stars Kit Harington, Carrie-Anne Moss, Emily Browning, Adewale Akinnuoye-Agbaje, Jessica Lucas, Jared Harris and Kiefer Sutherland.

Pompeii premiered in France, Belgium, and Russia on February 19, 2014, and was released the following day in Argentina, Greece, Hungary, Italy, and, later, in the United States and Canada on February 21, 2014. This is FilmDistrict's last film before it merged with Focus Features. The film received negative reviews from critics and grossed $117.8 million against a budget of $80-100 million.

== Plot ==
In northern Britannia, AD 62, Roman soldiers led by General Quintus Attius Corvus wipe out a tribe of Celtic horsemen. Corvus personally kills the parents of a boy named Milo. Being the only survivor, Milo is later captured by slave traders.

Seventeen years later, in Londinium in AD 79, the grown Milo becomes a popular gladiator. His owner Graecus brings the gladiators to Pompeii. Also going there are Cassia and her servant Ariadne, who return after a year in Rome. Cassia becomes enamored of Milo after witnessing him perform a mercy kill of a critically injured horse; she reveres this as an act of kindness. Her parents are the city governor Severus and his wife Aurelia. One of their servants is later swallowed up when a quake from Mount Vesuvius opens up the ground under him.

In Pompeii, Milo develops a rivalry with Atticus, a champion gladiator who, by Roman law, will be given his freedom after he earns one more victory. The gladiators are shown off at a party where Corvus, now a Senator, announces that he will invest in Severus' plans to rebuild Pompeii. It is then revealed that Cassia originally left Rome to escape Corvus' unreciprocal advances.

When an earthquake causes some horses to become nervous, Milo is permitted to calm one down. He then takes Cassia on a ride. Being aware that they cannot be together, he returns her to the villa. Not recognizing Milo, Corvus is ready to kill him, but Cassia pleads for his life. Milo is lashed for his actions, and Atticus admits respect for his rival.

In the Amphitheatre of Pompeii, to punish Milo, Corvus orders him killed in the first battle, and trainer Bellator convinces Graecus to execute Atticus as well. The two men, and other slaves, are chained to rocks as, in an attempt to recreate Corvus' victory over the Celts, gladiators are unleashed upon the slaves. Working together, Milo and Atticus survive the battle, with the latter realizing that the Romans will never honor his freedom.

Meanwhile, Corvus forces Cassia to agree to marry him by threatening to have her family killed for supposed treason against Emperor Titus. When Milo and Atticus win, Cassia defies Corvus by holding a "thumbs-up", saving them from execution. Corvus has her locked up in the villa and has his officer Proculus fight Milo one-on-one. Their battle is interrupted when Mount Vesuvius erupts, creating tremors that cause the arena to collapse, sending Milo and Proculus crashing to the dungeons. Milo opens up the gates, allowing his fellow gladiators a chance to attack their captors; Proculus escapes, while Bellator is killed by the mob. Enraged, the critically injured Severus tries to kill an unconscious Corvus, only for him to awaken, stab him instead and escape.

Flaming debris rains down upon the city as everyone tries to flee to the harbor. Before succumbing to her injuries, Aurelia tells Milo that Cassia is at the villa. There, Milo manages to save Cassia, but Ariadne is killed when the villa collapses into the Mediterranean Sea. One fireball sinks a ship, killing the escaping Graecus. Atticus tries to reach the harbor, which is destroyed along with several ships when a tsunami created by the volcano smashes into the city. Reuniting with Atticus, Milo suggests searching the arena for horses to escape.

As the gladiators face Roman soldiers at the arena, Cassia goes to see her fallen parents but is abducted by Corvus. Milo chases after the chariot carrying the two while Atticus fights Proculus. Atticus is mortally wounded in the duel, but nonetheless manages to kill Proculus. Cassia frees herself before the chariot crashes into the Temple of Apollo. Milo and Corvus duel aboard the chariot as a fireball destroys the temple. Cassia then chains Corvus to a building, as Milo reveals who he is. He declares that Celtic gods are coming to punish Corvus. Milo and Cassia ride off as a pyroclastic surge races into the city, incinerating Corvus. At the arena, Atticus proclaims that he dies a free man before being consumed with the city.

At the outskirts, the horse throws off Milo and Cassia. Milo tells Cassia to leave him, explaining that the horse is not fast enough to carry them both. Instead, she lets the horse go, knowing they cannot outrun the surge. In their final moments, they kiss as the surge engulfs them. When the dust settles, their petrified bodies are shown in an eternal embrace.

== Cast ==
- Kit Harington as Milo, a gladiator
  - Dylan Schombing as young Milo
- Emily Browning as Cassia, daughter to Severus and Aurelia
- Kiefer Sutherland as Senator Quintus Attius Corvus
- Carrie-Anne Moss as Aurelia, wife of Severus
- Jared Harris as Marcus Cassius Severus, the city governor of Pompeii
- Adewale Akinnuoye-Agbaje as Atticus, a gladiator
- Jessica Lucas as Ariadne, a servant to Cassia
- Joe Pingue as Graecus, a slave owner
- Currie Graham as Bellator, a slave trainer
- Sasha Roiz as Marcus Proculus, Corvus's Officer
- Dalmar Abuzeid as Felix, a slave to Severus
- Jean-Francois Lachapelle as Milo's Father
- Rebecca Eady as Milo's Mother
- Jean Frenette as Boss Slaver
- Maxime Savaria as Biggest Thracian
- Ron Kennell as The Weasel
- Tom Bishop Sr. as Cassia's Carriage Driver
- Emmanuel Kabongo as African Gladiator
- Brock Johnson as Flashback Centurion
- Kristina Nicoll as Rich Wife #1
- Janine Theriault as Rich Wife #2
- Mark Whelan as Ship's Captain
- Anais Frenette as Harbour Child
- Donna Christo as Harbour Mother
- Thomas Stumpo as Harbour Boy

== Production ==
The film was shot in Toronto, Ontario, from March to July 2013, primarily at Cinespace Film Studios' Kipling Avenue facility. Constantin Film and Don Carmody Productions had previously used Cinespace as a shooting locale for Resident Evil: Retribution (2012) and The Mortal Instruments: City of Bones (2013).

Leading man Kit Harington underwent a gruelling training regimen for the film in order to bulk up for the role:

"I wanted to do a body transformation for something—it was one of those processes that I had never really done before ... I became obsessed with it. To the point where I was going to the gym three times a day for six days a week. I was becoming exhausted. So the trainer stepped in and said, 'Look, you don't need to go through all of this. This is body dysmorphia now.'"

Kiefer Sutherland commented that working on Pompeii was "much more fun" than many of his other feature films, and commented positively on working with Paul W. S. Anderson:

He commands a set with absolute authority. He's the guy in charge. And as an actor, to work for a director who knows exactly what he wants. He's so technically proficient that I'm not even aware we're shooting a 3D movie. That is a real testament to him and his crew that have done this before and know how to do it. But as nice as he is, he's very clear about what he wants. It's such a gift to work in that. There's a real safety in that. Again, I can push this direction all I want, but he'll pull me back and make sure I'm fitting into the context of this film. It's just one of the most comfortable environments I've ever been in.

Pompeii was the fourth time that director Anderson used 3D cameras in his films, the first being Resident Evil: Afterlife in 2010. Resident Evil producers Jeremy Bolt and Don Carmody reunited with Anderson for the film. FilmDistrict bought the distribution rights in the US, and because of Sony's relationship with the filmmakers, they chose to release the film with TriStar Pictures. Summit Entertainment, who released Anderson's The Three Musketeers, handled distribution sales outside of Germany, Austria and the US (through Lionsgate). Sutherland and Emily Browning adopted British-style accents for their roles, reflecting the convention of using British accents in historical settings.

== Reception ==
=== Box office ===
Pompeii grossed $10.3 million in its opening weekend in North America, where it finished in third; 62% of audiences were stated to be over the age of 30, 52% male and 48% female, and the film was projected to gross $25 million at the domestic box office. Outside of North America, it performed much better: "playing in 37 markets, the 3D disaster movie earned an estimated $22.8 million". As of June 30, 2014, the film has grossed $23.2 million in North America and $78.6 million in other territories for a worldwide total of $117.8 million.

The film won the Academy of Canadian Cinema and Television's Golden Screen Award for 2014 as the year's top-grossing Canadian film.

=== Critical response ===
On review aggregation website Rotten Tomatoes 27% of 170 critics gave the film a positive review, with an average rating of 4.40/10. The site's critics consensus reads: "This big-budget sword-and-sandal adventure lacks the energy and storytelling heft to amount to more than a guilty pleasure." On Metacritic the film has a weighted average score of 41 out of 100 based on 33 critics, indicating "mixed or average" reviews. Audiences polled by CinemaScore gave the film an average grade of "B" on an A+ to F scale.

Paul W. S. Anderson's direction, while occasionally considered derivative of the storytelling methods of other blockbuster films such as Gladiator (2000) and Titanic (1997), nevertheless received some praise. Matt Patches, writing for Grantland, identified his work as a "labor of love" with "visionary" proportions. Some critics were rather favorable, as shown by Vulture's review, which summarized the film as

not a particularly original story, but it gallops along at a nice clip, with the good guys appropriately gallant and breathless and the bad guys appropriately smug and snarly ... And whether it's elaborate gladiatorial battles or a chariot chase through a burning city, Anderson directs with precision, rhythm, and ruthlessness – he has an eye and an ear for violence, for the visceral impact of a kill. At his best, he creates action sequences in which you feel anything might happen, even though you usually know how they'll turn out. And the ones in Pompeii are more engaging than those of any superhero movie I saw last year ... Meanwhile, the disaster renders the villains even pettier, and the devoted lovers even more romantic. That is all as it should be. From Bulwer-Lytton to Leone, the Pompeii story has never not been schlock: It ain't the Bible, and it ain't Homer. In this gorgeous, silly, exciting new version, it finds its level. Pompeii 3-D wants merely to entertain. And it does, proudly.

Harington later joked on Saturday Night Live about the film's reception, remarking that the movie was "more of a disaster than the event it was based on."

=== Accolades ===
Award	Date of ceremony	Category	Recipient(s)	Result	Ref(s)
Golden Raspberry Awards	February 21, 2015	Worst Supporting Actor	Kiefer Sutherland	Nominated	
Canadian Screen Awards	March 1, 2015	Best Art Direction/Production Design	Paul Denham Austerberry, Nigel Churcher	Won	
Canadian Screen Awards	March 1, 2015	Best Costume Design	Wendy Partridge	Won	
Canadian Screen Awards	March 1, 2015	Best Overall Sound	Greg Chapman, Peter Persaud, Andrew Stirk, Andrew Tay, Mark Zsifkovits	Won	
Canadian Screen Awards	March 1, 2015	Best Sound Editing	Steve Baine, Kevin Banks, Stephen Barden, Fred Brennan, Alex Bullick, J.R. Fountain, Kevin Howard, Jill Purdy	Won	
Canadian Screen Awards	March 1, 2015	Best Visual Effects	Keith Acheson, Dennis Berardi, Ayo Burgess, Naomi Foakes, Jo Hughes, Chris MacLean, Mohsen Mousavi, Scott Riopelle, Andy Robinson, Eric Robinson	Won	
Canadian Screen Awards	March 1, 2015	Golden Screen Award	Pompeii	Won	

=== Home media ===
Pompeii was released on DVD and Blu-ray on May 20, 2014, by Sony Pictures Home Entertainment.

== Historical accuracy ==
Pompeii was generally praised, albeit with some hesitation, for its recreation of historic set pieces and portrayal of accounts of recorded events and geological realism, although aspects of the eruption of the volcano were considered enhanced or heightened for dramatic spectacle.

The film relies for its reconstruction of historical events on two letters from Pliny the Younger to the Roman historian Tacitus. It opens with the quotation from Pliny:

You could hear the shrieks of women, the wailing of infants, and the shouting of men; some were calling their parents, others their children or their wives, trying to recognize them by their voices. People bewailed their own fate or that of their relatives, and there were some who prayed for death in their terror of dying. Many besought the aid of the gods, but still more imagined there were no gods left, and that the universe was plunged into eternal darkness for evermore.

Anderson became enamored of his writings, particularly their near fantastical element and their eloquence, whose influence can be seen throughout the film in the destruction of Pompeii.

The depiction of the eruption is based on eruptions which occurred all over the world over the last ten years. Anderson cites the volcanic eruption of Mount Etna in Italy and various eruptions of Japanese volcanoes as specific examples of volcanic eruptions which the production crew observed through footage which has been captured on film.

Anderson also wanted to portray the lightning that is often seen in the ash cloud above eruptions, as he had never seen it portrayed before, and he felt it was both magnificent and very terrifying. The animation team was so concerned with realism in the eruption that they would always have real photographs and footage of real eruptions visible to them on separate screens as they put together the eruption of Mount Vesuvius for the film.

Rosaly Lopes, a volcanologist at NASA's Jet Propulsion Laboratory in Pasadena, California, supported Anderson's work, stating that the film "realistically captured the earthquakes that preceded the eruption, the explosions and the pyroclastic flows of hot ash and gas that buried the city and its residents."

The depiction of the city was based on the surviving ruins of Pompeii. To ensure complete accuracy, any shots of the ancient city were built upon existing footage of the ruins. Anderson stated,

we would do a real helicopter shot over the ruins of the city so that we knew we were getting the layout of the city correct ... Then we would project a computer-generated image over the top of the real photography ... That is how we got the architecture of the city precise.

Sarah Yeomans, an archaeologist at USC, has praised the attention to detail in the film's depiction of Pompeii, noting, for example, the raised paving stones in the streets, the political graffiti on the buildings, and the amphitheatre where gladiatorial combat takes place.

Anderson has described other aspects of the film as being less rigorously historical. For example, he states that the timeframe of the events was compacted in order to keep the intensity levels high. His portrayal of some aspects of the eruption, in particular the inclusion of fireballs raining from the sky, were included for dramatic effect rather than historical accuracy.

Anderson received minor criticism from Yeomans for his portrayal of women, who would not have been seen alone in town, involved in political affairs, or wearing revealing clothes such as they wore in the film. Anderson portrayed these women more according to modern tastes. The characters themselves are fictional. Anderson found inspiration for them in real people, representing the famous plaster cast of the "twin lovers" of Pompeii as Milo and Cassia, and finding inspiration for Atticus in the casts of the cowering man. Anderson said he received approval from every volcanologist and historian he has shown the movie to, having received "high marks for both scientific and historical accuracy", for which the team was striving.

== See also ==
- List of films featuring slavery
