= Robert Kulzer =

German film producer

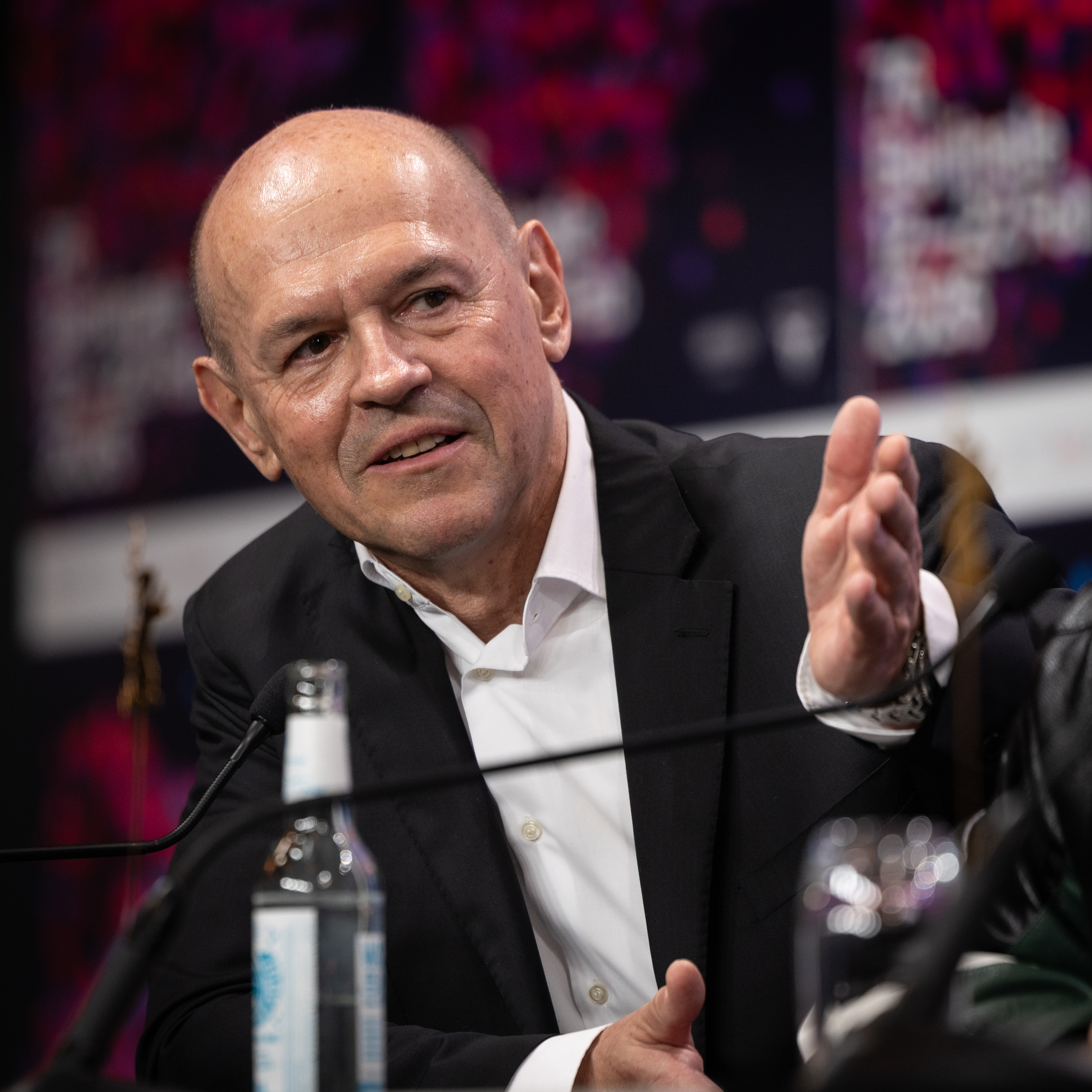
Robert Kulzer at the Berlin Film Festival 2026

Robert Kulzer is a German film producer, who primarily works with Constantin Film.

== Career ==
Kulzer is known as the German company's liaison to the Hollywood-based US film industry, beginning with the firm as a script reader and assistant for Bernd Eichinger. He has overseen the company's Resident Evil franchise, with reboots coming for the aforementioned and Wrong Turn.

== Filmography ==
=== Film ===
- Manta, Manta, (1991)
- A Girl Called Rosemary, (1996, executive)
- Teenage Wolfpack, (1996, executive)
- Charley's Aunt, (1996, executive)
- It Happened in Broad Daylight, (1997, executive)
- Prince Valiant, (1997, executive)
- Wrongfully Accused, (1998, executive)
- The Calling, (2000, executive)
- Resident Evil, (2002, executive)
- Wrong Turn, (2003)
- A2 Racer, (2004)
- Resident Evil: Apocalypse, (2004, executive)
- The Dark, (2005)
- Skinwalkers, (2006, executive)
- DOA: Dead or Alive, (2006)
- Wrong Turn 2: Dead End, (2007, executive)
- Resident Evil: Extinction, (2007)
- Pandorum, (2009)
- Wrong Turn 3: Left for Dead, (2009, executive)
- Resident Evil: Afterlife, (2010)
- The Three Musketeers, (2011)
- Wrong Turn 4: Bloody Beginnings, (2011, executive)
- Resident Evil: Retribution, (2012)
- Wrong Turn 5: Bloodlines, (2012; executive)
- The Mortal Instruments: City of Bones, (2013)
- Tarzan, (2013)
- Pompeii, (2014)
- Love, Rosie, (2014)
- Wrong Turn 6: Last Resort, (2014; executive)
- Fantastic Four, (2015)
- Resident Evil: The Final Chapter, (2016)
- Polar, (2019)
- The Silence, (2019)
- Black Beauty, (2020)
- Monster Hunter, (2020)
- Wrong Turn, (2021)
- Resident Evil: Welcome to Raccoon City, (2021)
- In the Lost Lands (2025)
- The Fantastic Four: First Steps, (2025; executive)
- Regretting You, (2025)
- Good Luck, Have Fun, Don't Die, (2026)
- Psycho Killer , (2026; executive)
- Resident Evil (2026)
- Beware Boiúna (2026)

=== Television ===
Kulzer is an executive producer on all shows

- Shadowhunters, (2019)
- Agatha All Along (2024)
- Ironheart (2025)
