= Rola (model) =

Japanese model, actress and singer (born 1990)

- ローラ
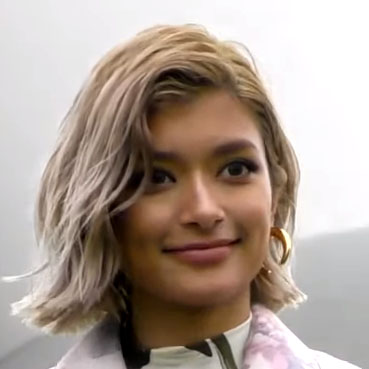
- Born: Eri Sato (佐藤えり); March 30, 1990 (age 36); Tokyo, Japan
- Citizenship: Japanese
- Occupations: Model; Television personality; actress; singer
- Employer: Libera Production (until 2020)
- Height: 165 cm (65 in)

Rola (ローラ, Rōra; born Eri Sato (佐藤えり, Sato Eri) on March 30, 1990) is a Japanese-born fashion model, TV personality, actress and singer of Japanese, Russian and Bangladeshi descent. As a model, she is known for her regular appearances in the Japanese fashion magazine Vivi and in numerous commercials. Since 2011, Rola has also become widely known as a tarento (TV personality) appearing on Japanese television regularly and has one of the largest social media followings of any Japanese celebrity. Rola was previously represented by the management agency Libera in Japan.

== Early life and education ==
Rola was born in Tokyo, Japan. Her biological mother is Japanese with a quarter Russian heritage and her father is Bangladeshi. She moved to Bangladesh at the age of one where she attended an American international school. At the age of nine, she returned to Japan after her parents were divorced, then she was primarily raised by her step-mother, who is Chinese. She has a twin brother, Ryo, with whom she is said to get along well, and has a younger half-brother and half-sister who are twins. She and her brother were raised as Muslims by their father, but he allowed them to eat pork due to its prevalence in Japanese culture.

== Personal life ==
Her father, Jurip, was arrested on July 26, 2014, after turning himself in at a police station in Suginami Ward, Tokyo. He had been put on Interpol's wanted list a year earlier for scamming and defrauding Japan's national health insurance system.

== Activism ==
Rola has become an outspoken advocate for environmentalism and animal welfare on her social media, where she has posted about plant-forward diets, preserving wildlife reserves, and adopting rather than shopping for companion animals. She has also been a pescatarian since 2019.

== Career ==
Rola's modelling career began when she was a high school student after being approached by a scout while walking down the street in Shibuya, Tokyo.

=== In modelling ===
After making several appearances in the Japan's Popteen magazine, Rola began appearing in the fashion magazine Vivi in 2008. She has since been active in runway modeling, making numerous appearances in shows such as Tokyo Girls Collection, Shibuya Girls Collection, and Girls Award.

Rola's first appearance on the cover of Vivi magazine was the August 2012 edition, and her first fashion book, "The Rola!!", was published the same month. An additional fashion book, Rola's Closet, was released in June 2014 and contains photographs taken by Rola on the photograph-sharing service instagram.

In August 2014, she began modelling for the fashion brand Beams, making her first appearance in the brand's 2014 autumn/winter catalogue.

Rola has appeared in the following runway shows: Kobe Collection (2008) and Tokyo Girls Collection (2009 Autumn/Winter).

=== As a TV personality ===
Rola's career as a tarento (a television personality in Japan) began in June 2010 when she made her first appearance on Nihon TV's variety show Shabekuri 007 alongside fellow models Lena Fujii and Mitsuki Oishi. Rola was named the number four "rising TV-star in 2011", with 200 appearances on Japanese TV shows. She appeared as a weekly regular on Fuji TV's Waratte Iitomo! variety show from April 2012 until the program ended in March 2014.

Rola's television persona comprises distinctive characteristics, exuding an overall childlike naiveté, innocence, and playfulness. Signature affectations such as puffing her cheeks in embarrassment, holding an "OK" hand gesture over her cheek, and curling her tongue over her upper lip make Rola a common subject for Japanese impersonators, who also mimic her ditzy responses and constant giggles. She falls within the model-idol category of Japanese "talent" (tarento) as not actually possessing any particular talent, but Rola also presents comic possibilities by her mere presence. In the wake of Rola's popularity, aspiring talent Arie Mizusawa began appearing on Japanese television sporting cute affectations nearly identical to Rola, to an extent that entertainment media referred to Mizusawa as "Rola 2" and both she and Rola as "twins".

In April 2014, Rola acquired her first presenting role on the Fuji TV quiz show Danketsu Seyo Quiz 30 in which she presents alongside veteran TV presenter and comedian Atsushi Tamura.

In 2017, there were reports that she may be locked into a ten-year "slave-like" contract with her talent agency.

=== Music ===
In October 2011, Rola made her musical debut as a featured vocalist on Issa (of Da Pump) and SoulJa's song "I hate u". She made her solo debut in July 2012 with the song "Memories", the theme song for the Pokémon anime film Kyurem vs. the Sacred Swordsman: Keldeo, in which she also has a cameo voice appearance. It peaked at number 14 on the Oricon Chart in its first week of release. In September 2012, Rola met with Canadian singer Carly Rae Jepsen in Tokyo following her own lip-dub version of Jepsen's hit "Call Me Maybe", and expressed her intention to master English in order to broaden her horizons.

=== Twitter ===
Rola joined the social media site Twitter on February 29, 2012. After three days, she gained over 190,000 followers. After two weeks, the number had risen to over 430,000, the largest number amongst Japanese models, followed by Tsubasa Masuwaka and Kyary Pamyu Pamyu. It reached over 670,000 by April 13, 2012, and 1,000,000 in October 2012. In June 2014, she became the fourth Japanese celebrity to exceed two million followers. As of February 2020, she has the third highest number of followers (over 4.2 million) for a Japanese celebrity, second amongst Japanese female celebrities.

=== Personal brand ===
In 2013, Rola launched a brand of fragrances called "Vasilisa". She has two perfumes, and five body mists.

=== Acting ===
Rola played the role of the female soldier Cobalt in the 2016 feature film Resident Evil: The Final Chapter.

=== Advertising work ===
In 2009, as an exclusive Vivi model, she became the model for "Vivifleurs" women's suits following a joint enterprise between Vivi and Haruyama Trading Co., Ltd.. In 2011, along with Mizuki Yamamoto, Yuri Ebihara, Jessica Michibata, Tomomi Itano, Hazuki Tsuchiya and Taylor Momsen, Rola became a model for the fashion label Samantha Thavasa, appearing in television commercials and catalogues. Modeling for the cosmetics brand Brigitte in January 2012, Rola appeared in television commercials, which targets the early-twenties market. That April, Rola also signed a contract with Fujiya Co., appearing alongside the brand's mascot "Peko-chan"; a new brand of sweets featuring Rola on the packaging was released by the company in September of that year. Mail-order retailer for young women's lingerie Peach John was represented by Rola in May 2012, where she appeared on the front cover of the brand's catalogue. As of August 2014, she continues to represent the brand in television commercials. In August 2012, Rola represented the takoyaki restaurant chain HotLand corporation appearing in television commercials and on posters for the company. In 2013, Rola appeared on television commercials for: beauty-products specialists "Tsuyamote Beauty", foot care brand Dr. Scholl's, soft drinks company "Momo no Ten-nensui" and Mitsui Outlet Park. Alongside Girolamo Panzetta, Rola also appeared in a television commercial for day spa company TBC.

In 2014, she featured in another commercial for TBC and an advertisement for the mobile news application "Antenna". Rola was announced as the image character for Bandai's handheld digital pet, Tamagotchi 4U, in July 2014. A limited-edition "pet" based on Rola herself was released in September 2014.

In December 2014, it was revealed that Rola had advertising contracts with fifteen companies, more than any other Japanese celebrity in 2014. In 2015, Rola appeared in 11 commercials, all of which were for different companies. She came in third for appearing in the most number of commercials for the year. She regained the top position in 2017, with Rola having commercial contracts with fifteen companies, overtaking actress-model Suzu Hirose (fourteen contracts).

=== Publications ===
On August 23, 2012, Rola released her first fashion book, called The Rola.

On June 26, 2014, Rola released her second fashion book, called Rola's Closet.

On November 30, 2015, Rola released her first recipe book, called Rola's Kitchen.

== Filmography ==
2016 – Resident Evil: The Final Chapter as soldier COBALT.

2020 - Followers as Herself

== Awards ==
=== 2012 ===
- 29th Japan Jeans Conventions Best "Jeanist" Awards: Elected by Committee Category
- 17th Japan Nailist Association Nail Queen Awards: Tarento Category

=== 2013 ===
- 10th "The Best of Beauty Awards": Twenties Category
- 30th Japan Jeans Conventions Best "Jeanist" Awards: Elected by General Public Category

=== 2014 ===
- 31st Japan Jeans Conventions Best "Jeanist" Awards: Elected by General Public Category
- 19th Japan Nailist Association Nail Queen Awards: Tarento Category

=== 2015 ===
- Cookpad Award 2015: Best Cook
