= In the Lost Lands =

2025 epic dark fantasy film directed by Paul W. S. Anderson

- Theatrical release poster
- Directed by: Paul W. S. Anderson
- Screenplay by: Constantin Werner
- Story by: Paul W. S. Anderson; Constantin Werner
- Based on: "In the Lost Lands" by George R. R. Martin
- Produced by: Jeremy Bolt; Paul W. S. Anderson; Milla Jovovich; Dave Bautista; Constantin Werner; Jonathan Meisner; Robert Kulzer
- Starring: Dave Bautista; Milla Jovovich; Arly Jover
- Cinematography: Glen MacPherson
- Edited by: Niven Howie
- Music by: Paul Haslinger
- Production companies: Constantin Film; Spark Productions; FilmNation Entertainment; Dream Bros. Entertainment; Rusalka Film
- Distributed by: Vertical (United States); Constantin Film Verleih (Germany); Praesens-Film (Switzerland)
- Release dates: February 27, 2025 (Australia); March 6, 2025 (Germany and Switzerland); March 7, 2025 (United States)
- Running time: 101 minutes
- Countries: Germany; Switzerland; United States
- Language: English
- Budget: $55 million
- Box office: $6.5 million

In the Lost Lands is a 2025 post-apocalyptic action fantasy film directed by Paul W. S. Anderson, with a screenplay by Constantin Werner from a story they co-wrote. Based on the short story of the same name by George R. R. Martin, the film stars Milla Jovovich and Dave Bautista as a witch and a hunter, respectively, who journey into a dangerous landscape to find an artifact for a queen.

In the Lost Lands was first released in Australia on February 27, 2025, and was released on March 6, 2025 by Constantin Film Verleih in Germany and Praesens-Film in Switzerland, and in the United States on March 7, 2025, by Vertical in North American territories.

== Plot ==
Earth has become an uncivilized wasteland called the Lost Lands. In the "City in the Mountains", ruled by an ailing, old man known as the Overlord, order is forcibly maintained by the Church. Witch Gray Alys is being hanged, on the orders of a woman known as the Enforcer and her followers from the Church. Aided by her powers of illusion, Alys escapes her fate, humilliating the Enforcer in front of the lower classes in the process. Furious, the Enforcer leads a group of men in pursuit of Alys.

The Queen, wife of the Overlord, and the head of the Overwatch, Jerais, visit Alys's lair. The Queen needs a werewolf's power by next week's full moon; Alys is tasked with killing the beast and bringing its power to the Queen. Alys, who does not refuse requests from anyone, accepts the job. Later, Jerais, who is in love with and worried about the Queen, secretly pays Alys to fail at her task. Alys uses her powers to find a shapeshifter by entering its mind. The creature is known as Sardor, meaning "Grey Wolf".

Under the pretext of needing a "hunter" in her quest, Alys hires Boyce, the Queen's lover. Alys and Boyce begin their expedition into the Lost Lands, where Boyce encounters his old friends Ross and Mara. Boyce has sex with Mara before continuing his quest with Alys. The Enforcer captures and tortures Ross and Mara, seeking information about Alys and Boyce. There, the Enforcer learns that the duo is supposed to go to Skull River, Sardor's lair. She murders Ross and kidnaps Mara instead.

Boyce and Alys search for his friend Cyrus, but discover he has been hanged by the Church. Boyce and Alys locate the Enforcer and her goons, but they have shielded their eyes to block Alys' powers. The Enforcer kills Mara to further torment Boyce. He and Alys are attacked by the Church's men, leading to a gunfight and a chase to an air tram where most of the goons are thrown to their deaths. The Enforcer orders the cable cut, and shoots Boyce, but Alys uses her powers through a sniper lens to save him and escape.

Alys and Boyce face ghoul-like monsters while traveling. Trapped in a ring of fire for protection, the group faces a monster leader who knows Alys and disapproves of her return. She uses illusions to make the monsters believe that they are on fire. After this encounter, Boyce tries to convince her not to continue the quest, to no avail. Alys gives signs of having a death wish.

The Queen kills the Overlord, disclosing she is carrying Boyce's baby. She later seduces Jerais and convinces him to kill the Patriarch, the power-hungry leader of the Church. During a confrontation with Alys and Boyce, the Enforcer and her crew die.

Alys and Boyce eventually reach Skull River, where he is revealed to be Sardor. Under the light of the full moon, Boyce turns into a wolf. Alys defeats Boyce using silver claws, rendering him unable to continue. Boyce turns back to human. Alys then admits she knew he was a shapeshifter and previously poisoned him with silver. Before dying, Boyce asks her to live with him for the rest of their days. Alys, who cannot refuse requests from anyone, accepts, kills Boyce, skins the body, and then buries the remains.

Alys brings Boyce's pelt to the Queen. Jerais claims Alys failed him, but she tells him that she gave him what he truly desired, which was the Queen. The Queen knew all along that Boyce was a shapeshifter, hence the reason why she wanted to become one; enraged, she accuses Jerais of plotting to kill Boyce and kills him. The Lost Lands are in rebellion after the Overlord's death and the Church's fall. The Queen flees as Boyce's fur burns under the sun. Boyce rises from his grave, resurrected, and seeks out Alys with the intention of killing her. She believed in his return from the dead as strongly as she believed in the coming rebellion. Boyce and Alys team up to survive and hunt in the Lost Lands.

== Cast ==
- Dave Bautista as Boyce
- Milla Jovovich as Gray Alys
- Arly Jover as Ash, "The Enforcer"
- Amara Okereke as Melange
- Fraser James as Patriarch Johan
- Simon Lööf as Jerais
- Deirdre Mullins as Mara
- Sebastian Stankiewicz as Ross
- Jacek Dzisiewicz as "Overlord"
- Tue Lunding as "The Hammer"
- Ian Hanmore as The Stranger
- Eveline Hall as Old Homeless Woman
- Kamila Klamut as Midwife
- Caoilinn Springall as Young Girl
- Pawel Wysocki as The Gambler
- Jan Kowalewski as Young Monk
- Tomasz Cymerman as Outrider
- Nicolas Stone as Kane

== Production ==
=== Development ===
In February 2015, it was announced that German filmmaker Constantin Werner would write and direct a film based on three George R. R. Martin short stories he had previously optioned: "The Lonely Songs of Laren Dorr", "In the Lost Lands", and "Bitterblooms". Werner planned to adapt all three stories into a single film with Milla Jovovich playing Gray Alys, and Justin Chatwin playing Boyce. This version of the film never happened and the project entered limbo.

In 2021, the film re-emerged with Paul W. S. Anderson as director, Jovovich's husband who collaborated on the Resident Evil film series, The Three Musketeers (2011), and Monster Hunter (2020). Dave Bautista replaced Chatwin as Boyce, while Werner served as co-writer and producer. According to Werner, the film was planned to begin filming in late 2021 or early 2022, but was delayed to late 2022. In an August 2022 interview prior to filming, Anderson described the film as a "Western", saying:

At its heart, it's very much a western as it has all the iconography that one would associate with a western. It's set in a post-apocalyptic land, so on the surface it's not a western, but at its heart it is most definitely a western. It deals with a lot of western tropes and storytelling and imagery, so I am very excited to be doing that.

=== Filming ===
Principal photography began 14 November 2022 at Alvernia Studios in Poland. Photography wrapped in February 2023, after 46 days.

=== Visual effects ===
The visual effects were provided by Herne Hill Media, led by Dennis Berardi, who had previously worked on Anderson's Resident Evil films and Monster Hunter.

=== Post-production ===
In February 2023, Martin indicated on Twitter that filming had concluded in Poland and was undergoing extensive post-production.

== Release ==
In September 2024, Vertical acquired the U.S. distribution rights to the film. In November 2024, Martin revealed the film's American release date as February 28, 2025. In January 8, 2025, the film was delayed to March 7 the same year.

The German release date for In the Lost Lands was initially set for September 26, 2024, before being replaced on Constantin Film's slate by Megalopolis.

== Reception ==
=== Box office ===
In the Lost Lands grossed $1.9 million in the United States and Canada, and $4.7 million in other territories, for a worldwide total of $6.5 million. Therefore, the movie was a box-office bomb with its reported $55 million budget.

In its opening weekend, the film made $1.1 million from 1,370 theaters.

=== Critical response ===
On the review aggregator website Rotten Tomatoes, 24% of 76 critics' reviews are positive, with an average rating of 4/10. The website's consensus reads: "Squandering George R.R. Martin's source material on an incomprehensible eyesore, Paul W.S. Anderson's In the Lost Lands could use its own map out of the wilderness." Metacritic, which uses a weighted average, assigned the film a score of 41 out of 100, based on 17 critics, indicating "mixed or average" reviews.

Amon Warmann of Empire and Peter Bradshaw of The Guardian both gave the film 2/5, with Warmann writing: "Neither Bautista nor Jovovich can elevate this ugly-looking misfire. Fans of entertaining fantasy action need not apply...", while Bradshaw described the film as a "George RR Martin story flabbily retold in a dreary postapocalypse where Milla Jovovich has few spells to cast as a witch for hire."

David Ehrlich of IndieWire wrote: "This eyesore of a film is so ugly and confusing to look at it that its fable-like story — incoherent even by Anderson’s standards — never has even the slightest chance to overcome how difficult it is to see".

Nick Schager of The Daily Beast gave a more positive review, calling the film "A Beautifully Bonkers B-Movie About Witches and Werewolves".

=== Accolades ===
Accolades received by In the Lost Lands
Award	Date of ceremony	Category	Recipient(s)	Result	Ref.
Golden Raspberry Awards	March 14, 2026	Worst Actor	Dave Bautista	Nominated	
Golden Raspberry Awards	March 14, 2026	Worst Actress	Milla Jovovich	Nominated	
