= Jeremy Bolt =

British film producer

- Born: Jeremy Richard Gordon Bolt; 25 October 1965 (age 61); Uganda
- Citizenship: United Kingdom
- Occupation: Film producer
- Years active: 1992–present
- Spouse: Anoja Dias (m. 2010)

Jeremy Richard Gordon Bolt (born 25 October 1965) is a British film producer. After co-founding Impact Pictures with Paul W. S. Anderson in 1992, Bolt has produced the majority of Anderson's films. He is most well-known for producing the Resident Evil series and Death Race.

As well as producing big budget genre movies, Bolt also produced the art house film Vigo for Film Four (directed by Julien Temple), and the comedy Stiff Upper Lips (starring Peter Ustinov). He has also produced There’s Only One Jimmy Grimble (starring Ray Winstone and Robert Carlyle), and teen horror The Hole (starring Thora Birch and Keira Knightley), both for Pathe Pictures.

== Biography ==
Jeremy Richard Gordon Bolt was born on 25 October 1965, in Uganda. He was educated at Edge Grove School, a boys' preparatory independent school in the village of Aldenham in Hertfordshire in Southern England, and then Wellington College. He later became a British citizen.

Bolt and Anderson's first collaboration, 1994's Shopping starring Jude Law (Channel Four Films), was a film about joyriding and ram-raiding British youth that revved up Bolt's career and established his love of cars and death defying races. Having attracted interest from Hollywood, Bolt produced big budget films such as Event Horizon (Paramount Pictures) and Soldier (Warner Bros.). 2002's Resident Evil (Constantin Film) was the first movie under Impact Pictures' joint venture deal with Constantin Film, going on to gross over $100M worldwide.

Under a joint venture with Constantin, Bolt has also produced 2004's Resident Evil: Apocalypse (written by Anderson and directed by Alexander Witt), the psychological horror The Dark (directed by John Fawcett), teen actioner DOA: Dead or Alive (directed by Cory Yuen for Dimension Films), an adaptation of Tecmo’s best-selling video game franchise, and the third movie in the Resident Evil franchise, 2007’s Resident Evil: Extinction debuted at #1 in the US box office and grossed $150M worldwide. In 2008, Bolt produced Death Race with Jason Statham, Joan Allen and Ian McShane, a reimagining of the Roger Corman classic, with Cruise/Wagner Productions for Universal Pictures. Fall 2009 saw the release of the science fiction horror film Pandorum for Overture Films and Constantin Film starring Dennis Quaid & Ben Foster. The fourth film in the Resident Evil franchise was released in autumn 2010 and grossed $300M worldwide. Action horror Resident Evil: Afterlife was shot in 3D for Constantin Film, and stars Milla Jovovich and Ali Larter.

The Three Musketeers was released in autumn 2011, which Paul W. S. Anderson directed for Constantin Film and Summit Entertainment. The film, shot in 3D, starred Orlando Bloom, Milla Jovovich, and Logan Lerman and was the No. 1 movie in Germany and Japan. It grossed approximately $150M worldwide. The fifth film in the Resident Evil franchise began production in October 2011 with Paul W. S. Anderson directing for Constantin Film. Resident Evil: Retribution was released in September 2012. Resident Evil: Retribution grossed $220M worldwide.

Bolt produced Pompeii (2014), a love story set against the backdrop of the eruption of Mt Vesuvius in 79 A. D., which Paul W. S. Anderson directed in 3D for Summit Entertainment and Constantin Film. Resident Evil: The Final Chapter, the last film in Anderson's Resident Evil series was released worldwide in early 2017, with an early release in Japan in late 2016. This was the highest grossing film of the franchise, bringing the Resident Evil theatrical franchise total to over $1.25 Billion. Bolt produced Polar for Netflix starring Mads Mikkelsen, Vanessa Hudgens and Katheryn Winnick. Most recently, Bolt produced Monster Hunter, based on Capcom's worldwide best selling game, for Constantin Film, Sony, Toho and Ten Cent. The film was directed by Paul W.S. Anderson and stars Milla Jovovich, Tony Jaa, Ron Perlman, T.I., and Megan Goode.

Next up, Bolt is producing Titanoboa, Danger Girl (directed by Jeff Wadlow) and Black Beauty for Constantin Film.

== Films produced ==
- Shopping (1994)
- Turn of the Screw (1994)
- Event Horizon (1997)
- Vigo (1998)
- Stiff Upper Lips (1998)
- Soldier (1998)
- There's Only One Jimmy Grimble (2000)
- The Hole (2001)
- Resident Evil (2002)
- Resident Evil: Apocalypse (2004)
- The Dark (2005)
- DOA: Dead or Alive (2006)
- Resident Evil: Extinction (2007)
- Death Race (2008)
- Pandorum (2009)
- Resident Evil: Afterlife (2010)
- Death Race 2 (2010)
- The Three Musketeers (2011)
- Resident Evil: Retribution (2012)
- Death Race 3: Inferno (2013)
- Pompeii (2014)
- Resident Evil: The Final Chapter (2016)
- Death Race: Beyond Anarchy (2018)
- Polar (2019)
- Monster Hunter (2020)
- Black Beauty (2020)
- Resident Evil: Welcome to Raccoon City (2021)
- In the Lost Lands (2025)
- Desert Warrior (2025)
- Beware Boiúna (2026)
