= Stiff Upper Lips =

- Directed by: Gary Sinyor
- Written by: Paul Simpkin and Gary Sinyor
- Produced by: Nigel Savage; Babs Thomas; Stephen Margolis; Keith Richardson; Bobby Bedi; Ricky Posner; Nigel Savage
- Starring: Sean Pertwee; Georgina Cates; Prunella Scales; Peter Ustinov; Samuel West; Frank Finlay; Brian Glover; Robert Portal
- Edited by: Peter Hollywood
- Music by: David Hughes; John Murphy
- Production companies: Impact Pictures; Yorkshire Television; Isle of Man Film
- Distributed by: Metrodome
- Release dates: February 1997 (AFM); November 1997 (BFI London Film Festival); June 12, 1998 (United Kingdom); August 27, 1999 (United States)
- Country: United Kingdom
- Language: English
- Box office: £203,000 (UK)

Stiff Upper Lips is a 1997 film directed by Gary Sinyor and starring Sean Pertwee, Georgina Cates, Robert Portal, Samuel West, Prunella Scales, Peter Ustinov, and Brian Glover in his final film role. It is a broad parody of British period films, especially the lavish Merchant Ivory productions of the 1980s and early 1990s. Although it specifically targets A Room with a View, Chariots of Fire, Maurice, A Passage to India, and many other films, in a more general way Stiff Upper Lips satirises popular perceptions of certain Edwardian traits: propriety, sexual repression, xenophobia, and class snobbery. It was filmed on location in Italy, India, and on the Isle of Man.

== Plot ==
England, 1908: Emily Ivory (Cates) is a wealthy young woman who lives with her Aunt Agnes (Scales) at Ivory's End, a large country house. At 22, as her aunt constantly reminds her, she is verging on spinsterhood. She meets her brother's best friend, Cedric Trilling (Portal), when the two come home from university. Aunt Agnes wants the two to fall in love: Cedric, however, is a pompous bore who is overly fond of quoting Homer on all sorts of not-quite-appropriate occasions; he is also a repressed homosexual. When Emily's aunt sees the sparks failing to fly, she whisks everyone off to Italy, then India, hoping the romantic locations will bring on love.

Emily's eye, however, soon wanders to the family's new manservant, George (Pertwee), a sturdy peasant who, earlier in the film, had the effrontery to fling off all his clothes and save her life when she was drowning in a pond. Now, Emily can't seem to forget his tall, manly frame and his "ripping set of unmentionables." (George, a sort of Heathcliff/Gamekeeper/Working Class Hero hybrid, has a peculiar way of entering a room; he rushes in, slides to a stop in the middle of the floor with eyes blazing and one shoulder forward, and tosses his cap aside).

With George, Emily achieves carnal fulfillment, true love, and, eventually, motherhood and marriage. Although the upper-class characters disapprove of the alliance, nobody is more scandalised than George's father, who keeps reminding his son that he's "the scum of the earth." When Emily becomes pregnant, she suggests giving the child to George's father; George, appalled, begs her to sell it to pirates, abandon it on a mountain, or let it be raised by wolves instead.

Cedric, too, finds love with Edward (West), Emily's handsome, cheerful twit of a brother. In that era, it was "the love that dare not speak its name"; however, during Emily's wedding scene, Edward takes Cedric's arm and shouts "WE LOVE EACH OTHER!" in church. Even Aunt Agnes meets someone special - an expatriate Englishman (Ustinov) who owns a tea plantation in India. At the end of the film, despite class differences, sexual taboos, and age prejudice, everyone seems likely to lead happy, sexually fulfilled lives ever after.

== Cast ==
- Peter Ustinov ...Horace
- Prunella Scales ...Aunt Agnes
- Georgina Cates ...Emily
- Samuel West ...Edward
- Robert Portal ...Cedric
- Sean Pertwee ...George
- Brian Glover ...Eric
- Frank Finlay ...Hudson Junior
- Richard Braine ...Mr. Tweeb
- David Ashton ...Dr Henry

== Critical reception ==
Stiff Upper Lips received mixed reviews. Alexander Walker of the Evening Standard called it "A Spot of Spiffing Spoofery" while the Time Out reviewer said "it is beautifully acted and consistently spot on". Stephen Holden of The New York Times, however, lamented "If only it were funnier". Gaby Wood of' The Guardian ' called it 'Terrible, even as pastiche'.
