= The Three Musketeers (2011 film) =

Action-adventure film by Paul W. S. Anderson

- Promotional film poster
- Directed by: Paul W. S. Anderson
- Written by: Alex Litvak; Andrew Davies
- Based on: The Three Musketeers by Alexandre Dumas
- Produced by: Paul W. S. Anderson; Jeremy Bolt; Robert Kulzer
- Starring: Logan Lerman; Milla Jovovich; Matthew Macfadyen; Ray Stevenson; Luke Evans; Mads Mikkelsen; Gabriella Wilde; James Corden; Juno Temple; Freddie Fox; Orlando Bloom; Christoph Waltz
- Cinematography: Glen MacPherson
- Edited by: Alexander Berner
- Music by: Paul Haslinger
- Production companies: Summit Entertainment; Impact Pictures; Constantin Film; NEF Productions; New Legacy Film
- Distributed by: E1 Entertainment (United Kingdom); Constantin Film Verleih (Germany); UGC Distribution (France); Summit Entertainment (United States)
- Release dates: 1 September 2011 (Germany); 12 October 2011 (France/U.K.)
- Running time: 110 minutes
- Countries: United Kingdom; Germany; France; United States
- Language: English
- Budget: $75 million
- Box office: $132.3 million

The Three Musketeers is a 2011 period action-adventure film directed by Paul W. S. Anderson. It stars Matthew Macfadyen, Logan Lerman, Ray Stevenson, Milla Jovovich, Luke Evans, Mads Mikkelsen, Orlando Bloom, and Christoph Waltz. It is based on Alexandre Dumas's 1844 novel with clock-punk elements.

The film was released on 1 September 2011 in Germany, 12 October in the United Kingdom and France and 21 October in the United States. It grossed $132 million against a production budget of $75 million and received negative critical reviews, with criticism of its writing, direction, and characters, although its action sequences, score, the performances of Macfadyen and Mikkelsen, and its visual style received general praise.

== Plot ==
In Venice, the musketeers Athos, Porthos, and Aramis, with the help of Milady de Winter, steal airship schematics made by Leonardo da Vinci. However, they are betrayed by Milady, who incapacitates them and sells the blueprints to the Duke of Buckingham.

A year later, D'Artagnan leaves his village in Gascony for Paris in hopes of becoming a musketeer as his father was, only to learn that they were disbanded. At a rural bar, he challenges Captain Rochefort, leader of Cardinal Richelieu's guard, to a duel after being insulted by him, but Rochefort merely shoots him while he is distracted. Once in Paris, D'Artagnan separately encounters Athos, Porthos, and Aramis and, accidentally offending all three, schedules separate duels with each. Athos brings Porthos and Aramis to the duel as his seconds, causing D'Artagnan to realize their true identities. Richelieu's guards arrive to apprehend them, but, inspired by D'Artagnan, the musketeers fight together and win. All four are summoned before the young King Louis XIII and Richelieu urges him to execute them, but Queen Anne is impressed by their bravery and the king decorates them instead.

Richelieu instructs Milady, now his accomplice, to plant false love letters among Queen Anne's possessions, and steal her diamond necklace, and take it to the Tower of London in order to frame her as having an affair with Buckingham, which would force King Louis to execute her and declare war on England. By this point, the people would demand a more experienced leader: Richelieu himself. In order to secure her own position, Milady demands that Richelieu declare in written authorization that she is working on behalf of France.

The false letters are found and given to King Louis, who is advised by Richelieu to set up a ball at which Queen Anne would be forced to wear the necklace. If she does not, then it will be believed her affair is real, and there will be war. Queen Anne's lady-in-waiting Constance Bonacieux discovers Richelieu's plan and pleads with the musketeers to stop him. They follow Milady and Buckingham to London, while Constance is captured by Rochefort for helping the musketeers to escape from him.

In London, Milady tells Buckingham the musketeers have arrived to take revenge on him and exposes to him all their tendencies in battle. D'Artagnan is captured, but he is in fact acting as a decoy following the plan Milady would have expected the Musketeers to follow, allowing his associates to hijack Buckingham's airship and rescue him. Milady's getaway coachman reveals himself as the musketeers' manservant Planchet and delivers her to his masters, who retrieve the necklace from her. Athos prepares to execute Milady for her treachery but is hesitant, and she leaps off the airship, seemingly dying on her own terms.

The musketeers depart back to Paris, only to be intercepted by Rochefort in a much larger airship, for Milady had given Richelieu copies of da Vinci's blueprints. Rochefort offers to exchange Constance for the necklace, but captures D'Artagnan and mounts an assault as soon as he retrieves the jewels. His superior airship has the upper hand and severely damages the opposing vessel, but the musketeers use the clouds to rally and counterattack. The fight ends when both ships ram each other, crashing onto Notre Dame. On the roof, D'Artagnan challenges and ultimately kills Rochefort, recovering the necklace in the process. Constance is sent ahead to quietly return the necklace to Queen Anne. The musketeers arrive at the ball and, for the sake of King Louis and his people, lie by claiming that Rochefort tried to sabotage an airship that Richelieu built for them and that they executed him for his treason on Richelieu's permission. To convince the king, Athos presents Milady's authorization, which the former accepts. Richelieu, satisfied, offers the musketeers a place in his guards, but they refuse, and Richelieu vows revenge.

Meanwhile, Milady is found alive in the English Channel by Buckingham, who declares his intention to exact revenge as they advance towards France with a massive fleet of battleships and airships.

== Cast ==
- Logan Lerman as D'Artagnan
- Milla Jovovich as Milady de Winter
- Matthew Macfadyen as Athos
- Ray Stevenson as Porthos
- Luke Evans as Aramis
- Mads Mikkelsen as Rochefort
- Gabriella Wilde as Constance Bonacieux
- James Corden as Planchet
- Juno Temple as Anne of Austria
- Freddie Fox as Louis XIII
- Til Schweiger as Cagliostro
- Orlando Bloom as Duke of Buckingham
- Christoph Waltz as Richelieu

== Production ==
=== Filming locations ===
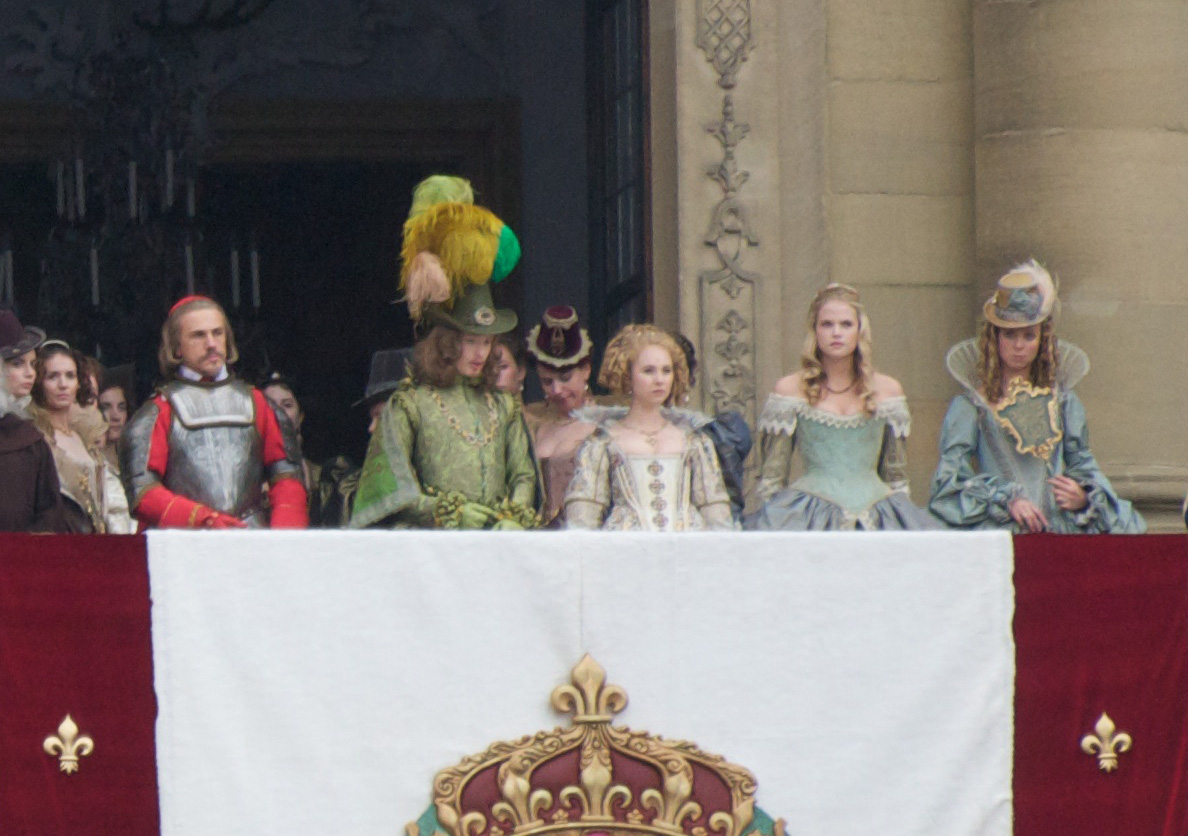
Production still, preparing a scene with Waltz, Fox, Temple, Wilde, and Eichinger

Location filming was done in Bavaria with indoor shooting at Babelsberg Studio. Filming locations included:

- Bamberg, Bavaria, Germany
- Burghausen, Bavaria, Germany
- Herrenchiemsee Palace, Bavaria, Germany
- Munich, Bavaria, Germany
- Studio Babelsberg, Potsdam, Brandenburg, Germany
- Würzburg, Bavaria, Germany (Alte Mainbrücke, Marienberg Fortress, Würzburg Residence)

=== Filming ===
Filming spanned 26 August to 9 October 2010. It was filmed with an Arri Alexa camera. A sizeable proportion of the funding came from German sources: $4 million from Bavaria's bank fund (BBF) and film and TV fund (FFF), about $1.3 million from the German Federal Film Board, about $10 million in tax rebate cash from the German film fund, the DFF and $1 million (€800,000) in subsidy financing from the Berlin-Brandenburg Medienboard. The production budget was between $75 million and $90 million.

== Soundtrack ==
The soundtrack was composed by Paul Haslinger.

British band Take That wrote and recorded the official single entitled "When We Were Young"; it was released on 22 August 2011 in the UK.

All tracks are written by Paul Haslinger.

No.	Title	Length
1.	"Only Four Men"	2:15
2.	"Special Delivery for The King"	2:26
3.	"Buckingham's Departure"	1:20
4.	"All For One"	1:48
5.	"Do You Know Who I Am?"	2:03
6.	"As Far Away As Possible"	1:40
7.	"The King and Queen"	1:38
8.	"Announcing Lady De Winter"	0:50
9.	"Concealed Weapons Tango"	1:00
10.	"Get Me One of Those!"	2:32
11.	"The Venice Heist"	5:15
12.	"She Died The Way She Lived"	1:44
13.	"I Hate Air Travel"	1:00
14.	"Rochefort Ante Portas"	1:15
15.	"Open Fire!"	2:36
16.	"A Chance to Escape"	1:05
17.	"Round Two"	1:50
18.	"If You Insist!"	1:48
19.	"You Should Have Apologized to My Horse"	1:48
20.	"Boys Will Be Boys"	1:40
21.	"The World Calls to the Young"	2:30
22.	"To France, Of Course"	1:06
Total length:		1:02:25

== Release ==
=== Box office ===
The film grossed $132,274,484. First released in Germany on 1 September 2011, it topped the box office with $3.38 million and has since grossed $16.20 million. It was released in Austria the same day, topping the box office with $503,239 on its opening weekend. It topped the box office during its opening weekends in Italy ($2,023,021), Brazil ($2,343,786) and Turkey ($219,645). In the UK, Ireland and Malta, it debuted with $2,312,509, when it was released on 12–14 October 2011. Its highest-grossing overseas opening was achieved in Japan ($3.86 million).

It was released on 21 October 2011 in North America opening at fourth place with $8,674,452. 3D accounted for 55% of its total opening and the movie received a B CinemaScore. Milla Jovovich criticised Summit Entertainment for not "promoting [the film] properly" as a "family film" in the United States. Deadline Hollywood reported that Summit responded with "She doesn't know what she's talking about and we don't know where she's coming from." and that "Wouldn't you think she would call us first about this? It's frustrating. It's not the right way to behave. If she has a problem then come to the studio and talk about it".

=== Critical reception ===
Review aggregator Rotten Tomatoes reports that 27% of 98 critics have given the film a positive review, with an average rating of 4.2 out of 10. The website's consensus is "It plays admirably fast and loose with Alexandre Dumas' classic tale, but in every other respect, The Three Musketeers offers nothing to recommend—or to set it apart from the many other film adaptations". Metacritic, which assigns a weighted average score out of 100 to reviews from mainstream critics, gives the film a score of 35 based on 15 reviews, indicating "generally unfavorable reviews". CinemaScore polls reported that the average grade moviegoers gave the film was a "B" on an A+ to F scale.

According to Stephen Holden's review in The New York Times, "Only Matthew Macfadyen's Athos exhibits the semblance of a personality ... Without drama or reverence for its source and lacking any genuine interest in history or literature, the film offers small pleasures with its visual kicks, found principally in protracted scenes of battling airships and generic stunt work adapted from Hong Kong action movies". "Not original enough to be funny, nor serious enough to be gripping, this film seemed to go on forever, and then ended with the threat of a sequel", was part of Robbie Collin's criticism in a review for The Telegraph. Jim Schembri of The Sydney Morning Herald welcomed the lack of fidelity: "It's as though the screenplay was brainstormed by Alexandre Dumas and Jules Verne ... pure multiplex mulch, as disposable as it is entertaining". Quentin Tarantino rated the film as one of his top eleven movies of 2011.

=== Home media ===
The Three Musketeers was released on DVD and Blu-ray in the United States on 13 March 2012.
