= Robert Aramayo =

English actor (born 1992)

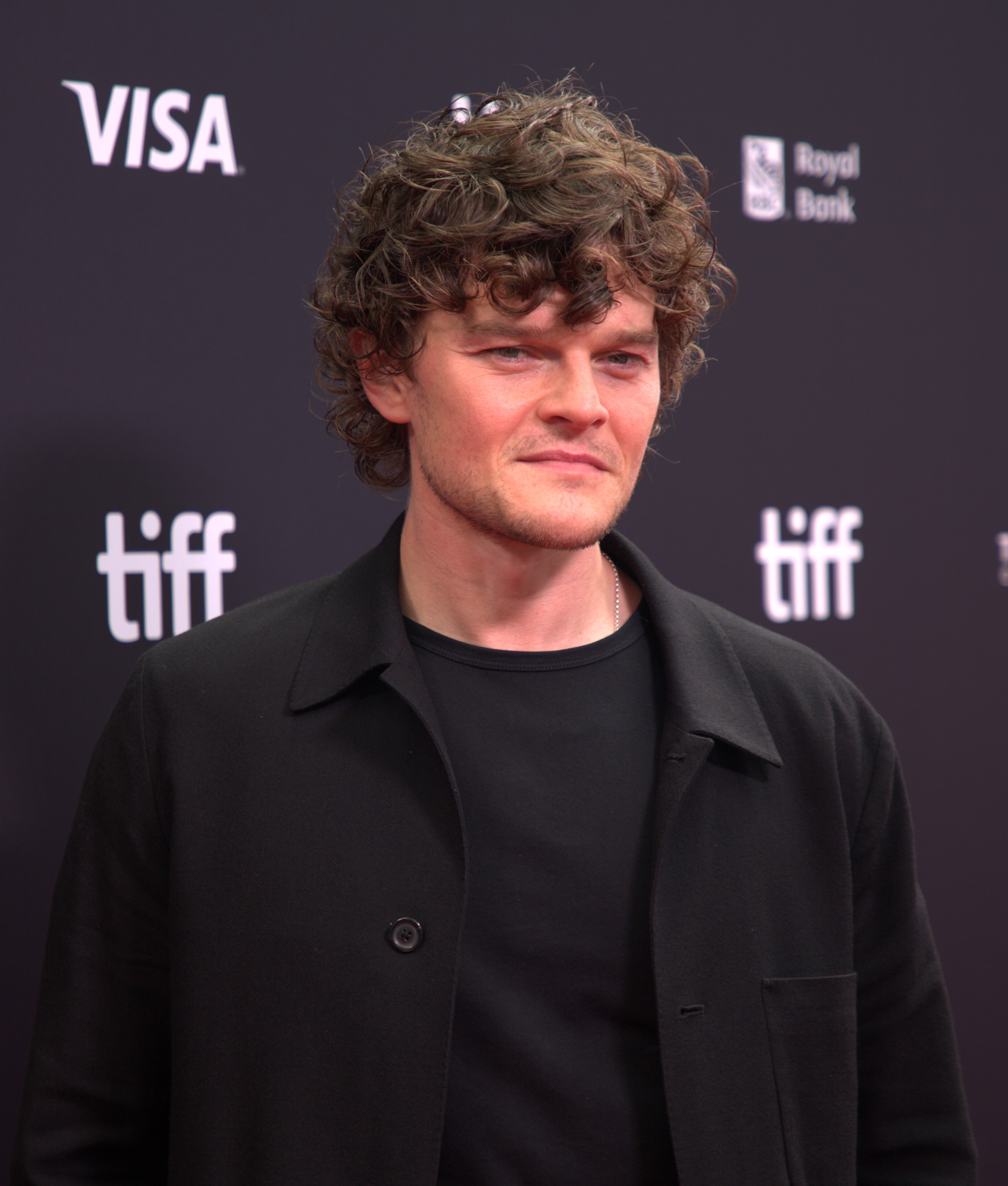
- Aramayo at the 2025 TIFF.
- Born: Robert Michael Aramayo; 6 November 1992 (age 34); Hull, East Riding of Yorkshire, England
- Education: Juilliard School (BFA)
- Occupation: Actor
- Years active: 2012–present

Robert Michael Aramayo (born 6 November 1992) is an English actor. From 2016 to 2017, he played the role of young Eddard Stark in the sixth and seventh seasons of the HBO series Game of Thrones. In 2021, he starred in the Netflix psychological thriller miniseries Behind Her Eyes. Since 2022, he has played Elrond in the Amazon series The Lord of the Rings: The Rings of Power. In 2025, he starred in I Swear, for which he won the BAFTA Award for Best Actor in a Leading Role in 2026. He also received the BAFTA Rising Star Award that year.

== Early life and education ==
Aramayo was born in Kingston upon Hull, East Riding of Yorkshire, England on 6 November 1992 to parents Michael Aramayo and Lisa (née Dawson). He is of English and Spanish descent, the latter through his paternal grandfather Pedro Aramayo, who was born in San Sebastián, Spain, and moved to England at the age of fifteen to work in the fishing industry.

Aramayo began acting at the age of seven when he played the role of Bugsy Malone in a primary school production. He attended Cavendish Primary School. When he was ten he joined the Hull Truck Youth Theatre, performing in about three plays a year. His older sister Laura also began an acting career at the Hull Truck Youth Theatre and studied drama at Oxford School of Drama.

He attended Hull's Wyke College after attending Malet Lambert School, and in 2011 won a place at Juilliard School in New York City. His performance in a Juilliard production of Anthony Burgess's A Clockwork Orange as Alex, the lead character, earned him his first film role in the Italian-American production Lost in Florence.

== Career ==
From 2016 to 2017 he played the role of young Eddard Stark in the sixth and seventh seasons of the HBO series Game of Thrones.

Aramayo played the role of mechanical engineer and Harley-Davidson co-founder William S. Harley in the Discovery Channel miniseries Harley and the Davidsons, which premiered from 5–7 September 2016. In the same year, he appeared in the Tom Ford film Nocturnal Animals. He has a role in the HBO miniseries Lewis and Clark.

He appeared in The Empty Man, directed by David Prior, The Standoff at Sparrow Creek, directed by Henry Dunham, and Eternal Beauty, directed by Craig Roberts.

In August 2019, it was announced that Aramayo had been cast on the Netflix psychological thriller miniseries Behind Her Eyes.

On 7 January 2020, it was announced that Aramayo had been cast as a character referred to as "Beldor", later revealed to be Elrond, in Amazon's television series The Lord of the Rings: The Rings of Power.

In 2025, Aramayo played the British army commander Orde Wingate during the time he was stationed in Mandatory Palestine in the film Palestine 36.

The same year, he also starred in I Swear, playing John Davidson, a well-known Scottish campaigner for Tourette syndrome. In The Guardian, Peter Bradshaw praised "a great performance from Robert Aramayo, full of intelligence and charm". For his performances in I Swear and Palestine 36, Aramayo won Breakthrough Performer of the Year at the London Film Critics Circle Awards 2025. In addition, at the 79th British Academy Film Awards, he won the BAFTA Award for Best Actor in a Leading Role for I Swear and the Rising Star Award, becoming the first person to win both BAFTAs in the same year.

== Personal life ==
Aramayo is a fan of the football club Leeds United.

== Filmography ==
=== Film ===
Year	Title	Role	Director(s)	Notes
2012	18 Actors	Hooligan	Max Woertendyke	Short film
2016	Nocturnal Animals	Steve "Turk" Adams	Tom Ford	Credited as Rob Aramayo
2016	Can't Come Closer	Dante	Gilles Geary	Short film
2017	Lost in Florence	Sal	Evan Oppenheimer	Credited as Rob Aramayo
2018	Galveston	Tray	Mélanie Laurent	
2018	The Standoff at Sparrow Creek	Keating	Henry Dunham	
2019	Stray Dolls	Jimmy	Sonejuhi Sinha	
2019	Exit Plan	Ari	Jonas Alexander Arnby	
2019	Eternal Beauty	Johnny	Craig Roberts	Voice
2020	Antebellum	Daniel	Gerard Bush & Christopher Renz	
2020	The Empty Man	Garrett	David Prior	
2021	The King's Man	Sgt. Maj. Atkins	Matthew Vaughn	
2023	Dance First	Alfred Péron	James Marsh	
2024	Lilies Not for Me	Philip Fairfax	Will Seefried	
2025	Palestine 36	Captain Wingate	Annemarie Jacir	
2025	I Swear	John Davidson	Kirk Jones	

=== Television ===
Year	Title	Role	Notes
2016	Harley and the Davidsons	William S. Harley	Miniseries
2016–2017	Game of Thrones	Young Ned Stark	4 episodes
2019	Mindhunter	Elmer Wayne Henley	1 episode
2021	Behind Her Eyes	Rob Hoyle	Miniseries
2022–present	The Lord of the Rings: The Rings of Power	Elrond	12 episodes

== Accolades ==
Award	Year	Category	Work	Result	Ref.
British Academy of Film Awards	2026	Best Actor in a Leading Role	I Swear	Won	
British Academy of Film Awards	2026	EE Rising Star Award	Himself	Won	
British Independent Film Awards	2025	Best Lead Performance	I Swear	Won	
Dublin Film Critics' Circle	2025	Best Actor	I Swear	5th place	
London Film Critics Circle	2025	Breakthrough Performer of the Year	I Swear / Palestine 36	Won	
London Film Critics Circle	2025	British/Irish Performer of the Year	I Swear / Palestine 36	Nominated	
