= Dennis Berardi =

Visual effects supervisor and producer

- Occupations: Visual effects, producer, executive
- Employer: Mr. X
- Title: Founder and Creative Director of Mr. X

Dennis Berardi is a visual effects supervisor and film producer, best known as the founder of the global VFX studio, Mr. X. He has significantly influenced the visual effects industry in Canada.

== Early career ==
Berardi entered the VFX industry in the early 1990s, working with IMAX and the National Film Board of Canada to develop early digital imaging systems for both live-action and animated films. He later led the visual effects department at Command Post Toybox, contributing to projects such as Tarsem Singh's The Cell and David Fincher's Fight Club.

== Mr. X ==
In 2001, Berardi founded Mr. X in Toronto alongside Sylvain Taillon and Chris Wallace of TOPIX, positioning the studio as a leader in VFX for feature films and television.

Mr. X's first project was for Canadian Director David Weaver's Century Hotel (2001), starring Colm Feore, Tom McCamus, Mia Kirshner, and singer Chantal Kreviazuk in an episodic tale spanning a hundred years of goings-on in a single hotel room. Hallmark Entertainment Movie of the Week, Prince Charming(2001), starring Christina Applegate and Martin Short. And the music video for Canadian Band Default's biggest single, Wasting My Time.

The studio quickly gained recognition for its work on high-profile films such as Dawn of the Dead, A History of Violence, Four Brothers with later films like Death Race, Fast & Furious, Scott Pilgrim vs. the World and television series including Vikings and Penny Dreadful.

Arguably, Mr. X's Biggest feature was The Shape of Water(2017), directed by long-time collaborator Guillermo del Toro, and notably Pompeii(2014), which was a historic recreation through visual effects of the historic city.

In 2014, Mr. X was acquired by Technicolor, expanding its global footprint with offices in Toronto, New York, Los Angeles, Adelaide, and Bangalore. Berardi served as global managing director at Mr. X until 2021.

== Herne Hill Media and Mr. X relaunch ==
In 2021, Berardi explored opportunities in co-producing leading to the launch of a new VFX company called Herne Hill Media. In 2025, following Technicolor's shutdown of its VFX operations, Berardi reacquired the rights to the Mr. X name and rebranded Herne Hill Media back to Mr. X. The relaunch was announced during the Toronto International Film Festival, with Guillermo del Toro's Frankenstein set to be the first film released under the revived brand.

== Collaborations with Guillermo del Toro ==
Since 2012, Berardi has collaborated extensively with Guillermo del Toro on projects such as The Strain, Crimson Peak, The Shape of Water (which won the Academy Award for Best Picture), Nightmare Alley, Guillermo del Toro's Cabinet of Curiosities, and most recently, Frankenstein.

== Current projects ==
Berardi is currently serving as VFX Supervisor on David Prior's upcoming Netflix feature The Boy in the Iron Box, based on the horror novella series by Guillermo del Toro and Chuck Hogan.

== Filmography ==
=== Films ===
- Fly Away Home (1996) (digital film recording)
- The Hunchback of Notre Dame (1997) (digital film scanning and recording)
- The Sweet Hereafter (1997) (digital film scanning and recording)
- Mimic (1997) (digital film recording)
- The Planet of Junior Brown (1997) (visual effects manager)
- Cube (1997) (digital film technician)
- Bride of Chucky (1998) (visual effects supervisor)
- Fight Club (1999) (visual effects supervisor)
- Superstar (1999) (visual effects manager)
- Keeping the Faith (2000) (visual effects supervisor)
- Thomas and the Magic Railroad (2000) (visual effects producer)
- The Cell (2000) (visual effects supervisor)
- Jason X (2001) (visual effects supervisor)
- Men with Brooms (2002) (visual effects supervisor)
- American Psycho II: All American Girl (2002) (producer)
- Ararat (2002) (visual effects supervisor)
- Cube^{2}: Hypercube (2002) (visual effects producer)
- Blizzard (2003) (visual effects supervisor)
- Wrong Turn (2003) (visual effects supervisor)
- Touch of Pink (2004) (visual effects producer)
- Dawn of the Dead (2004) (visual effects supervisor)
- What the #$*! Do We (K)now!? (2004) (visual effects producer)
- Resident Evil: Apocalypse (2004) (visual effects supervisor)
- Lives of the Saints (2004) (visual effects producer)
- Species III (2004) (visual effects supervisor)
- Cube Zero (2004) (co-producer)
- Assault on Precinct 13 (2005) (visual effects supervisor)
- Ice Princess (2005) (visual effects producer)
- Where the Truth Lies (2005) (visual effects supervisor)
- A History of Violence (2005) (visual effects supervisor)
- The Return (2005) (visual effects executive producer)
- The Perfect Man (2005) (visual effects supervisor)
- Four Brothers (2005) (visual effects supervisor)
- The Ice Harvest (2005) (visual effects supervisor)
- The Greatest Game Every Played (2005) (visual effects supervisor)
- Spymate (2006) (visual effects producer)
- 16 Blocks (2006) (visual effects executive producer)
- Silent Hill (2006) (visual effects executive producer)
- Waist Deep (2006) (visual effects executive producer)
- Skinwalkers (2006) (visual effects supervisor)
- Hollywoodland (2006) (visual effects supervisor)
- Man of the Year (2006) (visual effects executive producer)
- Talk to Me (2007) (visual effects executive producer)
- Dead Silence (2007) (visual effects producer)
- Shoot 'Em Up (2007) (visual effects supervisor)
- Balls of Fury (2007) (visual effects supervisor)
- Lust, Caution (2007) (visual effects executive producer)
- Fugitive Pieces (2007) (visual effects executive producer)
- Eastern Promises (2007) (visual effects executive producer)
- Closing the Ring (2007) (visual effects supervisor)
- Resident Evil: Extinction (2007) (visual effects supervisor)
- The Seeker: The Dark Is Rising (2007) (visual effects supervisor)
- The Rocker (2008) (visual effects producer)
- Kit Kittredge: An American Girl (2008) (supervising visual effects producer)
- Pig Hunt (2008) (supervising visual effects producer)
- Death Race (2008) (visual effects supervisor)
- Pontypool (2008) (visual effects executive producer)
- Flash of Genius (2008) (visual effects executive producer)
- Max Payne (2008) (supervising visual effects producer)
- Fast & Furious (2009) (visual effects supervisor)
- Grey Gardens (2009) (supervising visual effects producer)
- Taking Woodstock (2009) (visual effects producer)
- Whiteout (2009) (visual effects supervisor)
- Love Happens (2009) (visual effects supervisor)
- The Boondock Saints II: All Saints Day (2009) (visual effects producer)
- Amelia (2009) (visual effects producer)
- Repo Men (2010) (visual effects producer)
- Remember Me (2010) (visual effects producer)
- Hot Tub Time Machine (2010) (visual effects supervisor)
- Scott Pilgrim vs. the World (2010) (visual effects supervisor)
- Charlie St. Cloud (2010) (visual effects supervisor)
- Resident Evil: Afterlife (2010) (visual effects supervisor)
- Tron: Legacy (2010) (visual effects producer)
- Beastly (2011) (supervising visual effects producer)
- Hanna (2011) (supervising visual effects producer)
- The Three Musketeers (2011) (visual effects supervisor)
- A Dangerous Method (2011) (supervising visual effects producer)
- The Thing (2011) (visual effects supervisor)
- The Vow (2012) (visual effects producer)
- Resident Evil: Retribution (2012) (visual effects supervisor)
- The Factory (2012) (visual effects supervisor)
- Mama (2013) (supervising visual effects producer)
- The Mortal Instruments: City of Bones (2013) (supervising visual effects producer)
- Carrie (2013) (visual effects supervisor)
- The Best Man Holiday (2013) (supervising visual effects producer)
- Pompeii (2014) (visual effects supervisor)
- Crimson Peak (2015) (visual effects supervisor)
- Ben-Hur (2016) (visual effects supervisor)
- Resident Evil: The Final Chapter (2016) (visual effects supervisor)
- The Shape of Water (2017) (visual effects supervisor)
- Tau (2018) (supervising visual effects producer)
- Polar (2019) (visual effects supervisor)
- Shazam! (2019) (visual effects supervisor)
- Hellboy (2019) (visual effects supervisor)
- Scary Stories to Tell in the Dark (2019) (visual effects supervisor)
- Ad Astra (2019) (visual effects supervisor)
- Monster Hunter (2020) (visual effects supervisor)
- The Empty Man (2020) (visual effects supervisor)
- Antlers (2021) (visual effects supervisor)
- Nightmare Alley (2021) (visual effects supervisor)
- The Deliverance (2024) (visual effects supervisor)
- Frankenstein (2025) (visual effects supervisor)

=== Television ===
- Vikings (2013–2014) — 10 Episodes (visual effects supervisor)
- The Strain (2014–2017) — 37 Episodes (visual effects supervisor)
- Guillermo del Toro's Cabinet of Curiosities (2022) — 8 Episodes (visual effects supervisor)

== Awards and nominations ==
Year	Organization	Work	Award	Result
2004	Screamfest	Cube Zero	Best Special Effects	Won
2005	DVD Exclusive Awards	Species III	Best Visual Effects	Nominated
2009	Maverick Movie Awards	Pig Hunt	Best Special Effects: Feature	Nominated
2011	Online Film & Television Association	Scott Pilgrim vs. the World	Best Visual Effects	Nominated
2012	Genie Awards	A Dangerous Method	Best Achievement in Visual Effects	Nominated
2013	Canadian Screen Award	Resident Evil: Retribution	Achievement in Visual Effects	Won
2013	Primetime Emmy Awards	Vikings — For the episode "Dispossessed"	Outstanding Special Visual Effects in a Supporting Role	Nominated
2014	Canadian Screen Award	Vikings — For the episode "Dispossessed"	Best Visual Effects	Won
2014	Canadian Screen Award	The Mortal Instruments: City of Bones	Achievement in Visual Effects	Won
2014	Canadian Screen Award	Mama	Achievement in Visual Effects	Nominated
2015	Canadian Screen Award	Vikings — For the episode "Invasion".	Best Visual Effects	Won
2014	Primetime Emmy Awards	Vikings — For the episode "Invasion".	Outstanding Special Visual Effects in a Supporting Role	Nominated
2015	Canadian Screen Award	Pompeii	Achievement in Visual Effects	Won
2016	Visual Effects Society Awards	The Strain — For the episode "Identity"	Outstanding Visual Effects in a Photoreal Episode	Nominated
2017	Seattle Film Critics Society	The Shape of Water	Best Visual Effects	Nominated
2018	BAFTA Awards	The Shape of Water	Best Achievement in Special Visual Effects	Nominated
2018	PGA Awards	The Shape of Water	Outstanding Producer of Theatrical Motion Pictures	Won
2018	Online Film & Television Association	The Shape of Water	Best Visual Effects	Nominated
2018	Gold Derby Awards	The Shape of Water	Visual Effects	Nominated
2019	CinEuphoria Awards	The Shape of Water	Best Visual Effects - International Competition	Nominated
2022	Visual Effects Society Awards	Nightmare Alley	Outstanding Visual Effects in a Photoreal Feature	Nominated
2025	Astra Creative Arts Awards	Frankenstein	Best Visual Effects	Nominated
2025	Indiana Film Journalists Association, US	Frankenstein	Best Special Effects	Won
2025	Chicago Film Critics Association Awards	Frankenstein	Best Use of Visual Effects	Nominated
2025	San Diego Film Critics Society Awards	Frankenstein	Best Visual Effects	Nominated
2025	Austin Film Critics Association	Frankenstein	Best Visual Effects	Nominated
2025	Online Association of Female Critics	Frankenstein	Best Visual Effects	Nominated
2025	Seattle Film Critics Society	Frankenstein	Best Visual Effects	Nominated
2025	Florida Film Critics Circle Awards	Frankenstein	Best Visual Effects	Nominated
2025	Portland Critics Association Awards	Frankenstein	Best Visual Effects	Nominated
2025	New Jersey Film Critics Circle Awards	Frankenstein	Best Visual Effects	Nominated
2026	Critics Choice Awards	Frankenstein	Best Visual Effects	Nominated
2026	Chicago Indie Critics Awards	Frankenstein	Best Visual Effects	Nominated
2026	Utah Film Critics Association Awards	Frankenstein	Best Visual Effects	Nominated
2026	Minnesota Film Critics Alliance Awards	Frankenstein	Best Special Effects	Nominated
2026	Hawaii Film Critics Society	Frankenstein	Best Visual Effects	Nominated
2026	Latino Entertainment Journalists Association Film Awards	Frankenstein	Best Visual Effects	Nominated
2026	BAFTA Film Award	Frankenstein	Best Achievement in Special Visual Effects	Nominated
2026	Satellite Awards	Frankenstein	Best Visual Effects	Nominated
