= Bush Renz =

American filmmaker duo

Gerard Bush and Christopher Renz, are a married, American filmmaker duo, known collectively as Bush Renz. Their writing-directorial work includes the 2020 Lionsgate film Antebellum – featured in Variety’s top 10 films of 2020 – short films produced for Harry Belafonte, Jay-Z and Maxwell, and the upcoming HBO Max TV Series Inkwell.

Bush Renz were referred to as “Hollywood’s new power directing duo” by The Hollywood Reporter, and also appeared on the Out100 2020 list of the most influential LGBTQ+ people in America. Their creative process is marked by close collaboration from conceptualization to direction, to the extent where the expression "two directors, one vision" has become a tagline on set.

== Background ==
In 2008, they founded their own advertising agency, with accounts that included Moët & Chandon and Porsche. Despite success in this field, they later decided to turn their energies toward social-action campaigns.

== Career ==
The film career of Bush Renz burgeoned through the social justice space, with Harry Belafonte contacting them in 2016 to produce a PSA about police brutality entitled “Against the Wall”. Starring Michael B. Jordan, Michael K. Williams, and Danny Glover, the PSA featured audio excerpts from police radios and news coverage of on-duty officers shooting unarmed Black men paired against footage of Hollywood stars and media personalities up against a wall. The video was created in collaboration with social justice nonprofit Sankofa.

In 2017, Bush Renz directed a second production with Sankofa, this time in collaboration with Jay Z's streaming platform Tidal. Entitled 17, the video featured songs by Raphael Saadiq and Ty Dolla $ign, and was released to coincide with the fifth anniversary of Miami teenager Trayvon Martin’s death. Jay-Z subsequently tapped the duo to direct a music video for the song “Kill Jay Z”, a track from his 2017 studio album 4:44. The musician described “Kill Jay Z” as a song about killing his ego and being honest with himself as Shawn Carter. In an interview with Newsweek, Bush explained that he and Renz aimed for the video to tell Jay-Z's personal story while also relaying a message of hope to young, Black Americans.

Subsequent work by Bush Renz included “Love Lies,” which featured the vocal pairing of Khalid and Normani, and Maxwell's “Glass House,” a nuclear-war themed video praised by Tre Johnson of Rolling Stone for “challenging the stereotypes of what it means to be a black man with a message.”

In 2020, Bush Renz released their first feature-length work, the high-concept horror thriller film Antebellum. Starring Janelle Monáe, Eric Lange, Jena Malone, Jack Huston, Kiersey Clemons, and Gabourey Sidibe, Antebellum follows a 21st Century African-American woman who mysteriously finds herself in a Southern slave plantation. “Our intention with the film is to serve as a prescription, a medicine, a catharsis,” said Bush in an interview with the Los Angeles Times. “It’s really important that we get to a place in this country where we have the courage and the determination to confront our past, specifically this country’s original sin, if we have any hope of living in the present without being haunted by the past.”

Antebellum received a polarized response upon release. David Ehrlich of IndieWire wrote, "An artful and provocative movie about the enduring horror of America's original sin, Antebellum can't follow through on its own concept." Conversely, Out called Antebellum one of the year's most innovative films, while Peter Debruge of Variety called the film a “wickedly effective horror-movie metaphor for white supremacy’s enduring grip on American society,” and included it on his list of the ten best films of 2020.

Bush Renz have several new projects in the pipeline. HBO Max has put in development Inkwell, a TV drama series about a group of affluent Black surfers that find themselves battling a mysterious dark superpower consuming the country. Bush Renz created the show, and will direct and executive produce it under their Gloaming Pictures banner. The duo has also begun work on Rapture, their second feature. The film chronicles a family torn apart by competing beliefs, who must come together to solve the mystery around the sudden disappearance of the global population.

== Personal lives ==
Bush Renz began a personal and professional relationship in Miami in 2008. They currently live in Malibu, California.
