= Happy Anderson =

American actor

- Born: High Falls, New York, U.S.
- Occupation: Actor
- Years active: 1999–present
- Spouse: Meg Anderson (m. 2011)

Eric "Happy" Anderson is an American actor who has worked in film, television, and on and off Broadway. He is best known for his roles as Mr. James "Jimmy" Fester on Cinemax's The Knick, and Jerry Brudos in the 2025 Netflix series Monster: The Ed Gein Story reprising his role from the series Mindhunter, from executive producer and director David Fincher.

Anderson also appears in the Netflix films Bird Box as River Man, and Bright as Montehugh, a human who works for the FBI's magic division.

== Early life and education ==
Anderson was born in High Falls, New York. He graduated from Rondout Valley High School in 1995. He received a bachelor of fine arts degree from Ithaca College in 1999, graduating alongside Larry Teng, Kevin Deiboldt, Ben Wilson and Brantley Aufill. He graduated with a master's of fine arts from Indiana University Bloomington in 2002. In 2003, he moved to New York City.

== Filmography ==
=== Film ===
| Year | Title | Role | Notes |
|---|---|---|---|
| 2007 | Brutal Massacre: A Comedy | Ivan | |
| 2007 | Redacted | Battalion Commander/Prosecutor | |
| 2009 | Duplicity | Physec | |
| 2010 | Going the Distance | Terry | |
| 2011 | Postures | Preacher | Short |
| 2013 | Blue Caprice | Car Salesman | AKA The Washington Snipers |
| 2014 | Cold in July | Ted | |
| 2015 | Addiction: A 60's Love Story | Lanny Gann | |
| 2016 | Hit Men | Charlie Wolczek | |
| 2016 | The Comedian | Heckler | |
| 2017 | Bright | Hildebrandt Ulysses Montehugh | |
| 2018 | Bird Box | River Man | |
| 2018 | The Standoff at Sparrow Creek | Morris | |
| 2020 | Bad Boys for Life | Jenkins | |
| 2020 | The New Mutants | Reverend Craig | |
| 2023 | Maggie Moore(s) | Kosco | |
| 2023 | The Bikeriders | Big Jack | |
| TBA | Lear Rex | The Captain | Post-production |

=== Television ===
| Year | Title | Role | Notes |
|---|---|---|---|
| 2008 | Law & Order | Jim Matthews | Guest role; 1 episode |
| 2009 | Law & Order: Special Victims Unit | Frank | Guest role; 1 episode |
| 2010 | Army Wives | Bear | Guest role; 1 episode |
| 2011 | Eden | Prison Guard #1 | Guest role; 1 episode |
| 2011 | Bar Karma | William Wallace | Guest role; 1 episode |
| 2011 | Onion SportsDome | Jim Weiss | Guest role; 1 episode |
| 2011 | White Collar | Rusty | Guest role; 1 episode |
| 2011 | Blue Bloods | Bartender | Guest role; 1 episode |
| 2011 | Boardwalk Empire | Waiter | Guest role; 1 episode |
| 2013 | The Carrie Diaries | Bear Man | Guest role; 1 episode |
| 2013 | Smash | Doorman | Guest role; 1 episode |
| 2013 | Win | Stevy D | Television film |
| 2014 | Unforgettable | Gavin | Guest role; 1 episode |
| 2014–15 | The Knick | Mr. James "Jimmy" Fester | Recurring role; 10 episodes |
| 2015 | Forever | Lachlann | Guest role; 1 episode |
| 2015 | Banshee | Bones Tuesday | Guest role; 1 episode |
| 2015 | Deadbeat | Santa Dylan | Guest role; 1 episode |
| 2016 | Elementary | Nick Farris | Guest role; 1 episode |
| 2016 | Turn: Washington's Spies | Henry Dawkins | Guest role; 1 episode |
| 2016 | BrainDead | Butch | Guest role; 1 episode |
| 2016 | Quarry | Detective Verne Ratliff | Recurring role; 6 episodes |
| 2016 | Gotham | Deever Tweed / Tweedle Dee | Recurring role; 3 episodes |
| 2016 | Henry the 9th | Henry | Television film |
| 2017 | The Deuce | Phil Traub | Guest role; 1 episode |
| 2017 | Claws | Lamont | Recurring role; 3 episodes |
| 2017 | Mindhunter | Jerry Brudos | Recurring role; 2 episodes |
| 2017–18 | The Blacklist | Bobby Navarro | 4 episodes |
| 2019 | The Tick | Donny | 4 episodes |
| 2019 | Law & Order: Special Victims Unit | Tim Stanton | Guest role; 1 episode |
| 2019 | Reprisal | Bolo | 2 episodes |
| 2020 | Prodigal Son | Curtis | 1 episode |
| 2020 | Snowpiercer | Klimpt | Recurring role |
| 2023 | Full Circle | Joey | Miniseries |
| 2025 | Monster: The Ed Gein Story | Jerry Brudos | Episode: "The Godfather" |

=== Video games ===
| Year | Title | Role |
|---|---|---|
| 2012 | Max Payne 3 | The Local Population |
| 2013 | Grand Theft Auto V | The Local Population |
| 2018 | Red Dead Redemption 2 | The Local Pedestrian Population |
| 2020 | Saint Kotar: The Yellow Mask | Davor Gorski |

=== Theater ===
- 1999–2000: Creede Repertory Theatre
- 2003: Kentucky Shakespeare Festival
- 2004: Pennsylvania Shakespeare Festival
- 2006: Texas Shakespeare Festival
- 2008: Emancipation, Classical Theatre of Harlem
- 2010: The Merchant of Venice and A Winter's Tale, Shakespeare in the Park
- 2011: The Merchant of Venice, Broadway (dir. Daniel J. Sullivan)
- 2012: Richard III/As You Like It/Inherit The Wind, Old Globe Theatre
- 2013: The Twenty-Seventh Man, The Public Theatre
- 2014: As You Like It, Shakespeare Theatre Company
