= Sasha Stone (blogger) =

American journalist

- Born: California, US
- Education: University of California, Los Angeles
- Occupation: Blogger
- Years active: 1999–present
- Children: 1
- Website: awardsdaily.com

Sasha Stone is an American film blogger and conservative political commentator based in Los Angeles. She is the founder and editor of the film and awards discussion website Awards Daily (formerly known as Oscarwatch).

== Early life and education ==
Sasha Stone grew up in Topanga and Ojai, California, and went to Nordhoff High School. She studied film at New York University and Columbia University, and eventually graduated from the University of California, Los Angeles. She won third place in the Samuel Goldwyn Writing Awards competition at UCLA in 1993. She has one daughter.

== Career ==
Stone has written for various entertainment industry magazines, including Variety, The Hollywood Reporter, and The Wrap, and was also the film critic for the Santa Monica Mirror. She created a website in 1999 covering the Academy Awards called Oscar®Watch. The website was later renamed Awards Daily after Stone was sued in 2006 by the Academy of Motion Picture Arts and Sciences for using Oscarwatch as the site's name for eight years prior. Since its founding, the website has received a Shorty Award nomination. Additionally, Stone has appeared on NPR's Weekend Edition.

Following the Boston Marathon bombings of 2013, Stone was featured in a New York Times article about how quickly false information can spread in moments of crisis. She wrote her own account of the night in question on her personal blog. In 2014, Stone was profiled by Boris Kachka in New York Magazine about the growing industry of Oscar punditry, which Stone helped launch with Awards Daily.

Stone is also a writer on the Netflix series Voir, alongside the critics Tony Zhou, Taylor Ramos, Walter Chaw, Drew McWeeny, and David Prior, and producers Prior and David Fincher. Her episode The Summer of the Shark, focusing on the experience of seeing Jaws at the age of 10, aired on December 6, 2021.

== Politics ==
According to Stone, she became involved in politics in 2016, aligning herself with the Democrats, but left the party in 2020. She now writes and podcasts from a Republican perspective in her newsletter, Free Thinking Through the Fourth Turning.

After the 2026 midterm elections, Stone wrote that while Donald Trump’s failure to slow inflation played a role in the strong Democratic gains, she would not “admit . . . that this was an election driven by normies,” and argued that Democrats “just learned how to lie better.” (Note: Stone further added that “[t]hey are for anything that isn’t supportive of Western values. They hate Christians. They hate white people, unless they are “woke” or “good allies.” They only care about women’s rights if it means the right to kill their own babies. This is a religious war; take note.)
