= Mr. X (company) =

Canadian visual effects company

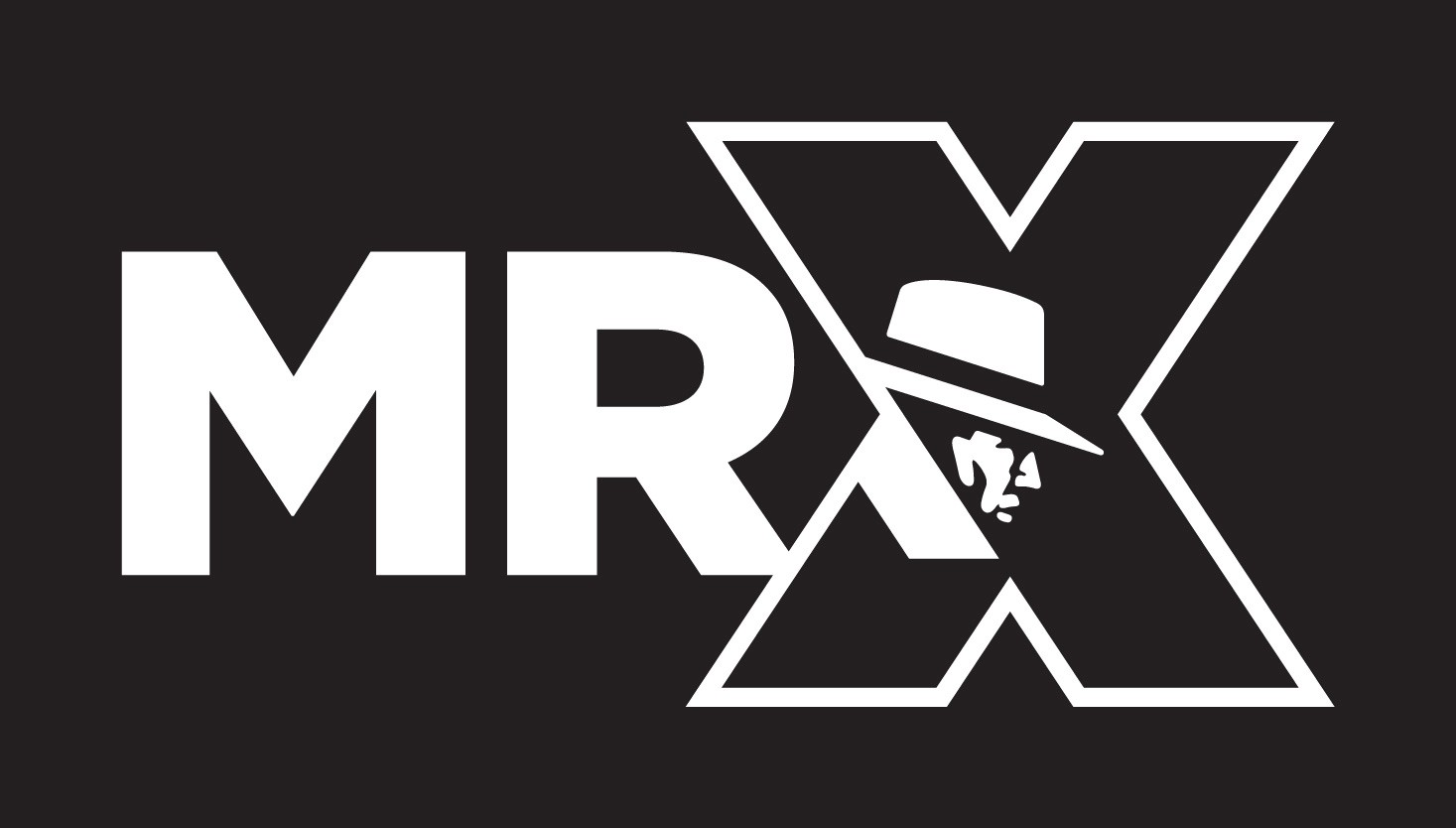
- Mr. X Logo
- Company type: Private
- Industry: Visual Effects, Film, Animation
- Founded: 2001; 24 years ago, in Toronto, Canada
- Founder: Dennis Berardi
- Headquarters: 171 East Liberty Street, Unit 220 Toronto, Ontario M6K 3P6, CA
- Key people: Dennis Berardi (Founder & Creative Director)
- Products: Visual Effects, Computer Animation
- Number of employees: 100
- Website: https://mrxfx.com/

Mr. X is a visual effects (VFX) studio headquartered in Toronto, Ontario, Canada. Founded in 2001 by Dennis Berardi, the company is known for its work on high-profile film and television projects, including collaborations with acclaimed directors such as Guillermo del Toro. Mr. X specializes in visual effects, creature design, art direction, and digital environments.

== History ==
Mr. X was established in 2001 by VFX veteran Dennis Berardi, with the vision of creating a studio that prioritized artistry, innovation, and collaboration. The company quickly gained recognition for its work on projects such as Vikings and Penny Dreadful.

In 2014, Mr. X was acquired by Technicolor and integrated into its global network alongside other VFX brands like MPC and The Mill. Under Technicolor, Mr. X expanded its operations internationally, with studios in Montreal, New York, Los Angeles, Adelaide, and Bangalore.

Dennis Berardi left Mr. X in 2021 to launch Herne Hill Media, bringing with him over 60 original Mr. X artists. Following Technicolor's financial restructuring and the shutdown of several studios, Berardi reacquired the rights to the Mr. X name in 2025 and rebranded Herne Hill Media under the original banner.

== Notable projects ==
Mr. X has contributed visual effects to numerous critically acclaimed and commercially successful productions. Some of its notable credits include:

- The Shape of Water (Academy Award-winning)
- Crimson Peak
- Nightmare Alley
- The Strain (TV series)
- Cabinet of Curiosities (TV series)
- Monster Hunter
- Ad Astra
- Shazam!
- Scott Pilgrim vs. the World
- Eastern Promises
- A History of Violence

The studio's first project under its 2025 relaunch was Guillermo del Toro's Frankenstein, which premiered in select theaters on October 17 and debuted on Netflix on November 9.

== Leadership ==
As of the 2025 relaunch, Mr. X's leadership team includes:

- Dennis Berardi - Founder, Creative Director, VFX Supervisor
- Dave Sauro - Executive Producer
- Mark Hammond - VFX Supervisor
- Ben King - VFX Supervisor
- Brandon Schaafsma - Head of Production
- Jordan Nieuwland - Art Director

== Filmography ==
=== Films ===
- Frankenstein (2025)
- Whistle (2026)
- In the Lost Lands (2025)
- The First Omen (2024)
- The Deliverance (2024)
- Nightmare Alley (2021)
- Antlers (2021)
- The Empty Man (2020)
- Monster Hunter (2020)
- In the Shadow of the Moon (2019)
- Ad Astra (2019)
- Scary Stories to Tell in the Dark (2019)
- Hellboy (2019)
- Shazam! (2019)
- Polar (2019)
- Tau (2018)
- The Shape of Water (2017)
- Resident Evil: The Final Chapter (2016)
- Ben-Hur (2016)
- Crimson Peak (2015)
- Pompeii (2014)
- Endless Love (2014)
- The Best Man Holiday (2013)
- Carrie (2013)
- The Mortal Instruments: City of Bones (2013)
- Mama (2013)
- The Factory (2012)
- Resident Evil: Retribution (2012)
- Cosmopolis (2012)
- The Vow (2012)
- The Twilight Saga: Breaking Dawn - Part 1 (2011)
- The Thing (2011)
- A Dangerous Method (2011)
- The Three Musketeers (2011)
- You Got Served: Beat the World (2011)
- Hanna (2011)
- Beastly (2011)
- Tron: Legacy (2010)
- Resident Evil: Afterlife (2010)
- Charlie St. Cloud (2010)
- Scott Pilgrim vs. the World (2010)
- Hot Tub Time Machine (2010)
- Remember Me (2010)
- Repo Men (2010)
- Amelia (2009)
- The Boondock Saints II: All Saints Day (2009)
- Cooking with Stella (2009)
- Love Happens (2009)
- Whiteout (2009)
- Away We Go (2009)
- Taking Woodstock (2009)
- Grey Gardens (2009)
- Fast & Furious (2009)
- Max Payne (2008)
- Flash of Genius (2008)
- Pontypool (2008)
- Death Race (2008)
- Pig Hunt (2008)
- Kit Kittredge: An American Girl (2008)
- The Rocker (2008)
- The Seeker: The Dark Is Rising (2007)
- Resident Evil: Extinction (2007)
- Closing the Ring (2007)
- Eastern Promises (2007)
- Fugitive Pieces (2007)
- Lust, Caution (2007)
- Balls of Fury (2007)
- Shoot 'Em Up (2007)
- Dead Silence (2007)
- Talk to Me (2007)
- Happily N'Ever After (2006)
- Man of the Year (2006)
- Hollywoodland (2006)
- Skinwalkers (2006)
- Waist Deep (2006)
- Silent Hill (2006)
- 16 Blocks (2006)
- Spymate (2006)
- The Greatest Game Every Played (2005)
- The Ice Harvest (2005)
- Four Brothers (2005)
- The Perfect Man (2005)
- The Return (2005)
- A History of Violence (2005)
- Where the Truth Lies (2005)
- Ice Princess (2005)
- Assault on Precinct 13 (2005)
- Species III (2004)
- Resident Evil: Apocalypse (2004)
- New York Minute (2004)
- Dawn of the Dead (2004)
- Wrong Turn (2003)
- Blizzard (2003)
- Cube^{2}: Hypercube (2002)
- Ararat (2002)
- American Psycho II: All American Girl (2002)
- Men with Brooms (2002)

=== Television ===
- The Miniature Wife (2026)
- The Boys (2026)
- The Abandons (2025)
- It: Welcome to Derry (2025)
- Wednesday (2025)
- Hotel Cocaine (2024)
- Guillermo del Toro's Cabinet of Curiosities (2022)
- The Strain (2014-2017)
- Vikings (2013-2014)
