= Stephanie Drake =

American actress

- Occupation: Actor
- Years active: 2012–present
- Known for: Mad Men
- Website: stephaniemdrake.com

Stephanie Drake is an American actress best known for portraying Meredith in the television series Mad Men during its fifth, sixth, seventh seasons.

== Early life ==
Drake moved around a lot in her youth, but lived for a time in Augusta, Georgia, and grew up mainly in Baltimore. She attended Carver Center for Arts where she studied acting.

After high school, she moved to Los Angeles to attend USC, where she earned a BA in Theatre. She worked at Nordstrom and J. Crew before finding success as an actor.

== Filmography ==
=== Film ===
Year	Title	Role	Notes
2006	Chicxulub	Madeline Biehn	Short
2009	In the City	Lennie	
2009	Senescence	Crystal	Short
2013	TNT's Franklin & Bash & Rizzoli & Isles Spin Offs	Isles	Short
2014	Movie Night	Cindy	Short
2014	Monster in the Wash	Lucy	Short
2016	Fear, Inc.	Ashleigh Davidson	
2017	Cups & Robbers	Carrie	Short
2018	Deep Murder	Dr. Bunny Van Clit	

=== Television ===
Year	Title	Role	Notes
2012–15	Mad Men	Meredith	Recurring role
2013	The Middle	Sandra	"The Ditch"
2013–14	Jimmy Kimmel Live!	Various	3 episodes
2015	CSI: Cyber	Jessica Pope	"Ghost in the Machine"
2015	Unmatch.com	Maggie Skye	"A Date with a Flight Attendant"
2016	Rent-a-Gay	Jane	"What Every Single Woman Needs"
2016	Noches con Platanito		1 episode
