= Fear, Inc. =

2016 film

- Directed by: Vincent Masciale
- Written by: Luke Barnett
- Produced by: Vincent Masciale; Luke Barnett; Heather Kasprzak; Natalie Masciale
- Starring: Lucas Neff; Caitlin Stasey; Chris Marquette; Abigail Breslin; Stephanie Drake; Eric Lange; Mark Moses; Leslie Jordan
- Cinematography: Shan Liljestrand
- Production company: Lone Suspect
- Release date: October 21, 2016
- Country: United States
- Language: English

Fear, Inc. is a 2016 American comedy horror film directed by Vincent Masciale and written by Luke Barnett. The film stars Lucas Neff, Caitlin Stasey, Chris Marquette and Stephanie Drake.

== Plot ==
A woman is chased by an attacker in a parking garage. She grabs her phone in attempt to end the attack by insisting that "it" wasn't part of the plan. The person on the other end puts her on hold. She then spots the robed and masked man approaching her with a nail studded baseball bat. As she rushes to an elevator to escape, the attacker disappears. She walks to her car, assuming the chase is over. She is then stopped by a weird security guard telling her that if she finds anything creepy, do not hesitate to give him a call. She hops inside her car discover several people are locating her through her radio. A man pops up from the back seat and strangles her to death.

Horror movie buff Joe and his girlfriend Lindsey go to a haunted maze, but Joe feels it isn't scary enough. They get spooked by a random man who gives Joe a calling card for a company called "Fear, Inc." where they bring fears to life. Next morning, Joe's friends Ben and Ashleigh arrive at their house for a Halloween party. Joe tells them about the calling card, but Ben warns him not to take part of it as someone he knew got seriously hurt because of it. After the party, Joe calls "Fear, Inc." out of curiosity but is informed their service has sold out. Later, Joe's neighbor Bill warns him about spotting an intruder in Joe's home. Joe dismisses his warning but gets attacked by a seemingly crazy person. Police arrive and Lindsey and the others confirm they saw no one in the house. That night, the television mysteriously turns on showing the news channel. The reporter seems to be reporting in front of Joe's house informing them that Bill, Ashleigh, Ben, and Lindsey were killed by a suspect named Joe Foster. Ben looks outside to see no reporter out there. The three scolded Joe for pulling up yet another prank. Joe admits he called "Fear, Inc." the other night.

The lights go out. Joe begs the others to just go with it. He volunteers himself to check the breaker outside, where his attention is caught by Bill, who comes running outside his home. Bill warns Joe about yet another intruder before he is stabbed by a cloaked and masked man (in the same manner as Drew Barrymore's character from Scream"). Thinking Bill was in on the prank, Joe returns inside and tells the others what happened. Attempting to escape, they find out Joe's car has been damaged. Thinking it is going way too far, Lindsey insists they call the cops. They decide to lock all doors and windows until all the cops arrive. While on the run, Ashleigh gets separated from the group. They find her pinned to a tree with arrows (to which Joe recognized as a scene from Friday the 13th). Joe, amazed at what he thinks is a great prosthetic, is warned by a barely alive Ashleigh to run back inside as a cloaked and masked man approaches them, knocking Joe unconscious. He wakes up to find Ben gagged and strapped to a chair next to a table filled with cutting contraptions. The TV turns on and a cloaked man instructs Joe to cut Ben's left hand off or else Lindsey (shown through the TV tied to a bed with an armed man next to her) will die. Joe thinks he is still being pranked as he references his situation in the Saw films. He arbitrarily cuts off Ben's left arm and Lindsey is spared. Thinking the special effects were cool enough, Joe continues to follow instructions from the man, ripping open Ben's chest to retrieve a key. Noticing Ben is unconscious and seemingly dead with real blood is pouring out of his body, Joe realizes he killed Ben and screams in terror. Joe hears Lindsey's screams and rushes to help her, finding her unconscious but alive. He calls the cops once more since nobody arrived yet. While calling, he is attacked by a masked man but Joe strangles and kills him. As he grabs his phone once more to notify the emergency operator, Lindsey suddenly wakes up and unties herself from the bed. She tells Joe to hang up the phone. Confused, Joe asks Lindsey what is going on. Lindsey explains that everything is a prank and that Ashleigh and Ben are alive and well, which is proven when they enter the house picking out their prosthetic.

When Lindsey and Joe tell them the man was actually killed, Ben and Ashleigh freak out and explain "Fear, Inc." is actually a very dangerous company, and when they find out one of their men was killed, they will be coming for the rest of them. Ben and Ashleigh flee, leaving Joe and Lindsey to deal with it. Lindsey explains Joe's phone was reprogrammed by the company so that every time he makes an emergency call, it redirects to "Fear, Inc." Lindsey insists they bury the body in the desert. They steal the "Fear, Inc." van. On the way, they are stopped by the sheriff who gets hit by a stray van (as in Final Destination). They escape and proceed to bury the body. Suddenly, another van comes, and "Fear, Inc." leader Abe and his cronies capture Joe and Lindsey and threaten to kill them because Joe killed an employee. Joe's face is covered with a cloth and his hands tied. He is left behind in the desert while Lindsey is taken away and killed. Joe gets out of his bindings and walks to a seemingly abandoned diner. He is let in by a man and allowed to use the phone. Joe calls 911 again only for it to be answered by Lindsey, who is sitting on the other side of the empty diner. Relieved at seeing her alive and well, he rushes to hug her. Lindsey then explains it was all part of the package and Ben and Ashleigh were in on it the entire time. Abe and his cronies arrive at the diner along with Ben, Ashleigh, and Tom and they celebrate Joe for overcoming the horror. While drinking, Ben admits to Joe that "Fear, Inc." is dangerous for real and is thankful that nobody got hurt, as Abe's cronies began to surround the four. Joe realizes he knows the scene from somewhere. Abe quotes a line from Cobra saying, "You're the disease, I am the cure." Suddenly, they snap Ben's neck, shoot Ashleigh in the head, and slash Lindsey's throat. Before Abe kills Joe, he explains he can't let him leave without experiencing his all-time favorite death scene from films.

The film ends with a phone ringing and Judson, "Fear, Inc.'s" phone operator answers the phone by saying their service is sold out. He tells the rest of "Fear, Inc." they've got another customer.

== Cast ==
- Lucas Neff as Joe Foster, a horror movie buff who contacts "Fear, Inc."
- Caitlin Stasey as Lindsey Gains, Joe's girlfriend
- Chris Marquette as Ben Davidson, Joe's best friend who knows about "Fear, Inc."
- Stephanie Drake as Ashleigh Davidson, Ben's wife and Lindsey's friend
- Patrick Renna as Tom, one of Abe's cronies who gives Joe the card for "Fear, Inc."
- Richard Riehle as Bill, Joe's neighbor, a former veteran and neighborhood watch member, who continually warns Joe about suspicious men in the neighborhood
- Naomi Grossman as Cat, one of Abe's cronies
- Leslie Jordan as Judson, the operator who answers "Fear, Inc." customers
- Eric Lange as Officer Smith, an LAPD officer who pulls Joe and Lindsey over
- Ronnie Gene Blevins as Shining Jack, a seemingly crazed man who attacks Joe in his home
- David Ury as Pete, a diner owner
- Ashlynn Yennie as Trisha Harrison, a television reporter
- Marlon Young as Officer Dodson, an LAPD officer who responds to a call from Joe after he is attacked in his home
- Dean Cates as Officer Catania, a LAPD officer who responds to a call from Joe after he is attacked in his home
- Barry Papick as Cab Driver, who drives the four friends home after a party
- Mark Moses as Abe, leader of the "Fear, Inc."
- Abigail Breslin as Jennifer Adams, one of "Fear, Inc.'s" previous clients

== Production ==
The film is directed by Vincent Masciale based on the script by Luke Barnett, both are also producing the film along with Heather Kasprzak and Natalie Masciale. Principal photography on the film began in early August 2015 in Los Angeles.

== Reception ==
Variety wrote: "The main thing early reels have going for them isn’t any actual cleverness or wit, but Neff’s pleasant riffing within a stock slacker-bro role. When his character stops having fun, so does the audience." On Rotten Tomatoes, the film has an approval rating of 46%, based on reviews from 13 critics.
