= Christopher Renz =

American writer, director, producer and activist

Christopher Renz is an American film director, screenwriter, and producer. Since 2012, he has collaborated with husband Gerard Bush via the directing/screenwriting duo Bush Renz, whose work includes the 2020 Lionsgate film Antebellum – featured in Variety’s top 10 films of 2020 – the upcoming HBO Max TV Series Inkwell, and the documentary All Deliberate Speed.

Bush Renz were named "Hollywood’s new power directing duo" by The Hollywood Reporter, and also appeared on the Out100 2020 list of the most influential LGBTQ+ people in America.

== Film career ==
Bush Renz collaborated with Harry Belafonte in 2016 to produce a PSA about police brutality entitled "Against the Wall". The work starred Michael B. Jordan, Michael K. Williams, and Danny Glover. In 2017, they wrote and directed a short film for the song "Kill Jay Z", from Jay Z’s album 4:44, followed by a music short for Maxwell ("The Glass House") and music videos for Khalid and Normani.

In 2020, Bush Renz released their first feature-length work, the high-concept horror thriller film Antebellum. Starring Janelle Monáe, Eric Lange, Jena Malone, Jack Huston, Kiersey Clemons, and Gabourey Sidibe, Antebellum follows a 21st Century African-American woman who mysteriously finds herself in a Southern slave plantation. In an NPR interview, Renz said of the film, "we feel that horror is a great way in for general audiences who may not . . . normally receive a message like this. So we kind of want to hide the medicine inside this - what seems to be a horror film so that you walk away a different person."

Antebellum received a polarized response upon release. David Ehrlich of IndieWire wrote, "An artful and provocative movie about the enduring horror of America's original sin, Antebellum can't follow through on its own concept." Conversely, Out called Antebellum one of the year's most innovative films, while Variety's Peter Debruge described it as "wickedly effective horror-movie metaphor for white supremacy’s enduring grip on American society," and included it on his list of the ten best films of 2020.

Projects in development include an HBO Max TV drama series entitled Inkwell, and a second feature film called Rapture.

== Additional activism ==
In June 2020, amidst the protest movement following the murder of George Floyd, Renz and Bush took the reins of Lionsgate's Twitter, Instagram, and Facebook feeds, posting an image of a Confederate monument overlaid with Black Lives Matter protest art. Subsequent posts included short videos of James Baldwin, Toni Morrison, and Nina Simone discussing racism, and a biographic-themed post on the killing of Breonna Taylor. "We want to educate," said Renz, remarking on the Taylor post. "So many people are speaking about [these issues] on social media, but a large percentage of the population doesn’t know who [Taylor] is, so we thought it was important to highlight that."

== Personal life ==
Renz was born and raised in Connecticut. He now lives in Malibu, California with husband Bush.
