= AM1200 (film) =

2008 film directed by David Prior

- Directed by: David Prior
- Written by: David Prior
- Produced by: David Prior
- Starring: Eric Lange; John Billingsley; Ray Wise
- Cinematography: Brian Hoodenpyle
- Edited by: David Prior
- Production company: Dreamlogic Pictures
- Release date: October 3, 2008 (H.P. Lovecraft Film Festival)
- Running time: 39 minutes
- Country: United States
- Language: English

AM1200 is a 2008 horror film directed by David Prior and starring Eric Lange, John Billingsley and Ray Wise.

== Plot ==
It focuses on Sam Larson, an executive who is on the run after the suicide of a friend who he set up to take the fall for a scheme to steal money from the company where they worked, Harry Jones. While driving along at night and trying to stay awake, Sam turns on his car radio to the A.M. band. While tuning through frequencies, he stops on 1200 kHz when he hears a call for help due to a medical emergency at radio station KBAL, transmitting from Mount Zaphon. He unwittingly drives to the radio station and when his car breaks down on the road, he ventures inside to use the telephone. There he finds a man handcuffed to a pole. The man is a worker there possessed by something. He asks to be released, but when he isn't, he rips his hand out of the handcuffs. Sam knocks him out after he approaches him. Sam then gets possessed by the same thing as the man. He chops up the man and throws his body parts into hole in the basement which seems to have an otherworldly creature in it. The film ends with Sam calling for help from the radio station, in a possessed, modified voice.

== Production ==
Director David Prior had a background in producing DVDs of various films and documentaries for over ten years before writing and directing AM1200.

== Screenings and release ==
AM1200 had its first screening on November 13, 2007 at the Arclight Cinemas in Hollywood. It was officially released on October 3, 2008 at the H.P. Lovecraft Film Festival.

== Awards ==
- The Brown Jenkin (won at the 2008 H.P. Lovecraft Film Festival).
