= Chinese, Japanese, dirty knees =

Racist playground chant

"Chinese, Japanese, dirty knees" is a racist playground chant that has been used to mock children of Asian origin. The chant is often accompanied by gestures intended to caricature East Asian eyes, with upward-slanting gestures for Chinese and downward-slanting gestures for Japanese.

== Summary ==
The full rendering of the chant is "Chinese, Japanese, dirty knees, look at these," sometimes with a breast-related gesture accompanying the "look at these" phrase (such as pinching the front of one's shirt into mock breasts). The reference to breasts alludes to a stereotype of Asian women as promiscuous, according to Philip Nel, a professor of English at Kansas State University.

In The Colors of Excellence, published by Teachers College Press, many Asian Americans reported hearing the chant, and some recalled being taunted or bullied with it during their youth in the 20th century.

University of St Andrews professor Gregory B. Lee, writing that "many a Chinese immigrant child over the past 100 years has had to endure" the chant, notes that "[t]he allusion to dirt in this ditty is not aleatory", linking it to the stereotype of unclean "Orientals".

== Incidents ==
The rhyme was later cited in a legal brief filed by the United States Chamber of Commerce in Matal v. Tam, a Supreme Court of the United States case regarding the band The Slants' attempt to register its name as a trademark. Simon Tam has explained that the band's name originated from hearing the rhyme during his childhood. In a 2008 interview, Tam stated that members of the band had experienced racial harassment in their youth and that the name was intended to reclaim racial slurs rather than reproduce them as insults.

The chant was the subject of controversy surrounding the 2020 film Monster Hunter. In an early scene, the Chinese-American soldier Marshall, played by MC Jin, says, “Look at my knees!”, before another soldier asks, “What kind of knees are these?” Marshall then replies, “Chi-knees!”, a pun on “Chinese”. Some Chinese viewers interpreted the exchange as an allusion to the playground chant “Chinese, Japanese, dirty knees, look at these” and criticized the line as racially offensive. The film was subsequently withdrawn from Chinese cinemas shortly after its release. Although the filmmakers and actors denied that the line had anything to do with the chant, the film was removed from circulation, and Chinese authorities censored references to it online. Constantin Film subsequently apologized for the dialogue and removed it from versions of the film released internationally.

== See also ==
- Anti-Asian racism
- Stereotypes of East Asians in the United States
