= Gerard Bush =

American writer, director, producer and activist

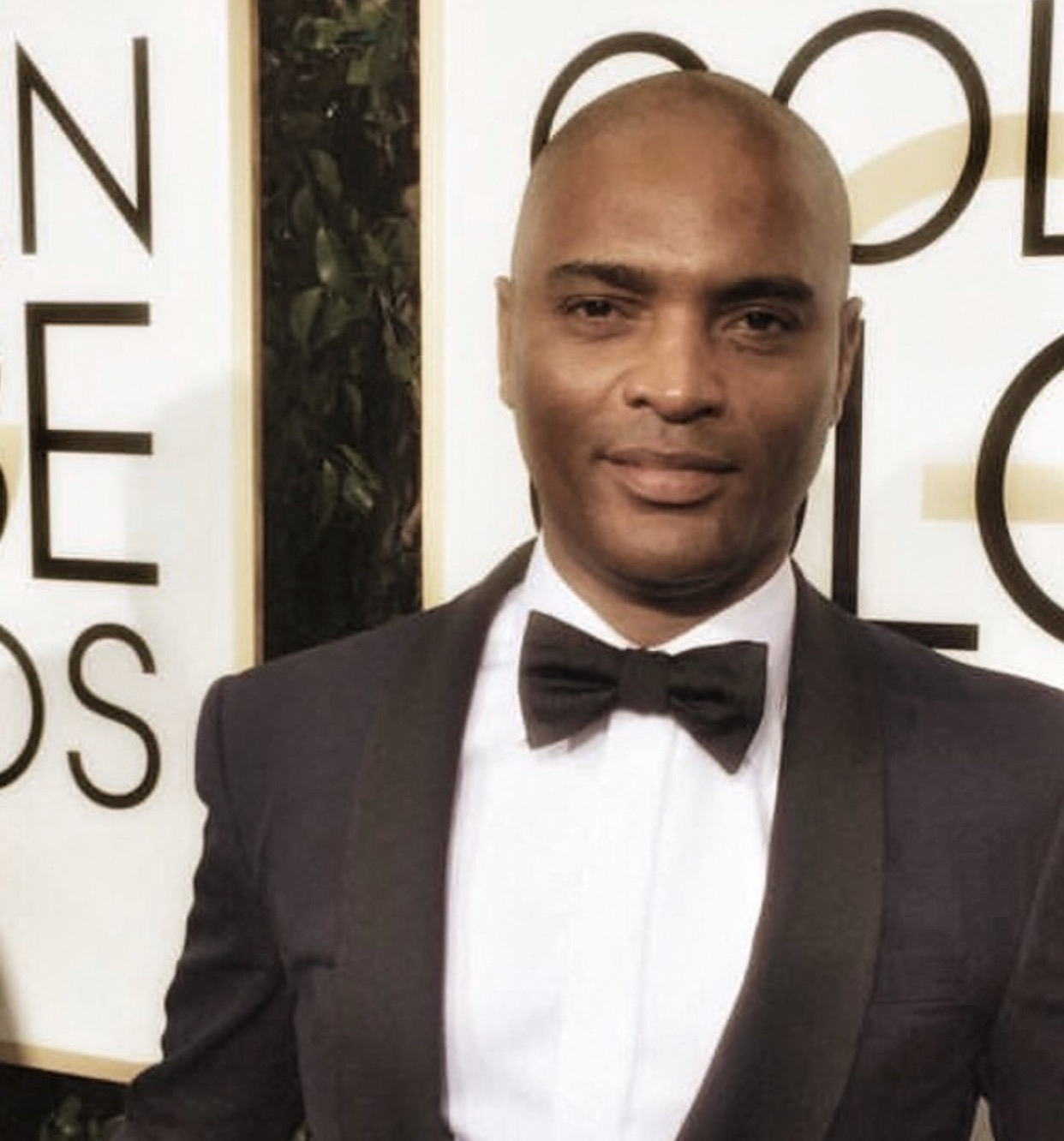
Gerard Bush in 2016

Gerard Winston Bush (born April 5, 1978) is an American film director, screenwriter, producer, and author. Since 2012, he has collaborated with husband Christopher Renz via the directing/screenwriting duo Bush Renz, whose work includes the 2020 Lionsgate film Antebellum – featured in Variety’s top 10 films of 2020 – the upcoming HBO Max TV Series Inkwell, and the documentary All Deliberate Speed. Bush Renz were named "Hollywood's new power directing duo" by The Hollywood Reporter, and also appeared on the Out100 2020 list of the most influential LGBTQ+ people in America.

== Film career ==
Bush Renz collaborated with Harry Belafonte in 2016 to produce a PSA about police brutality entitled "Against the Wall". The work starred Michael B. Jordan, Michael K. Williams, and Danny Glover. In 2017, they wrote and directed a short film for the song "Kill Jay Z", from Jay Z's album 4:44, followed by a music short for Maxwell ("The Glass House") and music videos for Khalid and Normani.

In 2020, Bush Renz released their first feature-length work, the high-concept horror thriller film Antebellum. Starring Janelle Monáe, Eric Lange, Jena Malone, Jack Huston, Kiersey Clemons, and Gabourey Sidibe, Antebellum follows a 21st Century African-American woman who mysteriously finds herself in a Southern slave plantation. "Our intention with the film is to serve as a prescription, a medicine, a catharsis," said Bush in an interview with the Los Angeles Times. "It's really important that we get to a place in this country where we have the courage and the determination to confront our past, specifically this country's original sin, if we have any hope of living in the present without being haunted by the past."

Antebellum received a polarized response upon release. David Ehrlich of IndieWire wrote, "An artful and provocative movie about the enduring horror of America's original sin, Antebellum can't follow through on its own concept." Conversely, Out called Antebellum one of the year's most innovative films, while Peter Debruge of Variety called the film a "wickedly effective horror-movie metaphor for white supremacy's enduring grip on American society," and included it on his list of the ten best films of 2020.

Projects in development include an HBO Max TV drama series entitled Inkwell, and a second feature film called Rapture.

== Publications and activism ==
Gerard Bush has written and spoken extensively on the subject of racism and social justice in America. His 2012 HuffPost op-ed argued that voter suppression was alive and well in Florida and nationwide, a position he elaborated upon in a media appearance on MSNBC.

In a 2020 article for Vanity Fair, speaking to the COVID-19 pandemic and the protests sweeping the nation in the aftermath of the murder of George Floyd, Bush said, "This is a moment that calls out for Black art, and calls on Black art. Our role as artists has, in my opinion, always been to make the audience uncomfortable, to catalyze a national dialogue by holding up a mirror and reflecting back the truth, no matter how ugly."

Bush also appeared on CNN's Don Lemon Tonight, where he called on Black activists to speak out and enact meaningful change following Floyd's murder.

In an October 2020 piece for NBC News, he argued that "white pride, and our acceptance of even mild versions of it as generalized pride in our country, is the greatest enemy of our ability as a nation to survive this latest inflection point in America's democratic experiment."

== Personal life ==
Bush was born on April 5, 1978, and was raised in Houston, Texas. He now lives in Malibu, California, with husband Renz.
