= Awards Daily =

American entertainment news website

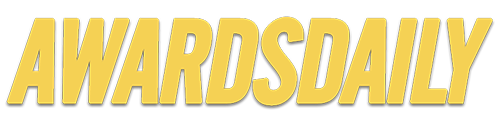
- Website type: Entertainment news
- Available in: English
- Owner: Sasha Stone
- Founder: Sasha Stone
- Website: awardsdaily.com
- Launched: 1999; 27 years ago
- Current status: Online

Awards Daily (formerly known as Oscarwatch) is a website primarily focused on the film industry and the film awards seasons that was established in 1999 by American editor Sasha Stone.

== History ==
Awards Daily was started in 1999 by Sasha Stone, a writer for entertainment industry magazines who had previously worked for Variety, The Hollywood Reporter, and The Wrap. Originally called Oscarwatch, it was launched as a website covering the race for the Academy Awards from start to finish. It was later expanded to include a television coverage section as well. In addition, the site also features movie trailers, film scripts, previews of upcoming movies and interviews. In 2006, it was renamed Awards Daily after the Academy of Motion Picture Arts and Sciences sued Stone for copyright infringement due to the use of Oscarwatch as the site's name for eight years prior.

In October 2010, Awards Daily launched a weekly podcast called Oscar Poker. Guests have included Fran Walsh, Peter Berg, Sarah Paulson, and Rachel Weisz.

Since its founding, Awards Daily has received a Shorty Award nomination. It has been used as a source on NPR's Weekend Edition and regularly collaborates with the awards prediction website Gold Derby. It was profiled by Boris Kachka in New York Magazine about the growing industry of Oscar punditry, which Awards Daily helped launch.

In 2024, three contributors to Awards Daily left the website to found a new site named The Contenders, in response to Stone's shift in political views toward supporting Donald Trump.

== See also ==
- Gold Derby
