= Voir (TV series) =

TV series with essays about cinema

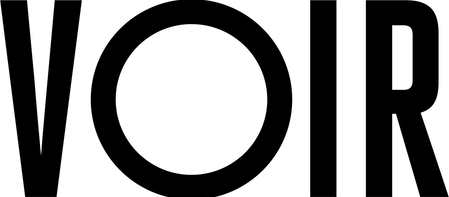
- Genre: Documentary
- Written by: Sasha Stone; Taylor Ramos; Tony Zhou; Drew McWeeny; Walter Chaw
- Narrated by: Sasha Stone; Tony Zhou; Drew McWeeny; Taylor Ramos; Walter Chaw
- Composer: Jason Hill
- No. of seasons: 1
- No. of episodes: 6

Production
- Executive producers: David Fincher; Joshua Donen; Neil Kellerhouse; David Prior; Ross M. Dinerstein; Ross Girard; Ceán Chaffin
- Producers: David Prior; Sasha Stone; Taylor Ramos; Tony Zhou; Nach Dudsdeemaytha; Drew McWeeny; Keith Clark; Julie Ng; Walter Chaw
- Cinematography: Martim Vian; Alfonso Chin
- Editors: Keith Clark; Lori Zei; Tony Zhou; Julie Ng
- Running time: 17–23 minutes
- Production companies: Netflix; Campfire Studios

Original release
- Network: Netflix
- Release: December 6, 2021

Voir is an American television series featuring video essays about cinema. It was released on Netflix in 2021.

== Cast ==
- Sasha Stone
- Eva Wild as Sasha
- Shannon Hayes as Teen Sasha
- Olive Bernadette Hoffman as Lisa
- Molly Ann Grotha as Teen Lisa
- Tony Zhou
- Taylor Ramos
- Walter Chaw
- Drew McWeeny
- David Prior
- Glen Keane
- Brenda Chapman
- Luis Gadea
- Jennifer Yuh Nelson
- Lisa Coulthard

== Episodes ==
No.	Title	Directed by	Written by	Original release date
1	"Summer of the Shark"	David Prior	Sasha Stone	December 6, 2021
Sasha Stone tells of her experience being obsessed as a child by Steven Spielberg's Jaws (1975) as it ushered in the era of blockbusters.
2	"Ethics of Revenge"	Taylor Ramos & Tony Zhou	Taylor Ramos & Tony Zhou	December 6, 2021
Tony Zhou uses Park Chan-wook's Lady Vengeance (2005) as an example to examine depictions of revenge across cinema, and interviews Jennifer Yuh Nelson and film scholar Dr. Lisa Couthard.
3	"But I Don't Like Him"	David Prior	Drew McWeeny	December 6, 2021
Drew McWeeny looks at David Lean's Lawrence of Arabia (1962) to explore the unique appeal of unlikable protagonists across classic gangster cinema, The Godfather series, and the works of Martin Scorsese.
4	"The Duality of Appeal"	Taylor Ramos & Tony Zhou	Taylor Ramos & Tony Zhou	December 6, 2021
Taylor Ramos interviews former Disney animators Glen Keane and Brenda Chapman about making appealing female animated characters, highlighting the lack of diversity in the design of these characters. Character designer Luis Gadea is tasked to create a new character that bucks the standards.
5	"Film vs Television"	Taylor Ramos & Tony Zhou	Taylor Ramos & Tony Zhou	December 6, 2021
Taylor Ramos finds examples of the blurred line between film and television, including The Sopranos.
6	"Profane and Profound"	Keith Clark & Julie Ng	Walter Chaw	December 6, 2021
Walter Chaw looks at the unusual way Walter Hill's 48 Hrs. (1982) explores experiences of systemic racism compared to similar films.

== See also ==
- Every Frame a Painting
- The Story of Film: An Odyssey
- Los Angeles Plays Itself
