= Deep Murder =

2018 horror comedy film directed by Nick Corirossi

- Film poster
- Directed by: Nick Corirossi
- Written by: Quinn Beswick; Josh Margolin; Benjamin Smolen; Nikolai von Keller
- Produced by: Jesse Berger; Eric B. Fleischman; Drew Foster; Brent C. Johnson; Patrick McErlean; Andrew Swett
- Starring: Quinn Beswick; Katie Aselton; Jessica Parker Kennedy; Chris Redd; Josh Margolin; Stephanie Drake; Jerry O'Connell; Christopher McDonald
- Cinematography: Daniella Nowitz
- Edited by: Josh Margolin
- Music by: Zachary Dawes; Nick Sena
- Production companies: Defiant Studios; Dark Web Productions; Life Entertainment
- Distributed by: Screen Media Films
- Release dates: September 21, 2018 (LAFF); June 14, 2019 (United States)
- Running time: 95 minutes
- Country: United States
- Language: English

Deep Murder is a 2018 American horror comedy film, directed by Nick Corirossi, from a screenplay by Quinn Beswick, Josh Margolin, Benjamin Smolen and Nikolai von Keller. It stars Beswick, Katie Aselton, Christopher McDonald, Jerry O'Connell, Jessica Parker Kennedy, Chris Redd, Stephanie Drake and Margolin.

It had its world premiere at the Los Angeles Film Festival on September 21, 2018. It released on June 14, 2019, by Screen Media Films.

== Cast ==
- Quinn Beswick as Hugh Dangler
- Katie Aselton as Babs Dangler
- Christopher McDonald as Richard Dangler
- Jerry O'Connell as Doug Dangler
- Jessica Parker Kennedy as Phyllis "Babysitter" Gorman
- Chris Redd as Jace Jizz
- Stephanie Drake as Dr. Bunny Van Clit
- Josh Margolin as Detective Brock Cross
- Nikki Benz as Sexy Plummer
- Neel Nanda as Pizza Boy
- Mickey Hooch Jr. as Hot Cop
- Isaac C. Singleton Jr. as Sexy Fireman

== Production ==
In June 2017, it was announced Christopher McDonald, Johnny Simmons, Katie Aselton, Stephanie Drake, Jessica Parker Kennedy and Chris Redd had joined the cast of the film, with Nick Corirossi directing from a screenplay by Quinn Beswick, Josh Margolin, Benjamin Smolen, and Nikolai von Keller. Eric B. Fleischman, Andrew Swett, Drew Foster, Jesse Berger, Pat McErlean and Brent C. Johnson will serve as producers on the film.

== Release ==
The film had its world premiere at the Los Angeles Film Festival on September 21, 2018. Shortly after, Screen Media Films acquired distribution rights to the film. It released on June 14, 2019.
