= The Standoff at Sparrow Creek =

- Film poster
- Directed by: Henry Dunham
- Written by: Henry Dunham
- Produced by: Johnathan Brownlee; Adam Donaghey; Sefton Fincham; Amanda Presmyk; Dallas Sonnier
- Starring: James Badge Dale; Brian Geraghty; Patrick Fischler; Happy Anderson; Robert Aramayo; Gene Jones; Chris Mulkey
- Cinematography: Jackson Hunt
- Edited by: Josh Ethier
- Production companies: Cinestate; XYZ Films; Look to the Sky Films
- Distributed by: RLJ Entertainment
- Release dates: September 9, 2018 (Toronto International Film Festival); January 18, 2019
- Running time: 88 minutes
- Country: United States
- Language: English

The Standoff at Sparrow Creek is a 2018 American thriller film written and directed by Henry Dunham, in his feature debut.

The film premiered at the 2018 Toronto International Film Festival in September 2018, and was released in the United States on January 18, 2019.

== Plot ==
Gannon, an ex-police officer, hears automatic gun shots and explosions in the distance one night. Listening to a police radio, he hears that a man identified as a militia member fled on foot from a cemetery after opening fire at a police funeral with a modified AR-15 and multiple IEDs.

Gannon drives to a secluded lumber warehouse where he meets six other men who, along with Gannon, are part of a local militia. These six men include leader Ford, school teacher Beckman, a former member of the Aryan Brotherhood named Morris with ties to cop murders, former Highwayman Hubbel, a young man named Keating who barely speaks, and a man named Noah who brought Gannon into the militia.

The men discover one of the AR-15s in the armory is missing, as well as body armor and grenades, confirming someone in the group is the gunman. They resolve to stay in the warehouse all night until they can find out which of them carried out the shooting; none of the members will admit, but they all concede to Gannon’s demand that they turn off and hand over their cellphones so their location isn’t tracked by the cops.

Gannon is tasked by Ford to interrogate the others one-on-one in order to figure out who the shooter is. It’s during this period that Gannon realizes that Noah, who unbeknownst to the others is his brother, is an undercover officer assigned to the militia, but Gannon resolves to keep him safe through the investigation. Noah tells Gannon to make sure he records the confession of whoever did it, otherwise the cops have nothing.

Gannon’s prime suspects are Morris and Keating, but Ford suspects Noah due to the timeline of his alibi not checking out; he was supposedly at a gun range 20 minutes away, but arrived to the warehouse in half that time. While Gannon is tasked by Ford to get either Morris, Keating or Noah to confess on tape, Beckman mans the radio equipment and a fish tracker to see if anyone approaches the warehouse.

Gannon interrogates and records Morris first, who admits to the shooting as revenge for the police covering up the rape and killing of his daughter. However, Ford walks into the room, berating Morris verbally and physically, informing Gannon that Morris is lying to bring attention to his daughter's murder. Ford not only suspects Noah, but suspects Gannon is protecting him for some reason. Ford threatens to kill Noah if Keating doesn't admit to the shooting.

Meanwhile, Hubbel is guarding over Keating, in which Hubbel confides that when he was a Highwayman, one of his foreman used cheap asphalt that created a massive pothole, leading to an eighteen car pile-up that got five people killed. That same foreman then made a deal with police for a lighter sentence to try to get Hubbel to admit that he and the rest of his team intentionally created the pothole. Hubbel murdered that foreman to protect his team, and then fled for his life. It remains vague as to whether or not Hubbel was telling the truth or if he did intentionally cause the deaths of five people.

Beckman hears over the radio that more militia shootings are taking place, inspired by the initial shooting, with one attempt planned to occur at the local police station. Beckman attempts to broadcast that their militia has nothing to do with the shooting, to no avail. There is a brief moment of tension in the warehouse when a police officer arrives to inspect the warehouse, but Gannon has Beckman give up the location of the militia planning to attack the local police station over the radio. This information is relayed to the police officer, and he drives away.

Gannon begins interrogating Keating, reading from his journal in which he professed a desire to shoot up his old high school. Gannon taunts Keating, telling him that he knows that all Keating wants is for his name to be recognized for committing an atrocious act, and that if Keating doesn’t confess to the shooting, he’ll never get the chance again. Keating, however, finally speaks and suspects that Gannon is desperate for Keating’s confession in order to protect Noah.

With no other way to protect Noah without Keating’s confession, Gannon decides that he himself needs to die in order to give the police a scapegoat. As Gannon plays Russian roulette in front of Keating, continuously adding a bullet to his revolver each time the gun doesn’t go off, Gannon cites the incident that made him join the militia.

Gannon was an undercover officer, along with his partner Richmond, to take down multiple cells of the Ku Klux Klan. But Gannon was lured out to the woods by his superior officer, and with almost a dozen officers surrounding him, was forced to kill Richmond then and there in a staged Klan execution to falsely make the arrests of fifteen Klan cells. The official report stated Gannon had to kill Richmond to maintain his cover.

Keating admits to the shooting before Gannon can shoot himself, confessing over the radio and a video camera set up by Beckman. However, the police believe the confession to be false, mentioning that they've received multiple confessions in the last hour. With no other suspects and no one willing to confess, Ford demands that either Noah confesses or he will be killed. Gannon interrogates Noah, and while Noah doesn’t confess, he tearfully admits that all he ever wanted was to not be a disappointment to Gannon.

Ford strings Noah up from a noose in the warehouse to execute him. However, Gannon intervenes the execution by activating a timer on his cellphone that he hid somewhere in the warehouse. Ford tasks Hubbel to shoot Gannon if he tries to save Noah while the others split up to look for the cellphone before the police ping the warehouse’s location. Gannon tackles Hubbel to the ground and snaps his neck. Before the brothers can escape, Ford holds them both at gunpoint, but they are saved last minute by tear gas that is being shot into the building; the police have arrived, and everyone scrams.

Gannon and Noah exit the warehouse to a squad of police officers with their guns aimed at them. Ford, Beckman and Keating open up the warehouse bay doors, armed with rifles and wearing body armor. Gannon pleads Ford to say that they both committed the shooting in order to let Noah and the others go free, but Ford refuses. Morris, who had been sulking in the warehouse since his interrogation ended, arrives geared up as well to join the others, deactivating the outdoor motion light. Gannon tackles Noah to the ground for safety as Morris, Beckman, Keating and Ford are gunned down.

Noah then reveals that he and the police faked the shootings; the explosions in the distance Gannon heard earlier in the night were propane tanks being shot at. All of the news reports that the men listened to on the radio were other police officers making false reports, all to get the militia to distrust each other and gear up for a showdown so they could shoot and kill on site. Noah used Gannon to not only keep the militia on a defensive/unreachable lockdown when the time came, but to also record Morris and Keating confessing to things they never committed to build the narrative that the militia were planning to attack at a cop’s funeral.

Gannon pulls a gun on Noah, demanding to know why he didn’t inform him about any of it. Noah tells Gannon that he couldn’t tell him what the plan was because he’s not a cop anymore; everyone who died tonight weren’t a part of a revolution, they’re pieces on a board for a bigger play. Gannon hands Noah his gun, and Gannon is allowed to walk away before being asked if he wants to rejoin the police. Feeling like he’s right back where he was with Richmond, surrounded by a squad of police with no choice but to do as the police want him to do, the film cuts to black before Gannon decides.

== Cast ==
- James Badge Dale as Gannon
- Chris Mulkey as Ford
- Brian Geraghty as Noah
- Robert Aramayo as Keating
- Patrick Fischler as Beckmann
- Happy Anderson as Morris
- Gene Jones as Hubbel
- Bret Porter as Kowalski
- Cotter Smith as Roman
- Nichole Abshire as Police Officer

== Release ==
The film premiered at the 2018 Toronto International Film Festival in September 2018, and was released in the United States on January 18, 2019.

== Reception ==
On review aggregator Rotten Tomatoes, the film holds an approval rating of 78% based on 51 reviews, with an average rating of 7/10. The website's critics consensus reads: "Taut and unpredictable, The Standoff at Sparrow Creek should satisfy suspense fans in the mood for a well-told story topped with a generous helping of violence." Metacritic, which uses a weighted average, assigned the film a score of 62 out of 100, based on 10 critics, indicating "generally favorable" reviews. Brian Tallerico of RogerEbert.com gave the film 3.5 out of 4 stars stating "Dunham displays a remarkable skill when it comes to using limited space, trapping his characters in a warehouse on a life-changing night". Bilge Ebiri of Vulture.com described the film as a "memorable feature". Adam Graham of The Detroit News called film a "sharp debut from writer-director Henry Dunham".

== See also ==
- List of directorial debuts § 2018
