= Achok Majak =

American fashion model (born 1992)

- Born: 1992 (age 33–34); Santa Barbara, California, U.S.
- Occupation: Model
- Modeling information
- Height: 1.78 m (5 ft 10 in)
- Agency: Select Management Milano

Achok Majak (born 1992) is South Sudanese-American fashion model.

== Early life ==
Majak was born and raised in Santa Barbara, California. She is of South Sudanese descent.

== Career ==
Majak has appeared in campaigns for Tiffany & Co., (along with models Vittoria Ceretti, Julia Nobis, and Georgina Grenville) Gucci, Revlon, Marc Jacobs, and Balenciaga. She has walked the runway for brands such as Gucci, Marc Jacobs, Max Mara, Zac Posen, Acne Studios, Miu Miu, Vionnet, Rick Owens, Emilio Pucci, and Belstaff. She has appeared in editorials for Elle, i-D, Vogue Italia, WSJ, CR Fashion Book, and Love.

In 2020, Majak made her feature film debut as an actress in the horror film Antebellum (2020).
