= Every Frame a Painting =

Series of video essays about film

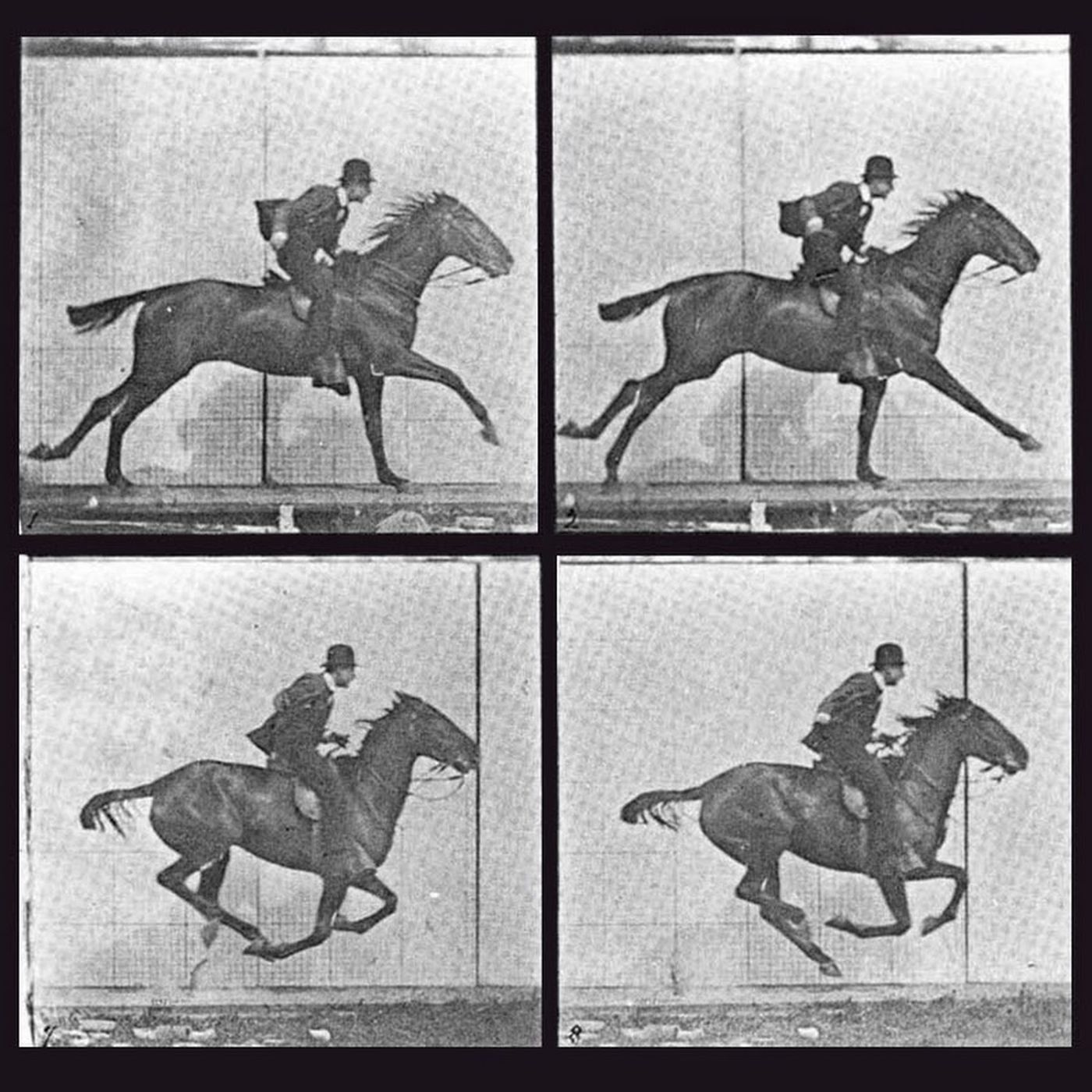
Every Frame a Painting's YouTube icon, based on Eadweard Muybridge's Animal Locomotion photograph series

Every Frame a Painting is a series of video essays about film form, editing, and cinematography created by Taylor Ramos and Tony Zhou between 2014 and 2016, published on YouTube and Vimeo. The series is considered a pioneer of film criticism on YouTube, and has been praised by several filmmakers. The series was revived in a limited series in 2024, alongside a short film by Ramos and Zhou.

== History ==
Taylor Ramos and Tony Zhou created Every Frame a Painting after facing difficulties in their professional careers of "communicating visual ideas to non-visual people"; Ramos is an animator and Zhou a film editor. Around March 2013, Zhou often found himself identifying film techniques, which he believed would make for effective video essays. About a year later, after Zhou complained about his work, Ramos told him to pour his creative energy into a new video series, which prompted him to start writing. For each essay, Zhou wrote and researched, Ramos organized the thesis and made animations, and they both worked on the final editing process. Zhou narrated each video, opening with his signature line, "Hi, my name is Tony and this is Every Frame a Painting ".

The first video was published on April 16, 2014, about Bong Joon-ho's Mother and the use of side-on profile shots. Ramos and Zhou forwent traditional commercial sponsorships and funded the series with viewer support on Patreon. The final essay of the original run was published on September 12, 2016, about the use of orchestral sound in the Marvel Cinematic Universe. Ramos and Zhou published the script of the final, unproduced essay on Medium on December 2, 2017, as both a farewell and explanation for the series' end, as well as a postmortem with advice for future essayists. They felt the channel's increased audience and YouTube's copyright policies limited their creative freedom. Following this, Ramos and Zhou produced video essays released as special features for the Criterion Collection and FilmStruck. They also wrote the introduction to the artbook The Wes Anderson Collection: Isle of Dogs (2018), and wrote, produced, directed, and narrated several episodes of Netflix's video essay series Voir (2021).

Ramos and Zhou's short film—The Second, starring Paul Sun-Hyung Lee—premiered at the Fantasia International Film Festival on July 20, 2024. After the script was written, Ramos storyboarded the film; Zhou created a 15-minute animatic, which was shown to others when pitching the film. It was filmed in Toronto, while additional production and editing in Los Angeles and Vancouver. A limited series of three video essays, announced in July, was released on Every Frame a Painting in preparation for the film's release; the first was released on August 26, and the last on January 13, 2025, alongside The Second, followed by the film's animatic the next day. Ramos and Zhou found YouTube's interface "much more complicated" upon returning but were thankful they had maintained subscribers over their eight-year absence.

For nine months in 2026, Ramos and Zhou worked on a research project comparing the South Korean and Canadian film industries, preparing a keynote presentation set to debut at the Vancouver International Film Festival on October 3. Following this, they are set to return to several projects, including original video essays for YouTube. In November, they announced an umbrella brand, Every Frame, which houses their original content (including an upcoming narrative podcast), presentations, and collaborations.

== Format ==
Each Every Frame a Painting essay explores one particular topic, often a single creator, with many organized around a scene that illustrates the idea. The editing style, use of film clips, and remixing of audio were developed in response to YouTube's Content ID system, with the goal of meeting the criteria for fair use and to avoid being flagged by the copyright violation algorithm. Zhou lamented that the format imposed by Content ID prevented them from making videos about filmmakers such as Andrei Tarkovsky and Agnès Varda, as they would require longer clips. He experimented with private uploads to test YouTube's Content ID system.

== Videos ==
| No. in series | Title | Subject(s) | Release date | Views (millions) (Note: As of November 2026) |
|---|---|---|---|---|
| 1 | "Mother (2009) – The Telephoto Profile Shot" | Mother | April 15, 2014 | 0.90 |
| 2 | "The Imposter (2012) – Looking into the Lens" | The Imposter | April 25, 2014 | 0.75 |
| 3 | "The Spielberg Oner" | Steven Spielberg | May 6, 2014 | 2.90 |
| 4 | "Wolf Children (2012) – The Lateral Tracking Shot" | Wolf Children | May 16, 2014 | 0.89 |
| 5 | "Edgar Wright – How to Do Visual Comedy" | Edgar Wright | May 26, 2014 | 11.36 |
| 6 | "Martin Scorsese – The Art of Silence" | Martin Scorsese | June 14, 2014 | 3.16 |
| 7 | "Michael Bay – What is Bayhem?" | Michael Bay | July 2, 2014 | 3.29 |
| 8 | "Satoshi Kon – Editing Space & Time" | Satoshi Kon | July 24, 2014 | 3.98 |
| 9 | "A Brief Look at Texting and the Internet in Film" | — | August 15, 2014 | 1.79 |
| 10 | "Robin Williams – In Motion" | Robin Williams | September 9, 2014 | 1.69 |
| 11 | "David Fincher – And the Other Way is Wrong" | David Fincher | October 1, 2014 | 4.59 |
| 12 | "The Silence of the Lambs – Who Wins the Scene?" | The Silence of the Lambs | October 14, 2014 | 1.78 |
| 13 | "Snowpiercer – Left or Right" | Snowpiercer | October 28, 2014 | 1.84 |
| 14 | "Jackie Chan – How to Do Action Comedy" | Jackie Chan | December 2, 2014 | 25.40 |
| 15 | "The Bad Sleep Well (1960) – The Geometry of a Scene" | The Bad Sleep Well | January 28, 2015 | 0.96 |
| 16 | "Drive (2011) – The Quadrant System" | Drive | January 30, 2015 | 1.82 |
| 17 | "Akira Kurosawa – Composing Movement" | Akira Kurosawa | March 19, 2015 | 10.81 |
| 18 | "F for Fake (1973) – How to Structure a Video Essay" | F for Fake | March 31, 2015 | 1.15 |
| 19 | "Lynne Ramsay – The Poetry of Details" | Lynne Ramsay | May 7, 2015 | 1.17 |
| 20 | "In Praise of Chairs" | — | May 29, 2015 | 1.28 |
| 21 | "Chuck Jones – The Evolution of an Artist" | Chuck Jones | July 16, 2015 | 4.59 |
| 22 | "Vancouver Never Plays Itself" | — | September 13, 2015 | 2.18 |
| 23 | "Buster Keaton – The Art of the Gag" | Buster Keaton | November 21, 2015 | 8.40 |
| 24 | "Memories of Murder (2003) – Ensemble Staging" | Memories of Murder | December 30, 2015 | 1.85 |
| 25 | "Joel & Ethan Coen – Shot | Reverse Shot" | Coen brothers | February 25, 2016 | 4.06 |
| 26 | "How Does an Editor Think and Feel?" | — | May 12, 2016 | 2.76 |
| 27 | "The Marvel Symphonic Universe" | Marvel Cinematic Universe | September 12, 2016 | 7.95 |
| 27 | "Hollywood Scores & Soundtracks: What Do They Sound Like? Do They Sound Like Things?? Let's Find Out!" | — | September 12, 2016 | 1.76 |
Every Frame a Painting Presents: The Second
| — | "The Second (2024) – A Limited Series Trailer" | — | July 4, 2024 | 0.31 |
| 28 | "The Sustained Two-Shot" | — | August 26, 2024 | 0.62 |
| 29 | "What Would Billy Wilder Do?" | Billy Wilder | October 7, 2024 | 0.39 |
| 30 | "Where Do You Put the Camera?" | — | January 14, 2025 | 1.18 |
| — | "The Second | Short Film" | — | January 14, 2025 | 0.25 |
| — | "The Second | Animatic vs. Final" | — | January 15, 2025 | 0.06 |

=== Collaborations ===
Ramos and Zhou have produced video essays released as special features for companies like the Criterion Collection, some of which have since been published online.

| Title | Subject(s) | Collaborator(s) | Online release date | Views (millions) |
|---|---|---|---|---|
| "Interview with Tracy J. Butler & Fable Siegel" | Lackadaisy | Tracy J. Butler & Fable Siegel | November 14, 2025 | 0.04 |
| "Limitations into Virtues" | Night of the Living Dead | Criterion | February 19, 2026 | 0.05 |
| "The Edges of Wuxia" | The Blade | Criterion | April 11, 2026 | 0.13 |
| "The Visual Comedy of Isle of Dogs" | Isle of Dogs | Criterion | May 2, 2026 | 0.10 |
| "Ozu in Color" | Yasujirō Ozu | Turner Classic Movies | May 5, 2026 | 0.14 |
| "'How It's Done': Making the Airplane Sequence" | KPop Demon Hunters | Criterion | November 3, 2026 | 0.14 |

== Reception and legacy ==
Kevin B. Lee, a film critic and video essayist, called the series "the standout newcomer to the video essay scene" in 2014. Many critics point to the essay on Jackie Chan and action comedy film as among the best. Wired's Brian Raftery credited Every Frame a Painting for kicking off "a dramatic growth spurt" in YouTube-based movie criticism and stated the channel's "astute, patient, visually assured film essays...help[ed] push the medium past its ranting-rando-with-a-camera phase". Allison de Fren called the series "a master class on film form" with consistent style and tone; she found Zhou's "chummy, upbeat performance" a stark contrast to previous essays such as Los Angeles Plays Itself (2004). Every Frame a Painting's 2024 videos were named by three critics in Sight and Sound's list of the year's best video essays.

Filmmakers such as Christopher McQuarrie, Seth Rogen, and Edgar Wright have given praise to Every Frame a Painting's essays. Mark Mothersbaugh said Every Frame a Painting's video essay on "unmemorable" Marvel Cinematic Universe scores directly influenced his composition of Thor: Ragnarok's score to be different from previous Marvel films.

== See also ==
- Cinephilia
