= Video essay =

Video content that advances an argument

A video essay is an essay presented in the format of a video recording or short film rather than a conventional piece of writing; the form often overlaps with other forms of video entertainment on online platforms such as YouTube. A video essay allows an author to directly quote from film, video games, music, or other digital media, which is impossible with traditional writing. While many video essays are intended for entertainment, they can also have an academic or political purpose. This type of content is often described as educational entertainment.

== Predecessors ==
Häxan (1922), a horror essay film about the historical roots and superstitions surrounding witchcraft

A film essay (also essay film or cinematic essay) consists of the evolution of a theme or an idea rather than a plot per se, or the film literally being a cinematic accompaniment to a narrator reading an essay. From another perspective, an essay film could be defined as a documentary film visual basis combined with a form of commentary that contains elements of self-portrait (rather than autobiography), where the signature (rather than the life story) of the filmmaker is apparent. The cinematic essay often blends documentary, fiction, and experimental film making using tones and editing styles. The genre is not well-defined but might include propaganda works of early Soviet filmmakers like Dziga Vertov, documentary filmmakers including Chris Marker, Michael Moore (Roger & Me, Bowling for Columbine and Fahrenheit 9/11), Errol Morris (The Thin Blue Line), Morgan Spurlock (Super Size Me) and Agnès Varda. Jean-Luc Godard describes his later works as "film-essays". Two filmmakers whose work was the antecedent to the cinematic essay include Georges Méliès and Bertolt Brecht. Méliès made a short film about the 1902 coronation of King Edward VII, which mixes actual footage with shots of a recreation of the event. Brecht was a playwright who experimented with film and incorporated film projections into some of his plays. Orson Welles made an essay film in his own pioneering style, released in 1974, called F for Fake, which dealt specifically with art forger Elmyr de Hory and with the themes of deception, "fakery", and authenticity in general.

David Winks Gray's article "The essay film in action" states that the "essay film became an identifiable form of filmmaking in the 1950s and '60s". He states that since that time, essay films have tended to be "on the margins" of the filmmaking world. Essay films have a "peculiar searching, questioning tone ... between documentary and fiction" but without "fitting comfortably" into either genre. Gray notes that just like written essays, essay films "tend to marry the personal voice of a guiding narrator (often the director) with a wide swath of other voices". The University of Wisconsin Cinematheque website echoes some of Gray's comments; it calls a film essay an "intimate and allusive" genre that "catches filmmakers in a pensive mood, ruminating on the margins between fiction and documentary" in a manner that is "refreshingly inventive, playful, and idiosyncratic".

== Popularity ==
While the medium (or as film scholar Eric Faden called it "media stylos") has its roots in academia, it has grown dramatically in popularity with the advent of online video-sharing platforms like YouTube and Vimeo. A political strain of YouTube video essays developed in the mid-2010s as progressive creators responded to the growth of the online alt-right and to controversies such as Gamergate. Creators associated with this development included Lindsay Ellis and Hbomberguy. The term BreadTube later came to describe a loose collection of left-wing video essayists and content creators. In 2021, the Netflix series Voir premiered featuring video essays focusing on films like 48 Hrs and Lady Vengeance.

Fellow video essayist Thomas Flight observes videos about popular media receiving more clicks as part of the video essay economy.

In 2017, Sight & Sound, the magazine published by the British Film Institute (BFI), started an annual polls of the best video essays of the year. The 2021 poll reported that 38% of the essayists whose work received a nomination are female (which implies an increase of the 5% from the previous year), and that predominantly the video essays are in English (95%).

== Academic application ==
Academics, especially in regard to film, find video essays great for critique and analysis. Academics also believe that video essays are an excellent way for students to explore creativity whilst being scholarly. Professors have found that students benefit and become better writers after learning how to make video essays.

In 2014, a new peer-reviewed academic journal, [in]Transition, was created to have a platform for scholarly videographic work and video essays. [in]Transition is a collaborative project between MediaCommons and the official publication of the Society for Cinema and Media Studies, Journal of Cinema & Media Studies. The goal of [in]Transition is to bolster videographic work as a legitimate and valid medium for scholarship.

Since 2015 under a grant from the National Endowment for the Humanities, and under the auspices of Middlebury’s Digital Liberal Arts Summer Institute, Professors Jason Mittell, Christian Keathley and Catherine Grant have organized a two-week workshop with the aim to explore a range of approaches by using moving images as a critical language and to expand the expressive possibilities available to innovative humanist scholars. Every year the workshop is attended by 15 scholars working in film and media studies or a related field, whose objects of study involve audio-visual media, especially film, television, and other new digital media forms.

In 2018, Tecmerin: Revista de Ensayos Audiovisuales began as another peer-reviewed academic publication exclusively dedicated to videographic criticism. The same year Will DiGravio launched the Video Essay Podcast, featuring interviews with prominent video essayists.

== See also ==
- PechaKucha
- Supercut
- Cinephilia
- Film criticism
- Mashup video
