= Monster Hunter (film) =

2020 film by Paul W. S. Anderson

- Theatrical release poster
- Directed by: Paul W. S. Anderson
- Written by: Paul W. S. Anderson
- Based on: Monster Hunter (Note: In December 2020, Paul W. S. Anderson said that the film's storyline had been primarily based on a crossover event in the game Metal Gear Solid: Peace Walker with Monster Hunter Freedom Unite in 2010, in which Big Boss briefly faced monsters from the Monster Hunter series.) by Capcom
- Produced by: Jeremy Bolt; Paul W. S. Anderson; Dennis Berardi; Robert Kulzer; Martin Moszkowicz
- Starring: Milla Jovovich; Tony Jaa; T.I.; Meagan Good; Diego Boneta; Josh Helman; MC Jin; Ron Perlman
- Cinematography: Glen MacPherson
- Edited by: Doobie White
- Music by: Paul Haslinger
- Production companies: Constantin Film; Tencent Pictures; Toho; AB^{2} Digital Pictures
- Distributed by: Screen Gems (through Sony Pictures Releasing; Worldwide); Constantin Film Verleih (Germany); Tencent Pictures Huaxia Film Distribution (China); Toho Towa Pictures (Japan)
- Release dates: December 4, 2020 (China); December 18, 2020 (United States); March 26, 2021 (Japan); July 1, 2021 (Germany)
- Running time: 103 minutes
- Countries: Germany; China; Japan; United States
- Language: English
- Budget: $60 million
- Box office: $47.9 million

Monster Hunter is a 2020 monster film written, directed, and produced by Paul W. S. Anderson, based on the video game series of the same name by Capcom. The film stars Milla Jovovich in her sixth outing together with Anderson, her husband. The other cast members include Tony Jaa, T.I., Meagan Good, Diego Boneta, Josh Helman, MC Jin, and Ron Perlman. The film follows Artemis (Jovovich) and her loyal soldiers when they are transported to a new world, where they engage in a battle for survival against enormous monsters with incredible powers.

A film adaptation based on the series had been in conception since 2012 by director Paul W. S. Anderson. The film was formally announced by Capcom in October 2018, with production starting that month with Constantin Film. Principal photography on the film began on October 5, 2018 and was completed on December 19, 2018, in Cape Town, South Africa.

Monster Hunter was released to theaters during the COVID-19 pandemic, by Sony Pictures Releasing (excluding Germany, China and Japan), opening in China on December 4, 2020, and in the United States on December 18, 2020. The film was a box office bomb, having only grossed $47.9 million worldwide against a production budget of $60 million and received mixed reviews, with praise for its action sequences, visual effects, and musical score, but criticism for its direction and editing. It received a nomination at the 19th Visual Effects Society Awards, in the category Outstanding Effects Simulations in a Photoreal Feature.

== Plot ==
"It is entirely possible that behind the perception of our senses, new worlds are hidden of which we are totally unaware."

— Opening caption

In the new world, humans struggle to survive against a wide variety of large and savage monsters. The Hunter, a warrior trained to kill these powerful creatures, is separated from the Admiral's crew when their ship is attacked by the Diablos, a massive horned monster that moves beneath the sands. In the old world, Earth, U.S. Army Ranger Captain Natalie Artemis and her United Nations security team search for a missing squad of soldiers in the desert. A sudden storm pulls them through a dimensional portal to the new world where they find the charred remains of the missing soldiers and their vehicles.

As the Diablos approaches Artemis' team, the Hunter, who is observing the group, fires a warning signal. The Diablos, impervious to bullets and grenades, attacks and kills two squad members. The survivors hide in a cave, where they are attacked by a pack of monstrous arachnid-like Nerscyllas. Artemis is injected with a paralyzing venom, and as the others try to save her, more Nerscyllas arrive and swarm them. Artemis wakes up in a Nerscylla lair, finding her team dead or infected with Nerscylla spawn. She escapes the lair by setting the pursuing monsters on fire.

Above ground, Artemis runs into the Hunter and, after fighting each other, they grudgingly agree to cooperate. She learns that the portals are created by the Sky Tower, a structure located across the desert. The Hunter reveals they will need to kill the Diablos in order to cross the desert safely and reach the tower. Artemis learns how to fight using the Hunter's unique bladed weapons and helps him set a trap to kill the Diablos, after weakening it with Nerscylla venom. The attack is successful, with Artemis delivering the final blow, but the Hunter is badly wounded. Constructing a makeshift stretcher, she dutifully carries him across the desert.

The pair reach an oasis populated with tortoise-like herbivorous dinosaurs known as Apceros. When a Rathalos, a fire-breathing wyvern, flies by and causes the Apceros to stampede, Artemis and the Hunter are rescued by a group led by the Admiral. He explains that the Sky Tower was built by the first civilization to travel between worlds, using the monsters to protect it. Artemis agrees to help kill the Rathalos so she can return home.

In the ensuing battle, Artemis falls through the portal, returning to Earth where she is found by Captain Roark's military search and rescue group. But the portal remains open, and the Rathalos emerges and begins wreaking havoc on Roark's forces. Artemis is able to slow it down long enough for the Hunter to slip through the portal and deliver the fatal shot. The Admiral approaches Artemis, just before the appearance of another flying monster; a dragon known as Gore Magala. He notes that as long as the portal remains open, there will always be the threat that monsters will pass through to Earth. Artemis concludes that finding a way to take down the Sky Tower is now their primary objective.

Palico, the Admiral's cat-like companion, arrives to help fight the Gore Magala, while an ominous cloaked figure observes the battle from the top of the tower.

== Cast ==
- Milla Jovovich as Natalie Artemis, a US Army Ranger in a United Nations military team.
- Tony Jaa as The Hunter, a skilled warrior that fights giant monsters.
- Tip "T.I." Harris as Lincoln
- Meagan Good as Dash
- Diego Boneta as Marshall
- Josh Helman as Steeler
- Jin Au-Yeung as Axe
- Hirona Yamazaki as Handler
- Nanda Costa as Lea
- Jannik Schümann as Aiden
- Ron Perlman as The Admiral, the chieftain of a group of Hunters.
- Nic Rasenti as Captain Roark
- Aaron Beelner as Palico

== Production ==
=== Development ===
In 2012, Resident Evil director Paul W. S. Anderson was then-rumored to be in talks to direct a film adaptation of the Monster Hunter franchise. Anderson stated he had discovered the Monster Hunter series on travels to Japan around 2008 and had become a fan of the series, and considered a film adaptation as a "passion project". Within a couple years from his introduction to the games, Anderson said he had started discussions with Capcom about securing the rights to make the film.

During the September 2016 Tokyo Game Show Capcom producer Ryozo Tsujimoto stated that a live-action Monster Hunter film was in development within Hollywood. A few months later, Anderson and producer Jeremy Bolt, both who helped to bring Capcom's Resident Evil game to a series of films, had obtained the rights from Capcom for the Monster Hunter adaption after about five years of discussion. The two anticipate a series of Monster Hunter films. Anderson said he was drawn to the Monster Hunter property, not only because of the series' popularity, but also for the "incredibly beautiful, immersive world they've created". Anderson had already penned out a script, which would involve an American being dragged into the parallel universe in which the Monster Hunter series is set, learning how to fight monsters, and then having to deal with the situation when monsters cross back into the real world and start attacking, such as a final climactic battle at Los Angeles International Airport. At this stage of the script, the concept had been based on a young adult character from the real world called Lucas who was being sought as the hero to drive back the monsters from the real world to the fantasy one; in this form, the script would have explained why certain legends in the real world seemed to align with the monsters from the fantasy world. As the script developed over the intervening years, Anderson moved away from the "young adult" concept as the genre had become overused in Hollywood, and instead had developed a script based on the premises set by Avatar and Raiders of the Lost Ark. Anderson said that the film's storyline was primarily based on a crossover event in the game Metal Gear Solid: Peace Walker with Monster Hunter Freedom Unite in 2010, in which a military squad briefly faced monsters from the Monster Hunter series, with Milla Jovovich's Artemis and Tony Jaa's Hunter respectively replacing the video game roles of the characters Big Boss (Snake) and Trenya, stating that "I thought this was great imagery to juxtapose a man with a machine gun [Snake] against the creatures [of Monster Hunter].".

The film was formally announced in May 2018. According to Anderson, the success of the most recent game of the series at the time, Monster Hunter: World, which was developed by Capcom in early 2018 for a worldwide release rather than a limited Japanese one, led many film distributors to seek out potential for a Monster Hunter film only to discover he had already locked up the rights.

=== Casting ===
Milla Jovovich, Anderson's spouse and past lead in his Resident Evil films, was affirmed in the starring role as Captain Artemis with the announcement of the film. Anderson said that he wanted the lead character to be from outside the Monster Hunter universe as he wanted to introduce the world to the moviegoer in the same way he had experienced the games for the first time himself.

Additional characters from the Monster Hunter realm are based on those from the recent Monster Hunter: World game. On September 25, 2018, rapper T.I. and Ron Perlman were cast in the film, in which T.I. would play Link, a sniper, while Perlman would play Admiral, the leader of the Hunter's Crew. Tony Jaa was also cast in the film to play the male lead, The Hunter. In October 2018, Diego Boneta joined the film to play a character as a communications specialist. Anderson stated that while there are some novel characters in the game, reflecting on the series' custom character creator, the film would still be characters essential to the series, including the Handler and the Admiral. He also stated that they will not need to create any new monsters, as the series has enough variety that they will be able to pull from for the film.

=== Pre-production ===
Furthering on Anderson's appreciation of the game, he stated that all of the armor and weapons that the Hunters will wear will be based on the equipment from the game series, and will include at least one character that wears a mis-matched set of armor, which reflects on the player's ability within the game to mix and match armor sets for beneficial results. Anderson wanted to use various settings in the film to match the variety in a game, though recognized that one would not see as much variety in the film as one would see in playing a Monster Hunter game for several hours. Jovovich, who stated she was also a fan of the video game series, was able to select what weapons she wanted her character to be shown with, and experimented in-game to narrow her choice to the dual blades, both as effective weapons in game and that "I thought they'd look really beautiful in an action sequence."

The monsters in the film are further based on those in the game, including the series' signature monster the Rathalos; the game series' director Kaname Fujioka and producer Ryozo Tsujimoto provided input into the film's depiction of the monsters. The movie will also feature palicos, a sentient cat-like species that assist the hunters in the game series, and will include the Meowscular Chef, a palico introduced in Monster Hunter: World that once served as the Admiral's own aide before becoming a chef. Capcom helped to establish the movie's setting, taking canonically after the events of Monster Hunter: World, in a new area of the Monster Hunter setting but incorporating facets from several of the games in the series.

=== Filming ===
Constantin Film produced the film, having planned to start production in late 2017 or early 2018, but later confirmed during the 2018 Cannes Film Festival that production would begin in September 2018 in and around Cape Town and South Africa, with an estimated US$60 million budget. Some scenes were shot in Namibia, like Spitzkoppe and Sesriem canyon. Special effects studio Mr. X VFX, which worked on the Resident Evil films, were also involved in the production.

Principal photography began on October 5, 2018, in Cape Town, South Africa. Milla Jovovich announced on Instagram that principal photography was completed on December 19, 2018.

== Release ==
=== Marketing ===
A teaser for the film was first shown at the Shanghai International Film Festival in June 2019, along with the announcement that Toho and Tencent will oversee the film's distribution in Japan and China, respectively. The studio spent just $1.3 million on television ads in the week leading up to the film's U.S. release (compared to the $17 million Warner Bros. spent promoting Wonder Woman 1984), with Deadline Hollywood stating "likely Sony is holding back some of the minimal marketing dollars to spend this coming week".

=== Theatrical ===
Monster Hunter was released in the United States on December 18, 2020. The film was originally scheduled to be released on September 4, 2020, but was delayed to April 23, 2021, due to the COVID-19 pandemic, before being moved up to December 30, then finally the Christmas date. Sony yet again altered the film's release date in the United States in early December after the film's troublesome release in China, moving its release to December 18, 2020. The film was theatrically released in Japan by Toho-Towa on March 26, 2021.

=== Home media ===
The film was released by Sony Pictures Home Entertainment on digital on February 16, 2021, with the Blu-ray, 4K Blu-ray, and DVD released on March 2, 2021.

== Reception ==
=== Box office ===
As of September 24, 2024, Monster Hunter has grossed $15.2 million in the United States and Canada, and $32.7 million in other territories, for a worldwide total of $47.9 million.

The film released alongside Fatale, and was projected to gross around $3 million in its opening weekend. It grossed $800,000 on its first day of release in the United States and Canada, opening in second behind holdover The Croods: A New Age. It went on to debut to $2.2 million from 1,738 theaters, lower than expected but still topping the box office and dethroning A New Age. Following the weekend, Variety wrote that the film "looks to lose money in its theatrical run." In the film's second weekend it fell 48.9%, grossing $1.1 million, then made $1.3 million in its third weekend, finishing fourth both times.

The film debuted to $2.7 million from five countries in its opening weekend. It made $5.3 million from China before being pulled from theaters, although the total was not added to the global total. It made $1.3 million over its second weekend, remaining in first place in Taiwan ($610,000) and Saudi Arabia ($310,000).

=== Critical response ===
The Indian Express described the critical response as "mixed", while Game Rant called it "negative". Screen Rant reported a "mixed to negative" response, with praise for its action sequences and visual effects but criticism of film's "oversaturated genre trappings" as well as its direction and editing.

On review aggregator Rotten Tomatoes, 44% of critics have given the film a positive review, with an average rating of 4.9/10. The website's critics consensus reads: "Monster Hunter is mostly a mindless blur of action, held together by the slenderest threads of dialogue and plot – and exactly what many viewers will be looking for." On Metacritic, the film has a weighted average score of 47 out of 100 based on reviews from 22 critics, indicating "mixed or average reviews". Audiences polled by PostTrak, gave the film 63%, with 41% saying they would definitely recommend it.

Peter Debruge of Variety wrote, "There will be critics who can tell you who these characters are, or what's up with the 'new world' where monsters live, or why those of us in the 'old world' should be worried about them, but that information is not presented in this visually interesting but narratively anemic motion picture (nor the press notes, for that matter), so please accept my apologies in advance: This review will likely be about as coherent as the film itself." David Ehrlich of IndieWire, gave the film a grade of D− and said, "Series fans will feel cheated by such a chintzy and incurious take on something they love, while the rest of us will be left wondering how the source material earned itself any fans in the first place."

=== Chinese controversy ===
Just after the Chinese release on December 4, 2020, the film caused an uproar on Chinese social media because of a scene in which Jin's character jokingly asks: "Look at my knees!", and to the question "What kind of knees are these?", he replies: "Chi-knees!". Chinese viewers interpreted this as a reference to the racist playground chant "Chinese, Japanese, dirty knees", and therefore as an insult to Chinese people. The film was removed from circulation, and Chinese authorities censored references to it online. Tencent had reportedly prepared modified versions of the films omitting the line but even these showings were pulled. The reaction to the film also caused Chinese users to review bomb Monster Hunter: World in reference to the lines.

Constantin Film apologized for the dialogue and stated they will remove the dialogue from the film before it is re-released. Jin said that for his character, the line was "to proudly proclaim he is a Chinese soldier, not just his knees, but his arms, his head, his heart". Anderson stated that "It was never our intention to send a message of discrimination or disrespect to anyone. To the contrary – at its heart our movie is about unity", and that the line had been removed from all international versions of the film prior to their releases.

=== Accolades ===
It received a nomination at the 19th Visual Effects Society Awards, in the category Outstanding Effects Simulations in a Photoreal Feature.

== Future ==
In November 2020, Paul W. S. Anderson talked about a possible sequel saying "There are hundreds of monsters [in the game]. I can only use five or six of them in the movie. So it's a big, fun world that I think we've only just started to scratch the surface of." Milla Jovovich added to the discussion saying "Definitely, we would love to make another one. Hopefully, people are going to love it because I know Paul [W. S. Anderson] would love to make a sequel. I mean, he's already writing something."

== See also ==
- List of films based on video games
