= Saint Kotar =

- Developer(s): The-Mark Entertainment
- Publisher(s): Soedesco
- Director(s): Marko Tominić
- Producer(s): Marko Tominić
- Designer(s): Marko Tominić
- Programmer(s): Luka Maljić; Dawud Albouz; Goran Vinković
- Artist(s): Mirko Ćalušić; Luka Stojanac
- Writer(s): Marko Tominić
- Composer(s): Jurica Buljević; Borna Buljević
- Engine: Unity
- Platform(s): Microsoft Windows; Nintendo Switch; PlayStation 4; PlayStation 5; Xbox One; Xbox Series X/S; macOS; Linux
- Release: Microsoft Windows; October 28, 2021; Nintendo Switch, PS4, PS5, Xbox One, Xbox Series X/S; November 22, 2022 macOS, Linux; September 02, 2022
- Genre(s): Point-and-click adventure
- Mode(s): Single-player

Saint Kotar is a psychological horror detective point & click adventure game with branching storylines and multiple endings, set in a hand-painted world. Developed by Croatian independent studio The-Mark Entertainment (formerly known as Red Martyr Entertainment) and published by Soedesco, it was released for Microsoft Windows on October 28, 2021, Mac and Linux on September 2, 2022 and consoles, in both digital and physical forms, on November 22, 2022.

== Gameplay ==
The game takes place in the rural town of Sveti Kotar in Croatia, where two characters, Benedek Dohnany and Nikolay Kalyakin, uncover a series of murders that are connected to witchcraft.

The player controls both characters and can influence the outcome of conversations, plot and fate of NPC, by choosing different dialog options and making decisions. Furthermore, the player can discover more than 110 locations, find and use special items to solve puzzles and quests and unlock subplots to learn more about the lore and background story. Seven secret locations, if uncovered, give all of the above and unlock rare achievements.

== Story ==
Two godly men, Benedek and his brother-in-law Nikolay, wake up in a house in Sveti Kotar after having nightmares. Together they attempt to find Benedek's sister Viktoria, who has mysteriously disappeared.

== Development ==
The studio first started working on the free prologue to the main game Saint Kotar: The Yellow Mask, which was released June 18, 2020. It was described by The Escapist writer as a "strong foundation for an extremely creepy mystery". The game was written in English and was translated into 14 different languages. Its release was on the same day of the Kickstarter campaign launch, with the goal to show what the studio is capable of creating the vision they have for the main game and to attract players to back the project on Kickstarter. In agreement with publisher Soedesco, The-Mark Entertainment decided to delist it from all stores in September 2021, as it was deemed obsolete due to many technical and creative changes that were made during development of the main game.

Development of the main game was successfully funded through a Kickstarter campaign The campaign started June 18, 2020 where backers could choose from 20 different funding options, each with rewards catering for all tastes and budgets, some of which included a physical copy of the game as well as other various physical and digital goodies (all shipped as of January 10, 2023). By closing date of the campaign on July 25, 2020, and with the help of 1,163 backers, €50,178 in total were raised and the game was fully funded. On 6 July 2021, The-Mark announced the partnership with Soedesco, an independent publisher/developer/distributor founded in 2002 in Rotterdam, the Netherlands, to bring the game to PC and consoles.

=== Post-release support ===
The-Mark Entertainment has provided post-release support and patches to fix issues reported by players. Additional endings, tweaks to the existing ones, added cut scenes, animations, sounds, achievements, exploration, tasks and more, as well as other tweaks and more bugs fixing were added in a major update known as "The Void".

On 31 May 2022 the developer announced that the DLC, "The Ritual", is near completion and is due to be released in the second half of 2022. It will be available on all platforms. Regular updates are provided both on The-Mark Entertainment website and their Kickstarter page.

== Reception ==
Adventure Gamers gave it a mixed review criticizing its presentation and puzzles, but praising its atmospheric and detailed world, characters, story progression and optional content.

In a 3 minutes review video, Will Cruz of The Escapist, while not shying away from aspects he did not like much, gave it a mostly positive reception: "Being enthralled with the mystery and narrative made me appreciate all the title offers. (...) It's gritty, simplistic, and it doesn't shy away from its origins. If you're seeking a spooky narrative focused mystery game that integrates point and click mechanics, Saint Kotar might be right up your alley."

== Awards ==
Saint Kotar won the Croatian Game of the Year award in December 2021. The CEO of HCL.hr handed the Golden Beaver award statue to the developer in February 2022.

== Interactive comic books ==
These are stories about characters players came across while playing Saint Kotar.

Saint Kotar: The Crawling Man is the first installment in the series titled Saint Kotar: Tales from the Cursed Valley, released on December 2, 2022 for PC Windows, Mac and Linux.

Apple (iPhone, iPad, Apple Tv) and Google Play (for Phone, Tablet, Tv) stores, released on December 28. 2022.

Features: animated interactive panels, full controller support, achievements Windows, Mac and Linux), cloud saves (Windows, Mac and Linux, mobile devices have panels saves), sound effects and soundtracks.

The Crawling man tells the story of Rudolf Mojsek, a respected and beloved teacher and man of faith. Nicknamed 'Mojse' by his students, his life takes a turn for the worse as he becomes a vengeful cult leader.
