= Antebellum (film) =

2020 by Gerard Bush and Christopher Renz

- Theatrical release poster
- Directed by: Gerard Bush; Christopher Renz
- Written by: Gerard Bush; Christopher Renz
- Produced by: Raymond Mansfield; Sean McKittrick; Zev Forman; Gerard Bush; Christopher Renz; Lezlie Wills
- Starring: Janelle Monáe; Eric Lange; Jena Malone; Jack Huston; Kiersey Clemons; Gabourey Sidibe
- Cinematography: Pedro Luque
- Edited by: John Axelrad
- Music by: Nate Wonder; Roman Gianarthur
- Production companies: QC Entertainment; Bush+Renz
- Distributed by: Lionsgate
- Release date: September 18, 2020
- Running time: 106 minutes
- Country: United States
- Language: English
- Budget: $10 million
- Box office: $7.8 million

Antebellum is a 2020 American horror thriller film written and directed by Gerard Bush and Christopher Renz in their feature directorial debuts. The film stars Janelle Monáe, Eric Lange, Jena Malone, Jack Huston, Kiersey Clemons, and Gabourey Sidibe. The film follows a 21st-century Black woman who wakes to find herself in a Southern US slave plantation from which she must escape.

Antebellum was released in the United States through premium video on demand on September 18, 2020, and theatrically in several other countries. The film received mixed reviews from critics, who criticized the depiction of on screen violence.

== Plot ==
In a Louisiana slave plantation run by Confederate soldiers, enslaved Black people are treated harshly and not allowed to speak unless spoken to. Those who attempt to escape are killed and their bodies burned in a crematorium. After a failed escape attempt, a black man named Eli watches as his wife is murdered and her body is placed in the crematorium. A woman who had been assisting them is brutally beaten and branded by the general until she submits to being called Eden.

A group of new enslaved Black people are brought to the plantation. Among them is a pregnant woman whom the general's daughter, Elizabeth, names Julia and places in the care of Eden. Julia asks Eden to plan an escape while Eden urges her to keep her head down. That evening, during a dinner where Julia and Eden are forced to wait on soldiers in the army, a shy Confederate soldier named Daniel is attracted to Julia and arranges to go to her cabin later. When Julia tries to play on his kindness and asks him to help her, he beats her for speaking when not spoken to, causing her to miscarry.

After being raped by the general in her cabin, Eden hears a ringing cell phone. In the modern era, a cell phone rings, awakening Eden, a renowned sociologist named Dr. Veronica Henley. She is preparing to take a trip to speak and promote her book, which is difficult because she has to leave her husband Nick and her daughter Kennedi. She has a bizarre online meeting with Elizabeth pretending to be an unctuous, interested fan or headhunter. Elizabeth praises Veronica's book but laces the conversation with condescending microaggressions and asks unsettling questions about Veronica's daughter leaving her uncomfortable, but she dismisses her feelings and cuts the meeting short.

While in Louisiana on her book tour, she meets acquaintances Dawn and Sarah and agrees to dine with them at a local restaurant. In the meantime, Elizabeth sneaks into her hotel room and steals her lipstick. Intending to return home early in the morning, Veronica leaves the restaurant in what she believes is her Uber ride, but it is a car driven by Elizabeth. Elizabeth's husband, Jasper, knocks Veronica unconscious.

At the plantation, Veronica discovers that Julia has hanged herself. Enraged, she tells Eli that they will escape that night. After being raped by the general again the following evening, she once again sneaks out of her cabin and steals the general's phone. Before she can call for help, she is interrupted by an intoxicated Daniel and another soldier who find the phone but are not suspicious, believing it dropped out of the general's bag.

When he is alone, Eli kills Daniel with a hatchet and retrieves the cell phone. As the phone can only be unlocked with facial recognition, Veronica returns to the cabin to find the general and is surprised to find he is awake. The general attacks both of them, and Eli is subsequently killed trying to protect Veronica. She stabs the general with his own bayonet and unlocks the phone, then uses GPS to send her location to her husband. Intending to hide the general in the crematorium, she is interrupted by Jasper. Veronica lures him and another soldier into the crematorium and sets fire to it, leaving the three men to burn to death as she steals the general's horse and rides off.

Elizabeth pursues Veronica on horseback and reveals that she handpicked every enslaved Black person on the plantation except for Veronica, whom she kidnapped at her father's insistence. Veronica knocks Elizabeth off her horse and puts a rope around her neck, dragging her until she hits the base of a Robert E. Lee statue, breaking her neck.

Veronica flees the pursuing soldiers into the chaos of a battle, revealing that the so-called plantation is part of a Civil War reenactment park called Antebellum, owned by Senator Blake Denton, who is posing as the general. Denton and his comrades intended to use the park to recreate chattel slavery by kidnapping and trafficking African-Americans. Veronica finally escapes as the police arrive.

During the credits, the park is shut down by the FBI, the enslaved Black people are rescued, and the park is destroyed.

== Cast ==
- Janelle Monáe as Veronica Henley/Eden
- Eric Lange as Senator Blake Denton/The General
- Jena Malone as Elizabeth
- Jack Huston as Jasper
- Kiersey Clemons as Julia
- Gabourey Sidibe as Dawn
- Marque Richardson as Nick Henley
- Tongayi Chirisa as Professor Tarasai/Eli
- Robert Aramayo as Daniel
- Lily Cowles as Sarah
- London Boyce as Kennedi Henley
- Arabella Landrum as Little Blonde Girl
- Achok Majak as Ghianna Queen
- T.C. Matherne as Purcell

== Production ==
In March 2019, it was announced Janelle Monáe had joined the cast of the film, with Gerard Bush and Christopher Renz directing from a screenplay they wrote. Ray Mansfield and Sean McKittrick serve as producers on the film under their QC Entertainment banner, and Lionsgate are distributors. In April 2019, Eric Lange, Jena Malone, Jack Huston, Kiersey Clemons, Tongayi Chirisa, Gabourey Sidibe, Robert Aramayo and Lily Cowles joined the cast of the film. In May 2019, Marque Richardson joined the cast of the film.

Principal photography began in May 2019 around New Orleans, Louisiana.

== Release ==
Antebellum was released through video on demand in the United States on September 18, 2020, while still playing in theaters in select countries. This includes a theatrical release in Australia on October 1, 2020. The film was originally scheduled to be released on April 24, 2020, but was pulled off the schedule due to the COVID-19 pandemic, then was rescheduled to August 21, 2020, before being pulled off the release schedule again in July 2020.

== Reception ==
=== VOD rentals ===
In its debut weekend, Antebellum was the number one most rented title across film and television on Amazon Prime Video, and number one rented film on FandangoNow and Apple TV, and third on Google Play. IndieWire estimated that if about 500,000 homes rented the film, it would result in $8 million for the studio. In its second weekend the film topped the Amazon Prime Video, FandangoNow and Spectrum film charts, while finishing second at Google Play and sixth at Apple TV, and remained in the top three across most platforms in its third weekend. In October 2020, The Hollywood Reporter said the film was the sixth-most-popular PVOD title amid the COVID-19 pandemic.

=== Critical response ===
On review aggregator Rotten Tomatoes, the film holds an approval rating of 30% based on 205 reviews, with an average rating of 4.8/10. The website's critical consensus reads: "Antebellum fails to connect its images with any meaning, making for a largely unpleasant experience lacking any substantial scares." On Metacritic, the film has a weighted average score of 43 out of 100 based on 40 reviews, indicating "mixed or average" reviews.

Peter Debruge from Variety called it "A mind blowing thriller". Stephanie Zacharek of Time wrote "Even if we didn't live in a country where a shockingly large fraction of people think Confederate monuments are A-O.K., Gerard Bush and Christopher Renz's Antebellum would resonate like the boom of a Union Army cannon". David Ehrlich of IndieWire gave the film a "C+" and wrote, "An artful and provocative movie about the enduring horror of America's original sin, Antebellum can't follow through on its own concept." Writing for The Hollywood Reporter, Jourdain Searles said the film was "more interested in making a point than digging deep" and "In the end, Antebellum is undone by a lack of empathy and emotion. It has no real perspective on the past and thus fails to make any real impact on the present."

In a largely negative review, Angelica Jade Bastién, writing for Vulture, criticized the film's exploitation of black suffering and emotional manipulation, writing, "It is full of not only aesthetic and narrative failures but moral ones: It implicitly argues that depictions of suffering are the best means of understanding what it means to be Black in America.”

=== Accolades ===
Peter Debruge included the film on his list of "best films of 2020" for Variety, praising its cinematic quality, effective storytelling and social relevancy.

Year	Award	Category	Recipients	Result	Ref.
2020	Fright Meter Awards	Best Cinematography	Pedro Luque	Nominated	
2020	Sunset Film Circle Awards	Scene Stealer	Gabourey Sidibe	Nominated	
2021	Black Reel Awards	Outstanding Supporting Actress	Gabourey Sidibe	Nominated	
2021	Hawaii Film Critics Society Awards	Best Horror Film		Nominated	
2021	Hollywood Music in Media Awards	Best Original Score in a Horror Film	Nate Wonder and Roman GianArthur	Nominated	
2021	NAACP Image Awards	Outstanding Actress in a Motion Picture	Janelle Monáe	Nominated	
2021	NAACP Image Awards	Outstanding Supporting Actress in a Motion Picture	Gabourey Sidibe	Nominated	
2021	Phoenix Critics Circle Awards	Best Horror Film		Nominated	
2021	Women Film Critics Circle Awards	Courage in Acting	Janelle Monáe	Won	
2021	Women Film Critics Circle Awards	Best Female Action Hero	Janelle Monáe	Won	
2021	Women Film Critics Circle Awards	Best Movie About Women		Nominated	
2021	Women Film Critics Circle Awards	Josephine Baker Award		Nominated	
