= The Boy in the Iron Box =

Upcoming American horror film

- Directed by: David Prior
- Screenplay by: David Prior
- Based on: The Boy in the Iron Box by: Guillermo del Toro; Chuck Hogan
- Produced by: Guillermo del Toro; J. Miles Dale
- Starring: Rupert Friend; Kevin Durand; Jaeden Martell; Chris Petrovski; Aksel Hennie; Arnas Fedaravicius; Eugene Prokofiev; Jóhannes Haukur Jóhannesson; Julian Kostov
- Production company: Necropia Entertainment
- Distributed by: Netflix
- Country: United States
- Language: English

The Boy in the Iron Box is an upcoming American supernatural horror film written and directed by David Prior. It is based on the serialized novella authored by Guillermo del Toro and Chuck Hogan. The film stars Rupert Friend, Kevin Durand, Jaeden Martell, Chris Petrovski, Aksel Hennie, Arnas Fedaravicius, Eugene Prokofiev, Jóhannes Haukur Jóhannesson, and Julian Kostov.

== Premise ==
A plane carrying a team of mercenaries crash-lands on a remote snowy summit. When they come across a maze-like stone fortress, it's no refuge from the wolves and the freezing wind. As terror takes a new shape, the real battle for survival begins.

== Cast ==
- Rupert Friend
- Kevin Durand
- Jaeden Martell
- Chris Petrovski
- Aksel Hennie
- Arnas Fedaravicius
- Eugene Prokofiev
- Jóhannes Haukur Jóhannesson
- Julian Kostov

== Production ==
In May 2025, an adaptation of Guillermo del Toro and Chuck Hogan's novella The Boy in the Iron Box was optioned for Netflix, to be produced by del Toro's Necropia Entertainment. In September, David Prior was hired to write and direct the film The Boy in the Iron Box, while Rupert Friend, Kevin Durand, and Jaeden Martell were cast in undisclosed roles. The following month, Chris Petrovski, Aksel Hennie, Arnas Fedaravicius, Eugene Prokofiev, Jóhannes Haukur Jóhannesson, and Julian Kostov rounded out the cast. Principal photography began in Toronto on October 20, 2025, and wrapped on January 13, 2026.
