= David Prior (director) =

American director, screenwriter, producer, and editor

- Born: January 6, 1969 (age 57); Cambridge, Massachusetts, U.S.
- Occupations: Film director; Screenwriter; Producer; Editor
- Years active: 2008–present
- Notable work: The Empty Man; Voir

David Prior (born January 6, 1969) is an American filmmaker, best known for his work on the cult horror film The Empty Man, and television series such as Voir and Guillermo del Toro's Cabinet of Curiosities. He has also directed and produced making-of documentaries for films, most notably the works of David Fincher and Michael Bay.

== Career ==
After directing documentaries of various David Fincher films for over ten years, Prior helmed his first independent short film AM1200 in 2008. In February 2016, he was hired to write and direct his feature film debut, the supernatural horror film The Empty Man, based on the graphic novel of the same name from Boom! Studios. In September 2021, he was hired to direct an episode on the Netflix series Guillermo del Toro's Cabinet of Curiosities. In December 2021, he co-created, executive produced, and directed two episodes of Fincher's Netflix series Voir. By September 2025, he was hired to write and direct the Netflix film The Boy in the Iron Box, based on the short story of the same name by Guillermo del Toro.

== Filmography ==
Short film

Year	Title	Director	Writer	Producer	Editor	Sound Designer	Ref.
2008	AM1200	Yes	Yes	Yes	Yes	Yes	

Feature film

Year	Title	Director	Writer	Editor	Notes / Ref.
2020	The Empty Man	Yes	Yes	Yes	
TBA	The Boy in the Iron Box	Yes	Yes	No	Post-production

Television

Year	Title	Notes	Ref.
2021	Voir	Episodes: "Summer of the Shark" and "But I Don't Like Him" (Also writer and executive producer)	
2022	Guillermo del Toro's Cabinet of Curiosities	Episode: "The Autopsy"	
