= Eric Lange =

American actor (born 1973)

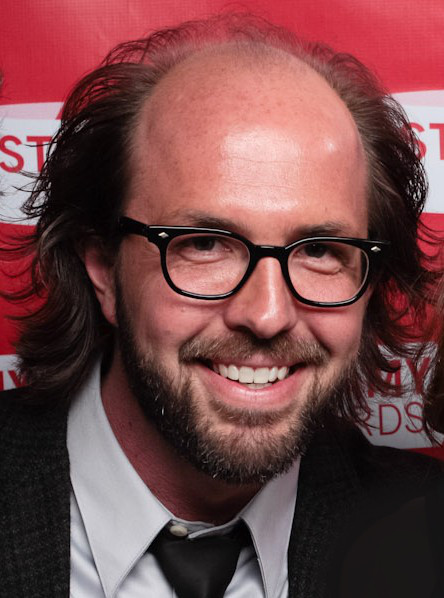
- Lange at the 2010 Streamy Awards
- Born: February 19, 1973 (age 53); Hamilton, Ohio, U.S.
- Education: Miami University (BFA)
- Occupation: Actor
- Years active: 1996–present
- Spouse: Lisa Sabatino (m. 2013)
- Children: 2

Eric Lange (born February 19, 1973) is an American character actor. He is known for his extensive work on television, where he has appeared in a wide variety of both supporting and leading roles.

Lange played the recurring roles of Stuart Radzinsky on the ABC series Lost (2009) and Erwin Sikowitz in the Nickelodeon series Victorious (2010–13), and had his mainstream breakthrough for playing David Tate/Kenneth Hasting on the FX series The Bridge (2013). He earned acclaim for starring as Bill Stechner on the crime drama Narcos (2016), Lyle Mitchell on Showtime's Escape at Dannemora (2018) which earned a nomination for the Critics' Choice Television Award for Best Supporting Actor in a Movie/Miniseries, Lou Burke on the Netflix original series Brand New Cherry Flavor (2021), Detective Gene Holcomb on the HBO series Perry Mason (2020–2022), and Byron Stallings on the Apple TV+ series Sugar (2024).

Lange's film roles include Sam Larson in the independent film AM1200 (2008), Andy Beyer in the sports drama Secretariat (2010), a cameraman in the neo-noir Nightcrawler (2014), Dr. Silverman in the comedy-drama Danny Collins (2015), Whitehurst in the neo-Western mystery Wind River (2017), Blake Denton/Him in the horror Antebellum (2020) and Ralph Seegan in the action horror Day Shift (2022).

== Early life ==
Eric Lange was born in Hamilton, Ohio and graduated from Fairfield High School and Miami University in Oxford, Ohio. He has Danish ancestry.

== Career ==
Lange's first film role came in 1996's High School High, where he played a singing waiter. Two years later, he appeared in three episodes of the daytime drama The Bold and the Beautiful. With 2001 came a guest role in the popular series Angel, and the following year he was cast in a one-episode part in Firefly.

Over the next three years, he appeared in minor roles on several television shows, including CSI, The Bernie Mac Show, Without a Trace, The Shield, and The West Wing. Lange also appeared in a 2007 episode of Entourage and appeared briefly on the short-lived NBC show Journeyman.

In 2008, he appeared in an episode of Criminal Minds, as well as in small roles in Bones and My Name Is Earl. In 2010, he appeared in two episodes of Weeds.

Lange portrayed Manager Erik on the television comedy Easy to Assemble. He has also guest starred on Law & Order: Special Victims Unit, and My Name Is Earl, and from 2010 to 2013 portrayed Mr. Sikowitz, an eccentric acting teacher, on Nickelodeon's teen show Victorious. On June 11, 2011, Lange guest starred on iCarly in "iParty with Victorious", the first ever iCarly and Victorious crossover event.

Lange also portrayed a distraught basketball coach in the ABC television show Modern Family. In 2006, he guest starred on Cold Case, in which he played "Lyle".

In 2010, Lange portrayed John Skrzynsky in the HBO movie You Don't Know Jack, the biography of controversial doctor Jack Kevorkian. His role was Andy Beyer in the Disney film Secretariat. Lange had a recurring role in Weeds as journalist Vaughn Coleman.

In 2013, he played a role in Grimm in Season 2, Episode 16. In 2015, he played Dr. Silverman in Danny Collins.

The year following, he appeared as Officer Smith in Fear, Inc. He had a main role on the Netflix drama series Narcos as Bill Stechner, a corrupt CIA agent, which earned him recognition.

In November 2019, it was announced that Lange would appear in a main role on the Netflix horror drama miniseries Brand New Cherry Flavor. The miniseries was released on August 13, 2021.

== Personal life ==
He is married to Lisa Sabatino, who works as a sales rep in California. They married on November 9, 2013 and have two children. They live in Sherman Oaks, Los Angeles. Lange quit drinking around 2021.

== Filmography ==
=== Film ===
Year	Title	Role	Notes
1996	High School High	Singing Waiter	
2008	AM1200	Sam Larson	Independent film
2010	Secretariat	Andy Beyer	
2012	Blue Like Jazz	The Hobo	
2014	Nightcrawler	Ace Video Cameraman	
2015	Danny Collins	Dr. Silverman	
2016	Fear, Inc.	Officer Smith	
2017	Wind River	Dr. Whitehurst	
2020	Antebellum	Blake Denton/Him	
2022	Day Shift	Ralph Seeger	
2024	Caddo Lake	Daniel	
2025	Thunderbolts*	Doctor Houdson	

=== Television ===
Year	Title	Role	Notes
1998	The Bold and the Beautiful	Dr. Larson	3 episodes
2001	Angel	Sad-eyed Demon	Episode: "Happy Anniversary"
2002	Firefly	Fed	Episode: "The Train Job"
2003	Wanda at Large	Stage Manager	Episode: "Hurricane Hawkins"
2003–2004	All of Us	Bill	Episodes: "Uncle Marcus Comes to Dinner" and "Catering"
2004	The Shield	Robert	Episode: "Streaks and Tips"
2004	Oliver Beene	Doctor	Episode: "Oliver & the Otters"
2004	The West Wing	Paul Tyminski	Episode: "The Hubbert Peak"
2004	LAX	Doctor	4 episodes
2005	JAG	Brad Weston	Episode: "Automatic for the People"
2005	The Bernie Mac Show	Tony	Episode: "You Got Served"
2005	Judging Amy	Dr. Wright	Episode: "10,000 Steps"
2005	Without a Trace	Warren Stipe	Episode: "Transitions"
2005	ER	Rod Stillman	Episode: "Nobody's Baby"
2005	CSI: NY	Simon Winger	Episode: "Jamalot"
2006	NCIS	William Lafferty	Episode: "Deception"
2006	Cold Case	Lyle	Episode: "Willkommen"
2006	Ghost Whisperer	Driver	Episode: "Free Fall"
2007	Entourage	Director	Episode: "The Young and the Stoned"
2007	Journeyman	Sheriff	Episode: "Blowback"
2007	Burn Notice	Bill Reese	Episode: "Old Friends"
2008	Boston Legal	George Parkes	Episode: "Rescue Me"
2008	Criminal Minds	Brian Matloff	Episode: "Tabula Rasa"
2008	Bones	Steve Jackson	Episode: "The Con Man in the Meth Lab"
2008	My Name Is Earl	Mr. Fischer	Episode: "Orphan Earl"
2008	Law & Order	Cab Driver	1 episode
2008	Numb3rs	Skipper	Episode: "Charlie Don't Surf"
2008–12	Easy to Assemble	Erik Lindstrom	Main role
2009	Lost	Stuart Radzinsky	7 episodes
2009	Monk	Goggle-wearing UFO Enthusiast	Episode: "Mr. Monk and the UFO"
2010	Modern Family	Coach Stupak	Episode: "Benched"
2010	Law & Order: Special Victims Unit	Bryce Kelton	Episode: "Witness"
2010	Twentysixmiles	Sean "Murph" Murphy	6 episodes
2010	Dark Blue	David Lantz	Episode: "Home Sweet Home"
2010	Weeds	Vaughn Coleman	4 episodes
2010–13	Victorious	Erwin Sikowitz	Recurring role; 27 episodes
2011	CSI: Miami	Patrick Lieber	Episode: "Stoned Cold"
2011	Chuck	Colin Davis	Episode: "Chuck Versus the Hack Off"
2011	iCarly	Erwin Sikowitz	Episode: "iParty with Victorious"
2012	Figure It Out	Himself	1 episode; game show
2012	Fringe	Gael Manfretti	Episode: "In Absentia"
2013	Grimm	Dominick Spinner	Episode: "Nameless"
2013	Touch	Dr. Stanley	Episode: "Broken"
2013	Castle	Simon Warburg	Episode: "The Human Factor"
2013	Sam & Cat	Erwin Sikowitz	Episode: "#MommaGoomer"
2013	Cult	Cameron / Steven Rae	6 episodes
2013–2014	The Bridge	Kenneth Hasting	Recurring role; 11 episodes
2014	Once Upon a Time	Prince Leopold	Episode: "Bleeding Through"
2014	Stalker	Larry Meyers	Episode: "Pilot"
2015	Grey's Anatomy	Steven Tanner	Episode: "Sledgehammer"
2016–17	Narcos	Bill Stechner	Main role (season 2)
2018	Waco	Ron Engelman	Miniseries
2018	Escape at Dannemora	Lyle Mitchell	Miniseries
2018, 2020	Narcos: Mexico	Bill Stechner	Episodes: "Rafa, Rafa, Rafa!" and "The Big Dig"
2019	Unbelievable	Detective Parker	Miniseries
2019	The Man in the High Castle	Bill Whitcroft	Recurring role; 5 episodes (season 4)
2020, 2023	Perry Mason	Detective Holcomb	Recurring (season 1); main role (season 2)
2021	Brand New Cherry Flavor	Lou Burke	Main role; limited series
2021	The Premise	Eli Spector	Episode: "Butt Plug"
2023–24	Beacon 23	Milan Aleph	Recurring role; 7 episodes
2024	Sugar	Byron Stallings	Recurring role; 5 episodes
2025	Invasion	Jack Hollander	Recurring role; 4 episodes
2025	Law & Order	Chris Damaso	Episode: "Two and Twenty"
2026	Lucky	AD Peter Kershaw	Recurring role; 4 episodes
2026	Hollywood Arts	Erwin Sikowitz	Episode: "Back to School"
TBA	El Gato	Simon Casimir / The Nazarite	Main role

== Awards and nominations ==
Year	Work	Award	Category	Result
2008	AM1200	ShockerFest Awards	Best Actor – Horror Genre	Nominated
2010	Easy to Assemble	Streamy Awards	Best Ensemble Cast in a Web Series	Won
2017	Wind River	IABM Awards	Best Cast	Nominated
2019	Escape at Dannemora	Critics' Choice Awards	Best Supporting Actor in a Movie/Miniseries	Nominated
2019	Escape at Dannemora	Online Film & Television Association	Best Ensemble in a Motion Picture or Limited Series	Nominated
