= Easy (2003 film) =

- Directed by: Jane Weinstock
- Written by: Jane Weinstock
- Produced by: Gloria Norris
- Starring: Marguerite Moreau; Brían F. O'Byrne; Naveen Andrews
- Cinematography: Paul Ryan
- Edited by: Robert Hoffman; Lauren Zuckerman
- Music by: Grant-Lee Phillips
- Production companies: Magic Lamp; Curb Entertainment; Over Easy Productions
- Distributed by: Screen Media Films
- Release date: September 10, 2003 (Toronto)
- Running time: 99 minutes
- Country: United States
- Language: English

Easy is a 2003 American independent romantic comedy film written and directed by Jane Weinstock and starring Marguerite Moreau, Brían F. O'Byrne and Naveen Andrews. It is Weinstock's directorial debut.

== Plot ==
Jamie Harris is a neurotic, bright 25 year-old with a career naming peculiar consumer products. Though she gives them their identities, she's rather confused about her own. After dating a string of jerks, she's bewildered about whom to trust or how to find true intimacy. When two seemingly honorable men orbit around her, Jamie must confront what she is most afraid of.

== Cast ==
- Marguerite Moreau as Jamie Harris
- Vanessa Marano as young Jamie
- Brían F. O'Byrne as Mick McCabe
- Naveen Andrews as John Kalicharan
- Emily Deschanel as Laura Harris
- Caroline Goodall as Sandy Clarke
- D.B. Woodside as Martin Mars
- Lanette Ware as Tanya
- John Rothman as Lawrence Harris

== Reception ==
The film has a 59% rating on Rotten Tomatoes.
