= Monuments (film) =

2020 film by Jack C. Newell

- Directed by: Jack C. Newell
- Written by: Jack C. Newell
- Produced by: Jack C. Newell; Angie Gaffney; Matt Hyland
- Starring: Ted Daniels; Marguerite Moreau; Rivkah Reyes; Joel Murray; Javier Muñoz
- Cinematography: Stephanie Dufford
- Edited by: David Burkart
- Music by: Nick Takénobu Ogawa
- Production companies: Black Apple Media; ZAXIE
- Distributed by: Row House Films
- Release date: June 4, 2021
- Running time: 94 minutes
- Language: English

Monuments is a film written and directed by Jack C. Newell. It stars Marguerite Moreau, David Sullivan, Joel Murray, and Javier Muñoz. The film tells the story of Ted Daniels (Sullivan), a young widower grappling with the death of his wife Laura (Moreau).

== Plot ==
Laura and Ted are enjoying a dysfunctional marriage in Boulder, Colorado; teaching at the university, drinking at the local tiki bar, and barely tolerating Laura's odd family. The couple is recently reunited after a brief estrangement when Laura is killed in a car accident.

Paralyzed with grief, Ted carries her ashes under his arm and begins seeing her everywhere he goes. Aided by Laura's suitor Howl, Laura's family takes matter into their own hands by stealing the ashes from Ted and heading to their family's resting place to say their goodbyes.

Ted chases them down, and at the urging of Laura's ghost, he steals her ashes and Howl's truck and heads out on a cross country road trip to lay her to rest at the Field Museum of Natural History in Chicago. Along the way, Ted meets a quirky cast of characters that seduce, annoy, confuse, and sidetrack him while Laura's family and Howl are in hot pursuit.

== Release ==
The film premiered at the 2020 Nashville Film Festival, where it won an Audience Award for US Independent film.
