= Event Horizon: Dark Descent =

2025–2026 comic book series

- Cover art.

Publication information
- Publisher: IDW Publishing
- Genre: Science fiction horror
- Publication date: August 20, 2025 — February 4, 2026
- No. of issues: 5
- Main character: Event Horizon (Paramount Pictures)

Creative team
- Written by: Christian Ward
- Artist: Tristan Jones
- Letterer: Alex Ray
- Colorist: Pip Martin
- Editor: Nicolas Niño

Event Horizon: Dark Descent is an American science fiction horror limited comic book series that was published from 2025 to 2026 by IDW Publishing.

== Publication history ==
In October 2024, it was announced that Event Horizon: Dark Descent, a comic series from IDW Dark, set in the Event Horizon universe, was in the works, alongside comic series from the 30 Days of Night franchise, A Quiet Place franchise, the Smile franchise, Sleepy Hollow, and The Twilight Zone franchise.

== Synopsis ==
The series takes place before the events of the film Event Horizon and follows the crew of the titular ship.

=== Characters ===
- John Kilpack: The captain of the Event Horizon.
- Peter Adjei: A physician aboard the Event Horizon.
- Nia Atwell: The communications officer aboard the Event Horizon.
- Devlin Conners: The navigation officer aboard the Event Horizon.
- Jennifer Kwon: A quantum physicist aboard the Event Horizon.
- Yusef Quinn: The chief engineer aboard the Event Horizon.
- Sara Tsang: A crew member of the Event Horizon.
- William Weir: An astrophysics engineer who designed the Event Horizon and its gravity drive system.
- Anderson: A member of Project New Horizon.
- Paimon: The king of the Chaos Realm and the one behind the ship's corruption, making him responsible for the 1997 film's events.
- Claire Weir: The late wife of William Weir.

=== Plot ===
==== Issue 1 ====
Ten months before the first mission of the Event Horizon, Dr William Weir attends the funeral of his wife, Claire, who killed herself. It is implied that a demonic entity haunted her, although Weir blames himself for being absent due to his dedication to building the Gravity Drive. This engine will allow the Event Horizon to travel vast distances instantaneously. He is haunted by dreams of his disfigured wife telling him to "Come find me". Rather than taking time to grieve, Weir returns to work, guided by the dreams.

The day before the Event Horizon's mission, the crew prepare: quantum physicist Jennifer Kwon, who is haunted by the death of her twin sister; Lieutenant Sara Tsang, who is fleeing an abusive partner on Earth; Doctor Peter Adjei, who is secretly dying from cancer; Captain John Kilpack, a devout Christian struggling with his deceased father's disappointment; Chief Engineer Yusef Quinn, who struggles around people due to growing up in a violent household; Communications Officer Nia Atwell; and Devlin Conners, who is hiding an unknown secret. Atwell receives a communication from Earth informing her that Victoria Police intend to arrest Conners for an incident that killed a child. When Atwell tells Conners she intends to inform the captain, the pair struggle and Atwell is struck in the head and killed. Meanwhile, the Event Horizon makes its first Gravity Drive jump.

==== Issue 2 ====
In the past, Conners is raised by an abusive father who regularly beats him. Conners was never sure whether his father was teaching him and his brother to fight or wanted to hurt them. From these experiences, Conners learned to evade and avoid pain. He is revealed to have a history of violence and petty crime. While driving, he receives a message informing him that he has been selected as the navigator for the Event Horizon. Distracted, he strikes and kills a child before fleeing to board the ship.

In the present, the Event Horizon floats in an unknown realm surrounded by masses of flesh, giant disfigured faces, and enormous eyes. The Gravity Drive shuts down, trapping the crew. Kwon is sent to find Atwell and Conners while the others try to keep the crew calm. Several crew members are overcome by horrifying visions that cause them to tear out their own eyes. Yusef examines the drive but finds it functioning normally, although he hears an organic hum as though it is breathing or sleeping. Searching behind a panel, he discovers a mass of flesh but is unsure whether it is real. As Kwon searches the ship, she discovers crew members overcome with either horror or lust. Yusef hears the drive awaken, from which a giant red demonic creature emerges. He claims to have many names, but has adopted the name Paimon from the thoughts of the captain who is watching via camera. Declaring itself the king of Hell, it demands he worship it through death, before handing Yusef a screwdriver and commanding him to stab himself in the brain. Kwon finds Conners beside Atwell's body before witnessing Atwell's eyeless ghost and the mutilated body of the child Conners killed standing beside her.

==== Issue 3 ====
In the past, Adjei is informed that he has cancer, but asks his doctor to keep the diagnosis from the Event Horizon project so he is not removed from the mission, wishing instead to die somewhere with a worthy view, "closer to Heaven".

In the present, the captain informs the crew they have arrived at an unknown destination of "dread" and that Yusef is dead. Kwon kicks Conners in the face and flees, with him in pursuit. The captain secures the bridge, admitting over the intercom that he is alone but has seen his dead father there with him. In the drive room, Paimon removes a blob of flesh from the hole in his abdomen, which quickly grows limbs and chases the crew, tearing them apart or absorbing them into its mass while they continue screaming for help. Most of the crew are killed. Meanwhile, Conners is led to Paimon by the ghost of the dead child and falls to his knees before him.

Reunited with Kwon and Adjei, Tsang recommends detonating the explosives connecting the fore of the ship to the Gravity Drive at the rear, but Kwon rebukes the idea, arguing they cannot return home without the drive. Adjei instead volunteers to don a spacesuit and lure the creature into an airlock before ejecting them both into space. Before he can put on his helmet, the creature blocks it, but Adjei chooses to sacrifice himself by opening the airlock and sending them both into space. Adjei dies, but the creature manages to pull itself back aboard the ship.

On the bridge, the captain is confronted by Paimon.

==== Issue 4 ====
In the past, the captain is repeatedly beaten across the knuckles by his father whenever he makes a mistake playing the piano, and his father also punishes him for his homosexuality. His father later forces him to watch hunting dogs tear apart a fox. While at college, the captain meets Jeremy and they fall in love, but when his father discovers them together, he beats Jeremy to death.

In the present, Paimon torments the captain for failing his crew before resurrecting them as they strip naked and mutilate each other in front of him. Each time the slaughter ends, Paimon simply begins the cycle again. The captain begs him to stop, but Paimon replies, "Again. Always again. Forever." The captain then sees a vision of Jeremy, who warns him not to fail the world as he failed him and to stop Paimon from entering their world. Jeremy tells the captain to send a warning, urging others not to follow the Event Horizon and to save themselves from Hell, before tearing out his own eyes.

==== Issue 5 ====
In the past, Tsang confesses to Kwon that she is fleeing her abusive husband and joined the mission to remind herself of her own strength.

In the present, Tsang is forced to repeatedly kill incarnations of her husband. The captain begs forgiveness for his failures over the intercom before instructing Tsang and Kwon to destroy the Event Horizon. Tsang proposes detonating the explosives along the concourse so the fore of the ship can function as a lifeboat. In the drive room, a heavily self-mutilated Conners tells Paimon he is ready. When he asks how the drive will be repaired, Paimon resurrects Yusef's body to complete the work. Paimon tells Conners that a light following Kwon makes him uncomfortable and orders him to worship him through violence.

With the explosives nearly armed, Kwon tells Tsang that although she is not religious, she has been thinking about the concept of "spooky distance", a phenomenon in which two or more particles remain connected in an intangible way. She confesses that years earlier she and her sister Emma fell out over a man and, when Emma became terminally ill, she refused to help her and has regretted it ever since. Kwon believes she may belong in Hell, but fears Emma has been dragged there with her. In the drive room, the pair are attacked by Conners, but Tsang stabs him to death. The ghost of the child tells them Paimon will simply resurrect him.

Paimon's monstrous creature returns and grabs Tsang, slowly absorbing her into itself. Paimon caresses Kwon, telling her they will return home together to see her parents, but he is driven back by a blinding light, which Kwon recognises as Emma. Tsang urges Kwon to detonate the explosives, destroying the Event Horizon. Kwon finds herself floating in a white void, where Emma's spirit embraces her and tells her she is forgiven before they both disappear.

On Earth, Weir dreams he is aboard the Event Horizon with Claire, who again tells him to come to her. She says that Paimon is the lord of resurrection and that Weir has put enough of his soul into the ship for Paimon to restore it. Paimon is then seen in a void, piecing the ship back together. Claire tells Weir that the ship is like the child they never had, that she remains in Hell, and that he must come and find her as Weir cries that it is only a dream.

== Issues ==
Issue #	Title	Written by	Drawn by	Colored by	Lettered by	Publication date
1	Event Horizon: Dark Descent #1	Christian Ward	Tristan Jones	Pip Martin	Alex Ray	August 20, 2025
2	Event Horizon: Dark Descent #2	Christian Ward	Tristan Jones	Pip Martin	Alex Ray	October 8, 2025
3	Event Horizon: Dark Descent #3	Christian Ward	Tristan Jones	Pip Martin	Alex Ray	November 12, 2025
4	Event Horizon: Dark Descent #4	Christian Ward	Tristan Jones	Pip Martin	Alex Ray	December 24, 2025
5	Event Horizon: Dark Descent #5	Christian Ward	Tristan Jones	Pip Martin	Alex Ray	February 4, 2026

== Sequel ==
A sequel comic, Event Horizon: Inferno, set 200 years after the events of the film Event Horizon, released in April 2026.
