= The Janus Syndrome =

1981 novel by Steven E. McDonald

The Janus Syndrome is a novel by Steven E. McDonald published in 1981.

== Reception ==
Greg Costikyan reviewed The Janus Syndrome in Ares Magazine #12 and commented that "The writing is poor (and the number of grammatical errors I caught says nothing good about Bantam's proofreading staff). All in all, avoid."

== Reviews ==
- Review by Mark Owings (1982) in Science Fiction & Fantasy Book Review, #3, April 1982
- Review by John Duffty (1982) in Paperback Inferno, Volume 5, Number 6
