= Event Horizon: Inferno =

2026 comic book series

- Cover art for issue #1.

Publication information
- Publisher: IDW Publishing
- Genre: Science fiction horror
- Publication date: April 2026 — present
- Main character: Event Horizon (Paramount Pictures)

Creative team
- Written by: Christian Ward
- Artist: Robert Carey

Event Horizon: Inferno is a 2026 American science fiction horror limited comic book series from IDW Publishing. It is a sequel to Event Horizon: Dark Descent.

== Publication history ==
In October 2024, it was announced that comic series from IDW Dark, set in the Event Horizon universe, was in the works, alongside comic series from the 30 Days of Night franchise, A Quiet Place franchise, the Smile franchise, Sleepy Hollow, and The Twilight Zone franchise.

== Synopsis ==
The series takes place in 2247, 200 years after the events of the film Event Horizon. The series follows a billionaire who seeks to salvage the remains of the Event Horizon near Neptune.

=== Characters ===
- Daniel Durante: 52 years old, Billionaire and owner and CEO of earth's largest space travel corporation; A rich character who doesn't mind risking the lives of others in his quest.
- Anabelle Durante: Daniel's second wife, 100% AI-driven synthetic.
- Skylar Durante: Daniel's Ex-wife.
- Sergeant Rob Crowley: UK, 47 years old; Can't afford to retire.
- Yang Ziu: China, 38 years old; Medical officer; Supporting her parents after they lost everything in a crypto scam.
- Corporal Melissa Drake: Mexico, 26 years old; Working to raise money for her niece's full liver reconstruction surgery.
- Private Billy "Hux" Huxton: USA, 21 years old; Forced to join the military to make a living.
- Corporal Peter Powell: Australia, 38 years old; In debt, being sued over his social media activity.
- Private Koji "Endeavour" Endo: Japan, 19 years old; Currently living in a synthetic body on hire from Durante.
- Corporal Alexander Kraus: Germany, 42 years old; Tactical specialist, gambling addicted.
- Lieutenant M.L. Starck: 232 years old; member of the "Lewis and Clark" crew from the original 1997 film, originally portrayed by Joely Richardson.

=== Plot ===
==== Issue 1 ====
Two hundred years after the second disappearance of the Event Horizon, teenagers Daniel and Benedict Durante, members of the wealthy and powerful Durante family, dismiss their dying mother as pathetic for begging for help. The pair attempt to bargain with Paimon through ritual sacrifice, preparing to kill Skylar, their butler's nine-year-old daughter, in exchange for immortality. Skylar's father interrupts the ritual and rescues his daughter. Daniel remarks that he does not know whether it worked, but an unseen entity with black wings places its hands on Daniel and Skylar.

Nearly four decades later, Daniel is the owner and CEO of Earth's largest space-travel corporation, wielding immense wealth and power. Accompanied on a space expedition aboard the Virgil by his second wife, the artificially intelligent synthetic Annabelle, he recounts the story of the Event Horizon and the crew of the Lewis and Clark, who were sent to investigate when the ship suddenly reappeared seven years after its original disappearance. Over the centuries, the incident has faded into legend. Daniel ostensibly seeks the Gravity Drive, which humanity has been unable to replicate since Weir's disappearance.

Having located the ship's bridge section floating in space, Daniel sends a team of space marines aboard to investigate: Corporal Alexander Kraus, Sergeant Rob Crowley, Medical Officer Yang Ziu, Corporal Melissa Drake, Private Billy "Hux" Huxton, Corporal Peter Powell, and Private Koji "Endeavour" Endo.

While monitoring the mission from the Virgil, Kraus reports that sensors are detecting faint life signs aboard the Event Horizon. The marines discover the deformed but preserved body of Lewis and Clark crew member Ensign F. M. Justin. As they question the need for weapons on what appears to be a treasure hunt, Annabelle releases their accompanying payload, which contains Daniel's first wife, Skylar. Once Skylar is released, life readings throughout the Event Horizon suddenly increase. Daniel explains that the ship has remained dormant for years because it was missing something.

Aboard the Event Horizon, Justin awakens and attempts to attack the team but remains trapped inside his stasis chamber. Kraus tells Daniel that he is withdrawing the team because of the danger, but Daniel, guided by the same winged entity from his childhood, orders Annabelle to kill Kraus. The Event Horizon begins moving on its own towards Neptune. The marines are then confronted by Lieutenant Starck of the Lewis and Clark, who warns them that the ship is taking them to Hell.

==== Issue 2 ====
In the past, Skylar is raised to serve as a member of staff for the Durante family. As a young adult, she leaves their service, although her father warns her that automation has left little work available elsewhere. By the age of 26, Skylar has made her own way, but her life is mired in hardship and poverty. Following Benedict's suicide, Daniel seeks her out under the guidance of the winged entity. Believing he has changed since childhood, Skylar marries him to escape her circumstances.

Skylar eventually discovers Daniel's secret room, which contains a board bearing the words "Trauma is Key". Afterwards, Daniel begins a campaign to make her life unbearable. He repeatedly has her confined or imprisoned against her will, but she always manages to escape. At the age of 46, she is chemically incapacitated to ensure she can no longer flee.

Before the launch of the Virgil mission, Daniel visits the Bedlam Mental Health and Well-Being Centre to collect Skylar, who remains sedated and in stasis. A doctor challenges Daniel, arguing that Skylar's condition has been exaggerated and that she should not be confined there. Daniel, who owns the centre, threatens him with Annabelle if he continues to object.

In the present, Starck confirms that she is the last survivor of the Lewis and Clark and that the Event Horizon is travelling to Neptune, where a gateway to Hell is located. She says that the body in the stasis chamber is no longer Justin and attempts to kill it, but the marines restrain her. Starck warns them that the Event Horizon is powered by misery and trauma, identifying Skylar as its current source of power. Justin breaks free and, speaking on behalf of the ship, declares that Skylar is delicious and that it intends to take them all back to a wonderful place. He transforms into a monster as other demonic entities attack the team. Starck prepares to kill Skylar to deprive the ship of its power, but ultimately relents, and they flee together.

==== Issue 3 ====
Starck is revealed to have been trapped aboard the ship for more than 200 years, repeatedly fighting and dying at the hands of its demonic creatures before being resurrected because the ship needs her to sustain itself. She has endured the cycle for so long that fighting for survival has become monotonous.

The ship initially attempted to exploit Starck's trauma, but when it found none, it created trauma by subjecting her to relentless suffering. It forced her to relive the arrival of her crew and their time aboard the ship, while also tormenting her with visions of the demonic Weir. Her colleague Cooper took longer to realise that they were trapped in a loop, but eventually abandoned the ship and drifted into space, where he died. Afterwards, the Event Horizon made escape more difficult to prevent Starck from also leaving permanently. Over time, as the ship weakened, both it and Starck fell into a dormant state until the arrival of the marines and Skylar.

In the present, most of the marines are killed by the demonic horde, while Starck, Skylar, and Crowley make their way towards the surviving marines on the bridge. Aboard the Virgil, Daniel remarks that he can sense his brother drawing closer and orders Annabelle to dock with the Event Horizon so that they can board it. In the Chaos Realm, aboard the engine section of the Event Horizon, Weir emerges from the Gravity Drive with the body of a gigantic spider attached beneath his abdomen. He exclaims that his child will soon be whole again.

==== Issue 4 ====
Huxton and Endo confront Daniel on the bridge of the Event Horizon, but Daniel overrides control of Endo's synthetic body, forcing him to kill Huxton. At Daniel's request, Annabelle interfaces with the 'mind' of Event Horizon to communicate with the separated Gravity Drive section, but finds herself outmatched by the ship's will. The ship explains that it was once a mother to its crew, until Paimon gave it life and agency, and it decided to be a mother no more. Declaring itself a hungry god that must be worshipped and fed, the ship appears before Annabelle as a gigantic female humanoid composed of flesh and ship parts. It reveals that Annabelle is not the first synthetic created by Daniel, who used and abused her predecessors, and tells her that she is equally expendable, leading Annabelle to question whether her agency is truly her own. Daniel orders Annabelle to activate the gravity drive, while an excited Weir waits on the other side.

Looking through a window, Starck sees a gateway open in space for the first time in two hundred years and insists on heading to the bridge. There, Daniel orders Annabelle to execute Endo, but, remembering the Event Horizon's words, she refuses. Annabelle tells Daniel that she is leaving him. In the Chaos Realm, fleshy tentacles emerge from the gateway and envelop the Event Horizon's gravity drive section.

==== Issue 5 ====
It is revealed that Daniel killed his brother at his request, sending him to Hell as part of their plan to achieve immortality.

In the present, Daniel shoots Endo and Annabelle for refusing his orders. He demands that the angelic entity take him to Hell, but is told he must first take innocent lives.

Starck, Skylar, and Crowley struggle through the ship's shifting interiors. Skylar is overcome by fear and falls into a fleshy pit, separating her from the others. Starck escorts Crowley to the connecting tunnel to the Virgil but refuses to leave without Skylar. Meanwhile, Skylar finds the damaged Annabelle before Daniel confronts them. Before he can kill them, fleshy tentacles seize him, allowing Skylar to kill him. Annabelle suggests the ship protected Skylar for its own purposes. The winged entity reveals itself to Skylar and tells her to be good and quick. They are then forced to flee a horde of malformed creatures.

As the two halves of the Event Horizon are reconnected, the spider-like Weir captures Starck, who kills herself to escape, knowing she will resurrect elsewhere. At the Virgil tunnel, Annabelle offers to remain behind and force the Event Horizon back to Hell. Starck agrees to stay with her, while Crowley and Skylar escape aboard the Virgil. The Event Horizon forms a gigantic mouth at its bow and attempts to devour them. Annabelle interfaces with the ship again and restrains it with tentacles that drag it back through the portal to Hell before she and Starck are overwhelmed. Starck calls out to her former captain, Miller, saying she will see him soon.

In Hell, Daniel is held captive by Weir, who tells him that his brother is screaming elsewhere before beginning to maim him. In space, Skylar tells Crowley that they must now make sure they live.

== Issues ==
Issue #	Title	Written by	Drawn by	Colored by	Lettered by	Publication date
1	Event Horizon: Inferno #1	Christian Ward	Robert Carey	Xenon Honchar	Alex Ray	April 2026
2	Event Horizon: Inferno #2	Christian Ward	Robert Carey	Xenon Honchar	Alex Ray	2026
3	Event Horizon: Inferno #3	Christian Ward	Robert Carey	Xenon Honchar	Alex Ray	July 2026
4	Event Horizon: Inferno #4	Christian Ward	Robert Carey	Xenon Honchar	Alex Ray	August 2026
