= Sweet Girl (film) =

2021 American film

- Official release poster
- Directed by: Brian Andrew Mendoza
- Written by: Philip Eisner; Gregg Hurwitz
- Produced by: Jason Momoa; Brian Andrew Mendoza; Brad Peyton; Jeff Fierson
- Starring: Jason Momoa; Isabela Merced; Manuel Garcia-Rulfo; Adria Arjona; Raza Jaffrey; Justin Bartha; Lex Scott Davis; Michael Raymond-James; Amy Brenneman
- Cinematography: Barry Ackroyd
- Edited by: Mike McCusker; Matt Chessé
- Music by: Steven Price
- Production companies: ASAP Entertainment; On The Roam
- Distributed by: Netflix
- Release date: August 20, 2021 (United States)
- Running time: 110 minutes
- Country: United States
- Language: English

Sweet Girl is a 2021 American action thriller film directed by Brian Andrew Mendoza in his feature directorial debut and written by Philip Eisner and Gregg Hurwitz. The film stars Jason Momoa, Isabela Merced, Manuel Garcia-Rulfo, Adria Arjona, Raza Jaffrey, Justin Bartha, Lex Scott Davis, Michael Raymond-James, and Amy Brenneman.

It is about the quest for vengeance by a father and daughter who are devastated by their loss of a loved one from cancer after a corrupt pharmaceutical company pulls a life-saving drug off the market. Sweet Girl was released on Netflix on August 20, 2021, and received negative reviews from critics for its clichéd story and wasted potential, but its stunts were praised. Metacritic assessed it as having mixed reviews.

Netflix announced in October 2021 that 68 million accounts had watched at least 2 minutes of the film within 28 days of release.

== Plot ==
The Cooper family live in Pittsburgh and are happy together, with the father, survival expert Ray, and his teenage daughter Rachel sharing an interest in practicing mixed martial arts and self-defense at the gym Ray runs. However, things go downhill when Amanda, Ray's wife, falls ill with cancer.

Ray is told that a new life-saving drug developed by BioPrime could save her. However, he subsequently learns it was pulled off the market due to the company's CEO Simon Keeley paying the manufacturer to delay production. Ray sees him on a live TV interview show, so calls in and threatens to kill him if his wife dies. After Amanda dies, he and Rachel are devastated.

Six months later, Ray receives a call from investigative journalist Martin Bennett, who tells him that he has evidence of criminal activity and corruption committed by BioPrime. They meet on a subway, unaware they were followed by Rachel and a hitman named Santos. Bennett explains that the company has been bribing anyone who questions their dirty deeds, but before he can share more, Santos stabs him dead, then stabs Ray and knocks out Rachel, leaving them both on the platform.

Two years later, Ray has been obsessively tracking Keeley's movements and BioPrime's activities. He infiltrates their charity auction, where Keeley is the keynote speaker, and threatens him. He tells him that BioPrime's chairman, Vinod Shah, is behind all the corruption. In the brutal fight that follows, Ray kills a bodyguard and strangles Keeley to death. He then flees with Rachel and they hide in a motel outside of town.

Rachel, concerned that her father has gone too far, contacts FBI Agent Sarah Meeker and tries to convince her to look into BioPrime's misdeeds. Two mercenaries slip into the motel to attack them, but Ray sets a trap and kills them both. He then sets up an ambush in a bridge to attack Shah's heavily guarded convoy but Santos appears and shoots Shah dead, causing Ray and Rachel to flee.

The pair tracks Santos to a diner, where they have a parley. He had experienced persecution from an oppressive government in his homeland as a child, so admits that he is sympathetic to Ray's cause. Santos agrees to a temporary truce and reveals that Congresswoman Diana Morgan is his employer, giving Ray a lead on her location, but warns that the next time they meet, he will kill them.

Returning to the city, Ray is pursued by the FBI and flees to the roof of PNC Park. As Meeker tries to talk him down, it is revealed that "Ray" is actually Rachel. Ray had died from his wounds at the subway two years ago. Rachel, suffering from PTSD and dissociative identity disorder, has devoted herself to avenging her parents' death, as she is broken after losing them both, several months apart.

Rachel jumps into the Allegheny River but is retrieved by the FBI, restrained, and put in an ambulance. After breaking free, she locates Morgan's campaign office, where Santos attacks her. After another brutal fight, she stabs him to death.

Rachel confronts Morgan and coerces a confession out of the Congresswoman, admitting she was bribed by BioPrime for government contracts and had ordered the hits on Bennett and Ray. She then flees and sends the recording to the FBI.

In the aftermath, Morgan is arrested for her crimes, while Rachel obtains a fake passport, exchanges her money for cryptocurrency, and boards a plane to a brighter future.

== Cast ==
- Jason Momoa as Ray Cooper
- Isabela Merced as Rachel Cooper
  - Milena Rivero as young Rachel Cooper
- Manuel Garcia-Rulfo as Amos Santos
- Amy Brenneman as Diana Morgan
- Adria Arjona as Amanda Cooper
- Justin Bartha as Simon Keeley
- Raza Jaffrey as Vinod Shah
- Lex Scott Davis as FBI Agent Sarah Meeker
- Michael Raymond-James as FBI Agent John Rothman
- Dominic Fumusa as Sam Walker
- Nelson Franklin as Martin Bennett
- Will Blagrove as Detective Alvarez
- Katy O'Brian as TV Host
- Brian Howe as Pete Micelli
- Reggie Lee as Dr. Wu

== Production ==
In July 2019, it was announced Jason Momoa had joined the cast of the film, with Brian Andrew Mendoza directing from a screenplay by Philip Eisner, Gregg Hurwitz and Will Staples, Momoa will also serve as a producer on the film, with Netflix distributing. In October 2019, Isabela Merced joined the cast of the film. In December 2019, Manuel Garcia-Rulfo, Raza Jaffrey, Adria Arjona, Justin Bartha, Lex Scott Davis, Michael Raymond-James, Dominic Fumusa, Brian Howe, Nelson Franklin, and Reggie Lee joined the cast of the film.

Principal photography commenced on November 11, 2019, in Pittsburgh, Pennsylvania and wrapped on February 11, 2020.

== Release ==
It was released on August 20, 2021, on Netflix.

== Reception ==
On review aggregator website Rotten Tomatoes, the film holds an approval rating of 24% based on 59 reviews, with an average rating of 4.3/10. The website's critical consensus reads: "Burdened with action clichés and tripped up by a late plot twist, Sweet Girl wastes a potentially resonant story and some solid work from its well-matched leads." On Metacritic, the film has a weighted average score of 46 out of 100, based on 16 critics, indicating "mixed or average reviews".

Frank Scheck, the film critic for Hollywood Reporter, praises the way the director "handles the nonstop action efficiently and makes excellent use of the extensive Pittsburgh locations", but he criticizes the way the movie "degenerates into a mindless series of ultraviolent hand-to-hand combat sequences" which strain credibility.

Craig D. Lindsey, film reviewer for AV Club, calls the movie a "big, clunky throwback to '90s cinema" about an "adult-and-child-on-the-lam." Lindsey says that the movie is a "predictable and preposterous" star vehicle for Momoa.

Paul Byrnes, the film critic for the Sydney Morning Herald, criticized the film's script, plot holes, and its "pernicious" conspiracy theory message about seeking revenge against the powerful forces in society are all colluding together.

Matt Zoller Seitz, a film reviewer for RogerEbert.com, calls it a "sprawling, bruising, sometimes convoluted, often emotionally exhausting drama with action sequences stitched into it". Seitz states that the movie is "...too long and disorganized, and often just too much, for its own good", as it attempts to blend five or six 1990s and 2000s blockbuster plots in one film.

David Lewis, the film critic for the San Francisco Chronicle, calls the film "preposterous" and "farfetched" and states that it "strains credibility at almost every turn." Lewis states that the characters are "scantly developed" and he notes that the "story could have used a tad more subtlety."

The Guardian's Benjamin Lee states that it is "admirable" that a mass market film like this criticizes the "amoral practices of big pharma" and the challenges that poor Americans have accessing health care. While Lee praises this "surprisingly substantive starting point", he states that the "thinly etched topicality" of the script "only gets the film so far." Lee states that the twist in the film is "utterly nonsensical" and causes the film to become a "bizarro fantasy" and an "ungainly mess".
