= Marguerite Moreau =

American actress (born 1977)

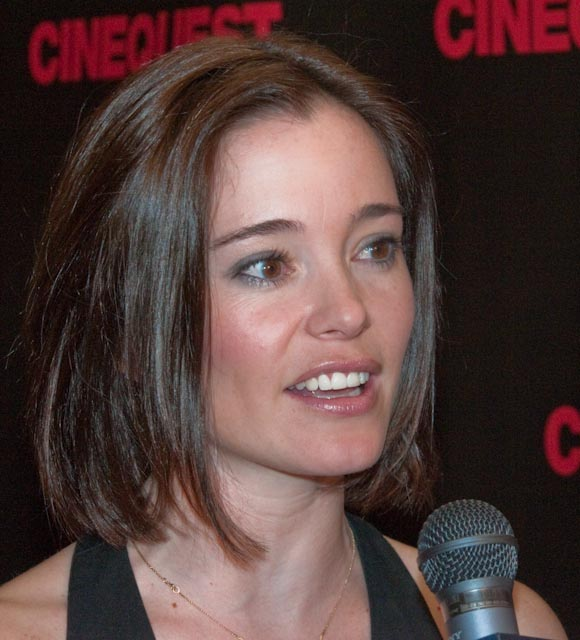
- Moreau in 2009
- Born: April 25, 1977 (age 49); Riverside, California, U.S.
- Education: Vassar College (AB)
- Occupation: Actress
- Years active: 1991–present
- Spouse: Christopher Redman (m. 2010)
- Children: 1

Marguerite Moreau (born April 25, 1977) is an American actress. She is known for her role as Jesse Reeves in the fantasy horror film Queen of the Damned, Katie in the comedy Wet Hot American Summer, and her role as Connie in The Mighty Ducks series of films. She has also made appearances on the television series Smallville, Ghost Whisperer, Lost, Cupid, and The O.C.

== Early life and education ==
Moreau was born on April 25, 1977, in Riverside, California. As a child actress, she appeared in the Mighty Ducks films playing Connie Moreau. Her first break-out role was playing the recurring part of Melanie on Blossom in 1994 and 1995. She guest starred in several TV series such as Boy Meets World and 3rd Rock from the Sun. After graduating from Vassar College with her A.B. in political science in 1999, she landed some of her most prominent roles.

== Career ==
In 2001, she starred as Katie in Wet Hot American Summer. She reprised the role in the prequel Wet Hot American Summer: First Day of Camp (2015) and the sequel Wet Hot American Summer: Ten Years Later (2017), both eight-part series produced by Netflix.

Moreau played the role of Jesse in the 2002 film Queen of the Damned, based on the Anne Rice novels. She played the lead role in the TV miniseries Firestarter: Rekindled, succeeding Drew Barrymore in the role of Charlie McGee. In 2003's Runaway Jury she played opposite Gene Hackman. Moreau also starred in the 2003 independent film Easy, which has also been broadcast on the Showtime cable television network.

Most recently, in 2024, she appeared on a SpectrumTV commercial, alongside actress Lauren Lindsey Donzis.

== Personal life ==
Moreau married actor Christopher Redman in May 2010. In July 2015, she gave birth to a son.

== Filmography ==
=== Film ===
Year	Title	Role	Notes
1992	The Mighty Ducks	Connie Moreau	
1994	D2: The Mighty Ducks	Connie Moreau	
1995	Free Willy 2: The Adventure Home	Julie	
1996	D3: The Mighty Ducks	Connie Moreau	
1997	Wag the Dog	Teenage Girl In Audience	
1998	Mighty Joe Young	Cabriolet Girl	
2001	Wet Hot American Summer	Katie Finnerty	
2001	Rave Macbeth	Helena	
2002	Queen of the Damned	Jesse Reeves	
2003	Two Days	Jennifer	
2003	Easy	Jamie Harris	
2003	Runaway Jury	Amanda Monroe	
2004	Off the Lip	Kat Shutte	
2008	The Uninvited	Lee	
2008	Beverly Hills Chihuahua	Blair	
2009	Ingenious	Cinda	originally titled Lightbulb
2009	Wake	Lila	
2009	Easier with Practice	Samantha	
2009	Bullfighter	Cheyenne Kincade	Short film
2010	Douchebag	Steph	
2010	Hip	Hipster Girl	Short film
2011	Life Happens	Pauline	
2012	Caroline and Jackie	Caroline	
2015	Moments of Clarity	Maryanna	
2016	Inconceivable	Jess	also known as Deadly Ex
2018	You Can't Say No	Alex Murphy	
2019	Paddleton	Kiersten	
2019	Into the Ashes	Tara Brenner	
2020	Monuments	Laura Daniels	
2022	Without Ward	Solsbury H. Gault	
2022	Low Life	Wiles	
2026	Gail Daughtry and the Celebrity Sex Pass	Herself	Cameo

=== Television ===
Year	Title	Role	Notes
1991	The Wonder Years	Julie	Episode: "The Candidate"
1991	Brooklyn Bridge	Mary Margaret	2 episodes
1993	Almost Home	Kimberly	Episode: "Dueling Birthdays"
1994	Boy Meets World	Gail/Rebecca	2 episodes
1994–1995	Blossom	Melanie	3 episodes
1994–1998	The Secret World of Alex Mack	Libby	2 episodes
1995	Amazing Grace	Jenny Miller	Main cast, 5 episodes
1996	Second Noah	Megan Robinson	Episode: "Dreamboat"
1998	3rd Rock from the Sun	Tina	Episode: "Auto Eurodicka"
1998	My Husband's Secret Life	Eileen Sullivan	Television film
2000	Wall to Wall Records	Unknown	Television film
2002	Firestarter: Rekindled	Charlene 'Charlie' McGee	Television film
2002	Smallville	Carrie Castle	Episode: "Drone"
2002	The Locket	Faye Murrow	Television film
2004	Helter Skelter	Susan 'Sadie' Atkins	Television film
2004	Sucker Free City	Jessica Epstein	Television film
2004–2005	Life as We Know It	Monica Young	Main cast, 10 episodes
2005	The O.C.	Reed Carlson	4 episodes
2005	Killer Instinct	Detective Ava Lyford	Episode: "Pilot"
2005	Lost	Starla	Episode: "Everybody Hates Hugo"
2006	What About Brian	Suzanne	Recurring role, 6 episodes
2007	Ghost Whisperer	Lisa Bristow	Episode: "Dead to Rights"
2008	The Consultants	June	Television film
2008	Mad Men	Vicky	Episode: "Three Sundays"
2008	Life	Betsy Bournes	Episode: "The Business of Miracles"
2009	Cupid	Madelyn	Episode: "Pilot"
2009	Hawthorne	Faye	Episode: "Night Moves"
2009	Monk	Amanda Castle	Episode: "Mr. Monk and the Dog"
2009	CSI: NY	Louise Dukes	Episode: "Cuckoo's Nest"
2009	Private Practice	Lynn Jarvis	Episode: "Sins of the Father"
2010	Brothers & Sisters	Ginny Lawford, Gallery Owner	2 episodes
2010	Parenthood	Katie	4 episodes
2011	In Plain Sight	Cici	Episode: "I'm a Liver Not a Fighter"
2011–2012	Shameless	Linda	Recurring role, 6 episodes
2012	Playdate	Emily Valentine	Television film
2013–2014	Grey's Anatomy	Dr. Emma Marling	Recurring role, 7 episodes
2015	Wet Hot American Summer: First Day of Camp	Katie Finnerty	Main cast, 8 episodes
2016	The People v. O. J. Simpson: American Crime Story	Laura Hart McKinny	Episode: "Manna from Heaven"
2016	Love Always, Santa	Celia Banks	Television film
2017	Wet Hot American Summer: Ten Years Later	Katie Finnerty	Main cast, 8 episodes
2017	Ex-Wife Killer	Josie	Television film
2018	Overexposed	Sheila Prescott	Television film
2018	A Night to Regret	Beverly Bilson	Television film
2018	Tell Me a Story	Abby Powell	Episode: "Truth"
2019	The Birch	Rachel Bouchard	Recurring role, 6 episodes
2021	The Mighty Ducks: Game Changers	Connie Moreau	Episode: "Spirit of the Ducks"
2025	High Potential	Heather Donovan	Episode: "The Sauna at the End of the Stairs"
2025	The Pitt	Lynette Wheeler	4 episodes
2026	Will Trent	Liv Summermann	Episode: "Nice to Meet You, Malcolm"
