= Steven Edward McDonald =

English science fiction writer

- Born: 1956 (age 69–70); Warsop, United Kingdom
- Occupation: Novelist
- Writing career
- Genre: Science fiction

Steven Edward McDonald (born 1956), or Steven E. McDonald, is an English science fiction writer. To date he has written four books, many short stories, and a great deal of poetry and non-fiction. He has worked as a screenwriter both for television and feature films. He now lives in the US Southwest.

== Bibliography ==
=== Novels ===
- The Janus Syndrome (1981)
- Event Horizon (1997)
- Supernova (1999)
- Waystation (2004) - Gene Roddenberry's Andromeda series

=== Short stories ===
His short story "Silken Dragon" appeared in Dragons of Light edited by Orson Scott Card.
