= Event Horizon (film) =

1997 film by Paul Anderson

- Theatrical release poster
- Directed by: Paul Anderson
- Written by: Philip Eisner
- Produced by: Lawrence Gordon; Lloyd Levin; Jeremy Bolt
- Starring: Laurence Fishburne; Sam Neill; Kathleen Quinlan; Joely Richardson
- Cinematography: Adrian Biddle
- Edited by: Martin Hunter
- Music by: Michael Kamen
- Production companies: Golar Productions; Impact Pictures
- Distributed by: Paramount Pictures (United States); United International Pictures (International)
- Release dates: 12 August 1997 (Beverly Hills); 15 August 1997 (United States); 22 August 1997 (United Kingdom)
- Running time: 96 minutes
- Countries: United States; United Kingdom
- Language: English
- Budget: $50–70 million
- Box office: $47.1 million

Event Horizon is a 1997 science fiction horror film directed by Paul Anderson and written by Philip Eisner. The film stars Laurence Fishburne, Sam Neill, Kathleen Quinlan, and Joely Richardson. Set in 2047, it follows the crew of the rescue vessel Lewis and Clark, led by Captain Miller (Fishburne), who are sent to investigate the Event Horizon, a spaceship that mysteriously vanished seven years prior during its maiden voyage to Proxima Centauri and has reappeared in orbit around Neptune. Accompanied by the ship's designer, Dr. Weir (Neill), they board the derelict ship to search for survivors and determine what happened after its experimental gravity drive, meant for faster-than-light travel by folding space-time, was activated.

Eisner conceived the story in the early 1990s and completed a first draft in 1992. After Mortal Kombat (1995), Anderson sought a darker, more visceral project and took Paramount Pictures' offer of Event Horizon once Soldier (1998) was delayed. Finding the original script too similar to Alien (1979), Anderson worked with Eisner to reorient the story, introducing influences from Solaris (1972) and Hellraiser (1987). Principal photography took place entirely at Pinewood Studios in England from 18 November 1996 to 14 March 1997 as an American–British co-production, with an estimated budget of $50–70 million. Paramount compressed the schedule after Titanic was delayed, leaving little time for post-production and moving the release date earlier. At Paramount's insistence, the original 130-minute cut was reduced to 96 minutes after test audiences reacted poorly to its graphic content.

Event Horizon premiered in Beverly Hills on 12 August 1997, and was released in the United States on 15 August and in the United Kingdom one week later. Paramount distributed the film in the United States and Canada, while United International Pictures distributed it internationally. Critical reception was generally unfavourable, with reviewers frequently calling it superficial and derivative. The film was a box-office bomb, grossing $47.1 million worldwide; early in its theatrical run, Paramount's parent company, Viacom, wrote it off as a major loss. Commentators have attributed its failure in part to its late-summer release against lighter science-fiction hits such as Men in Black and to marketing that targeted hardcore science-fiction fans rather than horror enthusiasts, which may have weakened its broader appeal.

The film later found a cult following on home video. The success of its initial DVD release prompted Paramount to discuss a director's cut with Anderson, but most of the deleted footage had been lost or destroyed. It has since been reappraised, appearing on lists of the best horror films of all time, and influencing many subsequent science fiction and horror films and video games. In 2025, IDW Publishing began publishing the comic-book prequel series Dark Descent; a sequel series, Inferno, followed in 2026.

== Plot ==
In 2047, a distress signal is received from the Event Horizon, a spaceship that disappeared during its maiden voyage to Proxima Centauri seven years earlier. The ship has mysteriously reappeared in Neptune's orbit, prompting US Aerospace Command to dispatch the Lewis and Clark rescue vessel to investigate. Its crew members—Captain Miller, navigator Lieutenant Starck, pilot Smith, medical technician Peters, engineer Justin, doctor D.J., and rescue technician Cooper—are joined by the designer of the Event Horizon, Dr. William Weir. Weir briefs the others on the ship's experimental gravity drive with a simple visual of how it folds spacetime to instantly transport the ship across vast distances. Weir then plays back the distress signal, which consists of screams, howls, and a voice speaking Latin. D.J. recognises the phrase "līberāte mē", which he translates to "save me".

Upon boarding the Event Horizon, the crew finds signs of a massacre. While they search for survivors, the ship's gravity drive activates and pulls Justin into a portal, then emits a shock wave that breaches the hull of the Lewis and Clark. The crew is forced to relocate to the Event Horizon while Cooper rescues Justin from the portal, finding him reduced to a catatonic state. Smith and Cooper are sent on a spacewalk to repair the hull of the Lewis and Clark. The crew experience hallucinations of their largest fears and regrets: Miller sees a subordinate from a previous mission whom he left to die in order to save the other crew; Peters sees her son with his legs covered in bloody lesions; Weir sees a vision of his dead wife, now eyeless, urging him to join her.

Justin wakes from his coma and vents himself from the airlock; he is saved by Miller, who places a severely injured Justin in stasis. Miller confides in D.J. about his hallucinations, prompting D.J. to reveal that he found a longer phrase in the distress signal—"libera te tutemet ex inferis", which he translates to "save yourself from Hell". D.J. concludes that the ship's drive opened a gateway to somewhere beyond the known universe and brought something back with it. A video log is discovered on the Event Horizon, showing the ship's crew members brutalising each other after engaging the gravity drive, with their captain chanting in Latin as he holds his own eyeballs in his hands.

Miller orders his crew to speed up their evacuation, ignoring Weir's protests. Miller and Smith retrieve CO_{2} scrubbers from the Event Horizon as Peters is lured to her death by a hallucination of her son. Weir finds her body and is flung into a hallucination of his wife's suicide, driving him to gouge out his own eyes and embrace the ship's evil presence. Corrupted, he uses an explosive to destroy the Lewis and Clark, killing Smith and blasting Cooper into space before killing D.J. by vivisecting him. Miller and Starck confront Weir on the bridge but are overpowered. Weir initiates a 10-minute countdown to activate the gravity drive and return the ship to the hellish dimension. Cooper uses his spacesuit's oxygen supply to propel himself back to the ship and appears at the bridge window. Weir shoots at him, shattering the window and blowing himself into space.

Miller, Starck and Cooper survive and seal off the ship's bridge. With their own ship destroyed, Miller plans to destroy the central corridor with explosives, splitting the Event Horizon in two and using its forward section as a lifeboat. He is attacked by hallucinations, which turn out to be Weir—resurrected and further mutilated. Miller fights Weir at the gravity drive and detonates the explosives, sacrificing himself to save his remaining crew. The gravity drive activates, pulling the ship's stern through a black hole back to the hellish dimension. Starck and Cooper enter stasis beside a comatose Justin and wait to be rescued.

Seventy-two days later, a rescue party boards the Event Horizon wreckage and discovers the survivors in stasis. Starck hallucinates Weir as one of the rescuers and screams, waking her from her nightmare. Cooper and the rescue team attempt to calm the terrified Starck as the doors close.

== Cast ==
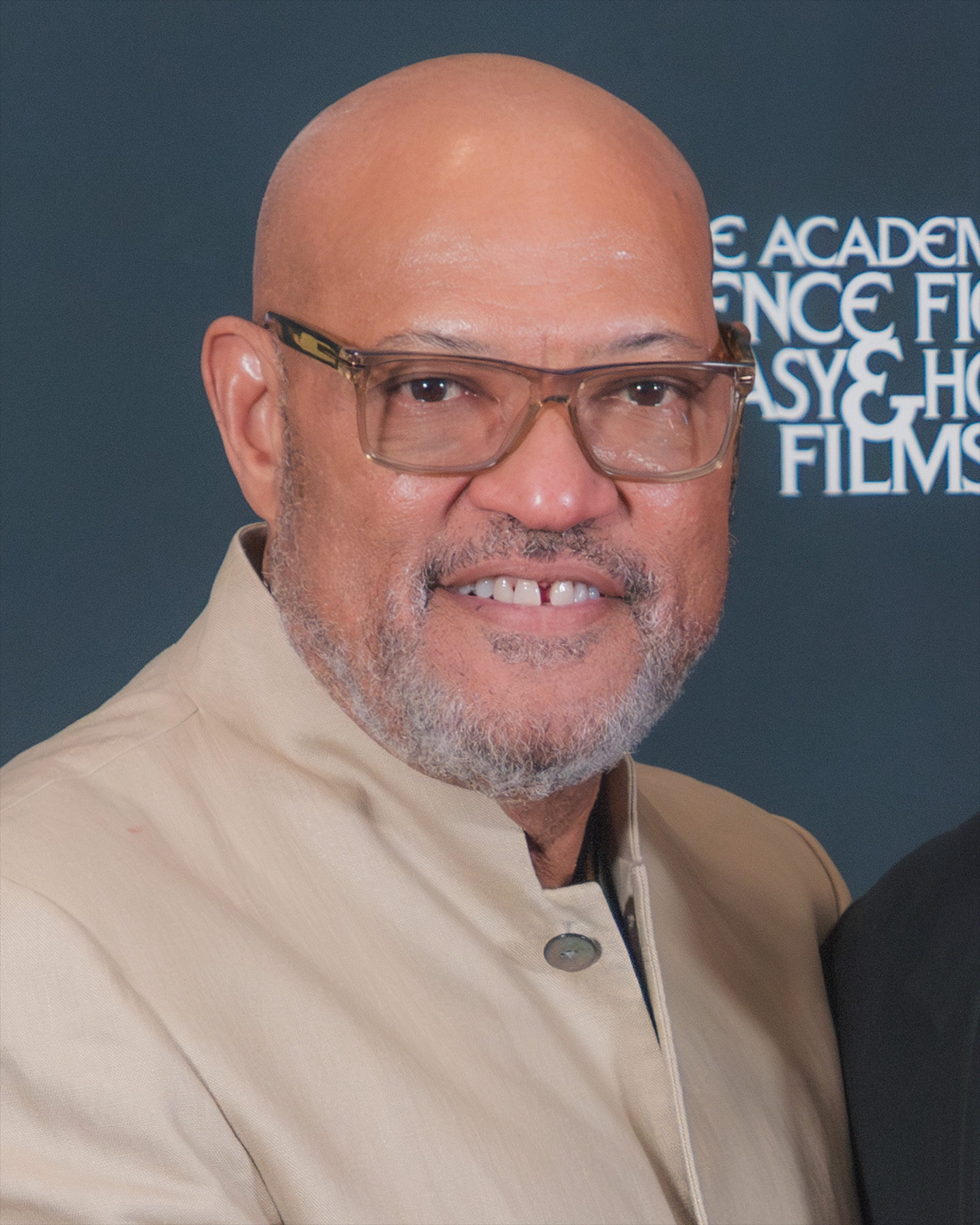
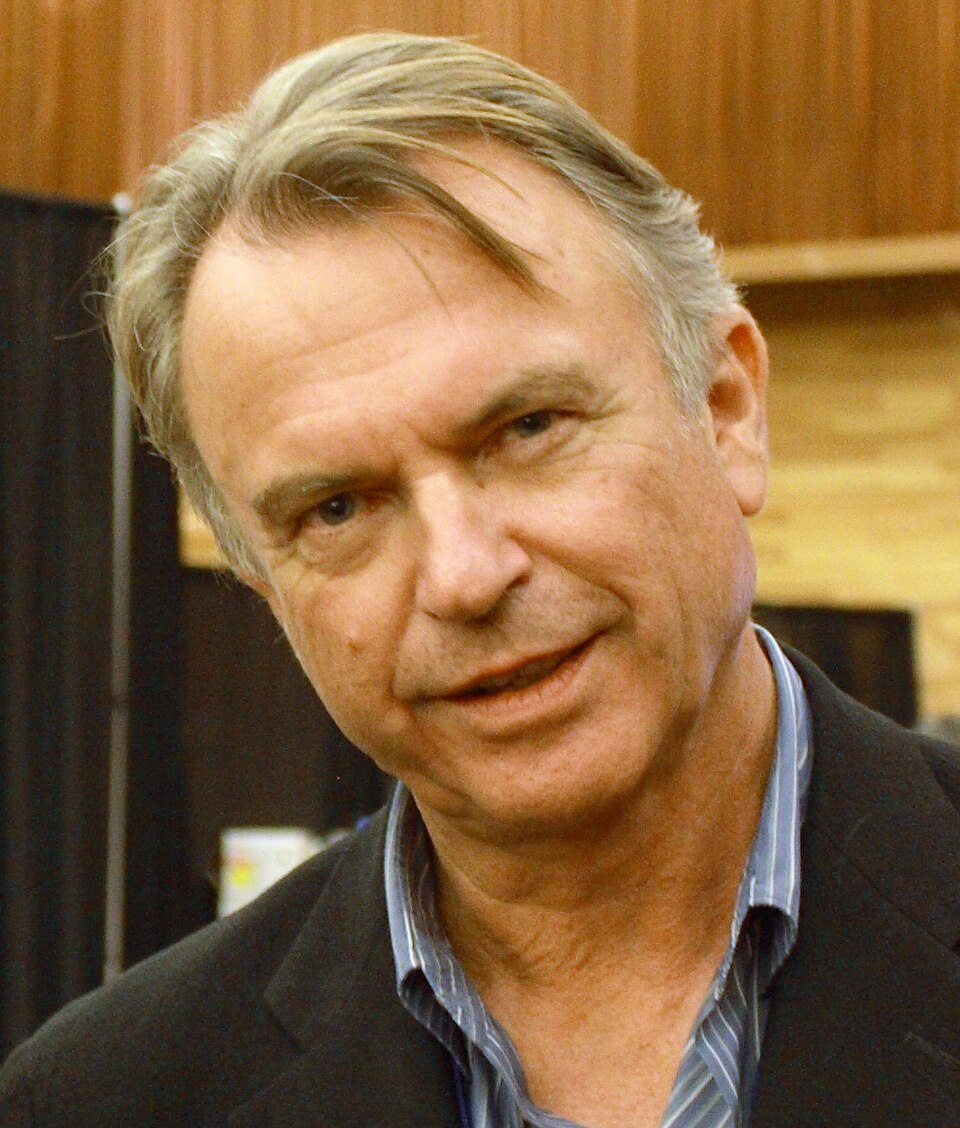
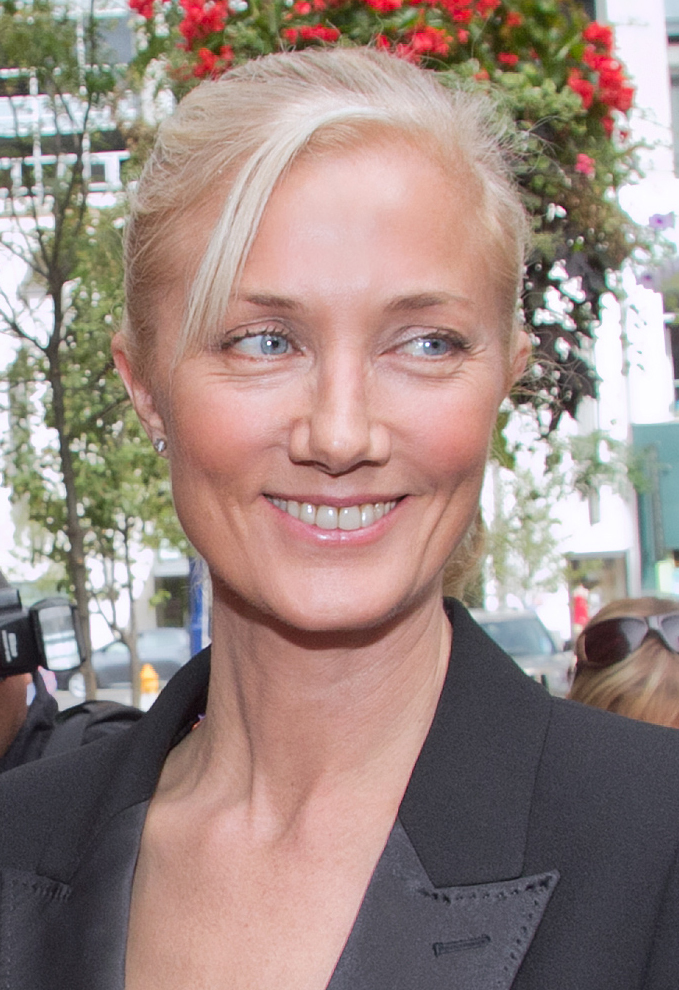
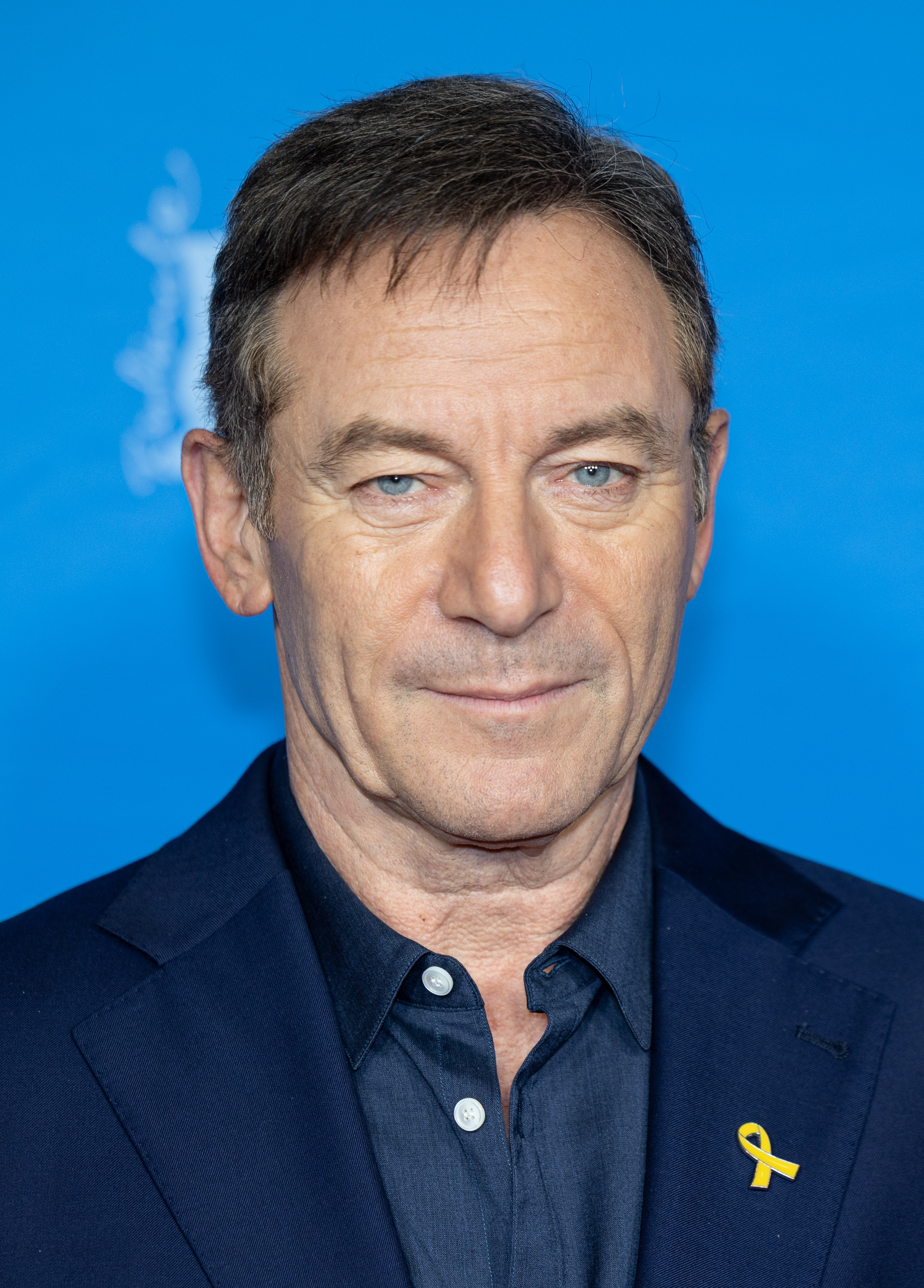
(Left to right) Laurence Fishburne (pictured in 2026), Sam Neill (2010), Joely Richardson (2011), and Jason Isaacs (2025)
- Laurence Fishburne as Captain S. J. Miller: The highly experienced commanding officer of the Lewis and Clark and a former crewmember of the Goliath who survived its failed rescue mission
- Sam Neill as Dr. William G. "Billy" Weir: A scientist and the disgraced designer of the Event Horizon who was exiled to an Earth-orbiting station after the ship vanished
- Kathleen Quinlan as Peters: The motherly emergency medical technician on the Lewis and Clark
- Joely Richardson as Lieutenant M. L. Starck: The sharp-minded and sharp-tongued navigator on the Lewis and Clark
- Richard T. Jones as T. F. Cooper: The cocky rescue technician on the Lewis and Clark
- Jack Noseworthy as F. M. Justin: The hot-shot chief engineer on the Lewis and Clark
- Jason Isaacs as D.J.: The stoic trauma surgeon on the Lewis and Clark
- Sean Pertwee as W. F. "Smitty" Smith: The high-strung pilot of the Lewis and Clark

Appearing in hallucinations are Holley Chant as Claire Weir, Dr. Weir's deceased wife; Barclay Wright as Denny Peters, Peters' son; and Noah Huntley as Edmund "Eddie" Corrick, Miller's former Goliath shipmate, whom he continues to regret having left behind to burn to death. Robert Jezek appears as a rescue technician who rescues the survivors of the Lewis and Clark crew. In the recovered Event Horizon ship's log video, Peter Marinker portrays Captain John Kilpack, the ship's commanding officer.

Other members of the original crew were played by British film directors Bharat Nalluri and Gary Sinyor, actress Emily Booth, several pornographic actors in the orgiastic massacre footage, as well as the film's screenwriter Philip Eisner as a man consuming another's entrails. Director Paul Anderson makes a cameo on the cover of a fictional autobiography seen floating aboard the Event Horizon during Weir's opening dream sequence.

== Production ==
=== Conception and writing ===
Event Horizon was conceived in the early 1990s by aspiring screenwriter Philip Eisner. After rewatching Stanley Kubrick's The Shining (1980), he was inspired to transpose its haunted-house premise into a science-fiction setting. Eisner drew on his interest in physics, reasoning that exposure to warped spacetime at scales beyond normal human perception would psychologically shatter people. He has also cited the influence of H. P. Lovecraft, Robert Wise's The Haunting (1963), Kubrick's 2001: A Space Odyssey (1968), Ridley Scott's Alien (1979), the tabletop game Warhammer 40,000 (starting 1987), and Stephen Hawking's book A Brief History of Time (1988).

Eisner first pitched the concept verbally to his contract employers, producers Lawrence Gordon and Lloyd Levin, describing it as "a haunted house story in space". Gordon responded favourably and encouraged him to develop a full screenplay. Eisner began writing in spring 1992, spent eight months on the first draft and delivered the initial version of the script by October. Gordon and Levin commissioned the project, and advanced it in partnership with Paramount Pictures.

The opening thirty pages remained largely intact during production, except for a sequence involving the mining vessel the Lucky Strike, which was removed due to budget constraints. That sequence would have established the Lewis and Clark crew working as a team in action; some of its elements were instead moved later in the film to when the crew is on Event Horizon. Progress on the remainder of the script was slower because Eisner faced personal difficulties after his father died in a skiing accident. A creative executive was brought in to support him and keep his momentum going. Since the project began as a pitch, Gordon retained ownership of the material; when he left Largo Entertainment, he took the Event Horizon script with him. Gordon's new company, Golar, subsequently produced the film; its name is a respelling of Largo.

In Eisner's original screenplay for Event Horizon, there was no reference to heaven or hell. Instead, the crew of the Event Horizon was driven mad by experiencing warped space-time. Moreover, Eisner described the location they reached as a Lovecraftian alien environment featuring giant mollusk-like creatures in a sea of oil beneath a dead star; one of these alien minds had infected the ship. This premise prompted the studio to suggest alternatives, such as portraying the ship itself as sentient or attributing the phenomena to a flaw in the ship's computer code that caused it to appear to have a mind of its own.

=== Development and reworking ===
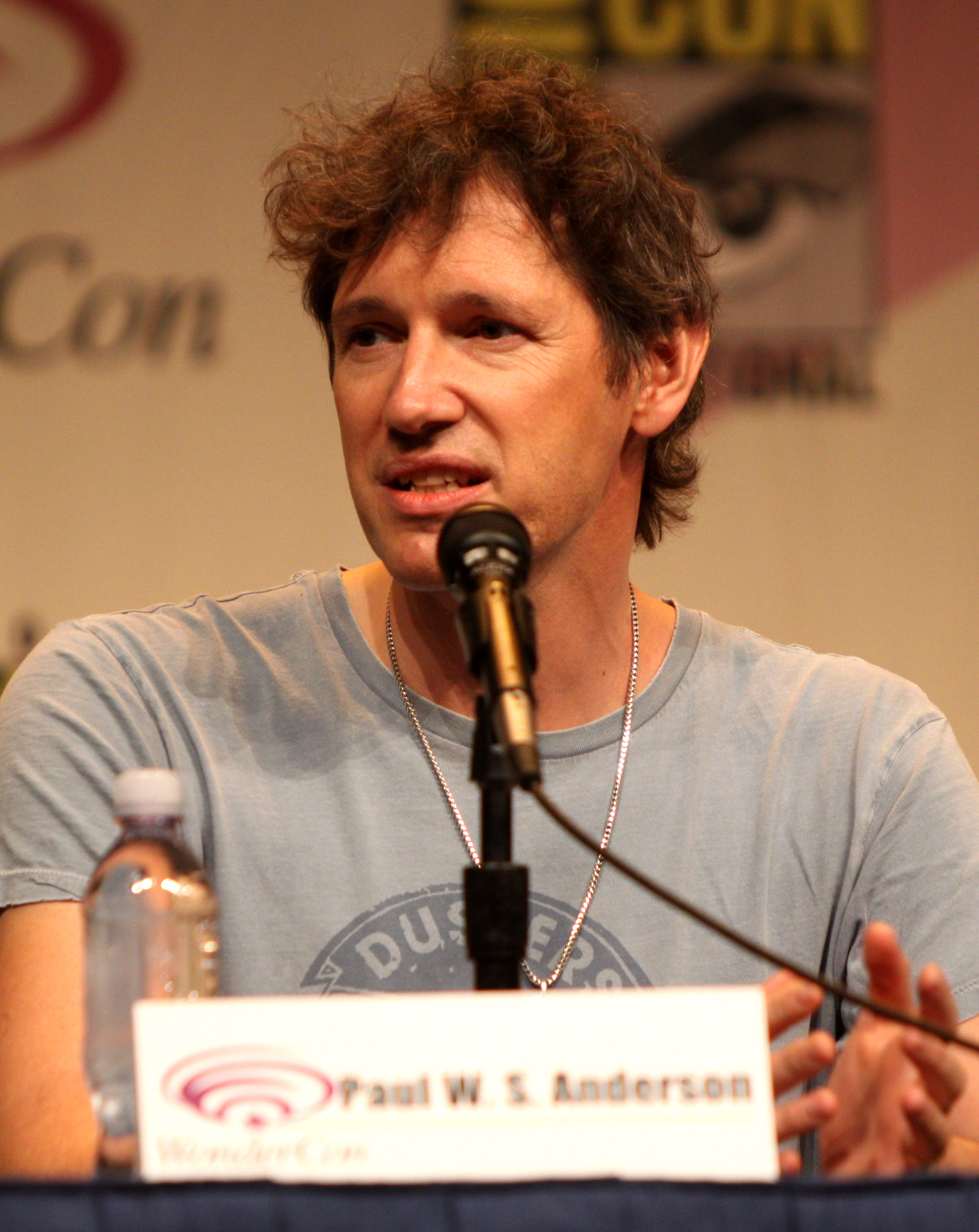
Director Paul Anderson in 2012. He reworked Event Horizon from an Alien-style extraterrestrial spaceship story into one about a Hell-possessed ship.

After Mortal Kombat (1995) became a commercial success in the United States, English director Paul Anderson (Note: Anderson was credited as simply "Paul Anderson" on all of his films during the 1990s, including Event Horizon. After his following film, Soldier (1998), he adopted "Paul W. S. Anderson", featuring his middle initials, to distinguish himself from Paul Thomas Anderson, as both were registered as "Paul Anderson" in different guilds.) was inundated with screenplay offers and opportunities to direct the Mortal Kombat sequel Mortal Kombat Annihilation (1997) and the forthcoming X-Men (2000). He was interested in X-Men but withdrew because of its extremely tight production schedule or turned it down because he did not want to make another PG-13 movie as he had done previously with Mortal Kombat. Instead, he sought a darker, more visceral project. He became particularly interested in two science-fiction scripts, Soldier (1998) for Warner Bros. and Event Horizon for Paramount, and struggled to choose between them. Anderson initially signed on to direct Soldier, but the project was postponed after its star, Kurt Russell, decided he required a full year of physical training to prepare for the role. Rather than wait, Anderson pivoted back to Event Horizon, which still lacked a director.

Anderson's initial reaction to the script was that it bore a striking resemblance to Alien. The script involved the Event Horizon experiencing a series of hauntings by "tentacular" aliens after crossing the threshold of their planet or dimension. Producer and Anderson's longtime collaborator Jeremy Bolt called it a "terrific concept" but "very dense" in length, and the storyline got "a bit lost". Seeking to avoid direct imitation, Anderson revised the material and reoriented it toward the traditions of classic haunted-house cinema, particularly The Haunting and The Shining for their emphasis on unseen evil and ambiguous endings. He also introduced the notion that the vessel itself had become possessed by a hellish entity rather than an alien consciousness. Andrew Kevin Walker, the screenwriter of Seven (1995), was brought in as a script doctor to perform a major rewrite of the screenplay, developing its hell and damnation concept. Among his other contributions was the Lewis and Clark crew discovering a floating tooth upon boarding the Event Horizon, which was filmed but later cut. Walker received no on-screen credit for his work.

Anderson has stated that the screenplay was partly inspired by Andrei Tarkovsky's Solaris (1972), a film he admires. However, Eisner denied seeing Solaris or Disney's The Black Hole (1979), a claim Anderson and Bolt disputed. Bolt believed the sequence in which rain falls inside the spaceship was drawn from Solaris; Anderson said he added the coolant effect himself so that it would rain inside the ship when gravity was restored. According to Eisner, Anderson also introduced the influence of Hellraiser (1987).

The original script had the crew carrying conventional guns and portrayed them more like a space coast guard service. Anderson saw no logical reason for them having firearms in space and replaced them with nail guns. According to Eisner, roughly two weeks before principal photography began, Paramount conducted informal surveys at a shopping mall in the San Fernando Valley, asking what a black hole was. Because few respondents could explain it, the studio feared the film would not be frightening and pressed to make the ship's connection to Hell more explicit, treating it as a "hell ship." Eisner opposed the changes.

The film was an American–British co-production. Gordon, Levin and Bolt produced it as a Golar Production in association with Bolt and Anderson's company Impact Pictures, with Nick Gillott serving as executive producer and Paramount Pictures funding and distributing it in the United States. Because Paramount greenlit the film only ten weeks before principal photography, Anderson recalled that the roughly 10 months from greenlight to release was "incredibly fast" for such a complicated film.

=== Pre-production ===
Pre-production began in May 1996. The team decided to shoot in England, where Anderson and Bolt were based and where Pinewood Studios offered the necessary facilities, including the large stages associated with the James Bond films. Early hires included cinematographer Adrian Biddle (as they loved his work on Aliens, Thelma & Louise, and 1492: Conquest of Paradise) and editor Martin Hunter (who had collaborated with Anderson on Mortal Kombat). Biddle was the first to be signed on to work on the film by Anderson; he was hired long before any of the cast. Anderson explained this was because it was "very much a design and look-led movie". The production designer was Joseph Bennett, a relatively young designer whose work on Jude (1996) impressed the team; Anderson valued Bennett's enthusiasm and visual flair, believing it would compensate for limited prior experience on large-scale films.

Visual effects supervisor Richard Yuricich, a veteran of science fiction films whose credits included 2001: A Space Odyssey, Close Encounters of the Third Kind, and Blade Runner, was secured early on the strong recommendation of the Mission: Impossible team. Construction manager Harry Metcalfe oversaw the ambitious set-building program. The overall aesthetic was conceived as dark, Gothic, and nightmarish, blending high technology with medieval and visceral human elements. Anderson insisted on a distinctive design that avoided feeling like a lesser Alien or Blade Runner.

Sets had already been designed but not built when the short timeline began; according to Anderson construction manager Harry Metcalfe was the only one with that occupation in the United Kingdom willing to attempt the highly detailed and complex builds at the required speed, which he also noted "cost a lot". The interior of the Lewis and Clark was built as a single continuous multi-level set (bridge to gravity tanks), allowing actors to move freely between spaces; continuous Steadicam shots were used early on to show this. Portions of the set, including the front half, were mounted on hydraulics so the ship could be physically shaken for turbulence sequences (combined with shaking camera work by Biddle). The retracting exit floor was also hydraulic and built over a water tank for extra depth, so the set extended from the stage rafters down into the tank.

==== Casting ====
The filmmakers sought a strong ensemble of skilled actors capable of handling the script's perceived three-dimensional characters rather than relying on a single major star. Captain Miller was originally envisioned as a white Texan in concept art. After Gordon suggested Laurence Fishburne for the role and the crew strongly agreed, he was cast. Fishburne was hooked by the screenplay's suspense and its focus on character over typical science-fiction spectacle; he was particularly drawn to the dynamic between the experienced astronaut and the ship's designer. He turned down the role of the judge in Francis Ford Coppola's The Rainmaker (1997) to take the part. After Gary Sinise and Jeremy Irons declined offers to play Dr. William Weir, Neill took on the role instead, intrigued by the story's "air of mystery" and the chance to portray a grieving, troubled scientist whose greatest creation reappears after years of loss.

Quinlan, whom the crew sought after admiring her work in Apollo 13 (1995), joined as emergency technician Peters, attracted by the ensemble nature of the piece and the opportunity to play an active, professional single mother rather than reacting primarily to special effects. Richardson was cast as navigator Starck, drawn to familiarity with the other cast members as well as the character's sharp edge. Richard T. Jones played Cooper, connecting with the crew's energetic, protective "joker." Jack Noseworthy took the role of engineer Justin, drawn to the script's psychological-thriller quality and its internal, character-driven horror. Jason Isaacs portrayed the taciturn doctor D.J., interested in the roller-coaster intensity of the story and a role that initially appears potentially suspicious. Isaacs was previously in Anderson's debut feature Shopping (1994). Sean Pertwee was cast as pilot Smith, inspired by the character's superstitious attachment to the ship (echoing the "never get off the boat" philosophy of Apocalypse Now; Pertwee cited Chef, the character who said that in that film, as an inspiration for his performance in Event Horizon).

=== Filming ===
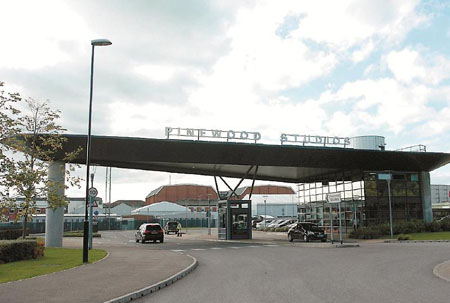
Event Horizon was filmed at Pinewood Studios in England (pictured in 2015).

Principal photography began on 18 November 1996 and wrapped on 14 March 1997, spanning roughly 16 weeks. The film was shot entirely at Pinewood Studios in Iver Heath, England, using seven sound stages, two silent stages, and the studio's garden for the only exterior shot set on Earth. This sequence, the first filmed for the production, showed a video of Peter's son's birthday party. Under Metcalfe's supervision, approximately 20 different sets were constructed, filmed, and struck. The interiors of the Event Horizon filled much of the available space, including the vast 007 Stage. It was Anderson's largest production yet, with reported budget estimates ranging from US$50 million (Note: Attributed to multiple references:) to $70 million. (Note: Anderson and Eisner stated that the budget was $50 million, with the latter also specifing that $50 million was spent on the film itself, with an additional $30 million covering prints and advertising. Variety also mentioned its cost as $50 million in a report on Paramount's 1997 box office outcomes. The BFI documented its budget as £29 million. However, American Cinematographer's August 1997 production article cited $70 million and several later secondary sources have used $60 million.)

Biddle shot Event Horizon in the widescreen anamorphic format using Panavision cameras and lenses, the same format he had used previously on Willow (1988) and 1492: Conquest of Paradise (1992). In an uncommon choice for the period, he chose to shoot the entire film on Eastman Kodak's 500 ASA 5279 Vision stock, an emulsion he had first adopted midway through production of Neil Jordan's The Butcher Boy (1997). Biddle said he favoured the stock for its stronger black levels relative to alternatives such as 5245 and 5296, its greater latitude in low-light conditions, and the scope it gave him to work at a higher f-stop in anamorphic, thereby reducing grain and improving image quality.

Anderson and Biddle used a distinctive colour scheme that relied on gels seldom used by other cinematographers. At their first meeting, Anderson showed Biddle deliberately misbalanced photographs of a rock band under fluorescent light that had shifted to a sickly green. He later described the shade as "mistake-green" and told Biddle it was the look he wanted. Biddle then used gels to recreate the uncorrected fluorescent green of an underground car park, along with sepia tones from the floor and intermittent flashes of red, so the ship's interiors would appear oppressive. Anderson compared the approach with the deep purples and other uncommon gels he and cinematographer John R. Leonetti had used on Mortal Kombat, explaining that the aim was colours that would "unsettle people and make them feel a little ill and queasy.

For zero-gravity sequences, the actors were suspended upside down in harnesses and spun. At the start of filming, the script featured far more such scenes throughout the Event Horizon, but time constraints, the cast's discomfort with wire work, and budget limitations led the introducion of "magnetic boots" instead. Anderson noted that competing with the practical zero-gravity effects of Apollo 13 (1995), which were done in confined spaces, would have been difficult given the film's larger sets, so the production relied on traditional methods. Most of these scenes were shot on VistaVision to provide a larger negative for post-production; Anderson used unusual angles and continuous camera movement and rotation to heighten disorientation.

Effects supervisors Yuricich and Neil Corbould kept most visuals in-camera, and they built moving sets for the gravity drive gyroscope and the revolving tunnel. Because most scenes were filmed in a studio on gothic-inspired sets, Anderson felt the cast experienced a kind of "cabin fever" that better served their performances. Joely Richardson called the experience of working on the film "cursed". The gravity drive set was filmed on the 007 Stage at Pinewood Studios in London during the Christmas period. The cast and crew faced challenging conditions due to the lack of insulation and the stage's thin metal walls, which made the environment extremely cold; rainfall also produced deafening noise from reverberations off the roof. Neill found the later stages of filming particularly demanding, as he was required to work largely unclothed.

The crew filmed all shots of the gravity drive gyroscope in-camera on set. They worried production would be severely disrupted if the prop malfunctioned. Although it never fully broke down, pieces occasionally fell off or rattled inside it, requiring most of the on-location dialogue to be looped or re-recorded in post-production. The shot in which Justin first approaches the gyroscope was achieved by having the actor walk backwards out of frame; the footage was then reversed in post-production so the gyroscope's stop into position, before the gateway to hell opened, appeared smoother.

During principal photography at Pinewood Studios, a fire broke out on Stage 7 while filming a climax sequence in which Fishburne's character is pursued by a fireball unleashed by the burning man. Bolt stated that real flames and a wind machine ignited silk set dressings, engulfing the stage within a minute; he called it the production's only major mishap, with no injuries reported and filming resuming after reconstruction. In the audio commentary, Anderson described a slightly different account: a large flamethrower used for the fireball effect was knocked over by the force of the blast, set the wooden stage alight, and directed flames toward nearby gas tanks, prompting an evacuation. The tanks were unharmed, though the stage itself burned.

The production built a short practical section of the central corridor for the Event Horizon. To create the impression of a much longer passageway without relying on the originally planned extensive visual-effects work, the production placed two large mirrors from France facing each other at opposite ends of the set. The resulting reflections made an inexpensive optical illusion of its continuous length. Camera positions had to be carefully controlled to avoid capturing the mirrors or the camera itself in the reflections. A green room set adjacent to the core was constructed from old green computer circuit boards and shot with wide-angle lenses to enlarge the space.

As Anderson was sometimes too busy filming other scenes, second-unit director Vadim Jean filmed some parts of the "bloody orgy" footage. Real-life amputees were used for special effects scenes where Event Horizon crew members were mutilated, and pornographic film actors were hired to make the sex and rape scenes more realistic and graphic.

=== Design ===
The Event Horizon spaceship was designed by scanning Notre-Dame Cathedral (pictured, 2026) into a computer, then rearranging its Gothic elements into a "techno-medieval" form.

Anderson and concept artist Rick Buden developed the film's visual style through previsualization in Los Angeles before work relocated to London. Bennett and the art department established a "techno-medieval" aesthetic for the Event Horizon: when powered and lit, it resembled a modern vessel in the vein of 2001: A Space Odyssey (1968); when darkened, its forms evoked a dungeon or Gothic cathedral. Inspiration came from particle-accelerator interiors (for their technological yet almost armoured, medieval quality), as well as Tibetan, medieval, and Renaissance design elements. The ship's overall form was cruciform; designers scanned elements of Notre-Dame Cathedral into computers and incorporated towers and other features into the thruster pods and structure, so that from a distance the vessel appeared as a crucifix hanging above Neptune. Areas such as the second and third containments surrounding the gravity drive (literally a contained black hole) received particular attention as the source of the malevolent force.

In early design concepts for the gravity-drive chamber (the "third containment"), the spikes surrounding the core were intended to be mechanical. When the drive activated and came to a stop, the spikes would extend from the walls and lock into the drive itself. Although the production considered realising the effect digitally with computer-generated imagery (CGI), the feature was ultimately abandoned due to budgetary constraints.

By contrast, the Lewis and Clark was designed as a more familiar, functional vessel—described as a submarine crossed with an ambulance—serving as the crew's relatively safe, lived-in environment. It drew deliberate inspiration from the Nostromo in Alien (1979), aiming for a grubby, realistic, familiar Earth-origin look rather than a pristine future; whites on the interior were deliberately dirtied and smudged.

Anderson conceived the film's spinning meat-grinder-like containment, inspired by a Universal Studios Tour ride from his youth (the Six Million Dollar Man attraction, which he believed later became the Earthquake or Dante's Peak ride). The ride spun a tube around passengers to disorient them in a haunted-house style, an effect he recreated on a large scale.

Scenes set aboard the Event Horizon contain religious and Gothic architectural imagery. Anderson has explained that the ship's overall form is deliberately cruciform, resembling a crucifix when viewed from above, and its medical bay also features Gothic-style pillars of distinctly medieval design. The gravity drive gyroscope has been compared to the ophanim; it was inspired by the Lament Configuration from the 1987 film Hellraiser, particularly in the way it realigns and reshapes itself.

Influences on the overall look and framing included paintings by Hieronymus Bosch and Pieter Bruegel, as well as photographs by Joel-Peter Witkin, to give the film a painterly quality. The film also has visual homages to classic haunted-house and horror films including The Haunting (1963), Don't Look Now (1973), The Amityville Horror (1979), and The Shining (1980).

=== Special and visual effects ===
The film contains over 250 effects shots, combining practical and digital work. Visual effects supervisor Richard Yuricich and visual effects producer Stuart McAra oversaw approximately 400 effects workers in England, including CGI specialists at Cinesite and the Computer Film Company. The effects team minimised the use of CGI, preferring practical effects and in-camera techniques whenever feasible, in line with Yuricich's insistence on shooting as much as possible practically. CGI was employed mainly as an enhancement rather than for fully synthetic shots. As Anderson noted, the production avoided visual effects where unnecessary, favoured traditional methods with greater reliance on models over CGI, and, after discussion, opted to build the gravity drive gyroscope as a practical effect rather than create it digitally. Many lighting effects were likewise captured in-camera rather than added digitally.

Model supervisor David Sharpe oversaw an extensive miniatures program: roughly 28 models in total—approximately 14 of the Event Horizon, 12 of the Lewis and Clark, and two of the Daylight Space Station—built in multiple scales to allow both wide establishing shots of the enormous vessels and detailed action close-ups. Many models were constructed as "explodables" for destruction sequences. The main Event Horizon model l measured about 70 feet (21 m), while the miniature used for the destruction of the Lewis and Clark was approximately 25 feet (7.6 m). That sequence combined a practical miniature explosion with CGI (including a spacesuited figure of Cooper) and a stunt performer against a real explosion. Multiple scales of the Lewis and Clark were built to support different shots.

The opening Daylight Station pull-back—showing blinds rising before revealing that Weir is aboard the orbiting station—was a complex composite blending multiple scale-model sizes with a live-action plate. It required dozens of revisions (24 or 25, according to Anderson) at the effects house and was described as extremely difficult. Anderson later recalled that the lead compositor left the industry for a year afterwards because of it.

For the approach sequence, the Event Horizon was deliberately placed in Neptune's upper atmosphere, surrounded by clouds, to create a classic haunted-house or ghost-ship appearance reminiscent of the Mary Celeste or the Flying Dutchman. Anderson preferred this imagery to a simple orbital view despite its scientific implausibility. The clouds were initially omitted during production because the visual-effects supervisor did not relay Anderson's request; they were added as CGI elements only in post-production after Anderson noticed and complained about their absence. At the time, convincing computer-generated clouds were technically challenging, and according to Anderson, the resulting effect created for the film was later reused in other British films for the next five years.

The film's extensive special makeup effects and animatronics were handled through a collaboration between Bob Keen's Image Animation and Pauline Fowler's Animated Extras, two normally rival companies that teamed up because of the scale of the work. Their teams created prosthetics and practical effects for sequences including blood and gore, a frozen corpse shattering, and characters appearing without eyes. In the airlock sequence, the swelling veins on Noseworthy's character were achieved using practical rubber tubes inflated by an air pump. Blood emerging from the eyes was done with tubes concealed inside the actor's fingers; both of these effects were created by Animated Extras. Prosthetics, including Weir's eye sockets, were frequently enhanced with CGI rather than fully replaced. Claire's eyes in the nightmare sequence were originally done with white contact lenses; these were later judged unoriginal and not frightening by Anderson and Bolt and were subsequently replaced or enhanced with CGI hollow sockets.

Other CGI included a digital double of Pertwee's character Smith in a spacesuit walking on the exterior of the Lewis and Clark, which Anderson and Bolt noted as relatively advanced for 1997. Floating debris in the zero-gravity Event Horizon corridors was computer-generated; one object was a bottle of mineral water named after Bernd Eichinger, included as a personal homage since he was a friend of Anderson and Bolt's. A digital double of Weir exiting through a window was later judged by Anderson not to hold up well, though it was considered cutting-edge at the time by the crew for a figure of that size in frame. Moving monitor graphics were mostly achieved via green screen; few practical playback monitors were used on set. The computer animation for the film's title-credits sequence was inspired by the opening titles of the long-running British science-fiction television series Doctor Who.

=== Editing ===
As Anderson explained, directors usually have a standard 10-week editing period to produce a film's first cut, as guaranteed by the Directors Guild of America. However, due to the short production schedule, the rapidly approaching release date, and the fact that principal photography had not finished, Anderson agreed to a six-week editing period, and promised to deliver the film by August 1997, as Paramount wanted a hit film before Titanic's planned September release date. When the main unit wrapped, Anderson was supposed to start editing the film, but he had two weeks of shooting left with the second unit, shortening post-production to just four weeks, during which only a rough cut could be assembled. He noted that at two hours and 10 minutes, it was overly long, with weak direction and acting that could have used another editing pass; unfinished special effects; and a poor sound mix.

Martin Hunter edited nearly the entire film. Terry Rawlings assisted for a few weeks, offering guidance and a few edits, most notably the transition from Neil shaving to the space-station window blinds opening, the film's first jump scare. Anderson regarded this cut as one of his favorites, noting that it heightened audience anticipation and fear thereon. At Anderson's request, Nicholas Wayman-Harris edited the "Visions From Hell" sequence together.

Test screening audiences reacted poorly to the first cut, which had a runtime of 130 minutes. A second assembly, nicknamed "The Old Testament Cut" by the crew for its more explicit references to hell and damnation, received a similar response. Viewers objected to the extreme gore; Anderson and Bolt later claimed that some audience members fainted. Paramount executives, who had stopped reviewing dailies before the graphic sequences were filmed, saw the completed film for the first time with the test audience and were shocked by its intensity. They insisted on a shorter running time and reduced gore, and some felt the film was "besmirching" their Star Trek franchise. Anderson agreed that while his first cut was too long, Paramount forced him to make one that was instead too short, and that the film would benefit by the restoration of around 10 minutes of footage, including some of the deleted gore. Over 30 minutes of footage was cut; the finished film had a runtime of 96 minutes.

The film's ending was a combination of two unused alternate endings. One did not have a jump scare at the end when another rescue crew finds the last two survivors, and Starck hallucinates that she sees Weir, although there was a similar version of the scene included in this ending where she hears screams of the Event Horizon crew and screams before Cooper wakes her. This was the film's original ending in the shooting script. The second ending had Miller fight the burned man from his visions at the core instead of Weir, but this was changed due to the negative test screening.

Deleted or extended material that did not reach the theatrical release included a meeting scene between Weir and people in charge of the mission in which they discuss Event Horizon, some dialogue of which remained present in the theatrical trailer; more backstory for Cooper and Justin, including a stronger explanation for Justin entering the black hole; a deleted backstory of the relationship between Starck and Miller; additional scenes explaining what the gateway to hell/black hole is; Miller finding a tooth floating in Event Horizon; a longer version of the scene where Peters hallucinates that her son's mangled legs are covered in maggots; a scene where Weir hallucinates that Justin turns into his wife Claire; a bloodier version of Weir's wife Claire's suicide; a longer version of the scene where Miller finds D.J.'s vivisected body with his intestines on the table; and a longer version of the "Visions From Hell" scene during Miller's final fight with Weir, with more shots of Event Horizon's crew being tortured.

=== Music ===
Michael Kamen was hired to compose the film's score. Anderson, a fan of hybrid genre music, invited the electronic dance music duo Orbital to collaborate with Kamen and to provide synthesised sounds for the film's unsettling atmosphere. This was also Anderson's first movie to have a classical score. The Prodigy's "Funky Shit" from their 1997 album The Fat of the Land plays over the closing credits; the band visited the set during production and later offered the track shortly before the album topped several charts and brought them fame.

A soundtrack album was released which combined various cues from the score into four tracks of approximately ten minutes.

== Release ==
Event Horizon was originally slated for a fall 1997 release. After Titanic missed its planned summer opening and was postponed to winter, Paramount moved Event Horizon earlier to fill the open summer slot. In May 1997, Event Horizon's release date was scheduled for 1 August; The Houston Chronicle wrote that, if Paramount marketed it effectively and audiences responded well, it could become a surprise box-office success.

Anderson has repeatedly criticised the rushed marketing campaign that accompanied the accelerated schedule for its August 1997 release. Limited time was available to develop trailers, posters, and promotional materials. He has described the final theatrical poster as particularly unsatisfactory, remarking that "you could throw a plate at the screen and randomly select a better image." Bolt lobbied hard for a poster of Jack in his spacesuit in the meat-grinder-like containment to the gravity drive. Anderson agreed it would have been better than the final poster design. The campaign, in his view, failed to convey the film's horror intensity and instead positioned it somewhat generically as a space adventure from the studio behind Star Trek. Anderson later stated that Paramount "almost sold it as a slightly darker version of Star Trek or something." The film opened against stronger summer competition, including Air Force One, and was characterized by Anderson as a "feel-bad" movie placed in a "feel-good" season.

An episode of HBO First Look featuring behind-the-scenes footage of the film's production first aired on American television in July 1997. A novelization of the film, written by Steven Edward McDonald, was also published on 1 August 1997.

The film premiered in Beverly Hills, California on 12 August 1997, with Fishburne, Neill, Quinlan, and Isaacs among those in attendance. Three days later, it was released in American theaters. Paramount released it in the United States and Canada, while it was distributed in international markets by United International Pictures (UIP), including in the United Kingdom.

== Reception ==
=== Box office ===
Event Horizon grossed $9.5 million during its opening weekend in the United States and Canada, showing in over 2,311 theaters and ranking fourth at the box office behind the debuting Cop Land ($13.5 million) and the holdovers Air Force One ($12.4 million) and Conspiracy Theory ($12.3 million). In the United Kingdom, it earned US$1.7 million in its first four days on 207 screens and ranked third behind Men in Black and Bean; Variety described the opening as "solid but not spectacular". It ultimately ended its run in UK theaters with £3.6 million.

In its second weekend the film fell 54 percent to $4.4 million from 2,328 theaters, dropping to seventh place behind the debuts of G.I. Jane and Money Talks, as well as Air Force One, the new release Mimic, Conspiracy Theory and Cop Land. In its third weekend (the Labor Day frame) it declined a further 29 percent to $3.1 million, falling to eleventh place. The following weekend it dropped to thirteenth with $1.3 million as the theater count was reduced to 1,630. By its fifth weekend it had fallen to fifteenth place with under $1 million, and it left the top 20 by its sixth weekend in mid-September, ultimately finishing its American run with $26.7 million.

Paramount began a wider international rollout in mid-September. The film opened to $721,809 from 120 screens in Australia; $315,539 from 25 screens in South Korea; $319,777 from 24 screens in Singapore; $302,370 from 64 prints in Italy; and $354,000 in five days on 128 screens in France. The film's foreign cume was roughly $20.4 million by May 1998. A delayed 13 July 1998 release in Spain sold 366,515 tickets and grossed nearly €1.3 million; it was distributed there by Universal Pictures International.

The film was a major box-office bomb. (Note: Attributed to multiple references:) In late September 1997, while it was still in release, Viacom (Paramount's parent) stock fell 5 percent after Wall Street analysts cut third-quarter cash-flow forecasts, partly citing a write-off on Event Horizon; no amount for which was disclosed. According to the industry magazine BoxOffice, its worldwide theatrical total was $47.1 million.

=== Critical response ===
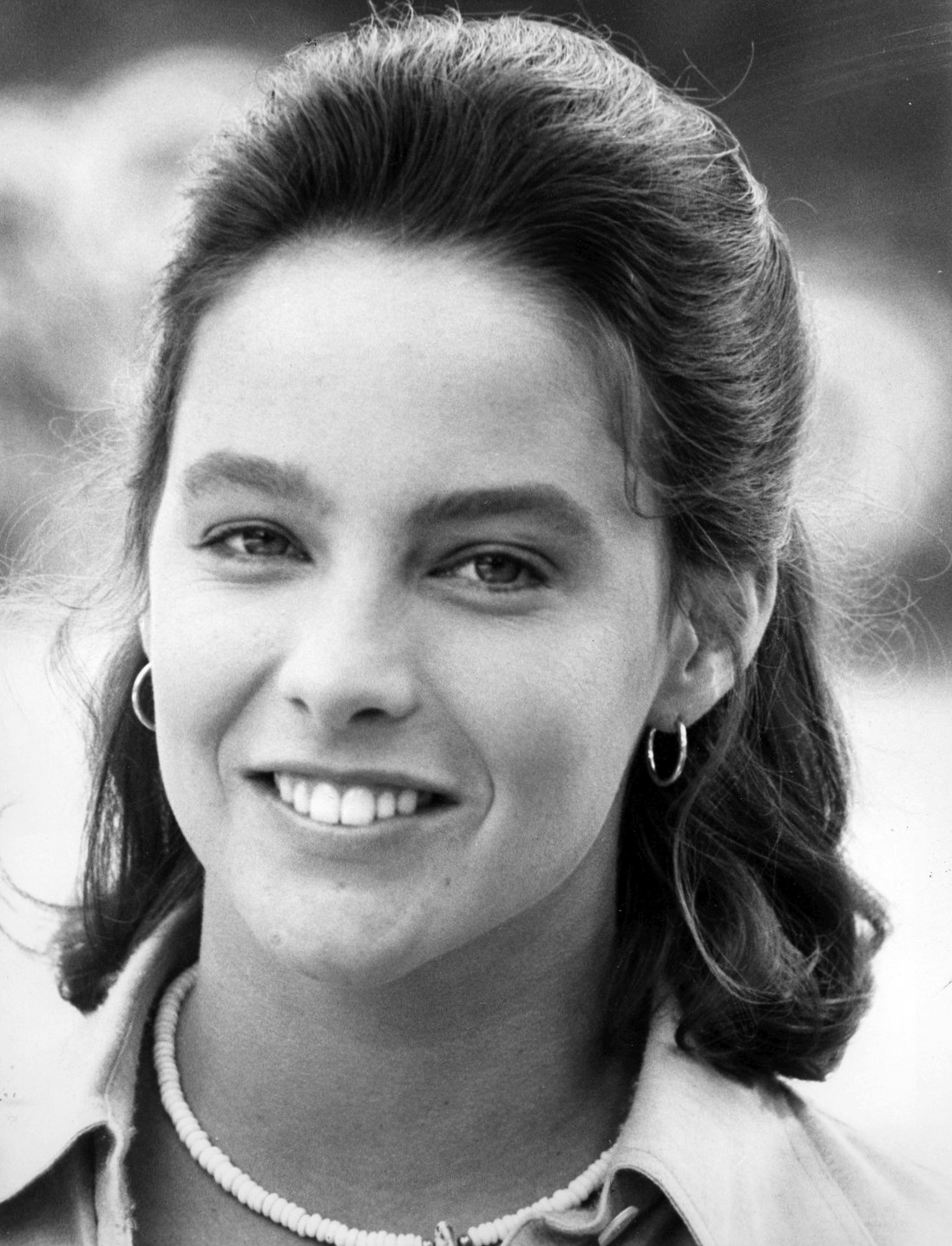
Kathleen Quinlan (pictured in 1975) was singled out for praise by critics at Variety and The Washington Post for her performance. The Washington Post described her as a "close second" to Fishburne's.

Upon release, Event Horizon received mostly negative reviews from critics, (Note: Attributed to multiple references:) who often dismissed it as superficial, derivative, and overly gory. On the review aggregator website Rotten Tomatoes, 36% of 96 critics' reviews are positive, with an average rating of 5.4/10. The website's consensus reads: "Despite a strong opening that promises sci-fi thrills, Event Horizon quickly devolves into an exercise of style over substance whose flashy effects and gratuitous gore fail to mask its overreliance on horror clichés." Metacritic, which uses a weighted average, assigned the film a score of 35 out of 100, based on 20 critics, indicating "generally unfavorable" reviews. Audiences polled by CinemaScore gave the film an average grade of "D+" on an A+ to F scale.

Roger Ebert gave the film two out of four stars, commending its atmosphere and noting the opening portion as particularly well crafted; however, he felt it never managed to become the intense, thought-provoking experience it wanted to be. The Washington Post critic Stephen Hunter asserted it was more devotion to style than scares and a satisfying explanation of its supernatural experiences. Scott Rosenberg described it as a haunted-house story "dressed up in scanty shreds of physics jargon" and mostly interested in empty eye sockets and "rivers of bubbling blood." MaryAnn Johanson said the search-and-rescue setup "had such promise" before the film "degenerat[ed] into a schlocky, unnecessarily gory, boring horror flick." In a lukewarm review, Empire magazine wrote: "That the film never fulfils its promise is down to its over reliance on horror vagaries in a precision-built sci-fi milieu, ultimately leaving too many unanswered queries. A sharper script and a more credible solution could have turned this impressive hokum into a force to be reckoned with".

Critics frequently noted the film's evident influences, often describing it as "The Shining in space" or an Alien knockoff. Ebert and Jonathan Rosenbaum particularly highlighted the debt to Solaris (1972), with Ebert arguing that the earlier film handled similar themes more effectively. The Austin Chronicle reviewer called it a "steadily churning debacle" that abandoned what little logic its plot had once the rescue crew boarded the ship, arguing it was "Hellraiser II in outer space" and that borrowings from The Shining, The Haunting, Aliens (1986), and The City of Lost Children (1995) were no substitute for "a plot worth bothering with." Other films critics compared Event Horizon to include Fantastic Voyage (1966), 2001: A Space Odyssey (1968), Raise the Titanic (1980), Stargate (1994), Seven (1995), and Hellraiser: Bloodline (1996).

Reviewers also objected to the film's volume and jump-scare style. Hunter said the film was "pointlessly loud, arbitrarily loud, assaultively loud", and The Independent called it "loud and nasty". The Globe and Mail's critic remarked that the "conventional pop-up scares and gross-out effects" felt "less terrifying than quaint." Barbara Shulgasser of the San Francisco Examiner similarly criticized the "clanging sound effects", Kamen's "hideous and obtrusive" score, and Anderson's "quick flashes of blood-drenched gore," even while calling the film "kind of a hoot" in an overblown way.

Critics frequently commented on the film's stylized visuals and production design. Some praised elements of the mise-en-scène while finding that the emphasis on style and design overshadowed substance in its narrative. Ebert liked the "anachronistic details" but concluded there was "not much substance beneath it", describing the film as "all style, climax and special effects" in which "the rules change with every scene." Stephen Holden argued that the heavy use of "glitzy" effects served mainly to mask a lack of underlying ideas. Others were more positive about the production values: Mike Clark described its design as "visually staggering… truly an event itself." Kenneth Turan highlighted Bennett's "arresting" production design and the "brooding, at times almost medieval sets," which he found "as convincing as they are different" and "expertly photographed" by Biddle. Joe Leydon, writing for Variety, noted the "impressive production values", especially the miniature work and "eye-popping" Daylight Station shot. Empire called the film "superbly styled in techno-Gothic space-grunge chic", praising its original effects and camerawork. Owen Gleiberman described director Anderson as "a stylist to watch" while still faulting the script.

Several critics praised the ensemble cast even as they faulted the film as a whole. Hunter, Turan, and Leydon highlighted the strong work of Fishburne, Neill, and Quinlan in particular, with Fishburne regarded as the strongest and Quinlan noted as a "close second" by Hunter. James Berardinelli remarked that Neill was able to create more of a distinct character than most of the supporting players because he had the most material to work with, while deeming Jones's comic-relief turn as the most memorable performance. Variety, however, also countered the cast worked "far beyond the call of duty, but to little avail" and were sometimes forced to deliver "inadvertently hilarious" lines. Anderson later noted that critics at the time failed to appreciate the film's sense of humor; certain lines reviewers saw as unintentionally funny had in fact been done intentionally by the filmmakers.

A few reviewers defend the film. Total Film rated it three out of five stars and praised its special effects and Alien-esque atmosphere. Gleiberman gave it a B−, noting that despite its derivative elements, "it unleashes some of the most unsettling horror imagery in years". Time Out found it never dull, crediting its avoidance of standard space-monster tropes and effective use of jump-scare sound design.

== Post-release ==
=== Performance analysis and aftermath ===
Retrospective accounts have tied Event Horizon's weak theatrical run to its release date and marketing. As noted by IndieWire, it arrived a month after the lighthearted science-fiction box-office hits Men in Black and Contact, and was jarringly darker by comparison. Anderson later said the film was not a summer picture and should have opened in fall 1997 nearer Halloween. He called rushing post-production—at Paramount's request, to fill the slot left by the delayed Titanic—his biggest mistake, and disliked the marketing campaign that sold the film to science-fiction and Star Trek fans rather than as horror. He recalled an executive telling him, "We're the studio that makes Star Trek!", as if the film were "besmirching" the franchise. Eisner likewise said Paramount "[didn't know] what they had".

The failure left Anderson despondent. While preparing Soldier (1998), he screened the film for Kurt Russell, who predicted that in twenty years it would be one he was glad he had made. Anderson has often repeated the remark and has stayed proud of the work, later describing it as having "the best looking stuff [he has] ever shot". On the audio commentary, he recalled that Fishburne later contacted him during the production of The Matrix (1999) to thank him, stating that the wire-work on Event Horizon had prepared him for the physical demands of that film and that he "would've died" on The Matrix without it. Anderson also said Richard T. Jones' wife told him it was Jones' favourite film.

Isaacs remembered producer Gordon suggesting they leave an opening-night screening of the film for dinner, and later described "a funny bond" among the cast after the film found an audience. Neill has called the theatrical version "half an hour too short" and "cut like it was on speed", saying he "always felt cheated" by it and would welcome a director's cut. He has also noted the film's later fame: "people seem to have seen it and it just sort of sears itself into their imagination." Quinlan recalled that she defended the film during a conversation with Titanic director James Cameron, who had argued that its failure was because audiences had wanted to see a "manifestation of a creature".

Bolt, who continued to work with Anderson, later called the production a "baptism of fire" and "a great training ground for Resident Evil", adding that he had always thought the film was "damn good" and found its rediscovery "extremely gratifying".

=== Home media ===
Although Event Horizon underperformed theatrically, it became a major success on home video and developed a cult following from it. This began when Paramount first released it on DVD in December 1998, as a basic release that included the theatrical trailer as the only special feature. By 2004, strong DVD sales prompted the studio to offer Anderson funding for a director's cut that would reintegrate deleted scenes; Anderson noted that locating the materials after many years would be difficult; alternatives under discussion at the time included separate deleted scenes with commentary or a branching edition. The excised footage had not been carefully stored, and much of it was missing. The director's cut was therefore abandoned. In its place, Paramount released a special-edition two-DVD set featuring one deleted scene, two extended scenes, and a few shots of deleted material within the making-of featurette; the recovered footage was of videotape quality.

A two-disc Collector's Edition DVD was released in 2006, featuring an audio commentary by Anderson and Bolt, several making-of featurettes, deleted scenes and other supplements. Paramount had originally scheduled that DVD release for 2005; the commentary track was recorded in 2004 after an unsuccessful initial attempt by Anderson. On 23 March 2021, Shout! Factory issued a new Collector's Edition Blu-ray that included a 4K transfer from the original camera negative, the special features from the 2006 edition, and newly recorded interviews with the cast and crew.

In an Event Horizon Q&A in 2011, Anderson stated that extra footage would never be made available, explaining that much of it was gone forever. The following year, he announced that producer Levin had located a VHS tape containing the original rough cut; Anderson planned to view the recovered footage for the first time since assembling the film after completing Resident Evil: Retribution. In a January 2017 interview he reiterated that a director's cut would never be released because the footage no longer existed. Regarding the VHS tape, he said neither he nor Levin had yet watched it, as Levin had moved to Spain, though he remained eager to do so at some point.

=== Plagiarism accusations ===
In later years, filmmaker William Malone accused Event Horizon of plagiarising from his unproduced script Dead Star, which had circulated among major Hollywood studios for roughly a decade. Dead Star's script was set in the distant future and centered on a rescue crew investigating a long-missing spaceship; the crew discovers an alien machine capable of opening a portal to Hell, portrayed as a literal parallel dimension. The device unleashes nightmarish manifestations and ultimately allows Satan to appear and wreak havoc. Malone stated that it "got knocked off by five or six different movies—most notably Event Horizon", adding that "[he has] to imagine that—because Event Horizon is so similar—major portions of it were lifted from [his] script." He did not pursue legal action, later explaining that "for [him], life is too short to sue people."

Dead Star later served as the basis for Supernova (2000), though by then Malone was no longer involved and the finished film differed substantially from his original concept. Because Event Horizon had already been released, Supernova underwent significant reworking to avoid appearing to imitate it and other recent science-fiction films. Film Stories remarked that H. R. Giger's designs for Dead Star appeared to influence Event Horizon more strongly than Supernova. In its review of Event Horizon, The Digital Bits noted similarities suggesting the production had borrowed heavily from Dead Star, though no one associated with the film has acknowledged this; the review observed that Event Horizon altered the nature of the portal and made the ship itself the primary source of evil. Dead Star was pitched in the late 1980s as "Hellraiser in space"; a description Screen Slate also gave Event Horizon.

=== Financing litigation ===
Event Horizon was partly financed by Paramount Pictures through a 1996 insurance-backed slate deal with ICE Insured Finance LLC. and JPMorgan. The arrangement was one of several slate financing structures Paramount used in the mid-1990s to share production risk. The ICE-insured slate specifically covered the Paramount releases Event Horizon, The Saint, Face/Off, and Twilight (1998). Under the structure, JPMorgan arranged loans to special-purpose entities that purchased profit-participation rights in the films. Insurance policies were intended to make the loans largely risk-free by covering any shortfalls between loan obligations and film revenues.

Insurers later claimed that the loans connected to the slate, including those related to Event Horizon, had been fraudulently obtained. This left JPMorgan and related banks responsible for the outstanding amounts. Related insurance litigation arising from the structure was settled around 2004. Following that settlement, JPMorgan obtained control of the participation interests previously held by the special-purpose entities.

In 2010, Content Partners LLC, an asset-management firm that had acquired participation interests in the late-1990s Paramount slate of approximately 25 films (including Event Horizon), sued the studio. Content Partners alleged that Paramount had underpaid tens of millions of dollars through improper cost allocations, inflated expenses, and inaccurate revenue reporting on the group of titles. Paramount filed a cross-complaint accusing Content Partners and JPMorgan of engaging in a civil conspiracy to transfer rights in the films without the studio's required consent. After several years of proceedings in the Los Angeles Superior Court, the parties reached a settlement in December 2013. Both sides denied any wrongdoing, the terms of the agreement were not publicly disclosed, and the case was dismissed with prejudice.

=== Other media ===
In 2025, Event Horizon: Dark Descent, a comic book prequel series, was published by IDW Publishing. The series implied that the demonic entity behind the incident of Event Horizon is named Paimon. After the success of this prequel series, a sequel comic book titled Event Horizon: Inferno was announced, set 200 years after the film.

In February 2026, it was announced that Titan Books was set to publish Event Horizon: The Making of the Classic Film as written by Janine Pipe. The book includes previously unseen archival material, and interviews with the cast and crew as well as an introduction written by Anderson himself. The book was set for release on 1 September 2026, but was later delayed to an August 24, 2027 release.

== Legacy ==
Flag similar to that featured on the uniform of the Australian character portrayed by Neill, which attracted attention in 2020

Official Flag of Australia

In the years since its release, Event Horizon has developed a cult following and has been referenced in other works of popular culture. In 2022 retrospectives for the 25th anniversary of its release, IGN noted its impact on other media such as the Dead Space video game series, and Rotten Tomatoes wrote that "its unforgettable imagery, standout cast, and escalating thrills have made it a celebrated cult classic for horror aficionados". Total Film said "the film has been cemented in pop culture history as both a cult classic and vital addition to the sci-fi/horror subgenre". Collider called it "a grand, ambitious vision that tries to marry elements from the Alien films (the first half-hour or so hews very closely to Aliens) with spiritual depth. It doesn't quite pull all of it together, but where the pieces do fit work better than expected, a film aiming for A+ that is content with its B grade. So yes, Event Horizon is indeed worthy of its reevaluation." Fangoria's Scott Wampler said that this was Anderson's best film. Of the film's re-evaluation, Anderson said, "It's finally got the reaction now that I was hoping it would get 25 years ago." In 2024, Variety named Event Horizon as the 94th best horror film of all time.

The scene in the film where Weir illustrates how wormholes work with a pen and paper was replicated in Christopher Nolan's Interstellar (2014) and Taika Waititi's Thor: Love and Thunder (2022). A separate sequence, depicting the rotating tunnel lined with sharp blades leading to the ship's engine room, inspired the "Chompers" sequence leading to the "Omega 13" in Galaxy Quest (1999). Other films influenced by Event Horizon include Sunshine (2007), Pandorum (2009), Lockout (2012), As Above, So Below (2014), Infini (2015), The Cloverfield Paradox (2018), and Ad Astra (2019).

In video games, Event Horizon has been cited as an influence on several titles. Dead Space (2008) creator Glen Schofield noted: "The idea of a spaceship going to hell… that's something just crazy and I wanted to create something like that." He also praised its background storytelling and sense of isolation. The film also inspired games such as Destiny 2 (2017), Hellpoint (2020), The Callisto Protocol (2022), Starfield (2023), and Directive 8020 (2026).

In 2020, online commotion arose regarding Neill's influence on the design of his character's uniform, which featured an Australian flag patch with the Australian Aboriginal flag instead of the Union Jack as its canton. Neill had suggested the design; he had thought that by the film's 2047 setting, Australia would be a republic and would acknowledge Indigenous history on its flag. He responded and reaffirmed the choice. Following Neill's death in 2026, The Hollywood Reporter noted that "a large part of [the film's] cult status is owed to [Neill]".

Many Warhammer 40,000 fans have also embraced the film as an unofficial prequel to the franchise.

== Future ==
=== Potential films ===
In December 2011, Anderson and Bolt said they had been discussing additional movies to expand the Event Horizon story as a prequel and a sequel. Potential stories to be developed include following the first crew aboard the Event Horizon and their mission that led to their disappearance for seven years, as well as a continuation film detailing the events that followed the rescue of Starck, Cooper, and Justin. By October 2020 however, after years of no development, Anderson stated that he had not returned to the property in any continuation because he did not want to take away from the experience of the original film.

=== Television series ===
In August 2019, reports surfaced that Paramount Television and Amazon Studios were developing a television series based on the film. Adam Wingard will direct the series, in addition to serving as executive producer alongside Larry Gordon, Lloyd Levin, both of whom previously had held producer roles on the film, and Jeremy Platt. In March 2024, Wingard provided a brief update stating, "It's definitely in the works. I've just been in Godzilla land for so long. I wouldn't say that there's definitive traction in terms of it moving forward, but we have a fucking amazing script. Once this movie's over, it's just about refocusing my attention towards getting that set up." As of May 2025, the series was still believed to be actively in development.
