= Firestarter (novel) =

1980 novel by Stephen King

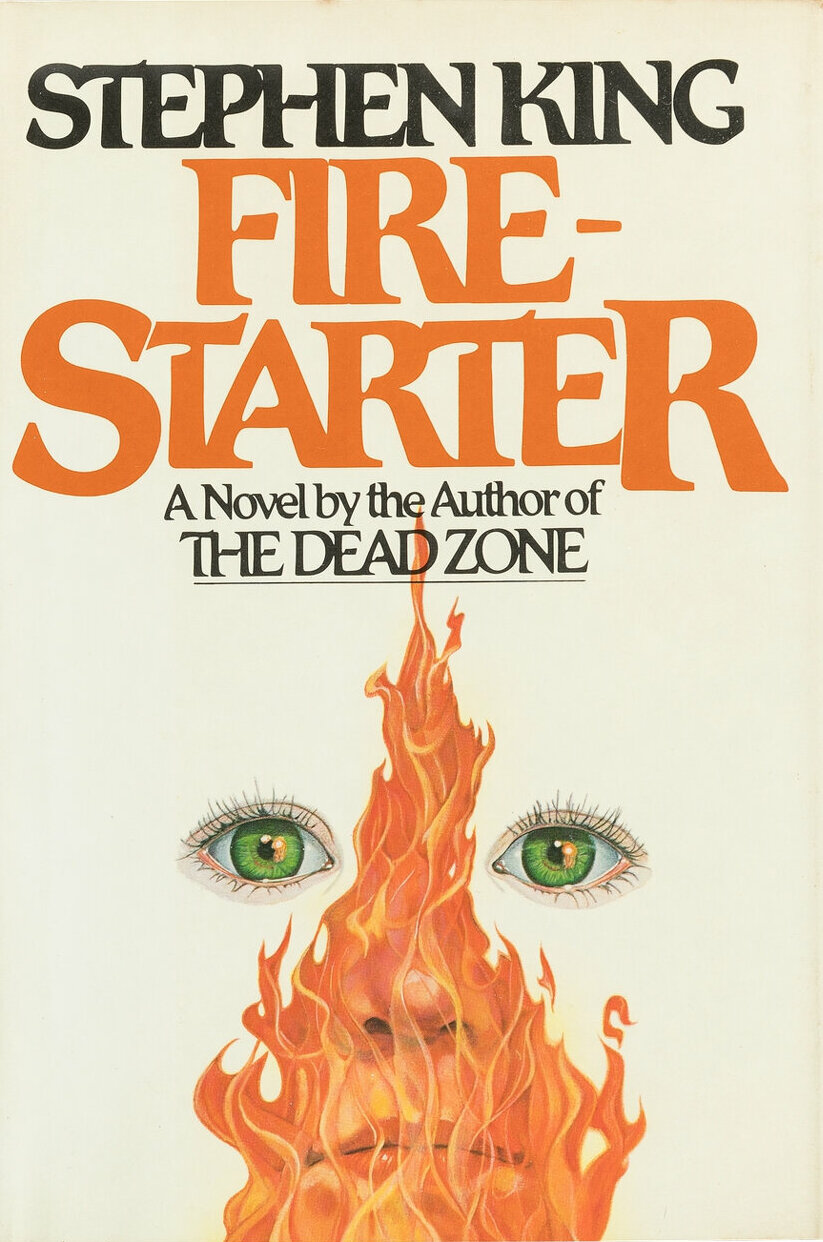
- First edition cover
- Author: Stephen King
- Language: English
- Genre: Horror thriller Science fiction
- Publisher: Viking Press
- Publication date: September 29, 1980
- Publication place: United States
- Media type: Print (Hardcover)
- Pages: 426
- ISBN: 978-0670315413

Firestarter is a science fiction-horror thriller novel by Stephen King, first published in September 1980. It tells the story of a young girl, Charlie McGee, with the ability of pyrokinesis, whose destructive force a ruthless government agency tries to harness for their own purposes. In July and August 1980, two excerpts from the novel were published in Omni. The novel entered the New York Times' Best-Sellers List on August 24, 1980. In 1981, Firestarter was nominated as Best Novel for the British Fantasy Award, Locus Poll Award, and Balrog Award. In 1984, it was adapted into a film. A miniseries follow-up to the film, Firestarter: Rekindled, was released in 2002 on the Sci-Fi Channel and a remake from Blumhouse Productions was released on 13 May 2022. The book is dedicated to author Shirley Jackson: "In Memory of Shirley Jackson, who never needed to raise her voice."

== Plot summary ==
Andrew "Andy" and Charlene "Charlie" McGee are a father/daughter pair on the run from a government agency known as The Shop. During his college years, Andy had participated in a Shop experiment dealing with "Lot 6", a drug with hallucinogenic effects similar to LSD. The drug gave his future wife, Victoria “Vicky” Tomlinson, minor telekinetic abilities and him a telepathic form of mind control he refers to as "the push". They both also developed telepathic abilities. Andy's and Vicky's powers were physiologically limited; in his case, overuse of the push gives him crippling migraine headaches and minute brain hemorrhages, but their daughter Charlie develops a frighteningly strong pyrokinetic ability.

The novel begins in medias res with Charlie and Andy on the run from Shop agents in NYC, the latest in a series of attempts by the Shop to capture Andy and Charlie following a disastrous raid on the McGee family in suburban Ohio. After years of Shop surveillance, a botched operation to take Charlie leaves her mother dead; Andy, receiving a psychic flash while having lunch with colleagues, rushes home to discover his wife murdered and his daughter kidnapped. He then uses his push ability to track Charlie and the Shop agents, catching up to them at a rest stop on the Interstate. He uses the push to incapacitate the Shop's agents, leaving one blind and the other comatose. Charlie and Andy flee and begin a life of running and hiding, using assumed identities. They move several times to avoid discovery before the Shop catches up to them in New York.

Using a combination of the push, Charlie's power, and hitchhiking, the pair escape through Albany and are briefly taken in by a farmer named Irv Manders near the fictional town of Hastings Glen, New York; however, they are tracked down by Shop agents, who attempt to kill Andy and take Charlie at the Manders farm. At Andy's instruction, Charlie unleashes her power, incinerating the entire farm and fending off the agents, killing a few of them. With nowhere else to turn, the pair flee to the fictional town of Tashmore, Vermont, and takes refuge in a cabin that had once belonged to Andy's grandfather.

With the Manders farm operation disastrously botched, The Shop's director, Captain James "Cap" Hollister, calls in a Shop assassin named John Rainbird to capture the fugitives. Rainbird, a Cherokee and a Vietnam War veteran, is intrigued by Charlie's power and eventually becomes obsessed with her, determined to befriend her and eventually kill her. This time, the operation is successful, and both Andy and Charlie are taken by the Shop.

The pair are separated and imprisoned at the Shop headquarters, located in the fictional D.C. suburb of Longmont, Virginia. With his spirit broken, Andy becomes an overweight drug addict, seemingly loses his power, and is eventually deemed useless by the Shop. Charlie, however, defiantly refuses to cooperate with the Shop and won’t demonstrate her power for them. Six months pass until a power failure provides a turning point for the two: Andy, sick with fear and self-pity, somehow regains the push – subconsciously pushing himself to overcome his addiction – and Rainbird, masquerading as a simple janitor, befriends Charlie and gains her trust.

By pretending to still be powerless and addicted, Andy manages to gain crucial information by pushing his psychiatrist. Under Rainbird's guidance, Charlie begins to demonstrate her power, which has grown to fearsome levels. After the suicide of his psychiatrist, Andy is able to meet and push Cap, using him to plan his and Charlie's escape from the facility, as well as to finally communicate with Charlie. Rainbird, however, discovers Andy's plan and decides to use it to his advantage.

Andy's plan succeeds, and he and Charlie are reunited in a barn for the first time in six months, but Rainbird is already there, planning to kill them both. A crucial distraction is Cap, who is losing his mind due to a side effect of being pushed. Andy pushes Rainbird off the upper level of the barn, breaking his leg. Rainbird then shoots Andy in the neck and fires another shot at Charlie, but she uses her power to melt the bullet in midair, and then sets Rainbird and Cap on fire. Mortally wounded, Andy then instructs Charlie to use her power to escape and to inform the public, to make sure the government cannot do anything like this ever again. After he dies, Charlie, grief-stricken and furious, sets the barn on fire; she then uses her pyrokinesis to kill the employees and blow up their getaway vehicles. The military is called, but Charlie obliterates their vehicles; when they fire at her, she melts their bullets. Charlie blows up the building, leaving the entire Shop facility burning, with almost everyone dead.

The event is covered up by the government and released to the media as a terrorist firebomb attack. The Shop quickly reforms, under new leadership, and begins a manhunt for Charlie, who has returned to the Manders' farm. After some deliberation, she comes up with a plan and leaves the Manders', just ahead of Shop operatives, and heads to NYC. She decides on Rolling Stone magazine as an unbiased, honest media source with no ties to the government, and the book ends as she arrives to tell them her story.

== Adaptations ==
- Firestarter was adapted into a film of the same name in 1984. It was directed by Mark L. Lester and starred Drew Barrymore as Charlie, David Keith as Andy, and George C. Scott as Rainbird. It also starred Heather Locklear as Vicky and Martin Sheen as Cap.
  - On the February 3, 2007 episode of Saturday Night Live, host Drew Barrymore reprised her role as Charlie McGee, now an adult and married, in a fake commercial for "Firestarter Brand Smoked Sausages."
- A TV miniseries sequel, Firestarter: Rekindled, was made in 2002. It starred Marguerite Moreau as a grown-up Charlie and Malcolm McDowell as Rainbird.
- A second film adaptation was released in 2022 and was directed by Keith Thomas from a screenplay by Scott Teems.

== See also ==
- 1980 in literature
- 1980s in film
- Golden Years (miniseries)
