= Philip Eisner =

American screenwriter (born 1965)

- Born: Philip Robert Eisner; August 23, 1965 (age 61); Fort Worth, Texas, U.S.
- Education: Stanford University (BA)
- Occupation: Screenwriter
- Years active: 1990–present
- Known for: Event Horizon
- Spouse: Johnna Tyrrell
- Children: 1

Philip Robert Eisner (born August 23, 1965) is an American screenwriter. He is best known for writing the 1997 science fiction horror film Event Horizon, which was directed by Paul W. S. Anderson. His other screen credits include Firestarter: Rekindled (2002), Mutant Chronicles (2009), and Sweet Girl (2021).

== Early life ==
Philip Robert Eisner was born on August 23, 1965, in Fort Worth, Texas. He has an older brother and sister. His father, Thomas M. Eisner (1931–1992), was a real-estate developer and former president of the Windmill Dinner Theater; he died at age 60 in February 1992 from injuries sustained in a skiing accident at Taos Ski Valley, New Mexico. The loss affected Eisner, who had just begun writing Event Horizon, making it difficult for him to maintain momentum on the project.

He grew up in Fort Worth and graduated from Fort Worth Country Day School. He later earned a Bachelor of Arts in Communication from Stanford University.

== Career ==
Eisner's professional screenwriting career began with the sale of his second original screenplay. In addition to writing the film Event Horizon, Eisner also wrote Firestarter: Rekindled for Sci Fi (now known as Syfy) which was produced in 2002. In early 2005, Scott Rudin Productions acquired Eisner's supernatural thriller spec script Furious Angels. Eisner also wrote the screenplay for Mutant Chronicles, which was released in 2009 and stars Thomas Jane and John Malkovich. The film tells the tale of 28th century soldiers battling so-called "NecroMutants."

Eisner was the lead screenwriter for Sweet Girl released in 2021. The film is about a devastated husband who vows to bring justice to the people responsible for his wife's death while protecting the only family he has left, his daughter. The film stars Jason Momoa.

Eisner writes the comic book Bad Guys which is coordinated by Kevin Spacey's TV/film production company Trigger Street Productions and Kickstart Comics.

He has also taught several screenwriting courses at the UCLA Extension since 2006.
