= Firestarter: Rekindled =

2002 television film directed by Robert Iscove

- Title card
- Based on: Firestarter by Stephen King
- Written by: Philip Eisner
- Directed by: Robert Iscove
- Starring: Marguerite Moreau; Malcolm McDowell; Danny Nucci; Dennis Hopper
- Music by: Randy Miller
- Country of origin: United States
- Original language: English

Production
- Producer: Jeff Morton
- Cinematography: David Boyd
- Editor: Casey O Rohns
- Running time: 168 minutes
- Production companies: USA Films; Traveler's Rest Films

Original release
- Network: Sci Fi Channel
- Release: March 10 – March 11, 2002

Related
- Firestarter

Firestarter: Rekindled (retitled Firestarter 2: Rekindled for home video) is an American two-part television miniseries. It serves as a sequel to the 1984 film adaptation of the 1980 Stephen King novel Firestarter. It stars Marguerite Moreau as now-adult Charlie McGee, along with Danny Nucci, Dennis Hopper, and Malcolm McDowell as Charlie's old nemesis from the original story, John Rainbird. It debuted as a Sci Fi Pictures miniseries on the Sci Fi Channel over two nights in March 2002.

== Plot ==
Vincent Sforza (Danny Nucci) works for a large, influential research firm, and he has been put in charge of locating several people who were part of an old experiment from the 1970s—an experiment in which a group of college students were given a dose of a chemical called LOT-6. Apparently, the victims of the experiment have won a class action lawsuit and need to be found so that a check can be issued. Included on the list is Charlene "Charlie" McGee (Marguerite Moreau), the offspring of two of the participants in the experiment. Charlie is now in her 20s.

When Charlie was a kid, her mother Vicky (Karrie Combs) was murdered by agents for the now-defunct Shop, the government department that wanted to harness her pyrokinesis as a military weapon, and her father Andy (Aaron Radl) was killed by John Rainbird, a professional killer hired by the Shop. Ever since then, Charlie has been in hiding to protect herself. Under an assumed name, she now works at a university library, where she secretly researches how to suppress her pyrokinetic abilities.

When Vincent finally locates Charlie, he unintentionally triggers a series of events with deadly consequences. It turns out that the class action lawsuit settlement is nonexistent. John Rainbird (Malcolm McDowell), thought to have been burned to death by Charlie, is still alive, scarred from the burns—and he is looking for Charlie, still obsessed with her. Rainbird has been using the nonexistent class action lawsuit to lure the original LOT-6 experiment's surviving victims out of hiding, so they can be killed individually in order to keep things quiet.

James Richardson (Dennis Hopper), one of the victims of the LOT-6 experiment, helps Charlie, with the experiment having enabled him to tell the future. When Vincent discovers that he has been duped into luring Charlie back to Rainbird, he also decides to help Charlie.

Rainbird has been working on perfecting the LOT experiments, and he has created six young boys with rather unusual abilities. One has the power of suggestion, another can sense the truth and lies, two have telekinesis, one has a destructive voice from Hell, and the most dangerous one of them all is an energy sync, who can suck the life and energy out of anyone or anything.

Rainbird is using these children to rob a bank as a test of warfare in the new decade. With Vincent and James on her side, Charlie must decide whether to keep running, or fight Rainbird to the end. Charlie chooses to fight to the end, and after Rainbird kills Vincent (to Charlie's dismay), Charlie kills Rainbird by taking him into a fiery embrace, turning him into a pile of ashes.

Charlie then engages the energy sync and uses her powers to fight and destroy him, and the other boys realize that Charlie was telling them the truth when she told them that they become a little less human every time they use their abilities. Charlie, finally no longer needing to hide, later boards a bus to Canada.

== Cast ==
- Marguerite Moreau as Charlene "Charlie" McGee
  - Skye McCole Bartusiak as Young Charlie McGee
- Malcolm McDowell as John Rainbird
- Dennis Hopper as James Richardson
- Danny Nucci as Vincent Sforza
- John Dennis Johnston as Joel Lowen
- Darnell Williams as Gil
- Ron Perkins as Special Agent Pruitt
- Deborah Van Valkenburgh as Mary Conant
- Dan Byrd as Paul
- Travis Charitan as Cody
- Scotty Cox as Andrew
- Emmett Shoemaker as Edward
- Devon Alan as Max
- Eric Jacobs as Jack
- Aaron Radl as Andy McGee
- Karrie Combs as Vicky McGee

== Release ==
Firestarter: Rekindled debuted as a Sci Fi Pictures two-night miniseries on the Sci Fi Channel March 10–11, 2002.
