= Julia Wong (film editor) =

American film editor

- Occupation: Film editor
- Years active: 1995–present

Julia Wong is an American film editor best known for her diverse body of work on blockbusters like X-Men: The Last Stand (2006) and Hercules (2014); comedies like The Pink Panther 2 (2009), Extract (2009), Unpregnant (2020), and Hocus Pocus 2 (2022); thrillers like Child's Play (2019); and the musical remake of Valley Girl (2020).

In film school, she won the Eddie Award for Best Student Editing from American Cinema Editors (ACE). After two decades in film and television, Wong has become a member of ACE as well as the Academy of Motion Picture Arts and Sciences. She won a Satellite Award for Best Film Editing on X-Men: The Last Stand, which she co-edited with Mark Helfrich and Mark Goldblatt. And she has been a guest speaker on panels for ACE, the Motion Picture Editors Guild, and the Los Angeles Asian Pacific Film Festival (LAAPFF).

== Filmography ==
Editor
Year	Film	Director	Notes	Ref.
2004	The Seat Filler	Nick Castle		
2005	Santa's Slay	David Steiman		
2006	X-Men: The Last Stand	Brett Ratner	Second collaboration with Brett Ratner	
2007	Good Luck Chuck	Mark Helfrich		
2009	The Pink Panther 2	Harald Zwart		
2009	Extract	Mike Judge		
2011	Red Riding Hood	Catherine Hardwicke	First collaboration with Catherine Hardwicke	
2013	Plush	Catherine Hardwicke	Second collaboration with Catherine Hardwicke	
2014	Hercules	Brett Ratner	Third collaboration with Brett Ratner	
2016	The Belko Experiment	Greg McLean		
2017	The Last Word	Mark Pellington		
2018	The Domestics	Mike P. Nelson		
2019	Child's Play	Lars Klevberg		
2020	Gretel & Hansel	Oz Perkins		
2020	Valley Girl	Rachel Lee Goldenberg	First collaboration with Rachel Lee Goldenberg	
2020	Unpregnant	Rachel Lee Goldenberg	Second collaboration with Rachel Lee Goldenberg	
2022	Last Seen Alive	Brian Goodman		
2022	Hocus Pocus 2	Anne Fletcher		
2025	Swiped	Rachel Lee Goldenberg	Third collaboration with Rachel Lee Goldenberg	
2026	The Last Sunrise	Carlson Young	First collaboration with Carlson Young	
2026	Clashing Through the Snow	Carlson Young	Second collaboration with Carlson Young	

Editorial department
Year	Film	Director	Role	Notes
1996	Wedding Bell Blues	Dana Lustig	Assistant editor	
1999	Foolish	Dave Meyers	Assistant editor	
1999	Simon Sez	Kevin Alyn Elders	Assistant editor	
2000	Next Friday	Steve Carr	Assistant editor	
2000	Stranger than Fiction	Eric Bross	Assistant editor	
2001	On the Borderline	Michael Oblowitz	Assistant editor	
2001	Tangled	Jay Lowi	Assistant editor	
2001	Out Cold	The Malloys	First assistant editor	
2002	Unfaithful	Adrian Lyne	Assistant editor	
2003	Honey	Bille Woodruff	Associate editor	
2004	After the Sunset	Brett Ratner	Additional editor	First collaboration with Brett Ratner
2007	Along the Way	Andrew Bowen	Assistant editor	

Thanks
Year	Film	Director	Role
2015	Barely Lethal	Kyle Newman	Thanks

Direct-to-video films

Editor
Year	Film	Director
2006	End Game	Andy Cheng

Shorts

Editor
Year	Film	Director
2002	The Fine Line Between Cute and Creepy	Robert D. Slane
2004	Mindgame	Jamie Neese

Cinematographer
Year	Film	Director
1995	The Chick That Was Naked	Kurt Fitzpatrick

TV movies

Editor
Year	Film	Director
2011	Rogue	Brett Ratner
2015	Ken Jeong Made Me Do It	Peter Segal

Editorial department
Year	Film	Director	Role
1997	Asteroid	Bradford May	Assistant editor
1998	When Husbands Cheat	Richard A. Colla	Assistant editor
1998	Gargantua	Bradford May	Assistant editor
2024	Descendants: The Rise of Red	Jennifer Phang	Additional editor

TV series

Editor
Year	Title	Notes
2002	The Pulse	3 episodes
2011	CHAOS	1 episode
2014	Reckless	2 episodes
2018	Black Lightning	1 episode
2022	Minx	1 episode

Editorial department
Year	Title	Role	Notes
1997	Asteroid	Assistant editor	2 episodes
2000	The Street	Assistant editor	7 episodes
2005	Prison Break	Additional editor	1 episode
