= Beware Boiúna =

2026 survival horror film directed by Mike P. Nelson

- Theatrical release poster
- Directed by: Mike P. Nelson
- Screenplay by: Alan B. McElroy
- Story by: Tony Giglio; Alan B. McElroy
- Produced by: Jeremy Bolt; Robert Kulzer
- Starring: Kiana Madeira; Jessica Rothe; Logan Marshall-Green
- Cinematography: Nick Junkersfeld
- Edited by: Tom Elkins
- Music by: Stephen Lukach
- Production companies: Constantin Film; JB Pictures
- Distributed by: Lionsgate Films (United States); Constantin Film (Germany)
- Release dates: September 17, 2026 (Fantastic Fest); October 2, 2026 (United States)
- Running time: 104 minutes
- Countries: United States; Germany
- Languages: English; Spanish
- Box office: $924,608

Beware Boiúna is a 2026 monster horror film directed by Mike P. Nelson from a screenplay by Alan B. McElroy, based on a story by Tony Giglio and McElroy. The film stars Kiana Madeira, Jessica Rothe, and Logan Marshall-Green. It follows a medical mission deep in the Amazon rainforest that encounters a colossal mythical serpent.

Beware Boiúna had its premiere at the Fantastic Fest on September 17, 2026, and was theatrically released in the United States by Lionsgate Films on October 2, 2026. The film received generally mixed reviews from critics.

== Plot ==
Deep in the Amazon rainforest along the Curuçá River, riverboat captain Raúl guides doctors Miguel, Alli, and Callum on a humanitarian mission to provide medical aid to various Colombian riverside villages. The boat's mechanic, Raúl's adopted daughter Lena, uses the trip as an opportunity to search for her brother Jorge, who has gone missing in the jungle after leaving to document illegal mining in the area. At one village, the group encounters a survey team led by brothers Brennan and Shawn Malloy whose goal is to search for areas of the jungle with potential for road site development. Incensed by their assignment, Alli attempts to strand the Malloys' boat in the river but is caught by Shawn, who attempts to rape her in revenge. Lena happens upon the scene and helps Alli fight back, causing Shawn to fall and fatally smash his head on the dock. Lena and Alli subsequently dump his body in the river to frame it as an accident.

After the doctors leave the village, Brennan and his team discover Shawn's body and learn what happened from a young village boy who witnessed his killing. Brennan contacts the doctors' boat about Shawn's death, forcing Lena and Alli to reveal their involvement, though Miguel affirms that they killed Shawn in self-defense and refuses to turn around. The doctors soon stop at another village which they find to be abandoned. Lena, Alli, and Miguel venture into the nearby jungle to search for the residents and discover the mutilated corpse of a man whom Miguel determines was likely digested and then spit back out by an animal.

The trio are soon attacked by Boiuna, a giant, mythological snake, who drags Miguel away and kills him. When Lena and Alli return to the dock, they find Brennan and his men have arrived and taken Raúl and Callum hostage in revenge for Shawn's death. Boiuna attacks the group moments later and Brennan's men are all killed in the ensuing chaos while Callum is accidentally shot and mortally wounded. Lena, Alli, and Raúl attempt to flee on the riverboat, but Boiuna kills Raúl before overturning the boat and devouring Alli. After Lena returns to land, Callum dies of his wounds while Boiuna chases Lena and Brennan into the jungle.

Lena and Brennan encounter two masked men, one of whom is revealed to be Jorge, who explains that he's joined a local militia dedicated to sabotaging and exposing illegal development projects in the jungle. Boiuna returns and kills Jorge's companion while the remaining trio are split up. As night falls, Lena happens upon a vacant mining site and attempts to trap Boiuna with a grapple truck, but Boiuna evades the trap and tries to crush Lena in the operator's cab. Brennan arrives and cuts open part of Boiuna with a chainsaw, only for Boiuna to turn her attention to him and devour him. Lena, thoroughly exhausted, accepts her fate and stares directly at Boiuna, though Boiuna, seemingly recognizing Lena as a worthy adversary, ignores her and leaves. Jorge and his men arrive and reunite with Lena, who thereafter joins them on a mission to kidnap illegal developers in the jungle and leave them tied up as food for Boiuna.

== Cast ==
- Kiana Madeira as Lena
- Jessica Rothe as Alli
- Logan Marshall-Green as Brennan Malloy
- Juan Pablo Shuk as Miguel
- Will Close as Callum
- Jackson Bews as Shawn Malloy
- Sergio Herrera as Jorge
- Vicente Peña as Pedro
- Mateo Moreno as Diego
- Jaime Newball as Raúl
- Christophe de Geest as Proctor
- Nelson Camayo as Guilherme
- Orlando Diago as Álvaro

== Production ==
=== Development ===
Producer Jeremy Bolt was inspired to pursue a monster movie after reading an article about the Titanoboa, the largest snake known to exist. A script was penned by Tony Giglio while Bolt contacted Mike P. Nelson about the prospect of directing the project, but Nelson was hesitant due to his perceived restraints of the genre. When Nelson felt he could give the film a unique spin, he partnered with Alan B. McElroy, whom he collaborated with on Wrong Turn, to write their own draft. The film was first announced under the name Titan in February 2024 with Kiana Madeira and Jessica Rothe attached in lead roles and Constantin Film's Robert Kulzer producing alongside Bolt. Rothe described the film as if "Sorcerer met Anaconda.

=== Writing and research ===
The narrative draws heavily from Brazilian folklore, specifically the legend of the Boiúna, also known as Cobra Grande, a gigantic mythical serpent said to inhabit the Amazon river basin. Nelson noted that the production aimed to ground the creature feature in realistic stakes, focusing heavily on character development, regional atmosphere, and authentic environmental tension before introducing the massive legacy predator.

=== Filming ===
Principal photography began on October 25, 2024 on location in the Amazon rainforest with Nick Junkersfeld as director of photography. A snake handler, who was former Colombian Special Forces, was employed to ensure safety of the cast and crew. Production was continuously disrupted by the jungle, with sets getting flooded and rain washing away crew members. Filming concluded on December 7 in Girardot.

=== Post-production ===
In February 2026, the film was officially retitled Boiuna: Legend of the Amazon. The project was retitled again by August 2026, this time to Beware Boiuna, following the film's initial marketing push.

== Release ==
Beware Boiuna received a theatrical release from Lionsgate on October 2, 2026. The studio was reported to be distributing the film in February 2026. Beware Boiuna made its world debut at Fantastic Fest on September 17, 2026.

== Reception ==
=== Critical response ===
On the review aggregator website Rotten Tomatoes, 58% of 62 critics' reviews are positive, with an average rating of 5.5/10. The website's consensus reads: "Devouring too much chaotic action and not enough genuine thrills, Beware Boiúna fails to make the most of its mythical monstrosity despite some creative narrative twists." On Metacritic, which utilizes a weighted average, assigned the film a score of 49 out of 100, based on 8 reviews, indicating "mixed or average" reviews.

William Bibbiani, writing for The Wrap, called the film "nasty, mean-spirited nightmare fuel" and highlighted Nelson's direction. For Slant Magazine, critic Rocco T. Thompson praised Junkersfeld's photography of the Amazon and said the film struck "a nice balance between delivering nail-biting thrills and taking a bite out of white meddling in the Global South." Meagan Navarro of Bloody Disgusting said Nelson "breathes new life into the niche animal attack category with relentless suspense, a mythic movie monster, and a cast of characters worth rooting for." Dread Central critic Matt Konopka praised the film as " the meanest, bloodiest, scariest giant snake film to ever slither onto screen," but detracted it for taking "itself so seriously that it forgets to have a little fun with the premise." Preston Barta, reviewing for the Denton Record-Chronicle, singled out Madeira's performance and positively compared the film to Jaws.

For The A.V. Club, Matthew Jackson commended Madeira and Rothe's performances but derided the film's "dim" lighting and for being "too rushed, and too focused on yet another snake jump scare, to let its successes breathe." Matt Donato of Daily Dead deemed the film as "underwhelming" and "slogging", writing "What sets itself up as the Anaconda reboot we deserve sputters into a poorly shot and blurrily edited creature feature." RogerEbert.com's Brian Tallerico was critical of the film's cinematography and editing, saying "To say it’s hard to follow would be an understatement. There’s no sense of space or geography, which means there’s no sense of actual threat if we can’t tell what’s happening or where anyone needs to go to escape it." Richard Whittaker of The Austin Chronicle panned the film, criticizing the characterization, visual effects, and negatively compared it to Predator and Aliens.
