= Good Luck Chuck =

2007 film by Mark Helfrich

- Theatrical release poster
- Directed by: Mark Helfrich
- Written by: Josh Stolberg
- Produced by: Mike Karz
- Starring: Dane Cook; Jessica Alba; Dan Fogler
- Cinematography: Anthony B. Richmond
- Edited by: Julia Wong
- Music by: Aaron Zigman
- Production company: Karz Entertainment
- Distributed by: Lionsgate
- Release date: September 21, 2007
- Running time: 99 minutes 101 minutes (unrated cut)
- Countries: United States; Canada
- Language: English
- Budget: $25 million
- Box office: $59.8 million

Good Luck Chuck is a 2007 romantic comedy film directed by Mark Helfrich, written by Josh Stolberg, and starring Dane Cook and Jessica Alba. In the film, women find their "one true love" after having sex with a dentist named Chuck (Cook). Chuck meets a girl named Cam (Alba) and tries to become her true love.

Good Luck Chuck was the directorial debut of Helfrich, a long-time film editor. The film was released in theaters on September 21, 2007, by Lionsgate, and was widely panned by critics, who criticized the humor and chemistry between Cook and Alba. Despite this, it grossed $59.8 million against a $25 million budget. One of its theatrical posters parodied the well-known Rolling Stone cover photographed by Annie Leibovitz featuring John Lennon and Yoko Ono in similar poses.

== Plot ==
While playing spin the bottle / seven minutes in heaven at a party in 1985, 10-year-old Charlie "Chuck" Logan refuses the sexual advances of a goth girl named Anisha Carpenter. In retaliation, she places a hex on him, saying that once a girl has been with him, "to the next, she will be true".

At present, Chuck is a successful dentist, running a practice in the office opposite his best friend Stu's plastic surgery business. While being sexually intimate with his girlfriend Carol, Chuck cannot reply that he loves her too, prompting her to immediately break up with him.

Stu and Chuck attend the wedding of one of Chuck's ex-girlfriends, Katie. During the reception, she toasts Chuck for being her lucky charm, which gains the interest of his female tablemates. He becomes enamored with Cam Wexler, an unusually clumsy, yet attractive and friendly penguin scientist working at a marine mammal park.

The next day, Chuck's office is full of women. He asks Stu if anything's different about him; they also find that Carol is engaged thanks to Chuck being a lucky charm. His date that evening wants to have sex with him because of the charm, but he gets an emergency call from Cam, who chipped her tooth in a work accident at the penguin exhibit.

Chuck fixes her tooth, but instead of accepting monetary payment, he asks her out for dinner, but Cam declines as she is not emotionally ready. He returns home to find his receptionist Reba coming onto him hoping he will be her lucky charm.

Stu encourages Chuck to indulge in more "guilt-free sex", and he does so. However, he still has feelings for Cam and asks her out. Their relationship deepens, but when Stu calls him and tells him that every single woman Chuck had slept with has gotten married, Chuck gets cold feet and leaves.

Stu and Chuck test the curse on the ugly, morbidly obese Eleanor. Observing that she is not seeing anyone, Chuck has sex with her and then makes Stu ask her out. Meanwhile, Chuck pretends to be sick, so maintains a distant relationship with Cam by phone and computer video. After Stu confirms he did it, yet Eleanor hasn't fallen for him, Chuck rushes to Cam's place and they have sex.

The next morning, when Chuck sees Eleanor on TV happily kissing another man, he angrily calls Stu, who admits he only pretended to ask her out. Worried that Cam will now find her true love, he smothers her in increasingly annoying ways, until she eventually dumps him.

While talking with Reba, Chuck sees a bottle spinning on the ground, which reminds him of the hex from his childhood. So, he and Stu locate Anisha's home. Chuck asks Anisha to remove the curse, but she insists that it is not truly real and that her love back then was just a childhood crush. Anisha encourages him to let go of the girl he is interested in if he truly loves her.

Chuck arranges for Cam to meet Howard Blaine, the penguin expert and author she admires. Later, Stu and his new three-breasted fiancée Lara tell him that Cam is heading to Antarctica with Howard. Chuck catches her on the plane and pleads with her not to go, but Cam explains that she will be back on Wednesday and is going with both Howard and his wife.

Chuck leaves Cam with a ring box with a pebble, a reference to a previous discussion about what penguins do to court a lifetime mate. She calls him back and they kiss. Meanwhile, Anisha pulls out her old childhood occult keepsake box, and removes a pin from the voodoo doll of Chuck. A year later, Chuck and Cam are in Antarctica together looking at the southern lights while surrounded by penguins.

During the end credits, Stu and Lara, who are house sitting for Chuck, discover a sex tape featuring Chuck, Cam, and a stuffed penguin. Although Lara turns it off due to its bizarre content, it fails to dampen their lust.

== Cast ==
- Dane Cook as Dr. Charlie "Chuck" Logan
  - Connor Price as Young Charlie
- Jessica Alba as Camilla "Cam" Wexler
- Dan Fogler as Dr. Stuart "Stu" Klaminsky
  - Troy Gentile as Young Stu
- Ellia English as Reba
- Sasha Pieterse as Young Anisha Carpenter (credited as Goth Girl)
  - Michelle Harrison as Anisha Carpenter
- Lonny Ross as Joe Wexler, Cam's stoner brother who works with her at the marine mammal park
- Chelan Simmons as Carol

== Production ==
Good Luck Chuck was filmed from late September to mid-November 2006. The film was shot in Vancouver, British Columbia, and also partly in Edmonton, Alberta, using the Alberta Film Studio for the aquarium scenes and the neighborhood of Old Strathcona for exterior shots.

== Soundtrack ==
The soundtrack was released on 18 September 2007.

1. "I Was Zapped by the Lucky Super Rainbow" (Flaming Lips)
2. "Accident Prone" (The Honorary Title)
3. "Good Luck Chuck" (The Dandy Warhols)
4. "Love It When You Call" – Cherrytree House Version (The Feeling)
5. "Good Weekend" (Art Brut)
6. "Hurry Up Let's Go" (Shout Out Louds)
7. "Shut Me Out" (Aidan Hawken) – 2:49
8. "You're Gonna Get It" (Sharon Jones & The Dap-Kings)
9. "The Whistle Song" (Pepper)
10. "You Might Think" (The Cars)
11. "Physical" (Olivia Newton-John)
12. "Bela Lugosi's Dead" (Bauhaus)
13. "Crazy in Love" (Antique Gold)

== Reception ==
Good Luck Chuck was widely panned by critics. According to Rotten Tomatoes, only 5% of critics gave the film positive reviews, based on 111 reviews. The site's consensus states: "A shortage of laughs and an undercurrent of mean-spiritedness undermine Good Luck Chuck, squandering a decent premise on gross-out humor and shopworn slapstick." On Metacritic, the film had an average score of 19 out of 100, based on 23 reviews, indicating "overwhelming dislike".

Roger Ebert awarded the film 1 out of 4 stars, branding it "potty-mouthed and brain-damaged", whilst his reviewing partner, Richard Roeper also rated it poorly.

British film critic Mark Kermode named it the worst film of 2007.

=== Box office ===
The film was the second-highest-grossing film at the U.S. box office in its opening weekend, grossing $13.6 million in 2,612 theaters. The film went on to have a total box office tally of approximately $35 million U.S. and $24 million foreign.

=== Accolades ===
The film earned two Razzie Award nominations including Worst Actress (Jessica Alba) and Worst Screen Couple (Alba and Dane Cook), but lost to Lindsay Lohan for I Know Who Killed Me.

Award	Category	Nominee	Result
Golden Raspberry Awards	Worst Actress	Jessica Alba	Nominated
Golden Raspberry Awards	Worst Screen Combo	Jessica Alba and Dane Cook	Nominated
