= Richard & Alice =

2013 video game

- Developer: Owl Cave
- Publisher: Owl Cave
- Designers: Lewis Denby; Ashton Raze
- Artists: Kyra Hills; Lewis Denby; Ashton Raze; Molly Carroll; Richard Warner
- Composers: Joe Gilder (Boneyard Audio); Yonatan Luria
- Engine: Adventure Game Studio
- Platform: Microsoft Windows
- Release: 21 February 2013
- Genre: Point-and-click adventure
- Mode: Single-player

Richard & Alice is an independent point-and-click adventure game developed and published by Owl Cave, it was created by Lewis Denby and Ashton Raze. The game was released digitally for Microsoft Windows via Desura, GOG.com and IndieCity on 21 February 2013.

== Plot ==
=== Overview ===
Richard & Alice tells the story of the two eponymous characters, who for much of the game are in an unusual prison which provides its inmates with leather sofas and televisions. The game is set in an unspecified future period in which unexpected weather systems have led to half the planet being covered with snow and ice, an event for which governments were not prepared. This led to the downfall of society.

Players alternate between the present day prison environment, where Richard is the playable character, and a series of flashbacks in which Alice is the playable character.

=== Synopsis ===
Having been used to being alone in his prison cell, Richard meets Alice when she moves into the cell opposite his at the beginning of the game. The pair begin talking, and learn a little about each other. Richard tells Alice that he used to be in the military, but was arrested for desertion. Alice, who is wry and sarcastic, tells Richard she is a murderer, though initially Richard is not sure whether to believe her. Alice's desire to see Richard's family photo leads to a discussion about the past, and Alice begins to tell Richard the story of how she ended up in jail.

In a flashback, it is revealed that Alice and her five-year-old son Barney were kidnapped by an old man. During the flashback they escape from the basement in which they were being held, and run off into the snow.

Back in the jail, Richard and Alice discuss the nature of the prison. By watching the television, the player is able to learn that the jail's eventually intended use is as a luxurious underground shelter for when the weather becomes even worse, and that its use as a prison is a trial run to assess its suitability. The jail is part of a wider plan known as the Typhon Project that will house the rich deep underground, away from the dangers outside. Richard and Alice continue to talk, and Alice confirms that she is indeed inside for murder. By exploring optional dialogue choices, the player can learn that Alice has a history of depression, and that she has been provided with medication by the prison guards. Alice continues to tell the story of how she ended up in jail.

In another flashback, Alice and Barney search for shelter, eventually coming across a seemingly abandoned house. They force their way inside, where they find food and clothes, a collapsed staircase, and recent signs of life. Alice finds a keepsake box containing a photo and keys. Opening a locked door with the keys, Alice finds a bathroom covered in dried blood. Elsewhere in the building Alice finds mysterious notes and scraps of information that seem to point to the house being used as a base for suspicious activity, as well as torn military papers belonging to someone named Malcolm York Mosely. Alice and Barney use the clothes they discover as bedding, board up the door, and settle in for the night.

Back in the present day jail scenario, Richard and Alice attempt to lower the temperature in their jail cell by fashioning an implement to adjust the Environmental Control Unit outside their cells. However, the pole snaps and the temperature gets lowered to below freezing. The pair attempt to rectify the situation by sending a support ticket to the prison guards. Alice continues to tell her story.

In a third flashback, Alice takes Barney to visit his father. The pair walk until they find a makeshift graveyard, and Alice and Barney take flowers to the grave. Both Alice and Barney talk to Barney's father, Mark, before leaving.

In the jail, Richard and Alice are becoming increasingly cold, and attempt to send another support ticket, but find the system to be down for maintenance. They discover a user manual that describes how to handle emergency situations by pressing a button hidden behind their bathroom cabinets. The pair both press the button, which beeps, but gives no other indication of help being on the way. Richard fears that he will be given harsher punishments due to the pair's actions, but Alice reassures him that he is unlikely to be punished more than he already has. Alice continues to tell her story.

In the next flashback, time has passed and Barney is unwell. Alice steps outside of the abandoned house, which the pair have settled into, and decides to try to get upstairs, beyond the broken staircase, in the hope that she will find medicine. It is implied that Alice believes Barney has pneumonia, though she reassures her son that it is just a head cold. Alice walks until she finds a church, in which she finds several helpful items. Eventually she finds a way into the upstairs of the house, where she finds numerous dead bodies, as well as a note suggesting they had been held captive in the house ahead of their deaths. Alice learns of medicine in a bunker beneath the church, where she travels with Barney. In the church Barney re-activates an old machine that reads through data related to the weather. Barney insists that Alice write the information down, which she does on the back of an old photograph she finds. Alice makes her way into the church bunker, where she finds another dead body whose identity is hinted at by a note found in the snow. While Alice is in the bunker, two men enter the church and begin speaking with Barney. One of the men becomes noticeably agitated and worries that Barney is the son of one of the Polar Bears, a notorious local gang. The other man asks Barney not to mention that they were there, and the men leave without harming Barney, much to Alice's relief. However, upon searching the bunker, Alice finds that the only medicine present is insulin.

In the present day, Alice and Richard are close to freezing to death in the jail, and decide on a radical escape plan by attempting to set fire to their cells. Richard manages to do so, and is lucky to avoid death when the cell doors take longer than expected to open. He begins to tell Alice he has not been truthful with her with the pair are able to escape and head to the nearest elevator, where Richard becomes excited by their escape, and asks Alice why she does not share his enthusiasm. Alice tells him he doesn't understand, before beginning to recite the final part of her story.

In a final flashback, Alice stands over Barney, who is now barely conscious. Alice believes he is about to die. Seeking comfort, she heads to the church to find a mysterious man in the confessional booth. She enters, and speaks with him, learning that the man used to be a meteorologist working from within the church bunker, and living at the abandoned house where Alice and Barney have been staying. The man is deeply religious, but does not mind Alice's atheism, and respects her convictions. The man advises Alice to go to her husband's grave and speak to him for answers, which Alice does. Speaking to his grave, Alice tells Mark that recently she has been considering suicide. When she receives no response, Alice becomes angry and frustrated. She walks back to the house and, out of desperation, shoots Barney to end his suffering.

Back in the present day, Richard tries to comfort Alice about the situation, but Alice assures him she is fine. The pair come to a foyer area where they find a guard hanged from the ceiling and a large pool of blood. The pair find a way past the security lasers but are left stumped by a code lock on the main door. Richard continues to tell Alice about his dishonesty, and reveals that, after deserting the army, he joined a group who were involved in smuggling operations with the prison. His group had radioed through door codes that would still work in the future due to a security loophole in the system. However, Richard says, he cannot remember any of the codes. Alice asks Richard for the family photo he showed her at the start of the game, and is confused when Alice looks at the back of the photo and tells him the door code. It is revealed that the numbers written down by Alice in the church correspond with one of the codes they can use to escape from the prison.

Outside, the pair talk. It is revealed that Richard was one of the men who spoke to Barney in the church, and that Richard's group had been trading humans with the Polar Bears in exchange for food, shelter, and access to government-controlled safe zones. Richard tries to claim that he thought he was doing the right thing, but Alice remains angry with him. The pair walk to the graveyard, where a new, smaller grave now sits next to Alice's husband's. Alice reveals that she in fact does not know where her husband was buried, nor who is in the grave in front of her. Alice walks towards Barney's grave and begins to talk to him, becoming emotional.

=== Endings ===
The game has five possible endings based on the player's actions throughout the game:

1. Alice digs into Barney's grave and pulls out a gun. Richard comments that he is surprised it was still there. Taking the gun with them, the pair walk to the church, where they settle in for the night. They talk about their experiences, and Alice reveals that, while she is angry with Richard for his past actions, she was grateful for his company while in the prison. Against Richard's wishes, Alice insists that he will provide her with food and resources, and then they will part ways. The game ends with Alice telling Richard that, "Sometimes, it seems like this is the way it always was. Like nothing's changed at all."
2. Alice digs into Barney's grave and pulls out a gun, which she points at Richard. Alice becomes increasingly aggressive while Richard tries to calm her down. The screen cuts to black and a gunshot is heard. When the screen fades back in, Alice is lying dead, having shot herself.
3. Alice digs into Barney's grave and pulls out a gun, which she points at Richard. Alice becomes increasingly aggressive while Richard tries to calm her down. The screen cuts to black and a gunshot is heard. When the screen fades back in, Richard is shot dead, and Alice is nowhere to be seen.
4. Alice digs into Barney's grave and pulls out a gun, which she points at Richard. Alice becomes increasingly aggressive while Richard tries to calm her down. Alice tells Richard she is not going to kill him, but insists he turns around. When he does, Alice knocks him unconscious. The screen cuts to black, and when it fades back in, Richard is locked in a shed. His family photo is sitting on a workbench. Richard picks it up to find Alice has written a note on it, apologising for her actions but saying "we do what we have to do" in order to survive.
5. Alice continues talking to Barney's grave, before the two walk off together. They walk to a sign marking Polar Bear territory. Alice and Richard wonder whether it is the right thing to do, but eventually decide their chances are better if they try to join up with the Polar Bears. The game ends as they begin their journey.

== Reception ==
Reception

Aggregate scores
Aggregator	Score
GameRankings	70.62%
Metacritic	71/100

Review scores
Publication	Score
Adventure Gamers	2.5/5
Destructoid	8/10
Edge	7/10

Richard & Alice received mixed to positive reviews from critics. It has an aggregate score of 70.62% on GameRankings and 71/100 on Metacritic.

Destructoid awarded the game 8 out of 10, saying "Uninspired puzzles and weak art might put some folk off, but they'd be missing out on a thoughtful, slow-burning tale that opens up into something poignant."

Meanwhile, Edge Magazine described the game as "quietly powerful" and commented on the success of Barney as a character in its 7 out of 10 review.

Rock, Paper, Shotgun criticized the game's art, but praised its storytelling and its handling of mature themes.

Adventure Gamers, however, awarded the game two-and-a-half stars out of five, stating: "Haters of happy endings—or happiness in general—are in luck, because Richard & Alice is a game so bleak and dreary that it's hard to find any other purpose for seeing it through to the bitter end."
