= The Avenging Angel =

1995 TV film

- Genre: Western
- Based on: Avenging Angel by Gary Stewart
- Written by: Dennis Nemec
- Directed by: Craig R. Baxley
- Starring: Tom Berenger; James Coburn; Fay Masterson; Kevin Tighe; Jeffrey Jones
- Music by: Gary Chang
- Country of origin: United States
- Original language: English

Production
- Executive producers: Moctesuma Esparza; Robert Katz
- Producers: Jay Benson; Tom Berenger
- Cinematography: Mark Irwin
- Editor: Mark Helfrich
- Running time: 91 minutes
- Production company: Esparza / Katz Productions

Original release
- Network: TNT
- Release: January 22, 1995

The Avenging Angel is a 1995 American Western television film directed by Craig R. Baxley and coproduced by and starring Tom Berenger, as well as James Coburn. The film premiered on TNT on January 22, 1995. The movie is based on a book of the same name by Gary Stewart, and features real life characters Brigham Young, Porter Rockwell, and Wild Bill Hickman. The fictional main character Miles Utley is an orphan raised to be a Danite (also known as an "avenging angel") bodyguard tasked with protecting the interests of top leaders in the Church of Jesus Christ of Latter-day Saints (LDS Church) in the newly colonized Utah Territory in the mid-late 1800s.

== Cast ==
- Tom Berenger – Miles Utley (main character)
- Charlton Heston – Brigham Young (LDS Church prophet and territory governor)
- James Coburn – Porter Rockwell
- Tom Bower – Wild Bill Hickman
- Fay Masterson – Miranda Young (Brigham Young's daughter)
- Daniel Quinn – Alpheus Young (Brigham Young's son)
- Kevin Tighe – Benjamin Rigby (fictional top leader in the LDS Church)
- Leslie Hope – Liza Rigby (one of Benjamin's polygamous wives)
- Jeffrey Jones – Milton Long (Brigham Young's head of security)
- Andrew Prine – Andrew Pike
- Lisa Banes - Rebecca Heaton - (sister of main character)
- Drew Snyder - Will Heaton - (brother-in-law of main character)
- Patrick Gorman – Jonathan Parker (first victim)
- Tracey Ellis - Hannah Parker (widow of Jonathan Parker)

== Production ==
Co-producer and main actor Berenger said the religious aspect of the story "is what I thought made it different than other Westerns. Otherwise, it would just be a Western. God knows, we have seen enough of those. I was kind of intrigued. And then Dennis Nemec did the script. It is a killer script—real economical and real right. He cut out a lot of the fat."

== See also ==
- Mormonism and violence
- Nauvoo Legion
- Blood atonement
- American Primeval
