= The Domestics =

- Promotional poster
- Directed by: Mike P. Nelson
- Written by: Mike P. Nelson
- Produced by: Shannon Gaulding; Gianni Nunnari
- Starring: Tyler Hoechlin; Kate Bosworth; Lance Reddick; Sonoya Mizuno; Dana Gourrier; Thomas Francis Murray; David Dastmalchian
- Cinematography: Maxime Alexandre
- Edited by: Julia Wong
- Music by: Nathan Barr
- Production company: Hollywood Gang Productions
- Distributed by: Orion Classics
- Release date: June 28, 2018 (United States)
- Running time: 95 minutes
- Country: United States
- Language: English
- Budget: $10.6 million
- Box office: $59,766

The Domestics is a 2018 American post-apocalyptic action horror film written and directed by Mike P. Nelson, in his directorial debut. The film stars Kate Bosworth and Tyler Hoechlin as a strained married couple trying to survive and travel home across a lawless American landscape controlled by violent gangs. Lance Reddick, Sonoya Mizuno, Dana Gourrier, Thomas Francis Murray, and David Dastmalchian also stars in supporting roles.

The Domestics was released on June 28, 2018, by Orion Classics. The film received positive reviews from critics and grossed $59,766 worldwide with a budget of $10.6 million.

== Plot ==
The US Government conducts a catastrophic chemical weapons attack on the American populace to "reset" society. The surviving population of America divides into two groups. The Gangs, who name themselves Gamblers, Sheets, Plowboys, Nailers, and Cherries, control territory. The Domestics are unaffiliated with the Gangs and wish to live in peace rather than give in to violence. The story is interspersed with snippets from a talk show by DJ Crazy Al, who provides updates and commentaries about America.

Married couple Mark and Nina West, whose divorce was put on hold because of society's breakdown, travel to Nina's parents in Milwaukee. They rest in an abandoned house along the way, catching the attention of some Nailers. Two break in, prompting Mark to kill them. Later, while scavenging for supplies at a store, they are met by Nathan Wood and his son Steven, who save them from a group of pursuing Nailers. Nathan invites Mark and Nina to his home to meet his family for a meal. They accept, and encounter members of the Plowboys along the way. During the meal, Nathan tells Mark about a rumored new gang consisting of children.

The conversation takes a turn for the worse when Nathan informs Mark that they had eaten human flesh. A Nailer from the prior home invasion, having survived and followed them, holds Nathan's daughter hostage and demands a trade for Mark and Nina. Steven ambushes the Nailer and chaos ensues. Nina and Mark flee, leaving Nathan's family behind, where the Nailer kills Nathan's wife and daughter. Nathan kills the Nailer but swears revenge on the Wests. He calls his Plowboy contacts on his CB Radio. As they drive away, Mark and Nina get into a heated argument before Nina is shot and passes out.

The couple reach an abandoned house, unwittingly followed by Betsy, a deserter Cherry who is fascinated by Nina. Betsy had earlier killed her way out of the Plowboys' captivity. After treating Nina's wound, Mark looks for supplies in another house. When Nina awakens, she removes her wedding ring and contemplates leaving before finding Mark's notes pleading her to give their relationship another chance. She then finds a box of records and a bottle of alcohol, puts on her favorite Heavy Metal record and begins dancing.

Mark encounters William Cunningham, a flamboyant madman. He discovers William has captured Nathan and Steven, who has caught up to them. William holds him at gunpoint and forces him to fight a large slave. While fighting, Mark is thrown into William, and takes the opportunity to kill him then free the slave. Nathan decides to forgive Mark and depart with Steven, ending his quest for vengeance.

Mark reunites with Nina at the house and the two rekindle their relationship. However, they are captured by Gamblers, brought to their clubhouse and forced to play Russian Roulette. After Mark is shot in the shoulder, Nina breaks free, grabs a gun and shoots the game's host. The two escape on a stolen car. They finally make it to her parents' house and learns from neighbors that her parents had died. After getting his wounds treated, Mark discovers Nina's father's prized Wildey Hunter pistol has been stolen.

Nina learns their neighbor Phil is in cahoots with Gamblers. Tipped off by Phil, the gang arrives at the neighborhood. A violent gun battle ensues, with Mark and Nina being supported by another neighbor as well as Betsy. The two Plowmen join the fight, killing their way to Betsy. In the end, the Plowmen and most of the Gamblers are killed. Betsy gives Mark the wedding ring Nina left at the abandoned house. She is fatally shot by the remaining Gambler, whom Nina shoots dead.

Entering Phil's house, Nina discovers his corpse, having died from stab wounds to the abdomen. His killer is revealed to be another neighbor's child, confirming the existence of the rumored children's gang. She also finds her father's Wildey.

Mark and Nina briefly rest at her parents', then pack up and leave. A radio broadcast by Crazy Al updates his listeners about a couple (referring to Mark and Nina) rumored to have eliminated Gamblers in Milwaukee. He conveys them as both a warning issued to other gangs and a sign of hope for change to the domestics.

== Cast ==
- Tyler Hoechlin as Mark West
- Kate Bosworth as Nina Monroe West
- Lance Reddick as Nathan Wood
- Sonoya Mizuno as Betsy
- Dana Gourrier as Wanda
- Jacinte Blankenship as Theresa Wood
- Thomas Francis Murphy as Plowboy Jim
- David Dastmalchian as Willy Cunningham
- Lee Perkins as Dean the Nailer
- Kaden Washington Lewis as Steven Wood
- Mikaela Kimani Armstrong as Bella Wood

== Production ==
On March 24, 2016, it was announced that Mike P. Nelson would direct The Domestics from his own script for Metro-Goldwyn-Mayer and Hollywood Gang Productions. Gianni Nunnari and Shannon Gaulding would produce it. On September 8, 2016, Kate Bosworth and Tyler Hoechlin were cast to star in it. The movie was filmed in Louisiana.

Stunt performer Deven MacNair filed an EEOC anti-discrimination lawsuit against producers of the film over an incident of "wigging", the practice of using a stunt performer who matched neither the sex nor race of the actor, which is against SAG-AFTRA rules.

== Release ==
In May 2018, Orion Classics acquired distribution rights to the film and set a release date of June 28, 2018.

== Reception ==
The film received favorable reviews from critics. On Rotten Tomatoes, the film has a 100% approval rating based on six reviews, with an average rating of 7.1/10. Robbie Collin of The Telegraph gave it a positive review and wrote: "It's all good grim fun, with a visceral kick."
