= Wrong Turn (2021 film) =

2021 horror film by Mike P. Nelson

- Theatrical release poster
- Directed by: Mike P. Nelson
- Written by: Alan B. McElroy
- Based on: Wrong Turn by Alan B. McElroy
- Produced by: James Harris; Robert Kulzer
- Starring: Charlotte Vega; Adain Bradley; Bill Sage; Emma Dumont; Dylan McTee; Daisy Head; Matthew Modine
- Cinematography: Nick Junkersfeld
- Edited by: Tom Elkins
- Music by: Stephen Lukach
- Production companies: Constantin Film; The H Collective; Tea Shop Productions
- Distributed by: Saban Films
- Release date: January 26, 2021
- Running time: 109 minutes
- Countries: United States; Germany; Canada
- Languages: English; Faroese
- Budget: $13 million
- Box office: $4.8 million

Wrong Turn (also known as Wrong Turn: The Foundation) is a 2021 folk horror film directed by Mike P. Nelson and written by franchise creator Alan McElroy. The film served as a second reboot and the seventh installment in the Wrong Turn film series, stars Charlotte Vega, Adain Bradley, Bill Sage, Emma Dumont, Dylan McTee, Daisy Head, and Matthew Modine. The film departed from the cannibalistic and incest-related themes of its predecessors. It is an international co-production between the United States, Germany, and Canada.

The project was announced in October 2018, with Nelson signed as director, from a screenplay written by McElroy, who wrote the original film. Principal photography began on September 9, 2019, and wrapped on November 2, 2019, in Felicity, Ohio.

Wrong Turn was theatrically released for one day, January 26, 2021, by Saban Films. The film received positive reviews from critics and grossed $4.8 million at the box office and $2.1 million in home sales.

== Plot ==
Jennifer "Jen" Shaw, her boyfriend Darius, and couples Adam and Milla and Gary and Luis, arrive in a small town in rural Virginia to hike the Appalachian Trail. They encounter hostility from locals in the bar, especially from Nate. Jen also meets a strange woman called Edith; with her is a young mute girl, Ruthie.

They begin their hike and, despite warnings, go off the trail to find an old fort. A huge tree trunk rolls down the hill and fatally crushes Gary. Bruised, disoriented and lost, the group sets up camp for the night. The following day, Milla goes missing, as well as their cellphones. They find a plaque dated "1859", commemorating the creation of a group of settlers in the mountains called the "Foundation", who believed the end of the United States was near.

While looking for Milla, Adam triggers a trap and is dragged into a pit. Jen, Darius and Luis come across a barn full of backpacks and clothing, then see Adam trussed to a pole, carried between two men wearing strange costumes and animal skull masks. The friends confront the men, who talk in a language they can't understand. Adam breaks free and manically beats one of them to death while the other escapes. Milla appears, having earlier gone for a bathroom break and evaded the two men. The friends encounter other traps and are surrounded by more masked men. Milla falls into a pit and is impaled on stakes. She is killed with an arrow by a member of the Foundation. Jen, Adam, Darius and Luis are all captured.

The group is taken to a primitive settlement deep in the forest, the headquarters of the Foundation, and put before a court. Edith is one of their captors. Morgan, the brother of the man Adam killed, testifies how Adam murdered his brother, Samuel. The group is charged with murder. The leader, Venable, sentences Adam to death. The others try to lie before the court to save his life, only to be exposed as perjurors by other witnesses, and are therefore sentenced to "darkness" for perjury in court. Adam breaks free and holds Ruthie hostage, demanding the release of his friends. Ruthie uses a concealed blade to stab Adam in the leg; he is then executed in front of his friends by Venable, who beats him to death using the log he used to kill Samuel.

Luis tries to flee and Venable blinds him with a hot poker. Jen tries to manipulate Venable and fellow Foundation members for mercy. She sells Darius to the group as a desirable professional who is able to solve social problems of their closed society; and offers herself to anyone as wife and mother to their children, advertising herself as having good genes and no genetic predispositions to cancer, of which she has found the Foundation people are afraid. Venable agrees, and she and Darius are initiated into the community. Jen becomes Venable's wife, as he discloses he has been widowed for over a year after his wife died in a mountain slope accident.

Six weeks later, Scott Shaw, Jen's father, arrives in the town to search for his daughter. He pays a local tracker to take him through the forest. After a trap kills the tracker and his son, Scott finds the settlement but is captured. Jen shoots her father with an arrow while Venable sentences Scott to "darkness" for trespassing and imprisons him. That night, Jen releases her father, revealing she only shot him so as not to raise suspicion. She tries to get Darius to run away with her and Scott, but he refuses to leave. Ruthie helps them escape before Venable and the other cultists pursue them. They discover an underground chamber full of blinded and shambling prisoners, including Luis. Jen mercy kills him and flees with Scott, killing several cultists, including Edith. They encounter Nate and other armed townsmen who offer to help. The cultists attack them, wounding Jen, but Scott and Jen escape.

Several months later, Jen and her father have returned to their normal lives. Jen visits her stepmother, but finds her in the process of welcoming Venable and Ruthie to the neighborhood. Jen confronts Venable, who notices that she is pregnant with his child. He asks Jen to return with him to the Foundation. Jen agrees on the condition that Venable never again interfere with her family. She, Venable, and Ruthie leave, driving away in a recreational vehicle (RV).

As the end credits roll, Jen causes the RV to crash into a parked car. Jen stabs Venable to death and kills the other cultist, the RV driver as well. She then takes Ruthie's hand as they walk back towards her family home.

== Cast ==
- Charlotte Vega as Jennifer "Jen" Shaw
- Adain Bradley as Darius Clemons
- Bill Sage as Venable / Ram Skull
- Emma Dumont as Milla D'Angelo
- Dylan McTee as Adam Lucas
- Daisy Head as Edith
- Matthew Modine as Scott Shaw
- Vardaan Arora as Gary Amaan
- Adrian Favela as Luis Ortiz
- Tim de Zarn as Nate Roades
- Rhyan Elizabeth Hanavan as Ruthie
- Chaney Morrow as Hobbs
- Damian Maffei as Morgan / Deer Skull
- Mark Mench as Standard / Wolf Skull
- David Hutchison as Cullen / Boar Skull
- Chris Hahn as Samuel / Elk Skull
- Valerie Jane Parker as Corrine
- Daniel R. Hill as Reggie

== Production ==
=== Development ===
In October 2018, a reboot of the Wrong Turn film series was announced. The film was directed by Mike P. Nelson and written by Alan B. McElroy, who wrote the original film in 2003. In May 2019, it was announced that Charlotte Vega would star in the film.

In an interview with director Nelson for Fangoria, he stated:

"I was fully prepared on the first read to be thrust into a crazy slasher world of cannibals eating human flesh and splitting people down the middle. When that didn't happen, I was pleasantly surprised. There was something else at the core of the story that got me."

=== Filming ===
Principal photography began on September 9, 2019, in Ohio and wrapped on November 2.

== Music ==
The film was composed by Stephen Lukach. The soundtrack album, which was titled Wrong Turn: The Foundation, and was released by Konigskinder Music on February 25, 2021. Actress and singer Ruby Modine performs the film's end title track of Woody Guthrie's "This Land Is Your Land", which was released as a single on March 11, 2021.

== Release ==
=== Theatrical ===
Wrong Turn was originally scheduled for release in 2020, but was pushed to 2021 due to the COVID-19 pandemic. On December 16, 2020, it was announced that the film would premiere in American theaters for one night only on January 26, 2021.

=== Home media ===
The film was released on Blu-ray, digital and DVD on February 23, 2021, by Lionsgate Home Entertainment.

== Reception ==
=== Critical response ===
On Review aggregator Rotten Tomatoes, the site gave the film a 64% approval rating based on 64 reviews. The site's consensus reads, "Wrong Turn is a cut below more effective horror outings, but viewers in the mood for some gory chills will find that this franchise reboot does more than a few things right". On Metacritic, it assigned the film a weighted average score of 46 out of 100 based on seven critics who gave the film "mixed or average reviews".

Nick Allen of RogerEbert.com gave the film three out of four stars, writing that "McElroy and Nelson evolve Wrong Turn into a bizarre, winding odyssey, albeit with a lot more on its mind than just a cool kill."

The film ranks on Rotten Tomatoes' Best Horror Movies of 2021.

== Future ==
On May 30, 2023, Alan B. McElroy revealed that the film was intended to be the first installment in a trilogy and expressed hope that it would be followed by the sequels.
