= Mark Helfrich (film editor) =

American film editor and director

- Born: United States
- Occupations: Film editor, film director

Mark Helfrich is an American film editor and director. He is known for his work on action films, and with director Brett Ratner.

== Life and career ==
A graduate of the University of Wisconsin–Madison, he began his career at New World Pictures as an assistant editor. His first film as editor was the Cannon Films production Revenge of the Ninja (1983).

Helfrich has edited over thirty films such as Stone Cold (1991), Showgirls (1995) with Mark Goldblatt. Helfrich is also the primary editor for director Brett Ratner's films, such as Money Talks (1997), Rush Hour (1998), The Family Man (2000), Rush Hour 2 (2001), Red Dragon (2002), and After the Sunset (2004), X-Men: The Last Stand (2006) with Mark Goldblatt and Julia Wong, Rush Hour 3 (2007) with Dean Zimmerman and Don Zimmerman, Tower Heist (2011), and Hercules (2014) with Wong. Helfrich directed Good Luck Chuck.

He has also edited, with Brett Ratner's direction, a version of the Hollywood film production titled Kites:The Remix a.k.a. Kites (2010), as well as the pilot episode for Prison Break, an American-based TV drama series produced by Brett Ratner. Helfrich edited Brett Ratner's music video Beautiful Stranger featuring Madonna.

He is an elected member of American Cinema Editors (ACE) and serves on the board as an associate director. He is also a member of the Academy of Motion Picture Arts and Sciences.

== Filmography ==
=== Film ===
==== Editor ====
Year	Title	Director	Notes	Ref.
1979	Rock 'n' Roll High School	Allan Arkush	Assistant editor	
1979	The Lady in Red	Lewis Teague	Assistant editor	
1982	The Last American Virgin	Boaz Davidson	Assistant editor	
1983	Revenge of the Ninja	Sam Firstenberg		
1984	Breakin'	Joel Silberg	Supervising editor	
1984	Baby Love	Dan Wolman		
1984	Ninja III: The Domination	Sam Firstenberg	Additional editor	
1985	Rambo: First Blood Part II	George P. Cosmatos	with Mark Goldblatt	
1985	The Return of the Living Dead	Dan O'Bannon	Additional editor	
1986	Jumpin' Jack Flash	Penny Marshall	Additional editor	
1987	Predator	John McTiernan	with John F. Link	
1988	Action Jackson	Craig R. Baxley		
1988	License to Drive	Greg Beeman	Additional editor	
1990	I Come in Peace	Craig R. Baxley		
1991	Rich Girl	Joel Bender	with Richard Candib	
1991	Stone Cold	Craig R. Baxley		
1991	The Last Boy Scout	Tony Scott	with Stuart Baird and Mark Goldblatt	
1993	Nowhere to Run	Robert Harmon	with Zach Staenberg	
1993	Midnight Kiss	Joel Bender	with Bender	
1993	Striking Distance	Rowdy Herrington	with Pasquale Buba	
1995	Showgirls	Paul Verhoeven	with Mark Goldblatt	
1995	Money Train	Joseph Ruben	Uncredited	
1996	The Juror	Brian Gibson	Uncredited	
1997	Money Talks	Brett Ratner		
1997	Most Wanted	David Glenn Hogan	with Michael J. Duthie	
1998	Rush Hour	Brett Ratner		
2000	Scary Movie	Keenen Ivory Wayans		
2000	The Family Man	Brett Ratner		
2001	Rush Hour 2	Brett Ratner		
2002	Red Dragon	Brett Ratner		
2003	Honey	Bille Woodruff	with Emma E. Hickox	
2003	Shanghai Knights	David Dobkin	Additional editor	
2004	After the Sunset	Brett Ratner		
2006	X-Men: The Last Stand	Brett Ratner	with Mark Goldblatt and Julia Wong	
2007	Rush Hour 3	Brett Ratner	with Dean Zimmerman and Don Zimmerman	
2008	Four Christmases	Seth Gordon	with Melissa Kent	
2008	New York, I Love You	Brett Ratner	Segment: "5"	
2010	Kites: The Remix	Anurag Basu	Re-edited version of Kites	
2011	Season of the Witch	Dominic Sena	with Dan Zimmerman and Bob Ducsay; Also second unit director	
2011	Tower Heist	Brett Ratner		
2013	Movie 43	Brett Ratner	Segment: "Happy Birthday"	
2013	R.I.P.D.	Robert Schwentke		
2014	Hercules	Brett Ratner	with Julia Wong	
2016	Nina	Cynthia Mort		
2017	Jumanji: Welcome to the Jungle	Jake Kasdan	with Steve Edwards	
2019	Jumanji: The Next Level	Jake Kasdan	with Steve Edwards and Tara Timpone	
2024	Red One	Jake Kasdan	with Steve Edwards and Tara Timpone	
2024	Harold and the Purple Crayon	Carlos Saldanha	with Tia Nolan	
2026	Jumanji: Open World	Jake Kasdan		

Director

Year	Title	Notes	Ref.
2007	Good Luck Chuck	Directorial Debut	

2nd unit director

Year	Title	Notes	Ref.
1986	Critters		
2009	The Final Destination		
2011	Season of the Witch	Also editor	

=== Television ===
Editor

Year	Title	Notes	Ref.
1987	Max Headroom	2 episodes	
1990	Parker Kane	TV movie	
1992	Tales from the Crypt	Episode: "Split Personality"	
1994	Rebel Highway	3 episodes	
1994	Shake, Rattle and Rock!	TV movie	
1995	The Avenging Angel	TV movie	
2005	Prison Break	Episode: "Pilot"	
2011	CHAOS	Episode: "Pilot"	

Director

Year	Title	Notes
2008	Prison Break	Episode: "Just Business"
2010	Bones	Episode: "The Shallow in the Deep"

== Awards and nominations ==
Award	Year	Category	Work	Result
American Cinema Editors Award	2006	Best Edited Drama Series	Prison Break ("Pilot")	Nominated
CableACE Award	1995	Editing a Dramatic Special or Series/Movie or Miniseries	The Avenging Angel	Nominated
Satellite Award	2006	Best Editing	X-Men: The Last Stand	Won
