= Alan B. McElroy =

American screenwriter

- Born: Cleveland, Ohio, U.S.
- Occupation: Screenwriter
- Years active: 1988–present
- Organization: Writers Guild of America
- Known for: Halloween 4: The Return of Michael Myers; Spawn; Todd McFarlane's Spawn; Wrong Turn
- Spouse: Kymm McElroy
- Children: 3

Alan B. McElroy is an American writer of film, television, comic books, and video games. He is best known for his collaborations with Todd McFarlane on the Spawn franchise, and for penning horror films such as Halloween 4: The Return of Michael Myers and Wrong Turn.

== Life and career ==
McElroy's screenwriting debut was Halloween 4: The Return of Michael Myers, the fourth entry in the long-running horror franchise. Due to an impending strike by the Writers Guild of America (of which McElroy is a member), McElroy was forced to develop a concept, pitch the story, and send in the final draft in under eleven days. McElroy has mostly written action (Rapid Fire, The Marine, Tekken) and horror films (Wrong Turn, Wheels of Terror, Three). He is also a long-time collaborator of Todd McFarlane and has frequently worked to different capacities on the Spawn franchise, having written the Curse of the Spawn comic series, the 1997 motion picture, and was the co-creator and showrunner of the critically acclaimed animated adaptation. His 2003 film Wrong Turn spawned a franchise, with an additional 5 films being produced, albeit without McElroy's involvement.

== Personal life ==
McElroy is a native of Cleveland, Ohio, but has resided in Los Angeles since the early nineties. His wife is an artist and homemaker, and he has two daughters and one son (Matthew). McElroy is a Christian, and two of his films (Three, Left Behind: The Movie) are adaptations of religious source material.

== Filmography ==
Film writer

- Halloween 4: The Return of Michael Myers (1988)
- Rapid Fire (1992)
- Spawn (1997)
- Left Behind: The Movie (2000)
- Ballistic: Ecks vs. Sever (2002)
- Wrong Turn (2003)
- The Marine (2006)
- Three (2006)
- Tekken (2009)
- The Marine 4: Moving Target (2015)
- The Perfect Guy (2015) (Story only)
- The Condemned 2 (2015)
- Fractured (2019)
- Wrong Turn (2021) (Also executive producer)
- Strung (2026)
- Beware Boiúna (2026)

Television

Year	Title	Writer	Producer	Notes
1990	21 Jump Street	Yes	No	Episode "Blackout"
1990	Wheels of Terror	Yes	No	TV movie
1997–1999	Todd McFarlane's Spawn	Yes	No	Showrunner, co–executive producer
2016–2017	The Vampire Diaries	Yes	No	Executive story editor 8 episodes
2017	The Night Shift	Yes	Co-producer	10 episodes
2018	Sacred Lies	Yes	Yes	10 episodes
2019–2024	Star Trek: Discovery	Yes	Yes	8 episodes
2025–	Star Trek: Strange New Worlds	Yes	Yes	3 episodes

Video game

- Ground Zero: Texas (1993)

Acting credits

Year	Title	Role
2006	The Marine	Johnny
2010	Tekken	Tekken Arena Attendant
