= X-Men: The Last Stand =

2006 film by Brett Ratner

- Theatrical release poster
- Directed by: Brett Ratner
- Written by: Simon Kinberg; Zak Penn
- Based on: X-Men by: Stan Lee; Jack Kirby
- Produced by: Lauren Shuler Donner; Ralph Winter; Avi Arad
- Starring: Hugh Jackman; Halle Berry; Ian McKellen; Famke Janssen; Anna Paquin; Kelsey Grammer; James Marsden; Rebecca Romijn; Shawn Ashmore; Aaron Stanford; Vinnie Jones; Patrick Stewart
- Cinematography: Dante Spinotti
- Edited by: Mark Helfrich; Mark Goldblatt; Julia Wong
- Music by: John Powell
- Production companies: 20th Century Fox; Marvel Entertainment; The Donners' Company; Dune Entertainment; Ingenious Film Partners
- Distributed by: 20th Century Fox
- Release dates: May 24, 2006 (Cannes); May 26, 2006 (United States)
- Running time: 104 minutes
- Countries: United States; United Kingdom
- Language: English
- Budget: $210 million
- Box office: $460 million

X-Men: The Last Stand (also marketed as X3: The Last Stand, or X-Men 3) is a 2006 superhero film based on the Marvel Comics superhero team the X-Men. It is the sequel to X2 (2003), the third installment in the X-Men film series, and the final film in the original X-Men trilogy. Directed by Brett Ratner and written by Simon Kinberg and Zak Penn, the film features an ensemble cast including Hugh Jackman, Halle Berry, Ian McKellen, Famke Janssen, Anna Paquin, Kelsey Grammer, James Marsden, Rebecca Romijn, Shawn Ashmore, Aaron Stanford, Vinnie Jones, and Patrick Stewart. It is based on two X-Men comic book story arcs, "Gifted" and "The Dark Phoenix Saga", with a plot that revolves around a "mutant cure" that causes serious repercussions among mutants and humans, and on the resurrection of Jean Grey who unleashes a dark force.

Bryan Singer, who had directed the two previous films, X-Men and X2, decided to leave the sequel to work on Superman Returns (2006). X2 composer and editor John Ottman and X2 writers Dan Harris and Michael Dougherty also left to work on Superman Returns, as did James Marsden, who had very limited screen time in The Last Stand before his character was killed off due to his departure from the film. Singer had not even defined the storyline for a third film. Matthew Vaughn, who co-wrote the script (though uncredited) and was initially hired as the new director, left due to personal and professional issues, and was replaced by Ratner. Filming took place from August 2005 to January 2006 with a budget of $210 million, and was consequently the most expensive film ever made at the time of its release. It had extensive visual effects created by 11 different companies.

X-Men: The Last Stand premiered on May 24, 2006, in the Out of Competition section at the 2006 Cannes Film Festival, and was released theatrically in the United States on May 26 by 20th Century Fox. It grossed approximately $460 million worldwide, becoming the seventh-highest-grossing film of 2006; it was at the time the highest-grossing film in the series and after 2018 stood as the fourth-highest-grossing film of the franchise. It received mixed reviews from critics and was deemed inferior to its predecessors though the performances, the visual effects, and the action sequences were praised. A spin-off, The Wolverine, was released in 2013, while a direct sequel, X-Men: Days of Future Past, was released in 2014.

== Plot ==
In the past, Charles Xavier and Magneto meet young Jean Grey at her parents' house to invite her to join their school, the Xavier School for Gifted Youngsters. Industrialist Warren Worthington II discovers his son is a mutant, as the latter tries to cut off his wings.

In the present, Worthington Labs announces an inoculation to suppress the X-gene that gives mutants their abilities and offers the "cure" to any mutant who wants it. The cure interests some mutants, such as Rogue, who cannot touch anyone without harming them, while others are wary of it. Magneto re-establishes his Brotherhood of Mutants (Note: As depicted in X-Men (2000)) with those who oppose the cure, warning it will be weaponized to exterminate the mutant race. With help from Pyro, Callisto, and several other mutants, Magneto attacks a mobile prison. He frees Mystique, Multiple Man, and Juggernaut. Mystique shields Magneto from a cure dart and loses her mutant abilities, so he abandons her.

Cyclops, still distraught over the loss of Jean, (Note: As depicted in X2 (2003)) drives to her resting location at Alkali Lake. Jean suddenly appears to Cyclops, but kills him as they kiss. Sensing trouble, Xavier sends Logan and Storm to investigate. When they arrive, they find only telekinetically floating rocks, Cyclops' glasses, and an unconscious Jean.

At the X-Mansion, Xavier explains that when Jean sacrificed herself to save them, she also freed the "Phoenix", a dark alternate personality with godlike destructive potential which Xavier had telepathically repressed. Logan is disgusted to learn of this psychic tampering with Jean's mind, but once she awakens, he discovers that she killed Cyclops and is not the woman he once knew. The Phoenix emerges, knocks out Logan, destroys Scott's glasses and escapes to her childhood home. Learning of Jean's return, Magneto and the Brotherhood arrive at the house simultaneously as the X-Men, with Magneto and Xavier both vying for Jean's loyalty until the Phoenix resurfaces. She destroys the house and disintegrates Xavier, then leaves with Magneto.

A depowered Mystique gives up Magneto's base in the woods to the FBI, who raid it. However, the detected human heat signatures in the camp are Multiple Man and his copies. Magneto and the Brotherhood attack Alcatraz to kill a young mutant named Jimmy, whose genome is used to create the cure. They overwhelm the military troops until the remaining X-Men arrive to confront them. During the fight, Kitty Pryde saves Jimmy from Juggernaut, Iceman subdues Pyro, and Logan distracts Magneto for Hank McCoy to inject him with the cure, nullifying his powers. The Phoenix awakens and begins destroying anyone within range of her powers. Logan realizes that only he can stop the Phoenix due to his healing factor and adamantium skeleton. When Logan approaches her, Jean momentarily gains control and begs him to save her. Heartbroken, Logan fatally stabs Jean, and she dies in his arms.

Sometime later, mutant rights are finally obtained, and Xavier's school still operates with Storm as headmistress. The President of the United States appoints McCoy as ambassador to the United Nations. Rogue, having taken the cure, rekindles her relationship with Iceman. Meanwhile, Magneto sits at a chessboard in San Francisco, seemingly human and weak, and as he gestures toward a metal chess piece, it wobbles slightly.

As a “post credits scene,” Dr. Moira MacTaggert checks in on the comatose patient shown in an earlier scene. (Note: In the DVD commentary, it is revealed that the patient was "P. Xavier", Charles Xavier's brain-dead twin brother, whose character was written for the scene. Earlier in the film, MacTaggert spoke in a video about the ways of using mutant powers, such as transferring the mind of a dying man into the body of a patient with no higher brain function, giving an explanation for his resurrection.) She is startled when he greets her with Xavier's voice.

== Cast ==
- Hugh Jackman as Logan / Wolverine:
  A Canadian mutant born with hyper-acute, animal-like senses, claws on his hands, and an accelerated healing factor that made it possible to implant a coating of the indestructible metal alloy adamantium on his skeleton. Jackman was pleased to see that the script allowed Wolverine to expand his character choices, as, instead of questioning whether he would remain a loner or join the X-Men, Logan is now asked if he will play a leadership role in the X-Men.
- Halle Berry as Ororo Munroe / Storm:
  A mutant, who is one of Xavier's earlier students and the leader of the X-Men in Cyclops' absence. Storm is a woman with the ability to manipulate the weather. Berry had stated during interviews for X2 that she would not return unless the character had a significant presence comparable to the comic book version, leading to a larger role in The Last Stand's script. Berry declared that her ethnicity made the actress identify with the cure plot: "When I was a child, I felt that if only I could change myself, my life would be better. As I've gotten older, I've come to terms with what utter nonsense that is." The character was given a more modern haircut, and costume designer Judianna Makovsky opted to give Storm more black clothes, a color she only wore in the leather costume for previous films, to make her "tougher and sexier".
- Ian McKellen as Erik Lehnsherr / Magneto:
  Leader and founder of the Brotherhood, Magneto is a mutant Holocaust survivor who wages war against humanity in the name of mutant superiority. He can control and manipulate metal, making him one of the most powerful mutants. Well known for his homosexuality, McKellen found a parallel of the cure with many prejudices: "It's abhorrent to me, as it would be if a person said I need curing of my sexuality, or if someone said that black people could take a pill that would 'cure' them of being black." McKellen's shooting schedule had to accommodate his work in both The Da Vinci Code (2006) and the London theater, going as far as filming the actor in England to later superimpose into the Vancouver plates.
- Famke Janssen as Jean Grey / Phoenix:
  A mutant former member of the X-Men, a Class 5 mutant who possesses potentially limitless telepathic and telekinetic powers. The X-Men learn that she has survived the flooding dam from the previous film, but when the rest of the team finds her, Grey has given in completely to the aggressive alternate personality of her powers, the Phoenix. Her mutant powers rival those of Xavier. The writers described the multiple personalities as "an Oedipal drama played out", where the Phoenix was "someone embodying [a] Greek goddess", while Jean Grey kept the character as "a human, grounded in Freudian terms, a victim, a schizophrenic. To mark the change of Jean Grey into Phoenix, her wardrobe focused on red colors, and everyday fabric in contrast to the leather costumes of the X-Men. Digital make-up also made Jean's face darker, with her skin showing some veins and her eyes turning black, signifying the Phoenix personality of her powers. Haley Ramm plays a young Jean Grey.
- Anna Paquin as Anna Marie / Rogue:
  A young mutant woman whose power causes her to temporarily take on the powers of anyone she touches, leaving her victims (mutant or human) unconscious; Rogue's lack of control over her power causes a great deal of strain on her relationship with Iceman. Paquin declared that while Rogue did not have "a large physical component in this movie", the "adult decisions" the character was forced to make allowed for more intensity on the emotional side.
- Kelsey Grammer as Dr. Henry "Hank" McCoy / Beast:
  A mutant former student of Xavier's School who is now a member of the U.S. Cabinet as the Secretary of Mutant Affairs, Beast is a brilliant scientist and statesman. He is covered in blue fur and has heightened strength, reflexes, and agility, as well as pointed fangs and a lion-like roar. Grammer's make-up took three hours to apply. It involved applying latex prosthetics before painting his eye area and lips blue, applying various hair pieces and wigs, and a muscle suit covered with a hand-punched fur suit.
- James Marsden as Scott Summers / Cyclops:
  A mutant, who is X-Men's field leader, Cyclops emits powerful energy blasts from his eyes, and must wear specially made glasses to prevent the destruction of anything he looks at. Although he is in a committed relationship with Jean Grey, her Phoenix persona kills him early in the film. The decision to kill the character off early was due to a scheduling conflict that Marsden had with Superman Returns. Marsden saw no problem in having a smaller role, as the films opted to feature Wolverine as the standpoint character, and felt that "it's difficult when you have however many new characters that you're trying to introduce to an audience in 90 to 120 minutes, to give everyone their due."
- Rebecca Romijn as Raven Darkholme / Mystique:
  A blue-skinned mutant who possesses the ability to shape-shift to mimic anyone's appearance, as well as fight with incredible agility, reflexes, and strength. She is also a woman of few words. She jumps in front of the cure darts intended for Magneto and, after she loses her mutant abilities as a result, Magneto abandons her. Romijn described this story as "a traumatic experience" for Mystique, given that the previous movies implied that she and Magneto had "a deep-seated bond", and becoming "a frail mortal would be her worst nightmare".
- Shawn Ashmore as Bobby Drake / Iceman:
  A young mutant, Iceman can create constructs of ice or blasts of cold. Ashmore's commitments to X-Men made him decline Bryan Singer's invitation to play Jimmy Olsen in Superman Returns. The actor was content with his bigger role after Bobby joined the X-Men main team in X2, as during the previous production he wondered "When do I get to freeze something or get into a fight?"
- Aaron Stanford as John Allerdyce / Pyro:
  A mutant who was a student of Xavier's School with a grudge against his former friend Bobby Drake, Pyro can manipulate fire, generated through wrist-mounted lighters. Stanford stated that with the Brotherhood, Pyro "is allowed to fully explore his power" for lacking moral restraints. The actor was comfortable with returning to the role, particularly for following The Hills Have Eyes (2006), which had an exhausting shoot in the Moroccan desert, while Pyro was nowhere near as physically demanding – "My character's pretty much stand-and-deliver, stand there and throw fire at people. There's no acrobatics."
- Vinnie Jones as Cain Marko / Juggernaut:
  A mutant criminal recruited by the Brotherhood in a prison truck, Juggernaut is incredibly strong, fast, and, once he gains momentum, he is nearly unstoppable. The film's version of Juggernaut is depicted as a mutant, and his relation to Charles Xavier was never mentioned. Matthew Vaughn cast Jones, whom he met while producing the Guy Ritchie gangster movies, where Jones began his acting career. The actor had to go through a four-hour make-up process to portray Juggernaut, which included a muscle suit and a prosthetic chin. The costume tried to retain the bullet-shaped helmet of the comics without going excessively over the top.
- Patrick Stewart as Professor Charles Xavier:
  A mutant with uncharted telepathic powers, and founder of Xavier's School for Gifted Youngsters. Xavier is an authority on genetic mutation and an advocate of peaceful relations between humans and the mutant kind. Stewart signed to the film without knowing Xavier would die, and not meeting original director Matthew Vaughn – both would meet in Manchester, where Stewart was filming Eleventh Hour (2006), but eventually Brett Ratner called to introduce himself as the new director.
- Elliot Page (Note: Credited as Ellen Page.) as Kitty Pryde: A mutant with the ability to phase through matter and walk through solid objects, her clear affection for Iceman further adds to the tension already present between Iceman and Rogue. Maggie Grace and Summer Glau were considered for the role, before Ratner invited Page, who impressed the director with his performance in Hard Candy (2005). Page initially declined, not wanting to yet jump to Hollywood filmmaking, but accepted after reading the script. Page said part of his motivation was having a new experience: "I thought, well, when else am I going to have a chance to wear a leather suit and run through exploding things? Why not be a superhero for a change?"
- Daniel Cudmore as Peter Rasputin / Colossus: A mutant with the ability to transform his body into an organic steel, while also granting him superhuman strength and a resistance to physical damage while in that form. Cudmore wore a foam latex muscle suit covered with a chrome-plated plastic, plus a hard plastic head to have the metal skin on the set, with some digital augmentation being used to enhance the facial expressions. A digital double was used only for stunts that could not be achieved practically, such as the Fastball Special, where Colossus throws Wolverine at Magneto.
- Ben Foster as Warren Worthington III / Angel: The mutant son of an industrialist, who has feathered wings which allow him to fly. The static wings were models with a 15 feet (4.6 m) wingspan and 5 feet (1.5 m) height glued to Foster's back, replaced with computer-generated ones when movement was required. Mike Vogel turned down the role of Angel in favor of Poseidon (2006).
  - Cayden Boyd appears as young Angel
- Michael Murphy as Warren Worthington II: The head of Worthington Labs, the corporation developing the "cure", Worthington expects to rid his son of his mutant abilities. The addition of the character allowed Angel to integrate into the cure plot, which also added a parallel between Warren's discovery of his son's mutation with a father finding out about his son's homosexuality.
- Dania Ramirez as Callisto: The leader of the Omegas, Callisto is a mutant with enhanced superhumanly acute senses, who senses mutants and their powers, and possesses superhuman speed and is an expert hand-to-hand combatant. The character combined the powers of the comics' Callisto with another of the Morlocks, Caliban, and was written as someone who could be "beautiful, but with a tough persona". Ramirez had originally auditioned to play the mutant prostitute Stacy X, and impressed Brett Ratner so much that he decided to bring her in to play Callisto.
- Shohreh Aghdashloo as Dr. Kavita Rao: A scientist who works at Worthington Labs on the mutant cure; she is killed by Kid Omega. Aghdashloo signed without a completed script, and erroneously said her character would be mutant doctor Cecilia Reyes.

Josef Sommer appears as the President. The President of the United States is tolerant of mutants, but fearful of the Brotherhood's threats. While creating the role, the producers felt that a "different" president, like an African American or a woman, had become a cliché in itself and went for a traditional route with an elder Caucasian man. Sommer was invited by Ratner following their collaboration in The Family Man (2000). Bill Duke appears as Trask, the head of the Department of Homeland Security, Trask aids the president of the United States during the war against the mutants. The character is probably related to the comic books' Bolivar Trask; however, his first name is never mentioned in the film, and he is portrayed as African American. In the comics, Bolivar Trask is the head of Trask Industries and creator of the mutant-hunting Sentinels. Eric Dane appears as Multiple Man, a mutant and thief recruited by the Brotherhood in a prison truck, Madrox can create a very large number of copies of himself. The writers considered Dane's performance memorable despite his being featured in only two scenes. Madrox's wardrobe invoked the symbols worn in his comics costume.

Other actors who portrayed mutants are: Meiling Melançon as Psylocke, a mutant with the ability to teleport herself through areas of shadow, although that depiction differs significantly from the comics (writer Zak Penn said the character was not referred to as Psylocke in the script, but wound up getting the name on the credits); Omahyra Mota as Arclight, a mutant who can generate shock waves of concussive force; Ken Leung as Kid Omega, a mutant with the ability to eject spikes from his body, most notably his face (though the character resembles the comic books' Quill and was later confirmed as such, though the official cast credits erroneously read "Kid Omega"); and Cameron Bright as Jimmy / Leech, a mutant who can neutralize the powers of nearby mutants. Various characters were included at the suggestion of editor Mark Helfrich, who brought Marvel's X-Men Encyclopedia to director Brett Ratner, searching for mutants who could make an appearance. These include Phat, a mutant that is a very large man who can slim down to fit in a smaller space (played by two actors, Via Saleaumua – "large mode" – and Richard Yee – "small mode"); Spike (played by Lance Gibson), a mutant who battles Wolverine in the forest by extruding bony spikes from his flesh – the character was added because the editing team felt that the original cut of the scene portrayed Logan as a cold-blooded killer, which could be changed if another mutant attacked Wolverine before he struck the Brotherhood – and Glob Herman (played by Clayton Dean Watmough), a mutant with transparent skin. Helfrich himself portrays an unnamed mutant with ash-gray skin.

Various other mutants make cameos at the X-Mansion; Shauna Kain and Kea Wong reprised their cameo roles as Siryn and Jubilee respectively, and three identical girls in the background in one scene are a reference to the Stepford Cuckoos. Olivia Williams portrays Moira MacTaggert. Adrian Hough, who previously voiced Nightcrawler in X-Men: The Animated Series (1992–1997) appears as John Grey, Jean's father. X-Men co-creator Stan Lee and writer Chris Claremont have cameos in the film's opening scene as the neighbors of young Jean Grey. The sergeant directing defensive preparations before the Brotherhood assaults Alcatraz Island is played by R. Lee Ermey. Lloyd Adams portrays the green-skinned mutant who climbs the guard tower on Alcatraz. Many fans believed this was Toad; however, the credits list him as Lizard Man. Avalanche and Vanisher also appear; however, it is not known who portrayed them.

== Production ==
=== Development ===
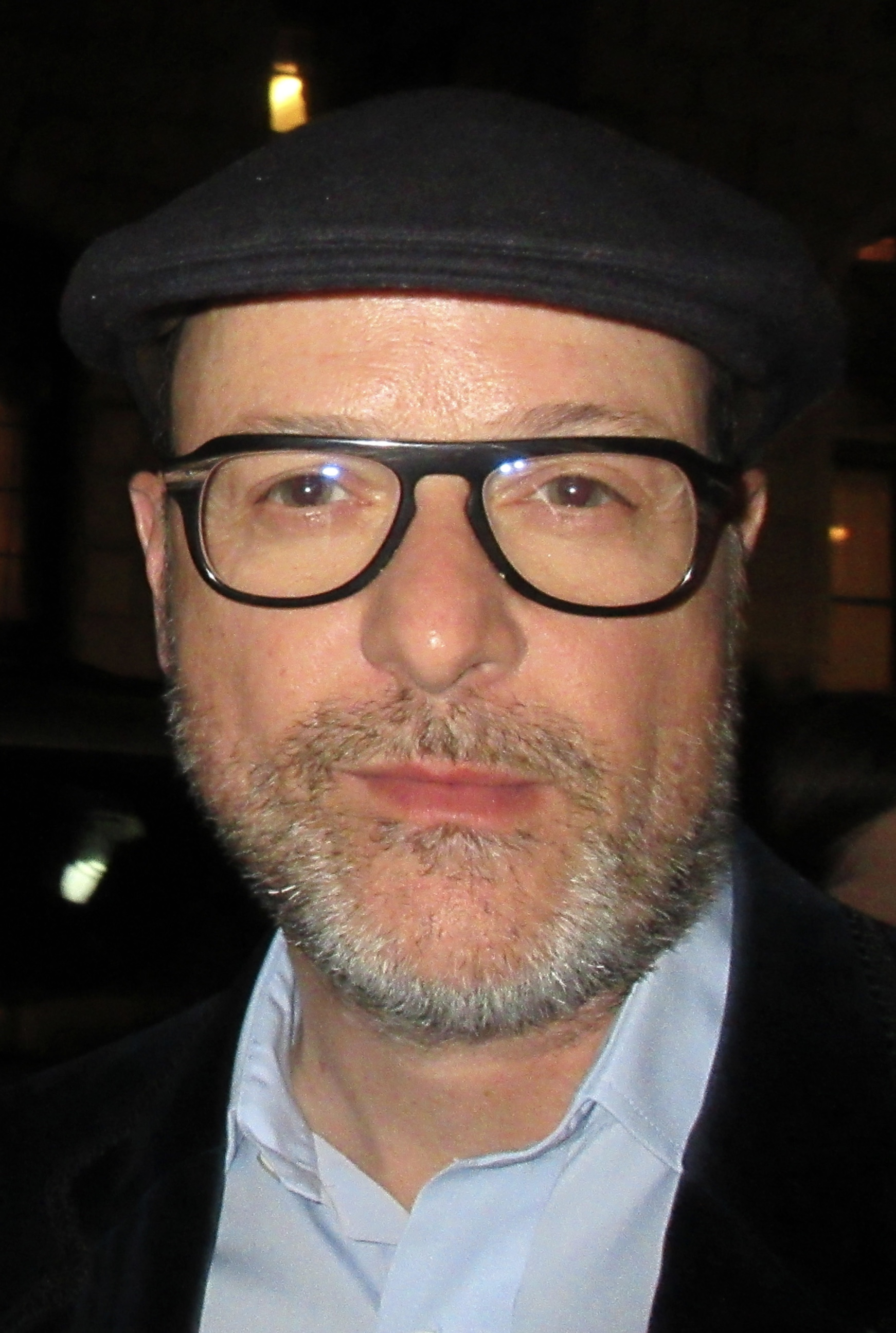
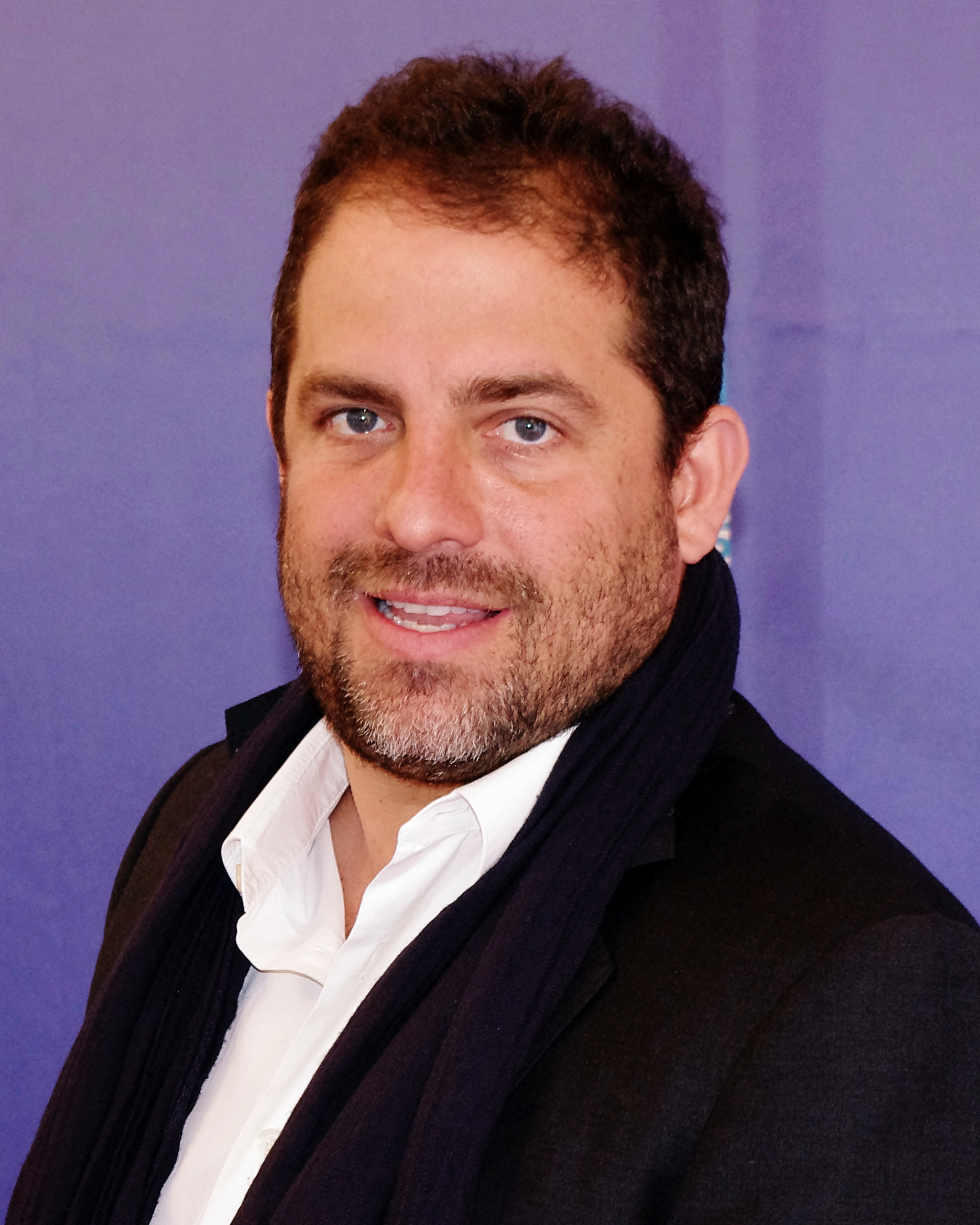
Matthew Vaughn (left), who would later direct X-Men: First Class, was Fox's first choice to replace Bryan Singer. Once he left, Brett Ratner (right) took over directing The Last Stand.

Bryan Singer, the director of the first two 20th Century Fox X-Men films, left the project in July 2004 in favor of developing Superman Returns (2006) for Warner Bros. Pictures. Singer stated that he "didn't fully have X-Men 3 in my mind" in contrast to a fully formed idea for a Superman film and interest in joining that franchise. By the time of his departure, Singer had only produced a partial story treatment with X2 (2003) screenwriters Dan Harris and Michael Dougherty, who accompanied him to Superman Returns. The treatment focused on Jean Grey's resurrection, which would also introduce the villainess Emma Frost, a role intended for Sigourney Weaver. Frost was an empath manipulating Jean's emotions in the treatment and, like the finished film, Magneto desires to control her. Overwhelmed by her powers, Jean kills herself, but Jean's spirit survives and becomes a god-like creature, which Dougherty compared to the star child in 2001: A Space Odyssey (1968).

New contracts for returning cast members were made, as the actors and actresses had signed for only two films. Hugh Jackman's contract included the approval of director, initially offering the position to Darren Aronofsky, with whom he had just finished filming on The Fountain (2006). Joss Whedon, whose comic book storyline "Gifted" from Astonishing X-Men which he wrote was integrated into the script's plot, turned down the offer because he was working on a Wonder Woman film. Rob Bowman and Alex Proyas were also rumored to be up for consideration, though Proyas personally turned it down, citing feuds with Fox president Thomas Rothman while producing I, Robot (2004). Zack Snyder was also approached, but he was already committed to 300 (2007). Peter Berg was also considered to direct the film, but he too turned down the job. Guillermo del Toro was also offered to direct the film but turned down as he was already committed to Pan's Labyrinth (2006). In February 2005, with still no director hired, Fox announced a May 5, 2006, release date, with filming to start in July 2005 in Vancouver. One month later, the studio, signed Matthew Vaughn to direct, and pushed the release date three weeks to May 26, Memorial Day weekend. Vaughn cast Kelsey Grammer as Beast, Dania Ramirez as Callisto, and Vinnie Jones as Juggernaut, but family issues led him to withdraw before filming began. Vaughn was also cautious of the tight deadlines imposed by Fox, stating that he "didn't have the time to make the movie that I wanted to make". In October 2023, Vaughn stated that he left the project after a group of executives had tried to sign Halle Berry on with a fake script, which included scenes of Storm rescuing kids from Africa. Channing Tatum was vied for the role of Gambit before the character was written out of the film.

Brett Ratner, who was previously considered to direct X-Men (2000) in 1996, and John Moore were both in the running to replace Vaughn during pre-production. On June 5, 2005, Ratner was confirmed as Vaughn's replacement. Ratner said he was surprised to get an invitation, as he thought he would have no chance to do a comic-book film after the canceled Superman: Flyby for Warner Bros. With a limited knowledge of the X-Men mythos, Ratner trusted his writers on doing something faithful to the comics, having the script drawing all of its scenes from the original Marvel publications.

=== Writing ===
Simon Kinberg, who had worked on two other Fox-produced Marvel Comics film adaptations, Fantastic Four and Elektra (both 2005), was hired as writer for X-Men 3 in August 2004. X2 co-writer Zak Penn was separately working on his own draft, and the two joined forces for a combined screenplay in January 2005. Kinberg wanted the comic book arc "The Dark Phoenix Saga" from The Uncanny X-Men by writer Chris Claremont and artist John Byrne to be the emotional plot of the film, while "Gifted" by Whedon and artist John Cassaday would serve as the political focus. The duo had seven months to complete The Last Stand's script, and during the first week of work completed the first eighty pages, consisting of the first two-thirds of the plot. This incomplete draft was leaked to Ain't It Cool News, who proceeded to write a negative review. Vaughn later revised all of the major sequences in the film, but he did not receive a writer's credit.

The writers had to fight Fox's executives to retain the Phoenix plot, as the studio only wanted the cure story, as it provided a reason for Magneto's conflict with the X-Men. Still, the disputes prevented them from adding much for Jean Grey to do in most of the film's second half, as the executives considered the tone of the Phoenix story too dark for a mainstream summer movie, and that its appeal would be limited to hardcore fans rather than a general audience. Penn defended the divergences from the original Dark Phoenix stories, stating that the Phoenix was not a firebird-shaped cosmic force "because it doesn't fit into the world," and that Cyclops did not have as much screentime as Wolverine because the latter was more popular and "with Cyclops, you can't see his eyes. It's a harder character to relate to for the audience." Killing Cyclops was Fox's decision, based on the availability of actor James Marsden, who was cast in Singer's Superman Returns. The studio considered killing him off-screen with a dialogue reference, but Kinberg and Penn insisted that Jean kill him, emphasizing their relationship. Xavier's death was intended to match the impact of Spock's demise in Star Trek II: The Wrath of Khan (1982), as Fox felt the script called for a dramatic turning point. Kinberg and Penn were originally cautious, but grew to like the idea of killing off Xavier. They decided to write a post-credits scene suggesting the character's return for a sequel.

As the studio was simultaneously developing X-Men Origins: Wolverine (2009), limitations were set on which mutants could be used for cameo appearances in X-Men 3 in an attempt to avoid risking character development for Wolverine. Gambit was considered for both the convoy scene being freed by Magneto and the Battle of Alcatraz along with the X-Men, but the writers did not want to introduce a fan favorite character and "not be able to do him justice." Kinberg reasoned, "there just wasn't enough space", and considered Gambit would only work with as much screentime as Beast. Alan Cumming had been uncomfortable with the long hours he had to take with the prosthetic makeup as Nightcrawler in X2, but still planned to return for the sequel. The part of Nightcrawler was so minimal, that the studio felt it was not worthwhile to go through the long and costly makeup process, so the character was cut. Kinberg felt that "there wasn't much left to do with the character. It also felt like he might tread a little bit on the terrain of Beast, in terms of similarities in the characters and their political standpoints in terms of dealing with their mutancy". Nightcrawler's absence was later explained in the tie-in video game. The introductory scenes tried to emulate the Auschwitz opener for the first film, going with different scenes that resonated later in the plot instead of an action scene like in most blockbusters. Afterwards came a scene in the Danger Room, which was considered for the previous X-Men films but never included for budget and writing concerns. The writers tried to make the simulation not feel extraneous by showcasing some of the character conflicts and abilities in a "Days of Future Past"-inspired battle with a Sentinel. Another repurposed scene was Magneto attacking the convoy to free Mystique, Madrox, and Juggernaut, which Penn had previously envisioned for X2.

Ratner collaborated with Penn and Kinberg in rearranging the plot structure of the film. Originally, the Golden Gate Bridge sequence was in the middle of the film, where the moved bridge was used by Magneto to free mutants being held prisoners on Alcatraz, and the climax was set in Washington, D.C. Ratner felt too many recent action films, such as Planet of the Apes (2001) and X2 itself, had their ending in Washington, and the Golden Gate sequence "would be the biggest sequence in my entire career", and suggested to instead put the Worthington laboratory in Alcatraz, along with "creating a face for the cure", which became the character of Jimmy/Leech. Kinberg agreed, as he previously argued with Penn about "blowing so many things early in the movie".

=== Filming ===
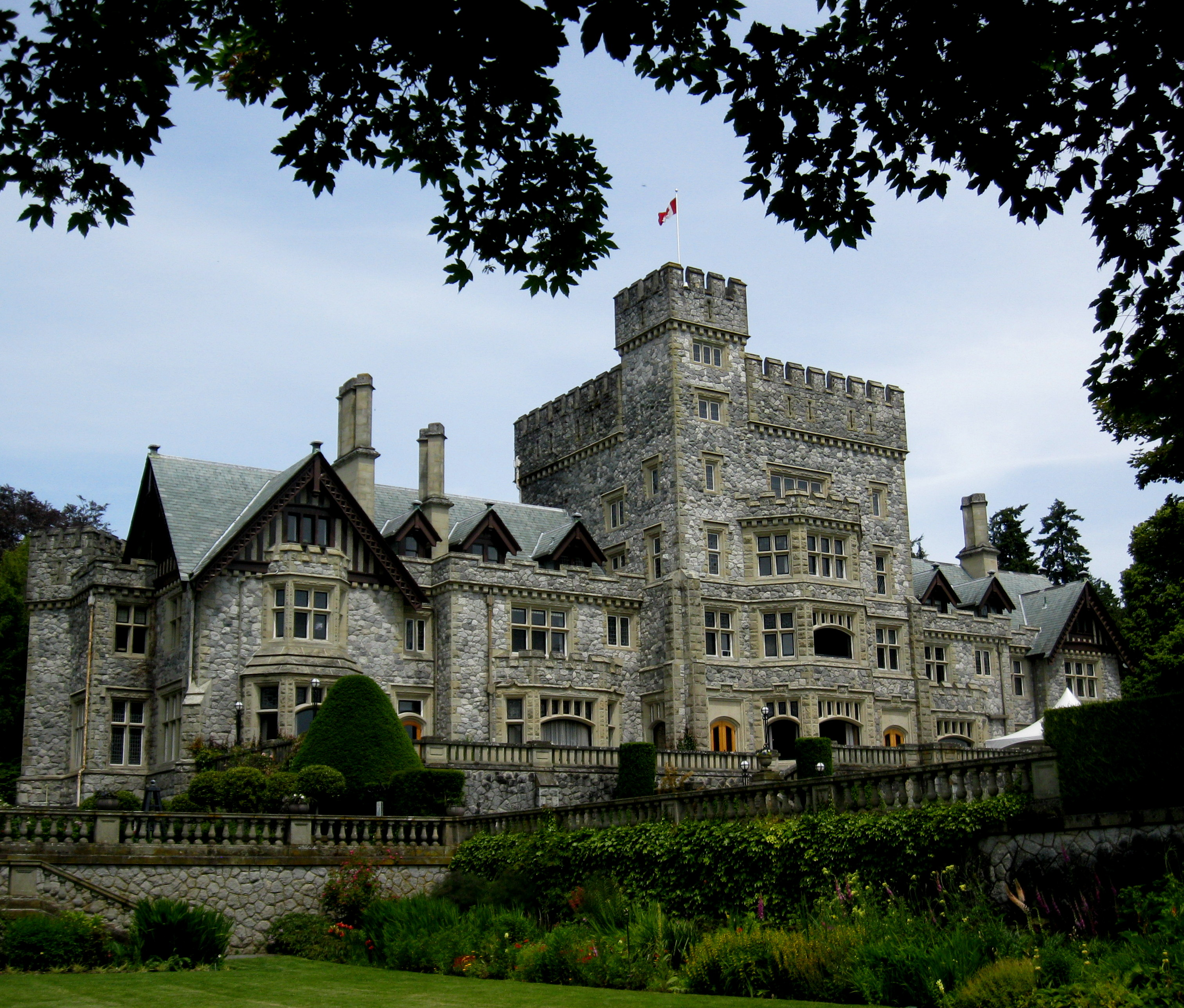
Hatley Castle

X-Men: The Last Stand began shooting in August 2005 and wrapped in January 2006. Much of the film was shot at Vancouver Film Studios, the same location of X2. Locations included the Hatley Park National Historic Site and Royal Roads University, which doubled for the X-Mansion. An old lumber mill next to the Fraser River doubled as Alcatraz Island. The tight schedule made Ratner "begin post-production the day I started shooting," sending the scenes he had just filmed to his editors. The editing team was led by Mark Helfrich, who had edited all of Ratner's films, assisted by Mark Goldblatt in the action scenes and Julia Wong with effects-heavy footage.

According to associate producer Dave Gordon, "This is the biggest production ever filmed in Canada. It used to be X2, now it's X3." The $210 million budget also made The Last Stand the most expensive film to be made at the time. The film's record would be first broken by Pirates of the Caribbean: Dead Man's Chest (2006)'s $225 million budget. The original cinematographer was Philippe Rousselot, who eventually opted to depart the production. Dante Spinotti, a frequent collaborator of Ratner, replaced him, with the assistance of J. Michael Muro. Fox Filmed Entertainment co-chairmen Thomas Rothman and Jim Gianopulos debated whether Rogue should give Iceman a passionate kiss at the film's end or simply hold his hand. The two executives screened The Last Stand for their daughters, as well as the studio's female marketing executives, and the hand-holding prevailed. Gianopulos stated that the kissing "was all about sex, and we didn't want that." A strong campaign of secrecy about the script was enforced by Ratner and the writers. Even the actors had problems with getting full screenplays, the call sheets did not reveal all the characters, and many scenes were shot in varied ways. Both of the ending scenes were not included on the shooting script, with Ratner taking a small crew during one day's lunch time to film the post-credits scene with Xavier, and later going to London to film Magneto in the park.

In 2014, Kinberg said of the wobbling chess piece at the end of the film, "There is a scene before the credits where Magneto's playing chess, and you see that he can just make the chess piece move, so there's a hint that he's starting to regain his powers. The leap from there was that cure from The Last Stand didn't work exactly the way they thought it would, and so we just leaped forward however many years, and he's got his powers back."

In 2017, according to co-star Elliot Page in an interview during the MeToo and Time's Up movement, he accused Ratner of homophobia, saying he outed Page as a lesbian at a cast and crew meet and greet during production, which made him feel violated. Fellow co-star and bisexual actress Anna Paquin expressed support for Page, stating that she was present when Ratner commented.

=== Visual effects ===
To make sure the visual effects were made in just one year and without exceeding the budget, visual effects supervisor John Bruno shipped the 900 visual effects shots to eleven companies in four countries – the United States, New Zealand, the United Kingdom, and Canada – and did extensive previsualization. Their work begun in April 2005, before the director Brett Ratner had even been announced, and Bruno made sure to emphasize practical effects, "shoot as many practical elements as possible, and only use CGI when we had to." For instance, complex wirework rigs were employed which enabled the actors to do some stunts without resorting to digital doubles, including a computer controlled flying rig from Cirque Du Soleil for Angel's flight, and one for Halle Berry's flying spins.

Bruno estimates one-sixth of the effects budget was spent on the Golden Gate Bridge scene, which employed both a miniature of the bridge and computer graphics. The miniature was filmed over a period of two months in Santa Clarita, California, just outside of Los Angeles. The effects team would shoot one minute of footage outdoors each day at "golden hour," complete with explosives, to have enough plates to composite the scene. The visual effects team had to work without reference footage due to the city of San Francisco vetting any filming on the actual bridge, including aerial shooting, as the area has restrictions on flying helicopters. Framestore CFC had further challenges in matching the varied weather conditions across the film's plates. As compositing supervisor Matt Twyford detailed, "the elements consisted of cold, rainy night live-action footage from Vancouver, sunny day miniature elements, traditional misty day background plates of San Francisco, and of course the CGI bridge and CGI elements." Another miniature was for the Grey home, which had a destructible equivalent matching the Canadian location and also had a digital equivalent. A notable effect was the "digital skin-grafting", which rejuvenated the faces of senior actors Patrick Stewart and Ian McKellen, made by the Brothers Strause's Lola Visual Effects. Bruno made sure to ask the atomization made by Phoenix was not too vivid and gruesome, instead resembling oatmeal.

== Music ==
Ratner, a fan of John Powell's work in The Bourne Identity (2002), invited Powell to write the music for The Last Stand. Powell was unsure if the Bourne work was "the kind of score that would fit the film," and Fox became reluctant on the composer's availability, given he was already scoring Ice Age: The Meltdown (2006) at the time of Ratner's contact. However, Powell finished the Ice Age score early to accept the job even if it resulted in a tighter schedule. Powell included references to the score from the previous two films as "it all had to be in the same family, and the same language". The Phoenix theme used lyrics from Benjamin Britten's Requiem Mass for the choir parts. A soundtrack album was released on May 23, 2006.

== Release ==
=== Marketing ===
The marketing for X-Men: The Last Stand was darker and more ambiguous compared to the two predecessors. Rothman declared that the decision was made so the film would "be different from all of the other movies in the summer," with a campaign that "wanted people to stop and not have it be so immediately apparent that we're selling a movie. We're interested in selling an emotion and an idea." The film's official website was launched in October 2005. The teaser trailer release with King Kong that December was done in conjunction with the studio releasing the film's first official screen shots of the film to USA Today. Diamond Select Toys created a toy line, scanning the actors from the film with likenesses for the first time in the trilogy. Additional product tie-ins came with Harley-Davidson and 7-Eleven. A seven-minute sneak peek aired on Fox Broadcasting two weeks before the film's theatrical release.

Del Rey Books published a novelization of the film, written by comic book writer Chris Claremont, while Newmarket Press published The Art of X-Men: The Last Stand: From Concept to Feature Film. Claremont also worked on Activision's tie-in video game, X-Men: The Official Game, doing the script along with screenwriter Zak Penn. The game's story bridges the events between X2 and X-Men: The Last Stand, featuring Wolverine, Iceman and Nightcrawler as playable characters, voiced by their film portrayers Hugh Jackman, Shawn Ashmore, and Alan Cumming. Patrick Stewart also appears as Professor X. The game was released to negative reviews and eventually underperformed commercially.

=== Theatrical ===
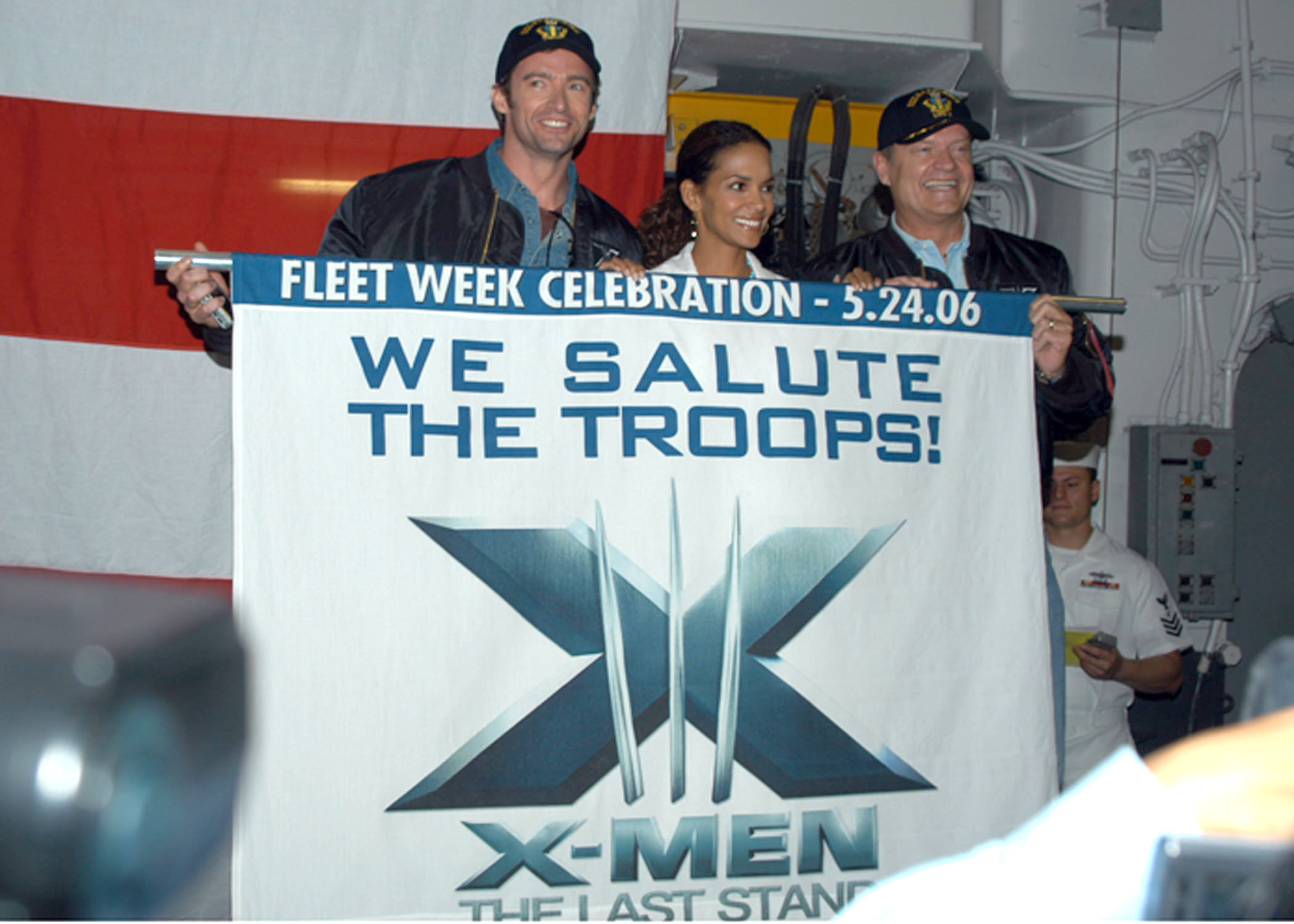
Hugh Jackman, Halle Berry and Kelsey Grammer at the USS Kearsarge (LHD-3) for an advance screening

X-Men: The Last Stand premiered at an out-of-competition event of the 2006 Cannes Film Festival on May 22, 2006. Two days later, Hugh Jackman, Halle Berry and Kelsey Grammer attended an advance screening at USS Kearsarge (LHD-3), as the ship was en route to New York City for Fleet Week. The film was released in the United States on May 26, 2006, in 3,690 theaters, while also opening in 95 international markets that same weekend.

=== Home media ===
X-Men: The Last Stand was released on October 3, 2006, on DVD and UMD by 20th Century Fox Home Entertainment. It was available in three editions: single-disc, two-disc, and a trilogy box set with the previous two films. Extras included three alternative endings, each with optional commentary by director Ratner; 10 deleted scenes; audio commentaries from Ratner, the writers, and the producers; and two hidden Easter eggs. The two-disc edition came with a 100-page commemorative comic book with a new story written by X-Men co-creator Stan Lee, his first original Marvel comic book in five years. The DVD sold 2.6 million units in its first day, exceeding Fox's expectations, and sold a total of 5 million in its first week. A Blu-ray edition was issued in November 2006.

X-Men: The Last Stand is included in the 4K Ultra HD Blu-ray set X-Men: 3-Film Collection, which was released on September 25, 2018.

== Reception ==
=== Box office ===
X-Men: The Last Stand earned $45.1 million on its opening day and went on to generate $102.7 million during its three-day opening weekend, making it the fourth-highest opening weekend of all time, behind Shrek 2, Star Wars: Episode III – Revenge of the Sith and Spider-Man. The film then grossed $122.8 million during the four-day Memorial Day weekend, which was the highest at that time, surpassing The Lost World: Jurassic Park and Shrek 2. It would hold this record until it was surpassed by Pirates of the Caribbean: At World's End the next year. The film's release was also a new single-day record for Friday openings. The opening weekend gross was surpassed six weeks later by Pirates of the Caribbean: Dead Man's Chest, making The Last Stand's opening the second-highest of 2006. Internationally, The Last Stand topped the box office in 26 countries with a total gross of $76.1 million overall, but suffered competition from The Da Vinci Code, which retained the top spot in most markets, and beat The Last Stand in international gross that weekend with $91 million. The film's second weekend dropped 67 percent to $34 million, which was the steepest post-Memorial Day opening drop on record. X-Men: The Last Stand eventually grossed $234.4 million in the domestic box office and $225 million internationally, for a worldwide total of $460 million, the fourth-highest in domestic grosses and seventh-highest worldwide for 2006. X-Men: The Last Stand was also the highest-grossing film in the franchise, until it was surpassed by X-Men: Days of Future Past eight years later.

=== Critical response ===
On the review aggregator website Rotten Tomatoes, 56% of 237 critics' reviews are positive, with an average rating of 5.9/10. The website's consensus reads: "X-Men: The Last Stand provides plenty of mutant action for fans of the franchise, even if it does so at the expense of its predecessors' deeper moments." Metacritic, which uses a weighted average, assigned the film a score of 58 out of 100, based on 38 critics, indicating "mixed or average" reviews. Audiences polled by CinemaScore gave the film an average grade of "A−" on an A+ to F scale.

Ebert and Roeper gave the film a "two thumbs up" rating, with Roger Ebert saying, "I liked the action, I liked the absurdity, I liked the incongruous use and misuse of mutant powers, and I especially liked the way it introduces all of those political issues and lets them fight it out with the special effects." Stephanie Zacharek of Salon.com gave it a mixed review, noting that it was "only half a mess", and that Ratner "could have stuck a bit more closely to the 'Dark Phoenix' narrative than he did." However, Zacharek did note that that third act captured some of the original story's "majesty", praising the performances of Jackman, McKellen, Romijn and Janssen. Famke Janssen's performance was praised by critics. Matt Mueller of Total Film was impressed with Janssen's performance and said, "Playing the super-freaky mind-control goddess like GoldenEye's Xenia Onatopp's all-powerful psycho sister, her scenes – particularly that one with the house – crackle with energy and tragedy. If only the rest of X3 had followed suit."

Justin Chang of Variety said the film was "a wham-bam sequel noticeably lacking in the pop gravitas, moody atmospherics, and emotional weight that made the first two Marvel comicbook adaptations so rousingly successful." Lisa Schwarzbaum of Entertainment Weekly called it a "diminished sequel, a brute-force enterprise" and said it was an example of "what happens when movies are confused with sandwich shops as franchise opportunities". The Minneapolis Star Tribune characterized Ratner's approach as "Forget subtlety! Let's blow things up!" David Edelstein of New York magazine called it "just another big-budget B-movie. It's a fast and enjoyable B-movie, though." Peter Travers of Rolling Stone said, "Last stand? My ass. Billed as the climax of a trilogy, the third and weakest chapter in the X-Men series is a blatant attempt to prove there is still life in the franchise. And there is: just enough to pull a Star Trek and spawn a Next Generation saga."

X-Men: The Last Stand has been criticized by fans for killing off major characters such as Charles Xavier, Cyclops, and Jean Grey. The 2014 film X-Men: Days of Future Past has subsequently been viewed by some critics as a revision of those controversial plot elements in X-Men: The Last Stand.

=== Other responses ===
Writer Kinberg stated, "There are a lot of things about 'X3' that I love and there are a lot of things that I regret," detailing that he would have preferred the Dark Phoenix as the main plotline and "I would have fought harder" for that considering that at the time, "the darkness of her story was a little bit daunting on a huge $200 million studio movie", leading Fox to ask for rewrites. Having admitted to being unhappy with the way some elements of the film turned out, Kinberg then went on to direct and write the reboot film Dark Phoenix, which retold the events of X-Men: The Last Stand.

Previous X-Men director Bryan Singer declared that The Last Stand "isn't what I would have done" and he was dissatisfied with the busy plot and excessive character deaths, but Singer still liked some parts of the movie, such as Elliot Page's casting – leading Singer to bring Page back as Kitty Pryde in X-Men: Days of Future Past – and the scenes with Leech, which he described as "really sweet moments".

Matthew Vaughn, who was attached as director before dropping out, said that given the limited time they had to make it, the film was "pretty good" but criticized Ratner's direction: "I could have done something with far more emotion and heart. I'm probably going to be told off for saying that, but I genuinely believe it." While promoting his own installment of the franchise, 2011's X-Men: First Class, Vaughn would say regarding The Last Stand that "I storyboarded the whole bloody film, did the script. My X3 would have been 40 minutes longer. They didn't let the emotions and the drama play in that film. It became wall-to-wall noise and drama. I would have let it breathe and given far more dramatic elements to it."

=== Accolades ===
Awards and nominations for X-Men: The Last Stand
Award	Category	Nominee(s)	Result
Costume Designers Guild Awards	Excellence in Fantasy Film	Judianna Makovsky	Nominated
Empire Awards	Best Sci-Fi / Fantasy	X-Men: The Last Stand	Nominated
Empire Awards	Scene of the Year	The Phoenix and Professor X showdown	Nominated
Irish Film & Television Award	Best International Actor	Ian McKellen	Nominated
People's Choice Award	Favorite Female Action Star	Halle Berry	Won
People's Choice Award	Favorite Movie Drama	X-Men: The Last Stand	Nominated
People's Choice Award	Favorite Movie	X-Men: The Last Stand	Nominated
Satellite Award	Best Editing	Mark Helfrich, Mark Goldblatt, Julia Wong	Won
Saturn Award	Best Costume	Judianna Makovsky	Nominated
Saturn Award	Best Music	John Powell	Nominated
Saturn Award	Best Science Fiction Film	X-Men: The Last Stand	Nominated
Saturn Award	Best Special Effects	John Bruno, Eric Saindon, Craig Lyn	Nominated
Saturn Award	Best Supporting Actor	Kelsey Grammer	Nominated
Saturn Award	Best Supporting Actress	Famke Janssen	Won
Teen Choice Award	Choice Action Movie	X-Men: The Last Stand	Nominated
Teen Choice Award	Choice Action Movie Actor	Hugh Jackman	Nominated
Teen Choice Award	Choice Action Movie Actress	Halle Berry	Nominated
Teen Choice Award	Choice Movie Liplock	Hugh Jackman & Famke Janssen	Nominated
Teen Choice Award	Choice Movie Rumble	X-Men: The Last Stand	Nominated
Teen Choice Award	Choice Movie Villain	Ian McKellen	Nominated
Young Artist Awards	Best Supporting Young Actor in a Feature Film	Cameron Bright	Nominated

== Franchise ==
=== Spin-off series and prequel series ===
In February 2006, Ratner said that X-Men: The Last Stand could be the final X-Men film: "We wanted to make sure the audiences knew that this was a trilogy. Even though they weren't made together like Lord of the Rings (2001–2003), this is really closure for the X-Men series. ... This is the last stand for sure."

The next two X-Men films, X-Men Origins: Wolverine (2009) and X-Men: First Class (2011) were prequels that took place before the events of the first X-Men movie. The first film set chronologically after X-Men: The Last Stand was The Wolverine (2013), a standalone sequel that depicts Logan heading for Japan to escape the memories of what occurred during X-Men: The Last Stand. Jackman and Janssen reprised their roles, while McKellen and Stewart appear in a mid-credits scene.

X-Men: Days of Future Past, the direct sequel to X-Men: The Last Stand, was released on May 23, 2014, with Jackman, Berry, Stewart, McKellen, Paquin, Page, Ashmore, Cudmore, Grammer, Janssen, and Marsden reprising their respective roles. The plot, inspired by the comic book "Days of Future Past" story arc, begins with a dystopian future set years after X-Men: The Last Stand. Wolverine's consciousness is sent back in time to his 1973 body in order to guide the younger Xavier and Magneto into preventing the events that lead to the desolate future. The events of the film end up retroactively changing the continuity of the series, changing some events in films set after X-Men: First Class, resulting in an altered timeline where Jean and Cyclops are still alive.

Hugh Jackman reprised his role as Logan / Wolverine in X-Men: Apocalypse in a cameo as Weapon X, and starred as the lead in Logan. The latter film left the fate of the X-Men in dire straits.

=== Marvel Cinematic Universe ===
After Disney acquired the film rights to the X-Men in 2019, Patrick Stewart returned to the role of Charles Xavier in Marvel Cinematic Universe's 2022 film Doctor Strange in the Multiverse of Madness, and Kelsey Grammer's Hank McCoy / Beast returned in the post-credit scene of 2023's The Marvels. Since then, Hugh Jackman's Wolverine and Aaron Stanford's Pyro returned along with other characters from the original X-Men trilogy in 2024's Deadpool & Wolverine. In March 2025, Marvel Studios announced several actors from across the original X-Men trilogy will be returning to reprise their roles in Avengers: Doomsday (2026), with McKellen, Stewart, Grammer, Marsden and Romjin reprising their roles from this film, being included among the principal cast of the film alongside characters from the MCU.
