= Yacumama =

Legendary serpent in Amazonian folklore

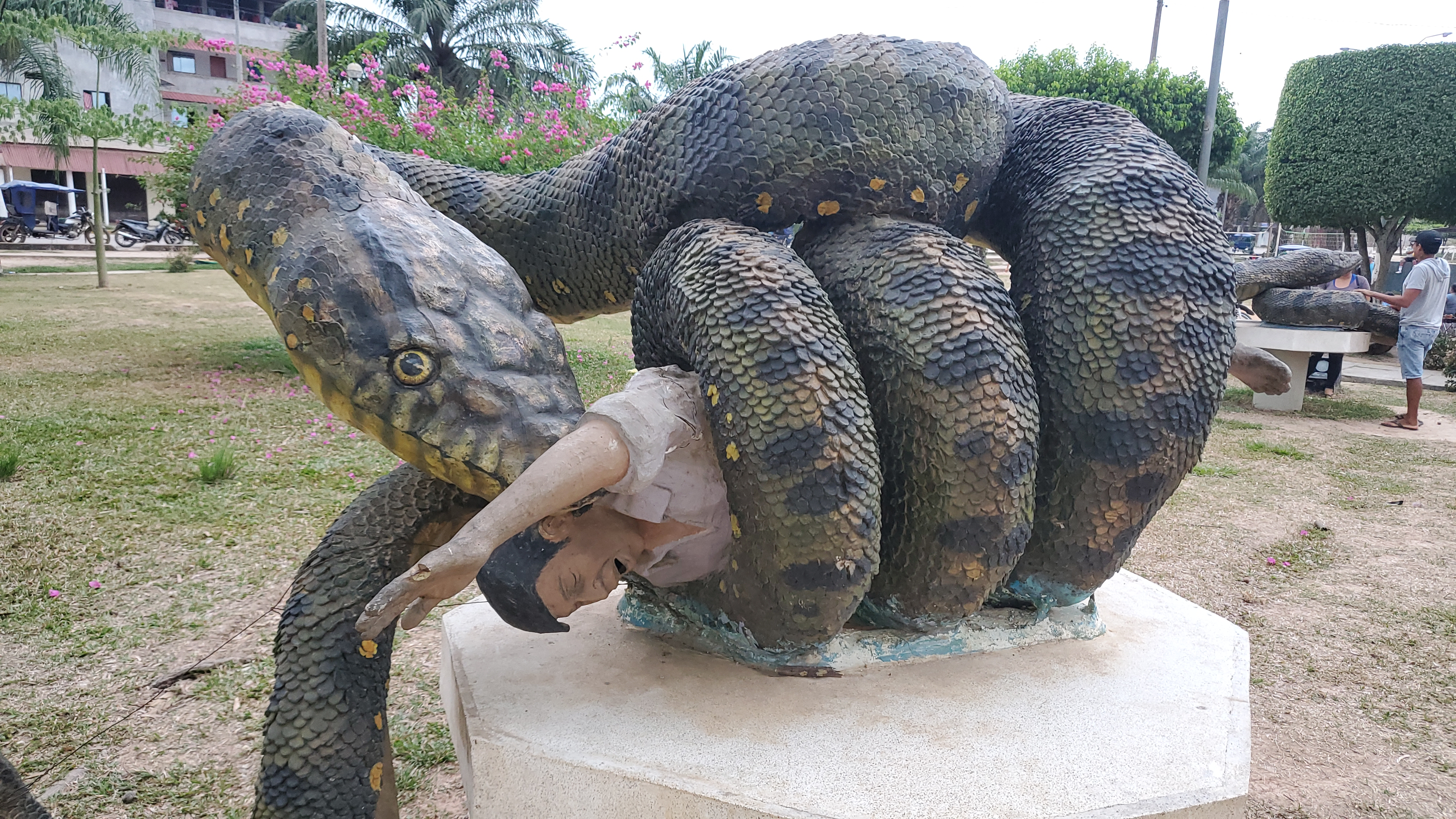
A statue of the mythical serpent in the process of constricting a man.

Yacumama (from Quechua for "mother of water"), is an enormous mythical serpent said to inhabit the Amazon rainforest. It is considered the mother of all aquatic animals in Indigenous folklore, and fantastical powers have been ascribed to the Yacumama in legend, such as the ability to project streams of water capable of felling trees as well as the ability to generate suction capable of drawing in objects from 100 metres (330 ft) distance. To protect themselves, local Indigenous peoples would blow a conch horn before entering the water, believing that the Yacumama would reveal itself if it were present. The Yacumama has been said to measure over 50 metres (160 ft) in length, and has sometimes been depicted as possessing a back adorned with spikes. It is believed to have been based off of the Titanoboa, an extinct snake estimated to have grown to sizes of 20 metres (66 ft).

== See also ==
- Amaru – Serpent or dragon from Andean mythologies
- Boiuna – Legendary serpent in Brazilian mythology
