= Boiuna =

Legendary serpent in Brazilian mythology

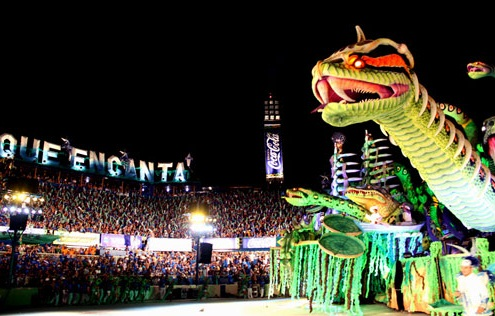
A representation of Boiuna at a festival in Brazil.

The Boiuna (translated as "Black Snake") is a legendary creature found in Brazilian mythology. It is also known as the Cobra-Grande (translated as "Large Serpent") and the Mboiaçu.

== Mythology ==
The Boiuna is a nocturnal, snakelike creature with reflective skin, considered the most powerful denizen of the rivers within the Amazon rainforest. It is said to have the ability to take on various shapes as a means of luring its prey, or as a means to frighten off any fishermen that venture into its territory. Among the forms into which the Boiuna can transform are canoes, steamboats, sailboats, and women. According to conservation biologist Beatriz Cosendey, the green anaconda has a "major role in legends including the 'Boiuna' and the 'Cobra Grande'".

== In popular culture ==
- The Boiuna appears in The River. Initially, it is portrayed as an uncharted stretch of the Amazon that curves through the jungle like a snake's coils and is home to all manner of paranormal occurrences. As one character states: "The further we go up the Boiuna, the further the laws of physics break down." Later, it is revealed that the Boiuna is actually the evil life force of the river itself, and the series ends with the very river changing shape to prevent the characters from escaping, trapping them in the jungle permanently.
- The Boiuna also appears in AdventureQuest Worlds. This version of the Boiuna is a recolored version of Snake. It is among the creatures that attack Terra da Festa before the Carnaval Party.
- In the 2026 horror movie Beware Boiúna, Boiuna is the main antagonist.

== See also ==
- Amaru – Serpent or dragon from Andean mythologies
- Yacumama – Legendary serpent in Amazonian folklore
