= Summer School (2006 film) =

2006 anthology film

- Directed by: Lance Hendrickson; Troy McCall; Mike Nelson; Steve Rhoden; Ben Trandem
- Written by: Lance Hendrickson; Mike Nelson; Steven Rhoden; Pa Chia Thao; Ben Trandem
- Produced by: Lance Hendrickson; Ben Trandem
- Starring: Simon Wallace; Amy Cocchiarella; Tony Czech; Lance Hendrickson; Jennifer Prettyman; Ty Richardson
- Cinematography: Troy McCall; Mike Nelson
- Edited by: Mike Nelson; Ben Trandem
- Music by: Tom Hambleton
- Production company: Random Creatureface Films
- Distributed by: Game On! Minnesota
- Release date: October 5, 2006
- Running time: 89 minutes
- Country: United States
- Language: English

Summer School is a 2006 American independent horror anthology film created by Minnesota-based production company Random Creatureface Films.

== Plot synopsis ==
Charles runs a website that reviews the macabre side of the cinema world, and he has stayed up late trying to catch up on his work by doing a horror movie marathon. In his rapid absorption of an endless series of dark delicacies, Charles has emerged the next day, the first day of Summer School, in a bit of a mental flux. He is slipping in and out of consciousness, into a realm of sadistic, genre-bending nightmares that test his sanity and question his grip on reality.

== Police incident ==
In August 2005, St. Paul, Minnesota, police were called to a local neighborhood to investigate a possible shooting involving a parked car. The car contained "blood" and "brain matter" on the seats, dashboard, and windows. After canvassing the area, the officers discovered the owner of the car, Lance Hendrickson, one of the directors. The blood and bits of brain were fake—the officers were shown the scene from the then in-production film as proof.

== Reception ==
Dread Central calls the film "wildly entertaining", saying it has "set a new standard... for all other independent horror films, it is a sterling standard." Dread Central also reviewed the "Extra Credit" edition DVD, giving even more praise. The two articles give the film a 4.5 out of 5 and the special features a 4 out of 5. Fatally Yours says it is "wonderfully clever", "a slice of horror heaven pie", and "a film by horror fans, for horror fans."

The film was also nominated for several awards, winning Mike Nelson and Ben Trandem an award for Best Editing in 2007.

- Nominations for Best Editing, Best Director, and Best Movie from B-Movie Film Festival in 2007.
- B-Movie Award for Best Editing from B-Movie Film Festival in 2007.
- Nominated for Best Feature Film at Eerie Horror Film Fest in 2006.
