= Wheels of Terror =

1990 television film directed by Christopher Cain

- Television release poster
- Genre: Horror; Thriller
- Written by: Alan B. McElroy
- Directed by: Christopher Cain
- Starring: Joanna Cassidy; Marcie Leeds; Carlos Cervantes; Arlen Dean Snyder; Henry Max Kendrick
- Music by: Jay Gruska
- Country of origin: United States
- Original language: English

Production
- Executive producer: Stanley M. Brooks
- Producer: Richard Learman
- Cinematography: Richard Bowen
- Editor: Steven Cohen
- Running time: 85 minutes
- Production companies: Paramount Pictures; Paramount Television; Once Upon a Time Films; Wilshire Court Productions; MTE

Original release
- Network: USA Network
- Release: July 11, 1990

Wheels of Terror (also known as Terror in Copper Valley) is a 1990 American made-for-television thriller film directed by Christopher Cain and starring Joanna Cassidy and Marcie Leeds. The film originally debuted on the USA Network in 1990. The plot concerns the unseen driver of a primer gray Dodge Charger, (consisting of mixed year's makes 1971, 1974) kidnapping, molesting, and sometimes murdering young girls around the fictional locale of Copper Valley, Arizona and a bus driver who chases the car, after it kidnaps her daughter played by Marcie Leeds.

Marcie Leeds was nominated for a Young Artist Award for Best Young Actress in a Cable Special.

== Plot ==
On a desert highway in Arizona, a man and his daughter have broken down on the side of the road. After a truck does not stop to help them, they are then approached by a dirt-covered black 1974 Dodge Charger with a 400 V8. The driver of the Charger (who is never seen) then strikes the man, killing him, before backing up and abducting the screaming girl. Later, the girl is seen walking down the deserted highway, with signs of being assaulted. She is then spotted by two highway patrol officers, who put her in the back of their police car and take her to the hospital.

Meanwhile, in the nearby town of Copper Valley, Laura is a newly hired bus driver who has moved from Los Angeles, California in hopes of the small town being a better place to raise her daughter, Stephanie. One day, she encounters the black Charger as she is taking kids home from school on a 1982 Chevrolet G30 Wayne Busette. Shortly afterwards, the driver follows a young girl home and abducts her. The girl is sexually assaulted, but is later found alive, although clearly traumatized by what has happened. As the driver of the car continuously stalks Laura, it soon abducts Stephanie's friend Kim who is later found dead, floating in a nearby lake.

Laura visits the police station and talks with Detective Drummond, who says that in spite of all of the searches, nobody claims to have seen the car or its driver. The night after Kim's funeral, the Charger reappears in front of Laura's house. As Laura tries to contact the detective, the driver continues to rev his engine and drive around the front of the house, but soon drives away into the night. The following day, Stephanie is waiting on her mother to pick her up from gymnastics practice, but Laura is delayed by a passing freight train. As Laura arrives, the Charger appears and abducts Stephanie in front of her, prompting her to give chase, with kids still on the bus.

After pursuing the car through town and down dirt roads, Laura loses sight of the car and is pulled over by a motorcycle cop. While the officer is talking to Laura and calling for backup, the car reappears and rams the cop, killing him instantly. The driver then speeds away with Stephanie leaning out the window, crying for help. Laura resumes the chase after the car, despite the kids continuously pleading for her to slow down. Soon, the bus nearly drives off the edge of a cliff near a train bridge. As Laura tries to restart the bus and put it in reverse, the car appears behind the bus and rams it repeatedly, trying to send it over the edge, but Laura manages to start up the bus and back it away from the edge, making the chase resume once again.

Laura chases the car to a construction site and lets the kids off, asking them to call the police at a nearby trailer. After a long hunt, the car appears and tries to run Laura down when she gets out of the bus, but she manages to climb aboard and continue the chase. As they rumble into a quarry, Laura rams the car repeatedly, but is unsuccessful at stopping it. Finally, after a lengthy chase around the quarry, Stephanie manages to climb out of the Charger and climb onto the bus to her mother. Laura then rams the Charger and sends it tumbling over the edge of a cliff. Laura and Stephanie are tearfully reunited, however, just when it seems that the whole ordeal is ending, the car unexpectedly reappears, with its roof visibly caved-in, and accelerates straight towards the bus.

Laura manages to restart the bus and reverse out of the path of the speeding Charger, causing the car to fly off of a cliff and drop down into the quarry. The car lands in a small storage building full of explosives, resulting in an explosion which incinerates the car and the driver.

In the ending scene, Laura and Stephanie are seen boarding the school bus and driving off into the sunset.

== Cast ==
- Joanna Cassidy as Laura
- Marcie Leeds as Stephanie
- Carlos Cervantes as Luis
- Arlen Dean Snyder as Detective Drummond
- Henry Max Kendrick as Kellogg

== Reception ==
Ken Tucker Entertainment Weekly suggested that audiences "will probably be too bored to be frightened."

== Home media ==
Wheels of Terror was first released on VHS on February 28, 1991 by Paramount Video. On September 9, 2013, Up All Night Films released the film in a retro video format case.

== See also ==
- The Car
