= Memory box =

Box containing objects that serve as reminders

A memory box is a box containing objects that serve as reminders. A person may make a memory box as a way to organize meaningful items from their own life. A person grieving somebody who has died may find it helpful to make a memory box with objects and papers related to the person, sometimes with personalized decorations as a form of art therapy. Making and reviewing the contents of a memory box can be part of life story work and reminiscence therapy.

== Dementia ==
In cases of dementia, a memory box may be used as a form of therapy to remind the patient of their earlier life.

== Bereavement ==
Memory boxes are provided by some hospitals in the event of stillbirth, miscarriage, or other problem during or after childbirth. They contain objects belonging to or representing the deceased child to help relatives come to terms with their loss. Memory boxes are usually donated by local charities and organizations.
