= After the Sunset =

2004 film directed by Brett Ratner

- International poster
- Directed by: Brett Ratner
- Screenplay by: Paul Zbyszewski; Craig Rosenberg
- Story by: Paul Zbyszewski
- Produced by: Beau Flynn; Jay Stern; Tripp Vinson
- Starring: Pierce Brosnan; Salma Hayek; Woody Harrelson; Don Cheadle; Naomie Harris
- Cinematography: Dante Spinotti
- Edited by: Mark Helfrich
- Music by: Lalo Schifrin
- Distributed by: New Line Cinema
- Release date: November 12, 2004
- Running time: 97 minutes
- Country: United States
- Language: English
- Budget: $57-60 million
- Box office: $62.7 million

After the Sunset is a 2004 American heist action comedy film directed by Brett Ratner and starring Pierce Brosnan as Max Burdett, a master thief caught in a pursuit with FBI agent Stan Lloyd, played by Woody Harrelson. It was shot in the Bahamas. The film was released by New Line Cinema on November 12, 2004, and met with negative reviews and flopped at the box office.

== Plot ==
FBI Agent Stan Lloyd has been assigned to transport the second of three famous 'Napoleon' diamonds, cautious that master thief Max Burdett will potentially steal it, having previously stolen the first. His convoy is interrupted by a scruffy-looking man washing his windscreen, whom Lloyd tips a dollar to leave. However, the man uses a modified squeegee to scan the car's VIN which allows Max to gain control of the vehicle, driving it to a warehouse. Max meets with the squeegee man and they passionately kiss, who then pulls off a mask revealing his girlfriend, Lola, in disguise. Lloyd shoots Max before passing out from being gassed by the thieves. Max survives and tells Lola to get the diamond, which she does, leaving in its place the one-dollar bill that she had received from Lloyd earlier. Max and Lola then fly to Paradise Island in The Bahamas.

Lloyd shows up 6 months later and accuses Burdett of planning to steal the third Napoleon diamond, which is on a cruise ship that will be docking for a week on the island. He denies this, and unwittingly turns the tables and befriends the frustrated detective Lloyd, showing him the pleasures that Paradise Island has to offer, even paying for the most expensive suite, the bridge suite, for as long as Lloyd is there.

Lloyd, out of his element, adapts quickly to the easy-going Caribbean lifestyle. He partners up with Sophie, a local constable, to try to capture Max at last when he steals the diamond, which Max visits and later gives in to the temptation to steal. Henri Mooré, a powerful, popular tycoon thought of by some as a gangster, learns of Burdett's impressive history as a thief. So, he offers him additional island-life benefits and pleasures in return for stealing the diamond.

Burdett, still wanting the diamond for himself, pretends to work with Mooré. He gives him a fake plan as to how he would steal the diamond (which he had earlier related to Stan), having no trouble keeping ahead of his nemesis in the meantime. Lola kicks Max out after he breaks his promise to spend their first sunset on her new deck she had been working on and after she finds out he lied about writing his vows to her.

Max is forced to bunk with Lloyd, and they share their thoughts about each other's lives. The next morning, the authorities and Sophie discover them, revealing that Lloyd is suspended from the FBI. They team up to win back Sophie and Lola, but Max still gives in and uses the dive trip as a distraction to steal the diamond, which works perfectly when Mooré's man tries at the same time but is caught after the fake plan doesn't work.

After the fallout, Lola leaves Max after Lloyd shoots Mooré dead when he comes for the diamond. Max realizes his error, writes his vows, and manages to win back Lola at the airport before she leaves, proposing to her with "the first diamond he ever bought".

The next day, Max is met by Lloyd while celebrating, who reveals he set him up and let Max do all the work while he later recovered the diamond as he'd seen him preparing the hiding place for it. Max concedes that his nemesis has won this time and is simply happy to live out his life with Lola, watching sunsets with her.

As Max and Lola are enjoying themselves on the beach, Max uses a remote control on Stan's car that has arrived at the airport, using it to mess with Stan, who quickly realizes what is going on and is unable to do anything about it. Lola asks Max if this is the "last time", which he agrees to.

== Cast ==
- Pierce Brosnan as Max Burdett
- Salma Hayek as Lola Cirillo
- Woody Harrelson as FBI Agent Stan Lloyd
- Don Cheadle as Henri Mooré
- Naomie Harris as Sophie
- Rex Linn as FBI Agent Kowalski
- Mykelti Williamson as FBI Agent Stafford
- Troy Garity as Luc
- Obba Babatundé as Zacharias
- Michael Bowen as FBI Driver
- Russell Hornsby as Jean-Paul, Mooré's bodyguard
- Mark Moses as Lakers FBI Agent
- Chris Penn as Rowdy Fan
- Joel McKinnon Miller as Wendell
- Alan Dale as Security Chief
- Noémie Lenoir as Mooré's Girl

The film also features several cameos, including Gary Payton, Karl Malone, and Shaquille O'Neal as themselves, Edward Norton as a ringside-seat audience member, John Michael Higgins as the hotel manager, and Jeff Garlin and Kate Walsh as a couple at the resort.

== Production ==
Paul Zbyszewski's original screenplay for After the Sunset was discovered by producers Beau Flynn and Tripp Vinson, both known for producing movies such as Tigerland (2000) and Requiem for a Dream (2000). The script was purchased by New Line Cinema, and the producers hired Australian screenwriter Craig Rosenberg to create a re-write. Both the studio and the producers agreed that their first choice for the role of master thief Max Burdett was Pierce Brosnan. Salma Hayek, Oscar-nominated for her role in Frida (2002), was the next actor to join the cast.

Next to join the film was director Brett Ratner. The film had originally been scheduled to be directed by John Stockwell but he dropped out due to creative differences. Talking about joining the movie, Ratner said: "I love caper films. There are so many great films in this genre, but what makes After the Sunset different is that it's a heist movie that has a combination of great relationships, heart, and comedy."

Chris Tucker and Jackie Chan were both offered film cameos as police officers (a nod to the Rush Hour series which Brett Ratner also directed) but turned them down.

With the two leads set, Woody Harrelson was cast in the role of Burdett's nemesis, FBI agent Stanley Lloyd. Harrelson said during promotion: "When this movie came along, I loved it right away." Don Cheadle's casting marked a third collaboration with Ratner, following The Family Man (2000) and Rush Hour 2 (2001). The role of Sophie, the Bahamian cop, was the next role to be cast. British actress Naomie Harris landed the role.

With the majority of the script set on an island in the Caribbean, the filmmakers decided to shoot in The Bahamas, based out of the Atlantis resort in Nassau.

== Reception ==
=== Box office ===
The film opened at number 3 in North America, earning $11,100,392 in its opening weekend behind The Incredibles and The Polar Express, with its widest release in 2,819 theaters. It grossed $28,331,233 domestically and $33,016,564 in international markets, adding up to a worldwide gross of $61,347,797.

=== Critical response ===
Review aggregator Rotten Tomatoes gave it an 18% approval rating based on 136 reviews. The site's critical consensus reads: "A slick but bland thriller." On Metacritic, the film has a weighted average score of 38 out of 100 based on 32 critics, indicating "generally unfavorable" reviews.

Ty Burr from The Boston Globe saw the film's potential as a "decent heist flick" during the opening robbery scene but felt it devolves into a plotless drag involving sightseeing and female-ogling in the Bahamas. Peter Howell of the Toronto Star gave note of Zbyszewski and Rosenberg's script feeling barebones within its given genre and moving "unsteadily between crime drama and romantic farce", and Ratner's direction matching it in terms of tonal whiplash and coming across like a "tourist infomercial," calling it "one of the most lackadaisical Hollywood projects of the year." Scott Tobias of The A.V. Club criticized Ratner and Zbyszewski for making a "pale revision" of Michael Mann's Heat that sidesteps both the heist and interesting characters for more macho posturing and homophobic humor between its two male leads.

Entertainment Weekly's Owen Gleiberman gave the film a B− grade, calling it "a knowingly preposterous toy thriller--a sheer escape from consequence." Roger Ebert pointed out the numerous plot machinations and "behavior-circling clichés" amongst the characters throughout the film but gave it credit for accomplishing the type of entertainment it aims to be, despite there being better movie choices for film-goers to check out, saying that "After the Sunset is skillfully made, but it's not necessary […] On the other hand, should you see it, the time will pass pleasantly." James Berardinelli found the film to be "a mess, but [it's] a fun, breezy mess", criticizing the overall heist and weak characterization but gave praise to the quick pacing, three-way chemistry between Brosnan, Hayek and Harrelson, and Dante Spinotti's cinematography for capturing the "natural beauty" of its Caribbean setting, saying "despite not being especially well-written, it nevertheless offers a 100-minute, unpretentious diversion."
