= Wrong Turn (2003 film) =

2003 film by Rob Schmidt

- Theatrical release poster
- Directed by: Rob Schmidt
- Written by: Alan B. McElroy
- Produced by: Stan Winston; Brian Gilbert; Erik Feig; Robert Kulzer
- Starring: Desmond Harrington; Eliza Dushku; Emmanuelle Chriqui; Jeremy Sisto; Kevin Zegers
- Cinematography: John S. Bartley
- Edited by: Michael Ross
- Music by: Elia Cmíral
- Production companies: Constantin Film; Summit Entertainment; Newmarket Capital Group
- Distributed by: Regency Enterprises (Note: Both the Fox and Regency studio logos were omitted in all of North American releases of the film.) (through 20th Century Fox, United States and Canada); Constantin Film (Germany and Austria); Summit Entertainment (International)
- Release date: May 30, 2003
- Running time: 84 minutes
- Countries: Germany; United States; Canada
- Language: English
- Budget: $12.6 million
- Box office: $28.7 million

Wrong Turn is a 2003 slasher film directed by Rob Schmidt, written by Alan B. McElroy, and starring Desmond Harrington, Eliza Dushku, Emmanuelle Chriqui, Jeremy Sisto, and Kevin Zegers. The first installment in the Wrong Turn film series, it follows a group of six individuals being stalked by deformed, inbred, cannibalistic mountain men in the woods of West Virginia.

Development for the film began in 2001 when it was announced Summit Entertainment and Newmarket Group teamed to produce Wrong Turn, a 1970s-style horror film to be directed by Schmidt, from a script written by McElroy. The film was a co-production between Summit and Constantin Film, with Stan Winston designing the creature effects and serving as a producer.

Wrong Turn was released on May 30, 2003 in the United States by 20th Century Fox and Regency Enterprises. Although it grossed $28.7 million worldwide against a $12 million budget, it received mixed reviews from critics, with its criticisms aimed towards its overdone writing.

== Plot ==
Two college students, Rich Stoker and Halley Smith, are rock climbing in a remote forest of West Virginia. Rich reaches the top of a cliff and before he can help Halley up, he is attacked and killed. Someone begins to yank Halley up the cliff, forcing her to cut the rope and fall to the ground. She flees but is caught in a line of barbed wire and pulled back into the woods, screaming.

Sometime later, medical student Chris Flynn drives through the mountains of West Virginia on his way to a business meeting but is caught in a traffic jam. After waiting for some time, he decides to take a detour through a remote mountain road to avoid the congestion. Unfamiliar with the area, he stops at a gas station to ask directions, and the elderly owner named Maynard is of no help. Chris finds a map and decides to go down Bear Mountain Road. He collides with a stopped car whose tires have been punctured. The car belongs to a group of college students on a camping trip: Jessie, Carly, Scott, Evan, and Francine. They discover that their tire actually hit barbed wires, which were intentionally laid by someone.

While Evan and Francine watch the cars, the others go to find help. Evan disappears after he hears something from the woods, and Francine finds his ear on the ground. A mysterious figure strangles Francine with a length of barbed wire. The remaining group enters an isolated cabin and are horrified to find human body parts inside. The occupants return home, forcing them to hide. Three cannibalistic inbred mountain men, Three Finger, Saw Tooth, and One Eye, enter the cabin with Francine's corpse. The hiding group watches as they dismember and eat her.

After the cannibals fall asleep, the group attempts to escape, but their captors awaken and chase them into the forest. The group finds previous victims' cars and tries to make up an escape plan. Chris gets shot in the leg while trying to distract the cannibals, and the girls take him to a truck, where they find Evan's body. Scott attempts another diversion for the other three to escape but gets killed with arrows. Jessie, Carly, and Chris stumble upon an old watchtower and call for help using an old radio. The cannibals arrive and are alerted when the radio responds to the group's call. Unable to get inside, the attackers set the tower on fire, forcing the three to jump out into the trees. In the ensuing chase, Carly is half-decapitated with an axe by Three Finger, who is then thrown from the treetops by Chris. Jessie and Chris take refuge behind a waterfall in a cave. Jessie tearfully tells Chris that she feels responsible for what happened to her friends, as they had planned the camping trip to cheer her up after her breakup. Chris consoles her.

In the morning, the cannibals find them, pushing Chris down the hill, then taking Jessie back to their cabin. Chris survives the fall and meets a police officer, who is promptly shot through the eye with an arrow by Saw Tooth. Chris hides in the woods. Saw Tooth takes the keys from the dead officer and drives the police truck back to the cabin, while Chris sneaks out of the woods and hides holding on under the truck to go back for Jessie.

Back at the cabin, Jessie is tied down to a bed and watches as the cannibals chop off the dead police officer's head. Chris sets the cabin on fire and drives the police officer's truck into the cabin. He frees Jessie, and as they flee Chris destroys the cabin by shooting at a fuel tank. The pair drive away in the cannibals' pickup truck. At Maynard's gas station, Chris stops and rips off the map, before leaving.

In a mid-credits scene, a deputy sheriff who had received the radio call earlier investigates the remains of the destroyed cabin and is killed by a maniacally laughing Three Finger, who had survived the explosion.

== Cast ==
- Desmond Harrington as Chris Flynn
- Eliza Dushku as Jessie Burlingame
- Emmanuelle Chriqui as Carly
- Jeremy Sisto as Scott
- Kevin Zegers as Evan
- Lindy Booth as Francine
- Julian Richings as Three Finger
- Garry Robbins as Saw Tooth
- Ted Clark as One Eye
- Yvonne Gaudry as Halley Smith
- Joel Harris as Rich Stoker
- David Huband as Trooper
- Wayne Robson as Maynard Odets
- James Downing as Trucker

== Production ==
Development for the film began in 2001 when it was announced Summit Entertainment and Newmarket Group teamed to produce Wrong Turn, a 1970s-style horror film to be directed by Rob Schmidt. Alan B. McElroy, who had begun his career in 1988 as a screenwriter for Halloween 4: The Return of Michael Myers, wrote the script. McElroy devised the idea for the film after he and his wife were forced to detour on a rural side road during a snowstorm to avoid a major traffic collision: "As we're doing that, in the dark, in a snowstorm, we're thinking, 'Is this a smart idea?'" McElroy recalled. "Anything could go wrong!"

Though set in West Virginia, filming of Wrong Turn took place in a nature reserve north of Toronto, Ontario, Canada. Additional photography, including the sequence set in the forest station tower, occurred on a set. While shooting a sequence in which her character falls through a series of tree branches, actress Emmanuelle Chriqui really did fall and dislocate her shoulder, requiring weeks of recovery.

== Music ==
Two soundtracks were released; one contains the original film score, and the other contains popular music.

=== Soundtrack ===
Wrong Turn: Soundtrack from the Motion Picture

Soundtrack album by Various artists
- Released: July 1, 2003
- Length: 47:01
- Label: Lakeshore Records

Track listing

1. "In Stance" – Eris
2. "Bloody Fingers" – Jet Black Summer
3. "Every Famous Last Word" – Miracle of 86
4. "Never Said Anything" – The Belles
5. "Why Would I Want to Die?" – Grandaddy
6. "Haunted" – King Black Acid
7. "Three Murders" – Deadman
8. "Ex" – Tara King Theory
9. "Birthday" – Simple
10. "Even the Scars Forget the Wound" – Grüvis Malt
11. "He's a Killer" – DJ Swamp
12. "Bring the Pain"/"Multiple Incisions" – Candiria
13. "If Only" – Queens of the Stone Age
14. "Wish I May" – Breaking Benjamin

=== Score ===
Wrong Turn: Original Motion Picture Score

Soundtrack album by Elia Cmíral
- Released: June 3, 2003
- Genre: Film score
- Length: 45:43
- Label: Varèse Sarabande

Track listing

1. "Dark Forest"
2. "Wrong Turn Title"
3. "Mountain Men"
4. "Cabin In The Woods"
5. "Adventure Begins"
6. "Mountain Men At Home"
7. "Francine Dies"
8. "Jessie"
9. "Scott Becomes Prey"
10. "Bear Trap"
11. "Escape From Cabin"
12. "Jessie Taken Hostage"
13. "Fire In The Watchtower"
14. "Grim Discovery"
15. "Are We Safe?"
16. "They Got Carly"
17. "Killing Mountain Men"
18. "We Are Alive"
19. "Three Finger is Back"

== Release ==
Wrong Turn was theatrically released in the United States on May 30, 2003, by 20th Century Fox. The film was a co-production, Summit Entertainment and Constantin Film, with Stan Winston designing the creature effects and serving as a producer. Inking a deal with 20th Century Fox and Regency Enterprises, the co-financiers of Wrong Turn secured domestic distribution through Fox. Fox reportedly had trouble securing an R-rating from the MPAA due to the film's intense violence, with many of the TV spots for the film also being refused approval; this is possibly one of the reasons why subsequent Wrong Turn films were released straight to video.

In 2019, Rupert Murdoch sold most of 21st Century Fox's film and television assets to Disney, and Wrong Turn and its subsequent direct-to-video sequels were some of the films included in the deal. As such, and in an effort to appeal to mature audiences instead of just family audiences, Wrong Turn was one of the very first R-rated films, as well as the first ever in the horror genre, released on Disney+ in the United States on April 2022, but the decision was eventually dropped by the time it became available in Canada instead.

== Reception ==
=== Box office ===
Released in the United States on May 30, 2003, Wrong Turn earned $5,161,498 during its opening weekend among 1,615 theaters. It went to gross a total of $15,418,790 in the United States and $13,231,785 internationally, making for a worldwide gross of $28,650,575.

=== Critical response ===
On the review aggregator website Rotten Tomatoes, 41% of 82 critics' reviews are positive, with an average rating of 4.5/10. The website's consensus reads: "An unremarkable slasher flick that fails to distinguished itself from others of its ilk." Metacritic, which uses a weighted average, assigned the film a score of 32 out of 100, based on 17 critics, indicating "generally unfavorable" reviews. Audiences polled by CinemaScore gave the film an average grade of "C−" on an A+ to F scale.

Barbara Ellen of The Times wrote "This could have been a half decent cross between a Romero zombie movie and The Texas Chain Saw Massacre but in the end the gore is so ridiculously overdone and the script so lame, that it undermines all sense of suspense". William Thomas of Empire said "It's better than any of the official Texas Chainsaw Massacre sequels. Which is probably a good thing". Scott Foundas of Variety criticized Wrong Turn for being "A negative pickup by Fox", adding that "[it was] dumped into theaters on Friday without benefit of press previews", resulting in "frightless torpor".

A one out of four stars was awarded to the film by Marc Savlov of The Austin Chronicle who wrote "This was already tired stuff when cult fave Sleepaway Camp came out in 1983, and it's downright comatose by now". BBC's Nev Pierce gave the film two out of five, while Anita Gates of The New York Times called it "[a] lazy would-be horror film".

== Franchise ==
=== Sequels ===
Wrong Turn was followed by several films including two sequels, Wrong Turn 2: Dead End (2007) and Wrong Turn 3: Left for Dead (2009).

=== Prequel series ===
Two prequels leading to the events of the original film, Wrong Turn 4: Bloody Beginnings (2011) and Wrong Turn 5: Bloodlines (2012).

=== Reboot ===
A reboot titled Wrong Turn 6: Last Resort was released in 2014.

=== Second reboot ===
In October 2018, another reboot simply titled Wrong Turn (2021) was announced. The film was written by original film's writer Alan B. McElroy and directed by Mike P. Nelson. Principal photography for the movie began on September 9, 2019. Though initially planned for a 2020 release, the film was held until 2021 due to the COVID-19 pandemic. After an announcement on December 16, 2020, the film was domestically released theatrically for a one-night run on January 26, 2021.
