= Mike P. Nelson =

American film director

- Born: Michael Paul Nelson; December 18, 1982; Saint Paul, Minnesota, U.S.
- Education: Minneapolis College of Art and Design (BFA)
- Occupations: Film director, screenwriter, film editor, cinematographer, actor
- Years active: 2004–present
- Known for: The Domestics; Wrong Turn; Silent Night, Deadly Night; Beware Boiúna

Michael Paul Nelson (born December 18, 1982) is an American filmmaker. He is known for directing the horror films The Domestics (2018), Wrong Turn (2021), Silent Night, Deadly Night (2025), and Beware Boiúna (2026).

== Life and career ==
Nelson was born in Saint Paul, Minnesota on December 18, 1982. He began his career writing, directing, acting, and editing numerous short films and feature films. He also worked as a foley artist, sound designer and music editor on television shows and films such as Diner's Drive-Ins and Dives, 5-25-77, Chicago Overcoat and The Immaculate Conception of Little Dizzle.

In 2018, he made his directorial debut with the action horror film The Domestics, starring Kate Bosworth, Tyler Hoechlin, and Lance Reddick. It premiered at the Cinepocalypse Film Festival on June 21, 2018, and was released in the United States by Orion Classics on June 28, 2018.

In 2021, he directed the horror film Wrong Turn, a reboot of the 2003 film of the same name and seventh installment in the Wrong Turn franchise. The film was released in theaters and on video on demand in the United States by Saban Films on January 26, 2021.

In 2023, he wrote and directed the segments No Wake / Ambrosia for the horror anthology film V/H/S/85, the sixth installment in the V/H/S franchise. It premiered at Fantastic Fest on September 22, 2023, and was released digitally by Shudder on October 6, 2023.

In 2025, he wrote and directed the horror film Silent Night, Deadly Night, a reboot of the 1984 film of the same name and seventh installment in the Silent Night, Deadly Night franchise. The film was produced by Cineverse, StudioCanal, and original film producers Scott Schneid and Dennis Whitehead. It premiered at Fantastic Fest on September 21, 2025, and was released in the United States by Cineverse on December 12, 2025. That same year, he wrote and directed a 13-minute short horror film titled Sweet Revenge, which was released on August 13, 2025, as part of the Friday the 13th franchise's 45th anniversary.

In 2026, he directed the horror film Beware Boiúna, which premiered at Fantastic Fest on September 17, 2026, and is scheduled for a theatrical release in the United States by Lionsgate on October 2, 2026. Later that year, it was announced that he is set to direct the eleventh film in the Saw franchise. James Wan and Jason Blum will serve as producers through their Blumhouse Atomic banner, alongside Leigh Whannell. It is set to be released in the United States by Lionsgate.

== Filmography ==
Short film

Year	Title	Director	Writer	Producer	Editor	Notes
2004	The G.I.	Yes	Yes	Yes	Yes	
2005	The 26th	Yes	Yes	Yes	Yes	
2006	Hill Billy	Yes	Yes	No	Yes	Segment of Summer School
2008	An American Classic	Yes	Yes	No	Yes	
2012	The Retirement of Joe Corduroy	Yes	Yes	Yes	Yes	
2015	The Domestics	Yes	Yes	No	Yes	
2016	The Goodbye	Yes	No	No	Yes	
2023	No Wake / Ambrosia	Yes	Yes	No	Yes	Segments of V/H/S/85
2025	Sweet Revenge	Yes	Yes	Yes	No	

Feature film

Year	Title	Director	Writer	Executive Producer	Ref.
2018	The Domestics	Yes	Yes	No	
2021	Wrong Turn	Yes	No	No	
2025	Silent Night, Deadly Night	Yes	Yes	No	
2026	Beware Boiúna	Yes	No	Yes	
