= Keepsake box =

A keepsake box or memory box, typically made from wood, is used for storing mementos of a special time, event or person. They are often created or purchased to mark life's major events like a christening, wedding, birthday, or First Holy Communion. They may also be given for sad occasions of bereavement, such as the stillbirth of a child, when a keepsake/memory box helps with the grieving process. This sort of a keepsake box may be personalised with a person's name, design or picture.

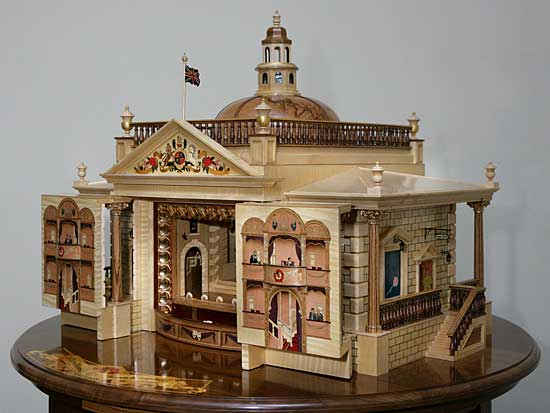
Pantheon Theatre Memory Box by Wheathills

In September 2011 the BBC highlighted a modern example of a particularly intricate memory box, in the form of a Pantheon Theatre, containing over 10,000 pieces of marquetry, taking 18 months to create.
