= List of films set in West Virginia =

List of films that either take place or were made in the U.S. state, West Virginia

This list includes movies/shows that either take place or were made, in West Virginia or the surrounding area:

== Films ==
indicates major film award recognition

=== 1920–1969 ===
Title	Director	Release	Location	Note
Stage Struck	Allan Dwan	1925	New Martinsville, West Virginia	
Mary Stevens, M.D.	Lloyd Bacon	1933	White Sulphur Springs, West Virginia	
The Millerson Case	George Archainbaud	1947	Jefferson County, West Virginia	
Roseanna McCoy	Irving Reis & Nicholas Ray	1949		
The Night of the Hunter	Charles Laughton	1955	Moundsville, West Virginia	
Shenandoah	Andrew V. McLaglen	1965	Hardy County, West Virginia	
Holy Ghost People	Peter Adair	1967	Scrabble Creek, West Virginia	
Teen-Age Strangler	Ben Parker	1968	Huntington, West Virginia	
The Rain People	Francis Ford Coppola	1969	Fairmont, West Virginia	

=== 1970–1989 ===
Title	Director	Release	Location	Note
Fools' Parade	Andrew V. McLaglen	1971	Moundsville, West Virginia	
No Drums, No Bugles	Clyde Ware	1972		
The Gravy Train	Jack Starrett	1974		
The Deer Hunter	Michael Cimino	1978	Weirton, West Virginia	1979 Academy Awards Best Picture Winner
Reckless	James Foley	1983	Weirton, West Virginia	
Superman III	Richard Lester	1983		
Pudd'nhead Wilson	Alan Bridges	1984	Hampshire County, West Virginia	
Sweet Dreams	Karel Reisz	1985	Monroe County, West Virginia	
A Killing Affair	David Saperstein	1986	Logan County, West Virginia	
Act of Vengeance	John Mackenzie	1986	Charleston, West Virginia	
Matewan	John Sayles	1986	Mingo County, West Virginia	
Chillers	Daniel Boyd	1986	Kanawha County, West Virginia	
Big Business	Jim Abrahams	1988	Fayette County, West Virginia	
Rain Man	Barry Levinson	1988	Huntington, West Virginia	1989 Academy Awards Best Picture. One of the individuals Dustin Hoffman based his character, Raymond Babbitt, on, Joseph Sullivan, lived in Huntington, West Virginia. One of the film's premieres was later held in Huntington.
Blaze	Ron Shelton	1989	Wilsondale, West Virginia	
Strangest Dreams: Invasion of the Space Preachers	Daniel Boyd	1989	Kanawha County, West Virginia	

=== 1990–2009 ===
Title	Director	Release	Location	Note
The Turning	L.A. Puopolo	1992	Nemours, West Virginia	
The Silence of the Lambs	Jonathan Demme	1991	Clay County, West Virginia	1992 Academy Awards Best Picture
Sommersby	Jon Amiel	1993	Snowshoe, West Virginia	
Off and Running	Ed Bianchi	1991		
The Bodyguard	Mick Jackson	1992	Morgantown, West Virginia	
Lassie	Daniel Petrie	1994	Summers County, West Virginia	
Primal Fear	Gregory Hoblit	1996	McDowell County, West Virginia	
My Fellow Americans	Peter Segal	1996	Charleston, West Virginia	
Whatever	Susan Skoog	1998	Wheeling, West Virginia	
Patch Adams	Tom Shadyac	1998	Pocahontas County, West Virginia	
October Sky	Joe Johnston	1999	Coalwood, West Virginia	
Ashes to Glory	Deborah Novak	November 18, 2000	Huntington, West Virginia	
A Beautiful Mind	Ron Howard	2001	Bluefield, West Virginia	2002 Academy Awards Best Picture
The Mothman Prophecies	Mark Pellington	2002	Point Pleasant, West Virginia	
Gods and Generals	Ronald F. Maxwell	2003	Harper's Ferry, West Virginia	
Wrong Turn	Rob Schmidt	2003	Huntington, West Virginia	
Burning Annie	Van Flesher	October 9, 2003	Huntington, West Virginia	
Win a Date with Tad Hamilton!	Robert Luketic	2004	Putnam County, West Virginia	
Super Size Me	Morgan Spurlock	2004	Beckley, West Virginia	
Dark Harvest	Paul Moore	2004	Huntington, West Virginia	
Bubble	Steven Soderbergh	2005	Parkersburg, West Virginia	
The Devil and Daniel Johnston	Jeff Feuerzeig	2005		
Dear Wendy	Thomas Vinterberg	2005	Charleston, West Virginia	
The Descent	Neil Marshall	2005		
We Are Marshall	McG	2006	Huntington, West Virginia	
Header	Archibald Flancranstin	2006		
Salvage	Joshua Crook & Jeffrey Crook	2006	Parkersburg, West Virginia	
Silent Hill	Christophe Gans	2006	Silent Hill, West Virginia	
Two Tickets to Paradise	D.B. Sweeney	2006	Charleston, West Virginia	
Live Free or Die Hard	Len Wiseman	2007		
The Rock-afire Explosion	Brett Whitcomb	2008	Barboursville, West Virginia	
Timber Falls	Tony Giglio	2007	Kanawha County, West Virginia	
Wrong Turn 2: Dead End	Joe Lynch	2007	Fayette County, West Virginia	
The X-Files: I Want to Believe	Chris Carter	2008		
XIII: The Conspiracy	Duane Clark	2008		
Blood Creek	Joel Schumacher	2009	Morgan County, West Virginia	
Wrong Turn 3: Left for Dead	Declan O'Brien	2009	Clay County, West Virginia	
Still Bill	Damani Baker & Alex Vlack	2009	Raleigh County, West Virginia	

=== 2010–Present ===
Title	Director	Release	Location	Note
Unstoppable	Tony Scott	2010	Benwood, West Virginia	
Tucker & Dale vs. Evil	Eli Craig	2010	Huntington, West Virginia	
Mothman	Sheldon Wilson	2010	Point Pleasant, West Virginia	
The Wild and Wonderful Whites of West Virginia	Julien Nitzberg	2010	Boone County, West Virginia	
The Last Mountain	Bill Haney	2011		
Super 8	J. J. Abrams	2011	Wheeling, West Virginia & Weirton, West Virginia	
Wrong Turn 4: Bloody Beginnings	Declan O'Brien	2011	Fayette County, West Virginia	
Wrong Turn 5: Bloodlines	Declan O'Brien	2012		
Memory Lane	Shawn Holmes	2012	Wheeling, West Virginia	
Silent Hill: Revelation	M. J. Bassett	2012	Silent Hill, West Virginia	
A Single Shot	David M. Rosenthal	2013		
Hollow: An Interactive Documentary	Elaine McMillion Sheldon	2013	McDowell County, West Virginia	Won a Peabody Award, nominated for an Emmy Award.
Oxyana	Sean Dunne	2013	Wyoming County, West Virginia	
Pro Wrestlers vs Zombies	Cody Knotts	2013	Parkersburg, West Virginia	
The Hunted	Josh Stewart	2013		
Out of the Furnace	Scott Cooper	2013	Moundsville, West Virginia	
A Christmas Tree Miracle	JW Myers	2013	Wheeling, West Virginia	
Child of God	James Franco	2013	Greenbrier County, West Virginia	
Little Accidents	Sara Colangelo	2014	Wyoming County, West Virginia	
Surviving Cliffside	Jon Matthews	2014	Alum Creek, West Virginia	
Rand University	Marquis Daisy	2014	Rand, West Virginia & Huntington, West Virginia	Made for TV as a part of ESPN's 30 for 30 series. Examines former NFL star Randy Moss and his origins.
The Houses October Built	Bobby Roe	2014	Huntington, West Virginia	The opening scene is shot at the Camden Park amusement park.
Wrong Turn 6: Last Resort	Valeri Milev	2014	Kanawha County, West Virginia	
American Ultra	Nima Nourizadeh	2015		
Z for Zachariah	Craig Zobel	2015	Welch, West Virginia	
Hidden Figures	Theodore Melfi	2016	White Sulphur Springs, West Virginia	
Don't Let the Devil In	Courtney Fathom Sell	2016		
Hollow Creek	Guisela Moro	2016	Wyoming County, West Virginia	
The Mothman of Point Pleasant	Seth Breedlove	2017	Point Pleasant, West Virginia	
The Glass Castle	Destin Daniel Cretton	2017	Welch, West Virginia	
Logan Lucky	Steven Soderbergh	2017	Boone County, West Virginia	
Heroin(e)	Elaine McMillion Sheldon	September 3, 2017	Huntington, West Virginia	
Heroin Town	Dan Child	October 8, 2017	Huntington, West Virginia	
Feast of the Seven Fishes	Robert Tinnell	2018	Fairmont, West Virginia	
Recovery Boys	Elaine McMillion Sheldon	2018		
Fahrenheit 11/9	Michael Moore	2018		Covered the 2018 West Virginia teachers' strike. Won three Raspberry awards.
Back Fork	Josh Stewart	2019		
Dark Waters	Todd Haynes	2019	Parkersburg, West Virginia	
The Devil All the Time	Antonio Campos	2020	Coal Creek, West Virginia	
The Big Ugly	Scott Wiper	2020		
Untold: Deal with the Devil	Laura Brownson	2021	Mullens, West Virginia	
Wrong Turn	Mike P. Nelson	2021	Pocahontas County, West Virginia	
King Coal	Elaine McMillion Sheldon	2023		
Gaslit by My Husband: The Morgan Metzer Story	Lee Gabiana	2024	Shinnston, West Virginia, Fairmont, West Virginia, & Mannington, West Virginia	
Small Town Universe	Katie Dellamaggiore	2024	Green Bank, West Virginia	
American Conspiracy: The Octopus Murders	Zachary Treitz	2024	Martinsburg, West Virginia	
The Bad Guardian	Claudia Myers	2024	Marion County, West Virginia	
Captain America: Brave New World	Julius Onah	2025	Green Bank, West Virginia	The Camp Echo One scenes take place in the Green Bank area of West Virginia.
As the Sunflower Whispers	Samuel Felinton	2025	Huntington, West Virginia	
Christy	David Michôd	2025	Mullens, West Virginia	
Self-Help	Erik Bloomquist	2025	Huntington, West Virginia	
River	Joshua Giuliano	2026	Monongalia & Marion County	
The Gun on Second Street	Rohit Karn Batra	TBA	Wheeling, West Virginia	

== See also ==
- List of television shows set in West Virginia
- List of films set in Huntington, West Virginia
- List of songs about West Virginia
