= List of films set in Huntington, West Virginia =

Part or all of these movies/shows either take place or were made, in Huntington, West Virginia or the surrounding area:

== Films ==
Title	Director	Release	Note
Teen-Age Strangler	Ben Parker	1964	
Rain Man	Barry Levinson	1988	One of the individuals Dustin Hoffman based his character, Raymond Babbitt, on, Joseph Sullivan, lived in Huntington, West Virginia. One of the film's premieres was later held in Huntington.
Ashes to Glory	Deborah Novak	2000	Film set around the Southern Airways Flight 932, and Marshall University
Burning Annie	Van Flesher	2003	
Dark Harvest	Paul Moore	2004	
We Are Marshall	McG	2006	Film set around the Southern Airways Flight 932, and Marshall University
Rand University	Marquis Daisy	2014	
The Houses October Built	Bobby Roe	2014	The opening scene is shot at the Camden Park amusement park.
Heroin(e)	Elaine McMillion Sheldon	2017	
Heroin Town	Dan Child	2017	
As the Sunflower Whispers	Samuel Felinton	2025	
Self-Help	Erik Bloomquist	2025	

== Shows ==
Title	Director	Release	Note
Mr. Cartoon	George Lewis and Jule Huffman	1956–1995	Series was made in Huntington, West Virginia, and streamed on WSAZ
My Brother, My Brother and Me	Justin McElroy, Travis McElroy, and Griffin McElroy	2010–present	
Sawbones	Sydnee McElroy and Justin McElroy	2013–present	
The Adventure Zone	Griffin McElroy, Justin McElroy, Travis McElroy, and Clint McElroy	2015–present	
MUkraine	Victor Fet, Stefan Schoeberlein, Kateryna Schray, Anara Tabyshalieva	2022–present	

== See also ==
- List of films set in West Virginia
- West Virginia Film Office
