= List of songs about West Virginia =

List of songs about the U.S. state West Virginia

This is a list of songs written about the U.S. state of West Virginia or locations in the state:

Song	Artist/Band	Release year	Note
American Terrorist	Lupe Fiasco & Matthew Santos	2006	
Babydog	Eastern Regional Jam	2024	The song is about Babydog.
By and By	Caamp	2019	
Charleston Girl	Tyler Childers	2014	The song is about a girl from Charleston, West Virginia.
Circus Farm	Mind Garage	2006	
Don't This Look Like the Dark	Jason Molina	2005	
Fate of Chris Lively and Wife	Blind Alfred Reed	1927	The song tells of the death of Christopher Columbus Lively and his wife Mary Elizabeth Fisher Lively, who were killed on September 2, 1927, when a train collided with their horse and wagon at a railroad crossing near Pax, West Virginia.
Feathered Indians	Tyler Childers	2017	
Flatwoods Monster	Samuel Felinton & Yuno Miles	2026	
He's in Dallas	Reba McEntire	1991	
Hills of West Virginia	Phil Ochs	1965	
I Wanna Go Back to West Virginia	Spike Jones and His City Slickers	1944	
Jamboree Jones	Johnny Mercer & The Pied Pipers	1937	
John Hardy	Multiple artists	1924	Traditional American folk song based on the life of a railroad worker living in McDowell County, West Virginia, in the Spring of 1893.
Leaving West Virginia	Kathy Mattea	1986	
Linda Lou	Bill Monroe and His Blue Grass Boys &	1961	
Monongah, WV	Weekend	2010	
Muswell Hillbilly	The Kinks	1971	
Nobody but You	James Taylor	1972	
Railroad Man	Bill Withers	1974	
Remember	Mac Miller	2013	
Salt Pork, West Virginia	Louis Jordan & William J. Tennyson Jr.	1946	No. 8 on Billboard's list of the most played race records of 1946.
Silver Line	Sheer Mag	2019	
Stardog Champion	Mother Love Bone	1992	
Take Me Home, Country Roads	John Denver	1971	Peaked at No. 2 in the United States. Was inducted into the Grammy Hall of Fame in 1998. One of the four West Virginia state songs.
Take Me Home, Country Roads; Fallout 76 Version	Copilot Music and Sound	2018	Made for the game Fallout 76. Peaked at No. 21 on US Country Digital Songs chart.
That Happy Night	The Stanley Brothers	1959	
The Girl from West Virginia	Doyle Lawson	2004	
The Green Rolling Hills of West Virginia	Hazel Dickens & Alice Gerrard	1973	
The Legend of John Henry's Hammer	Johnny Cash	1963	
The Man from Bowling Green	Johnny Paycheck	1977	
The Skin of My Yellow Country Teeth	Clap Your Hands Say Yeah	2006	Peaked at No. 67 in Scotland.
The West Virginia Hills	Henry Everett Engle	1885	One of the four West Virginia state songs.
The Wreck of the Virginian	Blind Alfred Reed	1927	
They Don't Make 'em Like My Daddy	Loretta Lynn	1974	Peaked at No. 4 on the Billboard Hot Country Singles chart.
This Protector	The White Stripes	2001	
This Is My West Virginia	Iris Bell	1963	One of the four West Virginia state songs.
West Virginia Fantasies	Chicago	1970	
West Virginia Gals	Al Hopkins	1928	
West Virginia Mine	Jackie DeShannon	1970	
West Virginia, My Home	Hazel Dickens	1980	
West Virginia, My Home Sweet Home	Julian G. Hearne, Jr.	1947	One of the four West Virginia state songs.
West Virginia Woman	Bobby Bare & Billy Joe Shaver	1971	
Wheeling, West Virginia	Neil Sedaka	1970	Peaked at No. 20 in Australia in early 1970.
Wild West Virginia	Daniel Johnston	1981	

== See also ==
- List of films set in West Virginia
- List of television shows set in West Virginia
