= National Register of Historic Places listings in Lincoln County, West Virginia =

Location of Lincoln County in West Virginia

This is a list of the National Register of Historic Places listings in Lincoln County, West Virginia.

This is intended to be a complete list of the properties and districts on the National Register of Historic Places in Lincoln County, West Virginia, United States. The locations of National Register properties and districts, for which the latitude and longitude coordinates are included below, may be seen in a linked map.

Two properties in the county are listed on the National Register.

This National Park Service list is complete through NPS recent listings posted March 21, 2025.

Contents: Counties in West Virginia

Barbour - Berkeley - Boone - Braxton - Brooke - Cabell - Calhoun - Clay - Doddridge - Fayette - Gilmer - Grant - Greenbrier - Hampshire - Hancock - Hardy - Harrison - Jackson - Jefferson - Kanawha - Lewis - Lincoln - Logan - Marion - Marshall - Mason - McDowell - Mercer - Mineral - Mingo - Monongalia - Monroe - Morgan - Nicholas - Ohio - Pendleton - Pleasants - Pocahontas - Preston - Putnam - Raleigh - Randolph - Ritchie - Roane - Summers - Taylor - Tucker - Tyler - Upshur - Wayne - Webster - Wetzel - Wirt - Wood - Wyoming

== Current listings ==
	Name on the Register	Image	Date listed	Location	City or town	Description
1	Holley Hills Estate	Holley Hills Estate	December 1, 1980 (#80004029)	South of Alum Creek on Coal River Rd. 38°14′53″N 81°48′20″W	Alum Creek	
2	Lincoln National Bank	Lincoln National Bank	November 24, 2015 (#15000842)	219 Main St. 38°16′35″N 82°06′23″W	Hamlin	

== See also ==
- List of National Historic Landmarks in West Virginia
- National Register of Historic Places listings in West Virginia
