= West Virginia Film Office =

State government agency in West Virginia, United States

Agency overview
- Formed: 1980
- Jurisdiction: West Virginia
- Headquarters: Charleston, West Virginia
- Agency executive: Dave Lavender
- Parent agency: West Virginia Department of Economic Development
- Website: westvirginia.gov/wvfilm/

The West Virginia Film Office is a state government agency tasked with recruiting and supporting motion picture, television, and digital media production within the state of West Virginia. Operating as a division under the West Virginia Department of Economic Development, the office manages the state's film tax incentives, coordinates local crew and casting calls, and maintains a database of regional filming locations.

== History ==
The original West Virginia Film Office was founded in 1982, and operated until early 2018, when Governor Jim Justice signed legislation dismantling the agency and terminating the state's original $5 million film tax incentive program. The closure followed a state legislative audit which concluded that the tax credit yielded a low economic return on investment and failed to create a self-sustaining film ecosystem within the state. Following the dissolution, film marketing responsibilities were temporarily absorbed into the state's general tourism bureau.

In 2022, the West Virginia Legislature passed the Film Industry Investment Act. The legislation formally reinstated the West Virginia Film Office under the Department of Economic Development and introduced a restructured, uncapped tax credit system requiring a minimum in-state spend of $50,000 for eligible productions. Later that year Dave Lavender was selected to become the first manager for the office.

== Economic impact ==
Following its reinstatement, the office reported a sharp increase in localized filming activity. Independent media sources documented that the agency assisted with more than 100 media productions during both the 2024 and 2025 calendar years. In early 2026, outside production companies utilizing the state's tax incentive brought an aggregate spend of $37.3 million into the West Virginia economy between the 2022 relaunch and the first quarter of 2026.

== Infrastructure ==
The West Virginia Film Office manages the state's digital Reelscout database, which catalogs more than 5,000 local filming locations and serves as a directory for over 1,700 in-state crew members and production assets. The office also works alongside regional organizations to support the growth of Appalachian cinema, coordinating with 13 emerging independent film festivals across the state.

== Notable West Virginia films ==
Due to West Virginia's plethora of unique and diverse filming locations and film-friendly environment, the state has drawn an assortment of renowned filmmakers. Notable films and television shows produced in West Virginia are listed below.

- A Beautiful Mind
- Captain America: Brave New World
- Christy
- Dark Harvest
- Dark Waters
- Feast of the Seven Fishes
- Heroin(e)
- Hidden Figures
- Logan Lucky
- Matewan
- The Mothman Prophecies
- The Night of the Hunter
- October Sky
- Patch Adams
- Primal Fear
- The Rain People
- Shenandoah
- The Silence of the Lambs
- Silent Hill
- Superman III
- Super 8
- Super Size Me
- We Are Marshall
- Wrong Turn

== See also ==
- List of television shows set in West Virginia
