= Nathaniel Hansen =

American documentary filmmaker (born 1977)

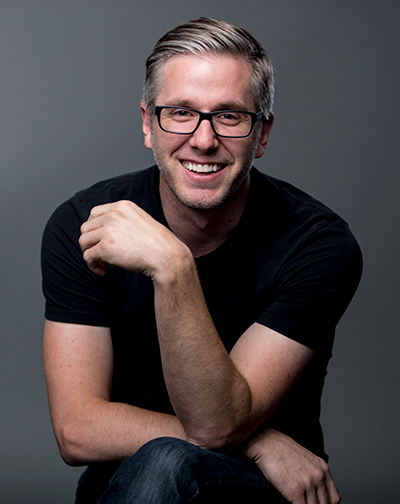
- Born: 1977 (age 48–49); Portland, Oregon, US
- Occupations: Documentary filmmaker, producer, director, editor
- Known for: The Elders (2013); Spearhunter (2015); Expired? Food Waste in America (2016); Weed & Wine (2020); The Recall: Reframed (2023)

Nathaniel Hansen is an American documentary filmmaker based in Boston, Massachusetts. His work has screened at international festivals including South by Southwest and the Independent Film Festival Boston and has been covered in outlets such as The Boston Globe, The Atlantic, RogerEbert.com, Variety, and Jacobin.

== Education ==
Hansen was born in Portland, Oregon, attended Tigard High School, and graduated from BYU–Hawaii in 2001 with a bachelor's degree in cultural studies and humanities, and an associate degree in theatre. He completed a master’s degree in Visual Media Art at Emerson College in 2004 and returned to earn a Master of Fine Arts in 2011.

== Career ==
=== Early work and The Elders ===
Hansen’s early short documentaries profiled “familiar strangers” in Boston and led to his first feature, The Elders (2013). After a successful Kickstarter campaign, the project received support from Take Action Hollywood!, the nonprofit founded by Maria Menounos, which contributed both funds and in-kind equipment support. Menounos is credited as a producer in the film’s titles. The film premiered at the Independent Film Festival Boston, where The Boston Globe profiled Hansen as “a documentarian ready to learn from his Elders.”

The Elders was later reviewed in the peer-reviewed journal The Gerontologist, which noted its interview-driven approach to portraying later life, and it has also been featured by Terra Nova Films in its “Movies About Aging” review series.

Hansen collaborated as a producer alongside fellow Emerson College MFA colleague Elaine McMillion Sheldon on her project Hollow: An Interactive Documentary, which won a Peabody Award in 2013 and was nominated for a News & Documentary Emmy the following year.

In the health policy space, Hansen created a number of short documentary films for Health Catalyst, investigating innovative health care practices around the world, profiling leaders such as Devi Shetty, Michael Porter, Jeffrey Brenner, Donald Berwick, David Nash (physician), ... Penny Wheeler, and Professor Hartwig Huland.

=== Collaborations with Adam Roffman ===
In 2015 Hansen served as cinematographer and editor on Spearhunter, directed by Adam Roffman and Luke Poling. The film premiered at South by Southwest and was featured in The Atlantic and on RogerEbert.com.

He later worked as cinematographer and editor on All the Presidents’ Heads (2016), which screened at the New Hampshire Film Festival.

In 2017 Hansen collaborated again with Adam Roffman on The Collection, a short documentary about a massive archive of letterpress blocks once used to print film advertisements. The film premiered at South by Southwest and screened at other festivals including the Independent Film Festival Boston. The short was later featured by outlets such as Short of the Week, FirstShowing, and Atlas Obscura. The film also drew the attention of Tim League, founder of Alamo Drafthouse Cinema, who purchased the entire collection and incorporated the blocks into the design of Alamo-affiliated bars in Boston, Manhattan, and Austin.

=== Collaborations with Rebecca Richman Cohen ===
In 2016 Hansen collaborated with filmmaker Rebecca Richman Cohen and her company Racing Horse Productions, along with the Harvard Law School Food Law and Policy Clinic, on Expired? Food Waste in America, a short documentary about food waste and date labels. The film profiled Montana’s restrictive milk sell-by law and was covered by Harvard Law Today, Food Tank, and Perishable News.

He went on to co-produce and edit Cohen’s feature Weed & Wine (2020), which premiered at Hot Docs and screened at DOC NYC, the Napa Valley Film Festival, the Deauville American Film Festival, and the Mill Valley Film Festival’s DocLands section. The film was praised for its structure and editing in Variety and the San Francisco Chronicle.

Since 2015, Hansen has collaborated regularly with Cohen on multiple projects, including the short documentary The Recall: Reframed (2023), which received widespread media coverage and aired on MSNBC and Peacock.

In 2024 Hansen began work on A Second Movement, a portrait of Grammy-nominated violinist Christina Day Martinson. The project was the subject of a Live Music Friday segment on Boston Public Radio (WGBH), where Martinson and Hansen discussed the film. Later that year, GBH Music hosted a recital described as a celebration of Martinson’s career and “the forthcoming documentary A Second Movement". According to the film’s official site, the documentary also features violinists Vera Beths, Johnny Gandelsman, Colin Jacobsen, and conductor Jonathan Cohen.

== Filmography ==
| Year | Title | Role | Notes |
|---|---|---|---|
| 2009 | Thor at the Bus Stop | Actor | Feature film |
| 2010 | Gilbert | Director, producer, cinematographer, editor | Short documentary |
| 2010 | Ron | Director, producer, cinematographer, editor | Short documentary |
| 2010 | Lilah | Director, producer, cinematographer, editor | Short documentary |
| 2010 | Pat | Director, producer, cinematographer, editor | Short documentary |
| 2011 | Jeffrey | Director, producer, cinematographer, editor | Short documentary |
| 2012 | The Elders | Director, producer, cinematographer, editor | Feature documentary; premiered at Independent Film Festival Boston |
| 2013 | Hollow | Producer | Interactive documentary; won a Peabody Award and nominated for a News & Documentary Emmy |
| 2013 | Beyond the Mind | Producer, editor | Feature documentary |
| 2014 | From the Heart | Director, producer, cinematographer, editor | Short documentary |
| 2015 | Spearhunter | Cinematographer, editor | Short documentary; premiered at SXSW and covered by The Atlantic and RogerEbert.com |
| 2015 | Measured Outcomes: A Future View of Value-Based Healthcare | Director, producer, cinematographer, editor | Short documentary |
| 2016 | Expired? Food Waste in America | Producer, cinematographer, editor | Short documentary; screened at food policy events and festivals |
| 2016 | The Story of New Ulm | Director, producer, cinematographer, editor | Short documentary |
| 2016 | All the Presidents’ Heads | Cinematographer, editor | Short documentary |
| 2016 | Untouchable | Additional camera | Feature documentary |
| 2017 | The Collection | Cinematographer, editor | Short documentary; premiered at SXSW, inspired Alamo Drafthouse founder Tim League to acquire the archive featured in the film |
| 2017 | A Coalition of the Willing | Director, producer, cinematographer, editor | Short documentary |
| 2018 | Mrs. Saltzman Goes to Jail | Editor | Short documentary |
| 2020 | Weed & Wine | Co-producer, Editor | Premiered at Hot Docs; screened at DOC NYC, Napa Valley Film Festival, Deauville American Film Festival, and the Mill Valley Film Festival’s DocLands section. |
| 2021 | The X-tet: A Concert Documentary | Producer, director, editor | Feature documentary |
| 2022 | The Recall: Reframed | Producer, cinematographer, additional editing | Short documentary; released on MSNBC/Peacock |
| 2025 | A Second Movement | Director, producer | Feature documentary (forthcoming); discussed on Boston Public Radio and GBH Music |

== Awards ==
- 2013 – Hollow received a Peabody Award and a News & Documentary Emmy nomination.
- 2015 – Spearhunter received multiple festival awards and was selected as a Vimeo Staff Pick.
- 2017 – Expired? Food Waste in America won Best Short Film at the Earth Port Film Festival.
