= Jon Matthews =

American film director (born 1977)

Jon Matthews (born September 1, 1977) is an American film director, writer, producer, and actor. He is best known for his documentary, Surviving Cliffside, which premiered at the 2014 South by Southwest Film Festival, and for "Black Dog, Red Dog" a film he co-directed with James Franco.

== Early life ==
Matthews was born in Alum Creek, West Virginia, and was raised in a Christian household. As a child he wrote and illustrated comic books, creating his own characters and stories.

Matthews attended West Virginia University, and there was exposed to a wide variety of film styles. He studied Sociology and took classes on feminist theory, and race and gender stratification in society. He was active in civil rights groups on campus.

Matthews enrolled in West Virginia University's College of Law in 1999. There he started an American Civil Liberties chapter and re-formed the National Lawyers Guild chapter at the law school. He graduated in 2002.

== Career in law ==
Matthews started a private law practice in West Virginia, focusing on civil rights and consumer law. After a year he was hired as Assistant Attorney General, he worked in the Civil Rights Division, representing victims of housing and employment discrimination.

Four years later Matthews was hired at a private firm, where he continued to do civil rights cases. Also during this time, Matthews became Legal Chair of the American Civil Liberties Union of West Virginia, coordinating their legal docket and litigating cases himself, including a religious discrimination case, where a Mormon student was denied a state-funded scholarship.

Matthews became the Legal Director of the American Civil Liberties Union of Connecticut and went to live in Hartford. He represented the free speech rights of a hunger striker, the religious freedoms of death row inmates, and advocated for same sex marriage and LGBTQ rights.

During this time Matthews also played steel guitar in a country band.

== Film career ==
In 2009 Matthews left his law practice and moved to New York City, where he attended New York University's graduate film program as a Dean's Fellow. In his third year at NYU, Matthews was hired as Spike Lee's assistant. Lee watched the footage for Matthews' thesis documentary and later awarded him a grant to finish the film, Surviving Cliffside. The film premiered at the SXSW Film Festival. It later screened at the West Virginia International Film Festival.

After graduation, Matthews moved to Los Angeles, where he has written several feature films, television pilots, and commercials. In 2013, he and actress Abby Wathen started a kickstarter campaign to raise funds for one of their projects.

During the summer of 2014, Matthews made a commercial for Castrol GTX Motor Oil. He also made a commercial for Chevrolet 4G LTE, which won second place in an international contest sponsored by MoFilm.

In the fall of 2014, Matthews programmed the inaugural Appalachian Queer Film Festival in Lewisburg, West Virginia. The festival, which he co-founded with activist Tim Ward, featured two films from Sundance and the Grand Jury winner from South by Southwest.

In 2015, Matthews began filming a feature film, Khali the Killer.
