= List of films set around Halloween =

This is a list of films set on (i.e. it must be an active plot element, setting, or narrative focus) or around (i.e. the narrative must take place during the Halloween season and explicitly reference or feature the holiday's atmosphere, preparations, or immediate aftermath) Halloween.

== Children's and family ==
- A Cinderella Story (2004)
- A-Haunting We Will Go (1966)
- The Adventures of Ichabod and Mr. Toad (1949)
- The Addams Family (1991)
- Alpha and Omega 4: The Legend of the Saw Tooth Cave (2014)
- Alvin and the Chipmunks Meet Frankenstein (1999)
- Alvin and the Chipmunks Meet the Wolfman (2000)
- All Hallows' Eve (2016)
- A Babysitter's Guide to Monster Hunting (2020)
- The Batman vs. Dracula (2005)
- Batman Unlimited: Monster Mayhem (2015)
- Bewitched (2005)
- Boo to You Too! Winnie the Pooh (1996)
- The Book of Life (2014)
- Bouncing Babies (1929)
- Broom-Stick Bunny (1956)
- Bugs Bunny's Howl-oween Special (1978)
- Can of Worms (1999)
- Coco (2017)
- Corn on the Cop (1965)
- The Curse of Bridge Hollow (2022)
- Diary of a Wimpy Kid (2010)
- The Dog Who Saved Halloween (2011)
- Double, Double, Toil and Trouble (1993)
- Ernest Scared Stupid (1991)
- E.T. the Extra-Terrestrial (1982)
- Explorers (1985)
- The Flintstones Meet Rockula and Frankenstone (1979)
- Frankenweenie (2012)
- Fred 2: Night of the Living Fred (2011)
- Fright to the Finish (1954)
- Garfield's Halloween Adventure (1985)
- Girl vs. Monster (2012)
- Goosebumps 2: Haunted Halloween (2018)
- Grow Up, Tony Phillips (2013)
- Ghost Squad (2015)
- Hallowe'en (1931)
- Halloween Is Grinch Night (1977)
- The Halloween That Almost Wasn't (1979)
- The Halloween Tree (1993)
- Halloween with the New Addams Family (1977)
- The House with a Clock in Its Walls (2018)
- I Downloaded a Ghost (2004)
- Invisible Sister (2015)
- It's the Great Pumpkin, Charlie Brown (1966)
- The Karate Kid (1984)
- Kenny & Company (1976)
- Lemonade Mouth (2011)
- The Legend of Sleepy Hollow (1980)
- Mickey's House of Villains (2002)
- Monster House (2006)
- Monster Island (2017)
- The Monster Squad (1987)
- Monsters vs. Aliens: Mutant Pumpkins from Outer Space (2009)
- Monster Family (2017)
- Muppets Haunted Mansion (2021)
- Night of the Living Carrots (2011)
- The Nightmare Before Christmas (1993)
- Open Season: Scared Silly (2015)
- Pooh's Heffalump Halloween Movie (2005)
- Raggedy Ann and Andy in The Pumpkin Who Couldn't Smile (1979)
- R. L. Stine's Monsterville: Cabinet of Souls (2015)
- R. L. Stine's The Haunting Hour: Don't Think About It (2007)
- Room on the Broom (2012)
- Roxy Hunter and the Horrific Halloween (2008)
- Something Wicked This Way Comes (1983)
- Scared Shrekless (2010)
- Scary Godmother: Halloween Spooktakular (2003)
- Scary Godmother: The Revenge of Jimmy (2005)
- Shaun the Sheep: The Beast of Mossy Bottom (2026)
- The Scream Team (2002)
- The Smurfs: The Legend of Smurfy Hollow (2013)
- Song of the Sea (2014)
- Spaced Invaders (1990)
- Spirit Halloween: The Movie (2022)
- Spookley the Square Pumpkin (2004)
- Spooky House (2002)
- Spooky Buddies (2011)
- Tower of Terror (1997)
- Toy Story of Terror! (2013)
- Trick or Treat (1952)
- Twitches (2005)
- Twitches Too (2007)
- When Good Ghouls Go Bad (2001)
- Witch's Night Out (1978)
- The Worst Witch (1986)

=== Casper franchise ===
- Casper (1995)
- Casper Meets Wendy (1998)
- Casper's Halloween Special (1979)

=== Halloweentown franchise ===
- Halloweentown (1998)
- Halloweentown II: Kalabar's Revenge (2001)
- Halloweentown High (2004)
- Return to Halloweentown (2006)

=== Hocus Pocus franchise ===
- Hocus Pocus (1993)
- Hocus Pocus 2 (2022)

=== Mostly Ghostly franchise ===
- Mostly Ghostly: Who Let the Ghosts Out? (2008)
- Mostly Ghostly: Have You Met My Ghoulfriend? (2014)

=== The Munsters franchise ===
- The Munsters' Revenge (1981)
- Here Come the Munsters (1995)
- The Munsters (2022)

=== Scooby-Doo franchise ===
- Happy Halloween, Scooby-Doo! (2020)
- Trick or Treat Scooby-Doo! (2022)
- Scooby-Doo! and the Goblin King (2008)

=== Under Wraps franchise ===
- Under Wraps (1997)
- Under Wraps (2021)
- Under Wraps 2 (2022)

== Comedy ==
- Arsenic and Old Lace (1944)
- Beetlejuice (1988)
- Beetlejuice Beetlejuice (2024)
- Boo! A Madea Halloween (2016)
- Boo 2! A Madea Halloween (2017)
- Bring It On: Cheer or Die (2022)
- Fanboys (2009)
- Fun Size (2012)
- Gravy (2015)
- The Hollywood Knights (1980)
- Hubie Halloween (2020)
- Idle Hands (1999)
- Little Sister (2016)
- Mean Girls (2004)
- Mean Girls (2024)
- The Midnight Hour (1985)
- Monster Mash (1995)
- Mr. Mom (1983)
- Once Bitten (1985)
- Ring Ring (2019)
- Shriek If You Know What I Did Last Friday the 13th (2000)
- Son of the Mask (2005)
- Stan Helsing (2009)
- Totally Killer (2023)
- Wasabi Tuna (2003)
- When We First Met (2018)

== Horror and thriller ==
- 10/31 (2017)
- 31 (2016)
- Abandoned Mine (2012)
- Babysitter Massacre (2013)
- Bad Apples (2018)
- Bad Candy (2021)
- Bad Reputation (2005)
- The Barn (2016)
- Blood Fest (2018)
- Bloodline Killer (2024)
- Boo (2005)
- Boo! (2018)
- Boys in the Trees (2016)
- Candy Corn (2019)
- Carved (2024)
- The Coven (2015)
- Cemetery of Terror (1985)
- The Child (1977)
- The Clown Murders (1976)
- The Collingswood Story (2006)
- Cobweb (2023)
- Creepshow (1982)
- Cry Wolf (2005)
- Dark Harvest (2023)
- Dark Night of the Scarecrow (1981)
- Demonic Toys (1992)
- Deadly Friend (1986)
- Donnie Darko (2001)
- Evil Breed: The Legend of Samhain (2003)
- The Exorcist (1973)
- Flatliners (1990)
- Flesheater (1988)
- Flick (2008)
- The Funhouse Massacre (2015)
- Ginger Snaps (2000)
- Girls Against Boys (2012)
- Ghostwatch (1992)
- Grave Halloween (2013)
- The Guest (2014)
- Halloween Night (2006)
- Halloweenight (2009)
- Haunt (2019)
- Haunt Season (2024)
- Headless Horseman (2007)
- Hellbent (2004)
- Hell Fest (2018)
- Hell Fire (2012)
- Hell House LLC (2015)
- Hellions (2015)
- Hokum (2026)
- Holidays (segment "Halloween") (2016)
- The Hollow (2004)
- House II: The Second Story (1987)
- House of 1000 Corpses (2003)
- House of Fears (2007)
- The Houses October Built (2014)
- The Houses October Built 2 (2017)
- Hurt (2018)
- I Was a Teenage Werewolf (1957)
- In Search of Lovecraft (2008)
- The Invasion (2007)
- Jack-O (1995)
- The Jester (2023)
- The Kiss (1988)
- Killer Eye: Halloween Haunt (2011)
- Kids vs. Aliens (2022)
- Lady in White (1988)
- Late Night with the Devil (2023)
- The Little Girl Who Lives Down the Lane (1976)
- Livid (2011)
- May (2002)
- Mischief Night (2013; Travis Baker)
- Mischief Night (2013; Richard Schenkman)
- Murder Party (2007)
- Pay the Ghost (2015)
- The People Under the Stairs (1991)
- Pet Sematary Two (1992)
- The Pit (1981)
- The Predator (2018)
- Primal Rage (1988)
- The Prodigy (2019)
- The Pumpkin Karver (2006)
- The Rage: Carrie 2 (1999)
- The Return of Count Yorga (1971)
- The Return of Dracula (1958)
- Return of the Living Dead: Rave to the Grave (2005)
- Satan's Little Helper (2005)
- The Scarehouse (2014)
- Scary Stories to Tell in the Dark (2019)
- Shake, Rattle & Roll: Evil Origins (segment "2025") (2025)
- Silver Bullet (1985)
- Sinister (2012)
- Sleepy Hollow (1999)
- Slugs (1988)
- Scream VI (2023)
- Tales of Halloween (2015)
- Terrifier (2016)
- Terrifier 2 (2022)
- Texas Chainsaw 3D (2013)
- They Live Inside Us (2020)
- The Terror of Hallow's Eve (2017)
- To the Devil a Daughter (1976)
- Trick (2019)
- Trick or Treat (1986)
- Trick or Treat (2019)
- Trick or Treats (1982)
- Trick 'r Treat (2007)
- Truth or Dare (2012)
- Truth or Dare (2017)
- V/H/S (segment "10/31/98") (2012)
- V/H/S/Halloween (2025)
- Volumes of Blood (2015)
- We Need to Talk About Kevin (2011)
- When Michael Calls (1972)
- WNUF Halloween Special (2013)
- Wrong Turn 5: Bloodlines (2012)
- Zombie Town (2023)

=== All Hallows' Eve franchise ===
- All Hallows' Eve (2013)
- All Hallows' Eve 2 (2015)
- All Hallows' Eve: Trickster (2023)
- All Hallows' Eve: Inferno (2024)

=== Halloween franchise ===
- Halloween (1978)
- Halloween II (1981)
- Halloween III: Season of the Witch (1982)
- Halloween 4: The Return of Michael Myers (1988)
- Halloween 5: The Revenge of Michael Myers (1989)
- Halloween: The Curse of Michael Myers (1995)
- Halloween H20: 20 Years Later (1998)
- Halloween: Resurrection (2002)
- Halloween (2007)
- Halloween II (2009)
- Halloween (2018)
- Halloween Kills (2021)
- Halloween Ends (2022)

=== Night of the Demons franchise ===
- Night of the Demons (1988)
- Night of the Demons 2 (1994)
- Night of the Demons 3 (1997)
- Night of the Demons (2009)

== Other ==
- About Last Night (2014)
- A Haunting in Venice (2023)
- Affliction (1997)
- American Splendor (2003)
- The Batman (2022)
- Batman: The Long Halloween (2021)
- Beginners (2010)
- Big Daddy (1999)
- Case Closed: The Bride of Halloween (2022)
- Chemical Hearts (2020)
- Cowboy Bebop: The Movie (2001)
- The Crow (1994)
- Ed Wood (1994)
- Emesis Blue (2023)
- Fried Green Tomatoes (1991)
- Hellboy (2004)
- Highball (1997)
- Higher Learning (1995)
- Holidate (2020)
- Holiday Heart (2000)
- How High (2001)
- In America (2002)
- Ingrid Goes West (2017)
- Ironweed (1987)
- Jack the Bear (1993)
- Jack (1996)
- Jack Reacher: Never Go Back (2016)
- Kotch (1971)
- Kramer vs. Kramer (1979)
- Liberty Heights (1999)
- The Man with a Cloak (1951)
- Marriage Story (2019)
- Meet Me in St. Louis (1944)
- Mermaids (1990)
- Mischief Night (2006)
- Mixed Company (1974)
- Mysterious Skin (2004)
- Nine Months (1995)
- The Night That Panicked America (1975)
- Nightdreams (1981)
- Ordinary People (1980)
- A Perfect World (1993)
- Phoebe in Wonderland (2008)
- Practical Magic (1998)
- Radio Days (1987)
- The Rules of Attraction (2002)
- The Skeleton Twins (2014)
- St. Elmo's Fire (1985)
- Sweet Hearts Dance (1988)
- They Came Together (2014)
- To Kill a Mockingbird (1962)
- Twin Falls Idaho (1999)
- Without a Paddle (2004)

== See also ==
- Bibliography of Halloween
- List of holiday horror films
- List of Halloween television specials
