= List of television shows set in West Virginia =

This list includes shows that were either made in, or had at least one episode take place in, West Virginia or the surrounding area:

== Shows ==
indicates Primetime Emmy Awards recognition

=== Full series ===
Title	First Episode	Final Episode	Location	Note
The Americans	1961	1961	Harper's Ferry, West Virginia	
Hawkins	1973	1974	Beauville, West Virginia	
Mr. Cartoon	1956	1995	Huntington, West Virginia	
Jamie Oliver's Food Revolution	2010	2011	Huntington, West Virginia	
Coal	2011	2011	Westchester, West Virginia	
Hatfields & McCoys	2012	2012		
Buckwild	2013	2013	Charleston, West Virginia	
Appalachian Outlaws	2014	2015		
Outcast	2016	2018	Rome, West Virginia	
Castle Rock	2018	2019	Moundsville, West Virginia	
Clarice	2021	2021	Clay County, West Virginia	
My Brother, My Brother and Me	2010	Present	Huntington, West Virginia	
Barnwood Builders	2013	Present		
Sawbones	2013	Present	Huntington, West Virginia	
The Adventure Zone	2015	Present	Huntington, West Virginia	
MUkraine	2022	Present	Huntington, West Virginia	

=== Individual Episodes ===
Title	Episode	Location	Note
16 and Pregnant	Leah	Elkview, West Virginia	
Ghost Adventures	Moundsville State Prison	Moundsville, West Virginia	
Ghost Hunters	Moundsville State Prison	Moundsville, West Virginia	
Hoarders	Multiple	Multiple	
It's a Man's World	Multiple	Parkersburg, West Virginia & Wheeling, West Virginia	
Mountain Monsters	Multiple	Multiple	
Teen Mom 2	Leah Messer	Elkview, West Virginia	
The Andy Griffith Show	Multiple	Wheeling, West Virginia & Morgantown, West Virginia	
The Men Who Built America	Multiple	Multiple	
The World Wars	Multiple	Martinsburg, West Virginia	
The X-Files	Multiple	Multiple	
Viva La Bam	Multiple	Multiple	
Prison Break	2025 Pilot		

== See also ==
- List of films set in West Virginia
- List of films set in Huntington, West Virginia
- List of songs about West Virginia
