= Curren Sheldon =

American filmmaker

- Occupations: Director, screenwriter, editor, cinematographer, producer
- Years active: 2011–present
- Spouse: Elaine McMillion Sheldon (m. 2013)
- Website: www.currensheldon.com

Curren Sheldon is an American filmmaker, best known for his documentary, Heroin(e) for which he received Academy Award for Best Documentary Short Subject nomination with wife Elaine McMillion Sheldon at the 90th Academy Awards.

== Filmography ==
Year	Title	Role	Note
2017	Heroin(e)	Producer and Director of Photography	
2018	Summer’s End	Co-director and Director of Photography	
2018	Recovery Boys	Producer and Director of Photography	
2019	Coal’s Deadly Dust	Director of Photography	
2020	Meet Salia	Co-director and Director of Photography	
2021	Phoenix Rising	Co-director of Photography	
2022	Best Clowns	Director of Photography and Editor	
2024	King Coal	Director of Photography and Co-Producer	
TBA	Beat Down	Director and Director of Photography	
