= Elgood =

Elgood is a surname. Notable people with the surname include:

- Bernard Elgood, (1922–1997), English first-class cricketer and British Army officer
- Cornelia Elgood (1874–1960), British physician
- Cyril Elgood (1893–1970), British physician
- George Samuel Elgood (1851–1943), English artist and illustrator
- John Hamel Elgood (1909–1998), British ornithologist
- Leonard Alsager Elgood (1892–1987), British army officer

== See also ==
- Elgood, West Virginia
- Elgood's Brewery
