= Bad Candy =

2020 American anthology horror film

- Promotional release poster
- Directed by: Scott B. Hansen; Desiree Connell
- Written by: Scott B. Hansen; Desiree Connell
- Starring: Zach Galligan; Derek Russo; Corey Taylor
- Cinematography: Scott B. Hansen
- Music by: Chris Dudley
- Production companies: Digital Thunderdome; Black Triad Entertainment
- Release dates: October 31, 2020 (Grimmfest); September 10, 2021 (United States)
- Running time: 100 minutes
- Country: United States
- Language: English

Bad Candy is a 2021 American anthology horror film directed by Scott B. Hansen and Desiree Connell. It stars Zach Galligan, Derek Russo, and Corey Taylor.

== Plot ==
Bad Candy follows local Halloween stories of both myth and lessons learned in the community of New Salem. With its annual Psychotronic FM Halloween show, re-enactment radio DJs Chilly Billy and Paul weave the tales of the supernatural of years gone by. In this small town it’s a grimy ending for most, but will a few good souls survive?

== Cast ==
- Zach Galligan as Paul
- Michael Aaron Milligan as Chuck
- Derek Russo as Vince
- Kevin Wayne as Greg
- Kenneth Trujillo as Daryl
- Corey Taylor as Chilly Billy

== Release ==
Bad Candy premiered at the Grimmfest International Festival of Fantastic Film in Manchester, on October 31, 2020. It later screened at the SouthSide Film Festival in Bethlehem, Pennsylvania, in June 2021.

The film is distributed by Dread, and received a limited theatrical release on September 10, 2021. It was released on video-on-demand on September 14, and on Blu-ray on September 28.

== See also ==
- List of films set around Halloween
