= Mark Christopher =

American film director (born 1961)

- Born: July 8, 1961 (age 65); Fort Dodge, Iowa, United States
- Occupations: Film director, screenwriter

Mark Christopher (born July 8, 1961, in Fort Dodge, Iowa) is a screenwriter and director best known for directing and writing 54 (1998).

Within the film community, he is even better known for the success of the director's cut of the film that premiered at the 2015 Berlin International Film Festival. With over 40 minutes of original footage restored to the film that had been cut out of the 1998 version by Miramax's infamous Harvey Weinstein, the director's cut was universally lauded by critics and hailed as a "jubilant resurrection" and "a lost gay classic." The story of the films destruction and resurrection was featured on New York magazine's Vulture.com website. and The Guardian and Elvis Mitchell's interview with Mark Christopher on KCRW's The Treatment.

Christopher has also written and directed television, theatre, the IFC indie comedy hit "Pizza," and several short films, three of which have been theatrically distributed: The Dead Boys Club (1992), an influential short of the New Queer Cinema wave as cited by B. Ruby Rich in her Sight & Sound article that defined the genre; Alkali, Iowa (1995), winner of the Teddy at the Berlin International Film Festival (1996); and Heartland, Strand Releasing (2007). He is also known for his television writing and creation of musical programming, including Real Life: The Musical that premiered on OWN.

== Filmography ==
- Mid-Century Moderns live stage juke box musical, the Coachella Valley's longest running musical comedy (2022–present, Revolution Stage Company, Desert Rose Playhouse, Oscars, Palm Springs) (Writer/Director)
- Berlin TV series (current, Stampede Ventures and Leonine Studios, American/German co-production)(Writer/Creator)
- Mark Christopher Shorts Retrospective collection of short films (2021, Here TV) (Writer/Director)
- Sara feature (2018, Bionaut) (Writer)
- Berlin pilot (2016, Warner Bros) (Writer)
- Cleopatra VII series (2015) (Writer/Creator)
- 8.3 short (2014) (Executive Producer)
- Real Life: The Musical series (2013, OWN/ITV)(Creator, Executive Producer)
- Heartland pilot (2007, Strand Releasing) (Writer/Director)
- Pizza feature (2005, IFC) (Writer/Director)
- 54 feature (1998, Miramax) (Writer/Director)
- Boys Life 6 featured short Heartland (2007, Strand Releasing/2021 Frameline)
- Boys Life 2 featured short film Alkali Iowa (1997, Strand Releasing/2021 Frameline) (writer, director)
- Boys' Shorts: The New Queer Cinema featured short film The Dead Boys' Club (1993, Frameline/2021 Frameline) (Writer/Director)
- The Dead Boys' Club (1992, Frameline) (Writer/Director)
