= Fate of Chris Lively and Wife =

Song performed by Blind Alfred Reed

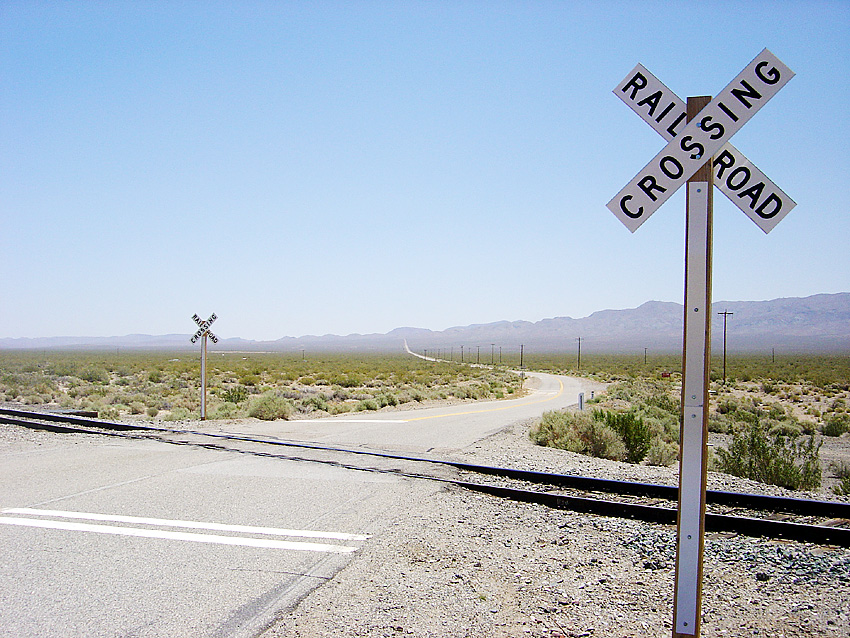
A typical American crossbuck sign marking a level grade crossing

Fate of Chris Lively and Wife is an American folk song recorded by Blind Alfred Reed.

Written in ballad form and performed at a slow and somber tempo, the song tells of the death of Christopher Columbus Lively and his wife Mary Elizabeth Fisher Lively, who were killed on September 2, 1927 when a train collided with their horse and wagon at a railroad crossing near Pax, West Virginia. Lively was born on February 7, 1849, in Town Creek, Fayette County, West Virginia and was 78 years old at the time of the accident. The song concludes with an important message:

Now good people, I hope you take warning,
As you journey along through this life,
Every time when you see “Railroad Crossing,”
Just remember Chris Lively and wife.

The song was recorded on December 19, 1927 in Camden, New Jersey. Blind Alfred Reed sang and played violin, and Orville Reed played guitar. It was released as a 10-inch record Victor 21533. It can also be heard on the album "Complete Recorded Works, 1927-29" by Blind Alfred Reed.
