= The Wreck of the Virginian =

Song performed by Blind Alfred Reed

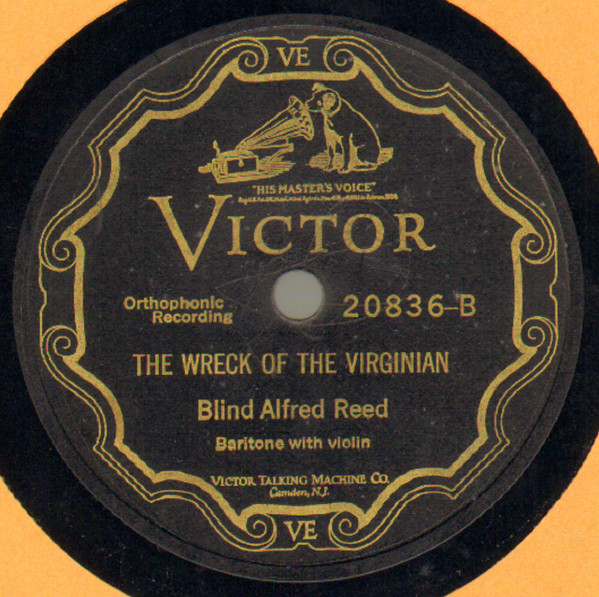

Single by Blind Alfred Reed
- A-side: "Walking In The Way With Jesus"
- Released: September 16, 1927
- Recorded: July 28, 1927
- Genre: American folk song ballad
- Length: 4:24
- Label: Victor
- Songwriter: Blind Alfred Reed

"The Wreck of the Virginian" (Roud 14019) is an American folk song by Blind Alfred Reed recorded on July 28, 1927. The song describes a train wreck in Ingleside, West Virginia. The lyrics, which are essentially documentary, describe how, on "a bright Spring morning on the twenty-fourth of May," 1927, the engineer, E. G. Aldrich of Roanoke, Virginia, known as "Dad," and his fireman, Frank M. O'Neill of Pax, West Virginia, running train number three, "left Roanoke en route for Huntington." Then, "at eleven fifty-two that day, they just left Ingleside," when "an east-bound freight crushed into them." and they were both killed. The song also notes that "Dad" Aldritch had been an engineer on the line since 1906.

The two trains met in a head-on collision. Aldrich and O'Neill were scalded to death by the steam of their locomotive as it crawled up and over the electric locomotive hauling the freight train. None of the cars of either train derailed, but due to the sudden stop, 20 passengers were injured, none of them seriously.

Reed recorded the song on July 28, 1927 in Bristol, Tennessee, for Victor Talking Machine Company producer Ralph Peer as part of the legendary Bristol Sessions.

The song was originally released as Victor 20836 on September 16, 1927. It can also be heard on Reed's album Complete Recorded Works, 1927-29.
