= The Houses October Built 2 =

- Theatrical release poster
- Directed by: Bobby Roe
- Written by: Zack Andrews; Bobby Roe
- Produced by: Zack Andrews; Steven Schneider
- Starring: Brandy Schaefer; Zack Andrews; Bobby Roe; Mikey Roe; Jeff Larson
- Cinematography: Ricardo Sanchez; Andrew Strahorn
- Edited by: Cesar Martinez
- Music by: Steve Yeaman
- Production company: Foreboding Films
- Distributed by: RLJ Entertainment
- Release date: September 22, 2017
- Running time: 101 minutes
- Country: United States
- Language: English

The Houses October Built 2 (titled Hellbent in some countries) is a 2017 American found footage horror film directed by Bobby Roe, who also stars in the film. A sequel to the 2014 film The Houses October Built, its plot follows five characters suffering from trauma a year after the events of the previous film, wherein they were kidnapped and held at a haunted house attraction.

The Houses October Built 2 was written by Bobby Roe and Zack Andrews and was produced by both Zack Andrews and Steven Schneider. The film was released in theaters on September 22, 2017.

== Plot ==
After being rescued from the Blue Skeleton, (Note: as depicted in The Houses October Built (2014)) Zack, Bobby, Mikey, and Jeff work through their trauma by going on another haunted house road trip. Brandy, who sees her therapist Dr. Margee Kerr, is convinced to join after the group agrees not to do extreme haunts. The group visits Anoka, Minnesota, where they are told to find the extreme haunt, "Hellbent."

During their road trip, they see a sign advertising Hellbent. At a haunt, the group sees an actor wearing a Blue Skeleton mask, whom the manager states is not an employee. Brandy initially believes it is a setup, but the group offers her more money to go on Hellbent. The Blue Skeleton sedates the group and takes them to Hellbent, located in the Outer Banks. Brandy wakes up and is led through the haunt by a masked man. She is forced to watch Mikey be immolated, Bobby be waterboarded, and Zach have his arm amputated. When she escapes from the masked man, she finds Jeff, hanged from the ceiling.

Women in porcelain masks lead Brandy to an exit, which ends up being a courtyard surrounded by Blue Skeleton members. They hand Brandy a small coffin with a gun inside. She points the weapon at the men, who remove their masks, revealing themselves to be Bobby, Zack, Mickey, and Jeff. In shock, Brandy uses the gun to seemingly commit suicide.

Previous footage reveals that Brandy had faked her death, as one of the masked women showed Brandy footage of the boys setting up before handing her a prop gun and a fake blood packet. In the present, Brandy rises from the prank. The group discloses that the plan was to help Blue Skeleton go viral. Brandy rises from the ground, shocking the rest of the group, who then disclose that they planned to help Blue Skeleton go viral.

Later, a man in a Blue Skeleton mask is shown rearranging the letters from the sign in Georgia that read "Seek Out Hellbent" to "The Blue Skeleton."

== Cast ==
- Brandy Schaefer as Brandy
- Zack Andrews as Zack
- Bobby Roe as Bobby
- Mikey Roe as Mikey
- Jeff Larson as Jeff
- Andrea Hays as Lily Babs the Bearded Lady

== Music ==
A soundtrack and music video was released for the movie on September 1, 2017, titled The Music October Built. It included a re-imagining of the jazz song "Halloween Spooks" by Lambert, Hendricks & Ross and "Blue Skeleton Man" by Mr. RAY.

== Reception ==
On Rotten Tomatoes, the film has an approval rating of 13% based on 8 reviews, with an average rating of 3.8/10.

Justin Lowe of The Hollywood Reporter found the film lacking saying "Exhibiting all of the same weaknesses as its predecessor, as well as a fatal lack of originality, this iteration will probably mean the nail in the coffin for this smugly self-regarding series, at least on the theatrical circuit." John Squires of Bloody Disgusting found the sequel underwhelming, saying, "The organic charm of The Houses October Built is mostly absent from The Houses October Built 2, which chooses to rehash the storyline from the first film rather than expand upon any of the interesting threads that were laid out in it" and ultimately giving the film two out of five skulls. Rob Hunter of Film School Rejects found that both the first film and the sequel were guilty of "found footage issues that sink most others using the format;" but whereas the original "succeeds anyway thanks to strong chemistry between the friends and some terrifically creepy sequences," the second film "lacks the scares to make them forgivable."

However, Dread Central's Matt Boiselle gave the film four out of five stars, writing: "The cinematography is much more streamlined this go-round, and it's nothing but a fun time to be had, that is until the real chills come rolling in, and it's a wait worth holding out for." M. L. Miller of Ain't It Cool News gave the film a positive review but cautioned, "I think the larger scope kind of hurts the overall story. I liked the twists and turns added, but the finale will piss off some," while ultimately saying, "The sequel is bigger and better...The Houses October Built 2 is a fun follow up that’ll please those attracted to the first film." JoBlo says "Like any good sequel, The Houses October Built 2 takes everything we loved from the first film and expands those elements, while at the same time giving us something bigger, better, and faster this go-around."

== Home media ==
The Houses October Built 2 was released on DVD and Blu-ray on January 2, 2018.

== See also ==
- List of films set around Halloween
