= Blind Alfred Reed =

American Roots protest singer and songwriter during the 1920's

- Born: June 15, 1880; Floyd County, Virginia
- Died: January 17, 1956 (aged 75)
- Instrument: violin
- Years active: 1927-1929

Blind Alfred Reed (June 15, 1880 – January 17, 1956) was an American folk, country, and old-time musician and singer-songwriter. He was one of the artists who recorded at the Bristol Sessions in 1927, alongside more famous names such as Jimmie Rodgers and The Carter Family. He played the fiddle along with his son Arville, who played the guitar. He is perhaps most well known for the songs "The Wreck of the Virginian" and "How Can a Poor Man Stand Such Times and Live?", the latter of which has been covered many times, including versions by Bruce Springsteen, Ry Cooder, and the New Lost City Ramblers.

== Early life ==
Alfred was born completely blind, in Floyd County, Virginia, being the second blind child born to Riley and Charlotte (Akers) Reed. (Note: Tribe, p. 26) He was raised in a very conservative family, the son of a farm laborer, and he acquired a violin at a young age. Later, he began performing at county fairs, in country schoolhouses, for political rallies, and in churches. (Note: Cohen, p. 251.) He even played on street corners for tips. He used to sell out printed copies of his compositions for ten cents each. (Note: Tribe, p. 27) This is about all the information that can be gathered from him in his early life, as most of the events during this time were not written down nor talked about much in his later years.

== Career ==
While playing during a convention in 1927, Ralph Peer, who was the director of the Bristol Sessions, heard Reed playing "The Wreck of the Virginian", and asked him if he wanted to make some recordings. Reed consented, and he recorded four songs, one solo, "The Wreck of the Virginian", and three with Arville's guitar accompaniment: "I Mean to Live for Jesus", "You Must Unload", and "Walking in the Way with Jesus". After the Bristol Sessions, Reed kept recording until 1929, which was the year of his most famous song's release "How Can a Poor Man Stand Such Times and Live?".

After 1929, he stopped recording and lived out the rest of his life mostly in and around Pipestem and Hinton (in Summers County, West Virginia) and Princeton (in Mercer County, West Virginia). Reed continued to perform locally until 1937 when a statute was passed prohibiting blind street musicians. (Note: Tribe, p. 28) In addition to being recording artist and a musician, he also served as a lay preacher Methodist church minister. In 1956, Reed died, supposedly of starvation, although this was denied by his surviving family. He is buried in Elgood, West Virginia.

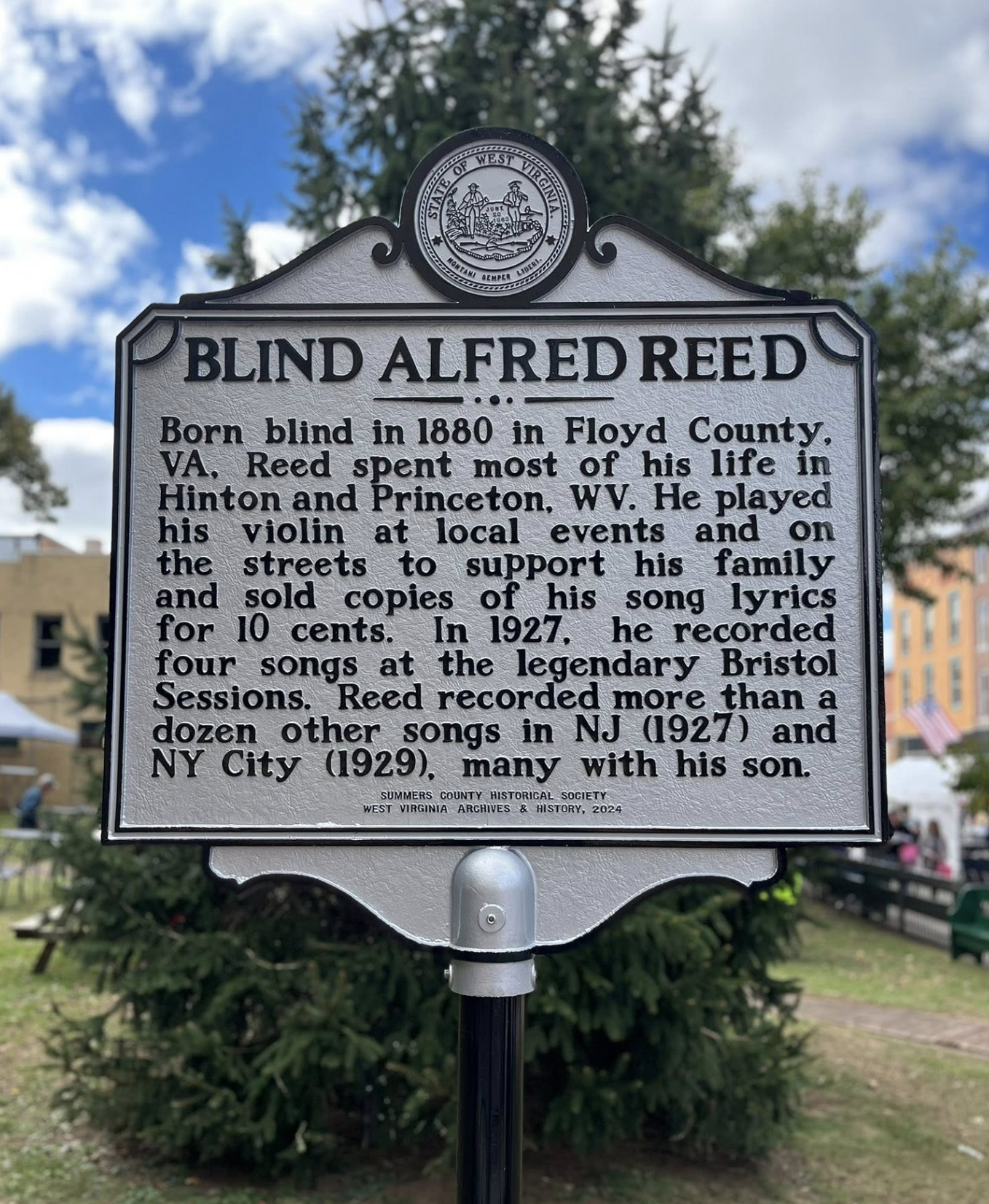
Plaque commemorating Blind Alfred Reed in downtown Hinton, WV

== Legacy ==
Reed's lyrics, all of which he composed himself, were ostensibly very conservative, but always were presented with a sense of humor; for example "Why Do You Bob Your Hair, Girls?" was an over-the-top commentary against women's hair style fashion of the 1920s, in which women who wore a shingle-bob were instructed to "ask Jesus to forgive" their hair style. More than half of the songs he recorded were religious or political or spoke out against society's ills. Because of his social commentary, which was somewhat uncommon then, many people today consider Reed an early "protest" singer.doll

In 2007, Blind Alfred Reed was inducted into the West Virginia Music Hall of Fame, alongside other famous musicians from West Virginia. Also in 2007, a tribute album to Blind Alfred, named for one of his songs, was released. Always Lift Him Up: A Tribute to Blind Alfred Reed features nineteen of Reed's most famous songs, recorded by artists from West Virginia, such as Little Jimmy Dickens, Tim O'Brien and Ann Magnuson.

In 2020, Reed's song "How Can A Poor Man Stand Such Times and Live" was added to the Grammy Hall of Fame.

Blind Alfred Reed has had an impact on many aspects of music. Many of the songs Alfred did record continue to be sung today. Diverse musicians over the years like David Lindley, Ry Cooder, and Bruce Springsteen, roots icons like, Old Crow Medicine Show, The Red Clay Ramblers, and respected acts like Murray Head, Del-Lords, and UB40 have reinterpreted Alfreds songs for new generations

Reed’s songwriting often gave voice to ordinary people, addressing issues such as greed, corruption, and economic hardship. His focus on social issues has drawn comparisons to later protest and folk musicians, including Pete Seeger and Bob Dylan. As a musician in the 1920’s Reeds influence was appreciated by others going through the same hardship as him.

Reed’s songs have also endured through their reinterpretation by traditional musicians. By addressing social issues through a country music style, he brought together traditional musical forms and topical songwriting, helping preserve a repertoire that continues to resonate with later generations of performers.

== Original discography ==
Matrix	Title	Record #	Recording date
39725	"The Wreck of the Virginian"	Victor 20836	July 28, 1927
39726	"I Mean To Live For Jesus"	Victor 20939	July 28, 1927
39727	"You Must Unload"	Victor 20939	July 28, 1927
39728	"Walking In the Way With Jesus"	Victor 20836	July 28, 1927
40790	"Explosion In the Fairmount Mines"	Victor 21191	December 19, 1927
40791	"Fate of Chris Lively and Wife"	Victor 21533	December 19, 1927
40792	"Why Do You Bob Your Hair, Girls?"	Victor 21360	December 19, 1927
40793	"Always Lift Him Up and Never Knock Him Down"	Victor 21360	December 19, 1927
40794	"The Prayer of the Drunkard's Little Girl"	Victor 21191	December 19, 1927
57571	"Woman's Been After Man Ever Since"	Victor V-40196	December 3, 1929
57572	"Why Do You Bob Your Hair, Girls? - No.2"	Victor V-40196	December 3, 1929
57573	"There'll Be No Distinction There"	Victor 23550	December 3, 1929
57574	"We've Just Got To Have 'Em, That's All"	Victor V-40290	December 3, 1929
57575	"Beware"	Victor 23550	December 3, 1929
57576	"The Railroader"	Unissued	December 3, 1929
57742	"The Old Fashioned Cottage"	Victor 23650	December 4, 1929
57743	"How Can A Poor Man Stand Such Times and Live"	Victor V-40236	December 4, 1929
57744	"Black and Blue Blues"	Victor V-40290	December 4, 1929
57745	"Bonnie Little Girl"	Unissued	December 4, 1929
57746	"You'll Miss Me"	Victor 23650	December 4, 1929
57747	"Money Cravin' Folks	Victor V-40236	December 4, 1929

== Discography ==
- How Can A Poor Man Stand Such Times And Live?...The Songs Of Blind Alfred Reed (Rounder Records, 1001, 17981, 1972)
- Complete Recorded Works in Chronological Order (Document DOCD-8022, 2 March 1998)
- Appalachian Visionary (Dust-to-Digital 48, 2016)
