= Walt Craddock =

American baseball player

- Pitcher
- Born: March 25, 1932; Pax, West Virginia, U.S.
- Died: July 6, 1980 (aged 48); Parma Heights, Ohio, U.S.
- Batted: Right Threw: Left

MLB debut
- September 3, 1955, for the Kansas City Athletics

Last MLB appearance
- September 28, 1958, for the Kansas City Athletics

MLB statistics
- Win–loss record: 0–7
- Earned run average: 6.49
- Strikeouts: 39
- Stats at Baseball Reference

Teams
- Kansas City Athletics (1955–1956, 1958)

Walter Anderson Craddock (March 25, 1932 – July 6, 1980) was an American Major League Baseball pitcher. The left-hander, born in Pax, West Virginia, appeared in 29 games for the Kansas City Athletics during the 1955, 1956 and 1958 seasons. He was listed as 5 feet 11 inches (1.80 m) tall and 176 pounds (80 kg).

Craddock attended Syracuse University and signed with the Athletics in 1954. During his three MLB trials, which included five starting pitcher assignments, he lost all seven of his decisions, allowing 68 hits and 40 bases on balls in 61 innings pitched, with 39 strikeouts. In the minor leagues, however, Craddock won 18 games for the 1957 Buffalo Bisons, tied with Humberto Robinson as the International League's winningest pitcher, and was selected to the IL all-star team. He retired in 1960.
