= Priestley, West Virginia =

- Unincorporated community
- Location within West Virginia Location within the United States
- Coordinates: 38°15′37″N 81°50′12″W
- Country: United States
- State: West Virginia
- County: Lincoln
- Elevation: 673 ft (205 m)
- Time zone: UTC-5 (Eastern (EST))
  - Summer (DST): UTC-4 (EDT)
- GNIS feature ID: 1545271

Priestley is an unincorporated community in Lincoln County, West Virginia, United States. It is part of the Alum Creek census-designated place.
