= Jessica Dunphy =

American actress

Jessica Dunphy (born October 23, 1984), also known as Jessica R. Dunphy, is an American actress who has appeared in The Sopranos and the soap opera As the World Turns.

== Biography ==
Originally from Glenside, Pennsylvania, Dunphy was born on October 23, 1984. She was seventeen years old when she joined the cast of the American soap opera, As the World Turns.

Dunphy's most prominent work includes her role as Alison Stewart on the As the World Turns, which she performed from 2002 to 2005, and as Devin Pillsbury on The Sopranos.

Dunphy was succeeded in her As the World Turns role as Alison Stewart by actress Marnie Schulenberg.

She has also appeared in the films Storytelling (2001) and Pizza (2005).

== Filmography ==
=== Film ===
Year	Title	Role	Notes
2001	Storytelling	Cheryl	Segment: "Non-fiction"
2004	Dark Harvest	Alex	
2005	Pizza	Desiree	

=== Television ===
Year	Title	Role	Notes
2002–2004	The Sopranos	Devin Pillsbury	(1) Season 4 Episode 6: "Everybody Hurts" (2002) (2) Season 4 Episode 11: "Calling All Cars" (2002) (3) Season 5 Episode 8: "Marco Polo" (2004) (4) Season 5 Episode 13: "All Due Respect" (2004)
2002–2005	As the World Turns	Alison Stewart	73 episodes
2005	Law & Order: Special Victims Unit	Allison Downey	Season 6 Episode 15: "Hooked"
2008	Life	Mindy	Season 2 Episode 11: "Canyon Flowers"
