= Forks of Coal, West Virginia =

Unincorporated community in West Virginia, United States

- Unincorporated community
- Location within West Virginia and the United States Forks of Coal (the United States)
- Coordinates: 38°16′36″N 81°48′0″W
- Country: United States
- State: West Virginia
- County: Kanawha
- Elevation: 620 ft (190 m)
- Time zone: UTC-5 (Eastern (EST))
  - Summer (DST): UTC-4 (EDT)
- FIPS code: 1554490

Forks of Coal is an unincorporated community in Kanawha County, West Virginia, United States. It is part of the Alum Creek census-designated place.
