= Whatever (1998 film) =

1998 film directed by Susan Skoog

- Directed by: Susan Skoog
- Written by: Susan Skoog
- Starring: Liza Weil; Chad Morgan; Frederic Forrest
- Cinematography: Michael F. Barrow; Michael Mayers
- Edited by: Sandy Gurthrie
- Music by: Walter Salas-Humara
- Production companies: Anyway Productions; Circle Films
- Distributed by: Sony Pictures Classics
- Release date: July 10, 1998 (United States)
- Running time: 112 minutes
- Country: United States
- Language: English
- Budget: $1,000,000 (estimated)

Whatever is a 1998 American independent teen drama film written and directed by Susan Skoog,. The film stars Liza Weil (herself a native of Passaic) in her first major role, along with Chad Morgan and Frederic Forrest.

== Plot ==
In the early 1980s, a high school senior from suburban Northern New Jersey experiences angst about her future and her desire to be an art student at Cooper Union across the Hudson in New York City.

== Production and Release ==
The film was shot on location using Super 16 film in Skoog's hometown of Red Bank, New Jersey for some scenes, along with Cooper Union in New York, with most principal photography occurring in Wheeling, West Virginia. The 16 mm original print was eventually converted to 35 mm film for its theatrical presentation and was released by Sony Pictures Classics on July 10, 1998. After its original 1999 VHS release, the movie did not return to home video until the mid-2010s, when Sony Pictures Home Entertainment released it digitally to online video platforms, along with a limited period on manufacture-on-demand DVD via the Warner Archive.
