= Jule Huffman =

American weatherman, voice-over announcer, director and children's show host

- Born: Julian Robert Huffman; March 31, 1924; Cincinnati, Ohio, U.S.
- Died: April 16, 2015 (aged 91); Huntington, West Virginia, U.S.
- Resting place: White Chapel Memorial Gardens; Barboursville, West Virginia, U.S.
- Occupations: Weatherman; voice-over announcer; director; children's show host
- Years active: 1953–1995
- Spouse: Gladys Kramer (m. 1949; died 2011)
- Children: 4

Julian Robert Huffman (March 31, 1924 – April 16, 2015) was an American weatherman, voice-over announcer, director and children's show host. He was most well known as the host of WSAZ's Mr. Cartoon from 1969 to 1995.

== Early life ==
Jule Huffman was born in Cincinnati, Ohio, on March 31, 1924, to Leroy Huffman and Cecilia Silverman-Huffman.

== Career ==
After his older brother was killed in the war, Huffman served in the US Army Air Corps during World War II. He worked as an aircraft repair and maintenance technician on a carrier in the South Pacific.

Jule was hired by WSAZ in 1953 as a vocalist for the WSAZ variety daytime show Coffee Time. He did commercials, and was a director, a voice-over announcer, and a weatherman. He starred in two kid shows (Steamboat Bill as Merlin the Sea Monster, the early iteration of Mr. Cartoon and "Popeye and His Pals") prior to becoming Mr. Cartoon. He was a weatherman on WSAZ for four decades.

=== Mr. Cartoon ===
Huffman took over the reins of Mr. Cartoon in 1969 after the original actor, George Lewis, left for a job in Maryland. The role made him a beloved and trusted icon in the Tri-State community. He played the role until his retirement in 1995. The series was cancelled after Huffman retired.

== Personal life ==
Huffman married Gladys Kramer in 1949. The couple had 4 children (Nancy, Cindy, Marvin, Julie). They remained married for 62 years, until her death on May 2, 2011, at the age of 84. His son, Marvin Huffman, was one of many performers who wore the Mr. Cartoon character Beeper costume during event appearances.

As a native of Cincinnati, he was an avid Reds and Bengals fan, and sang the National Anthem at several Reds Games, as well as participating in many Red Caravans.

He reportedly loved golf and gardening, and singing, often performing at notable events in West Virginia, Ohio, and Kentucky.

== Death ==
Jule Huffman died in Huntington, West Virginia, on April 16, 2015, at the age of 91. His funeral was held at the First Presbyterian Church in Huntington on April 23, 2015. He is interred near his wife, Gladys, at the White Chapel Memorial Gardens in Barboursville, West Virginia.
