= Circus Farm =

Song by Mind Garage

from the album Early Years
- Released: 2006
- Recorded: 1968
- Studio: Glenn Cambell Studio
- Genre: Rock
- Length: 2:45
- Label: Morning Glori Music
- Songwriter(s): Larry McClurg
- Producer(s): Mind Garage

"Circus Farm" is a rock song that starts out as a soft shuffle, then goes into 2/4 time signature. It was written by Larry McClurg and the Mind Garage while staying at Valley View Farm along the South Branch Potomac River in Romney, West Virginia.

== Different versions ==
Originally the song was recorded in 1968 as a demo in Glenn Cambell Studio in Pittsburgh, Pennsylvania. John Vaughan played lead guitar on a Gibson Firebird electric guitar. Norris Lytton played a 4 string Hagstrom bass. After nearly 40 years, in 2006, that version of Circus Farm was released on a CD titled "Mind Garage Early Years" ( alternately titled "A Total Electric Happening" Morning Glori Music )

Circus Farm 1968 version
Gibson Firebird electric guitar with Soundlab amplifier

A second version was recorded in 1969 for "Mind Garage Again/The Electric Liturgy", RCA Victor LSP-4319 in Nashville at RCA's "Nashville Sound" Studio A, on Music Row. But this time without Vaughan's Firebird electric guitar. Instead Jack Bond, used Chet Atkins' custom Martin acoustic guitar and a Leslie tone cabinet and Lytton used an 8 string Hagstrom bass guitar which produced a dramatic change in the sound. Ted Smith played a Slingerland drum set on the 1968 version and a Premier custom-made chrome drum set with double bass drums on the 1969 versions.

Circus Farm 1969 version
Martin acoustic guitar and Leslie cabinet

== Composition background ==
The upper porch of the house at Valley View Farm overlooks a part of the valley with a wide view of the sky, which inspired the lyrics "Sky of blue May come my way". A circus can be a wild array of noisy disorder. Such is the history of the farm in Romney, West Virginia, and why the song is named "Circus Farm".

Romney was settled in 1725 by British colonial hunters and traders, but by the 1750s the residents were engaged in French and Indian War. In the 1780s, during the American Revolution, former Hessian prisoners built homes there. Valley View Farm itself was built in 1855. In the 1860s during the American Civil War the town changed hands between Confederate and Union armies an amazing 56 times. The lyrics "Living Kingdoms shot the gun, Killing sparrows..." refer to the violent history of the area.

== Personnel ==
- Larry McClurg - lead vocal, backing vocal, lyrics
- John Vaughan - lead guitar
- Jack Bond - keyboard, backing vocal
- Ted Smith - percussion
- Norris Lytton - bass guitar, backing vocal
- Glenn Cambell sound engineer
- Tom Cossie assistant producer

== Goodstock 2007 Music Festival ==
On July 21, 2007 the Mind Garage performed "Circus Farm" at the Goodstock Music Festival promoted by McClurg and Artie Kornfeld ( The Father of Woodstock ). At the festival John Vaughan played lead guitar on the Gibson Firebird for Circus Farm. Kornfeld states he is more excited about Goodstock than Woodstock. Woodstock was a venture, Goodstock is an adventure." Eathmother's Goodstock Story recounts the Spirit of Woodstock at Goodstock 2007.
