= Daniel Boyd (filmmaker) =

American filmmaker (1956–2026)

- Born: September 14, 1956; Martinsburg, West Virginia, U.S.
- Died: February 5, 2026 (aged 69); Charleston, West Virginia, U.S.
- Occupations: Filmmaker, author, professor
- Notable work: Chiller, Carbon
- Website: https://danielboyd.net/

Daniel Ned Boyd (September 14, 1956 – February 5, 2026) was an American filmmaker, author and communications professor. He taught at West Virginia State University, and hosted writing workshops, and received a Fulbright Fellowship in 1998.

Boyd was known for his work with Troma Entertainment directing films such as Chillers, which was primarily funded through state grants. Boyd retired from directing in 2005, and died on February 5, 2026, at the age of 69.

== Bibliography ==
- Death Falcon vs. The Zombie Slug Lords (2008)
- Chillers

- Volume 1, 2012
- Volume 2, 2013

- Carbon (Caliber Comics, 2014)
- Salt (2016)

== Filmography ==
Year	Film	Director	Producer	Writer	Actor	Notes
1987	Chillers	Yes	Yes	Yes	Yes	
1990	Strangest Dreams: Invasion of the Space Preachers	Yes	Yes	Yes	Yes	
2006	Paradise Park	Yes	Yes	Yes	No	
2003	Red Salt & Reynolds	Yes	Yes	No	No	Documentary short
2003	Attrition	No	No	Yes	No	
2005	Ghosts of Green Bottom	Yes	Yes	No	No	TV documentary short
2010	Secrets of the Valley, History of Natue Americans in the Kanawha Valley	No	Yes	No	No	

== Appearances ==
- Rocket Boys Festival
