= Holley Hills Estate =

Historic house in West Virginia, United States

- U.S. National Register of Historic Places
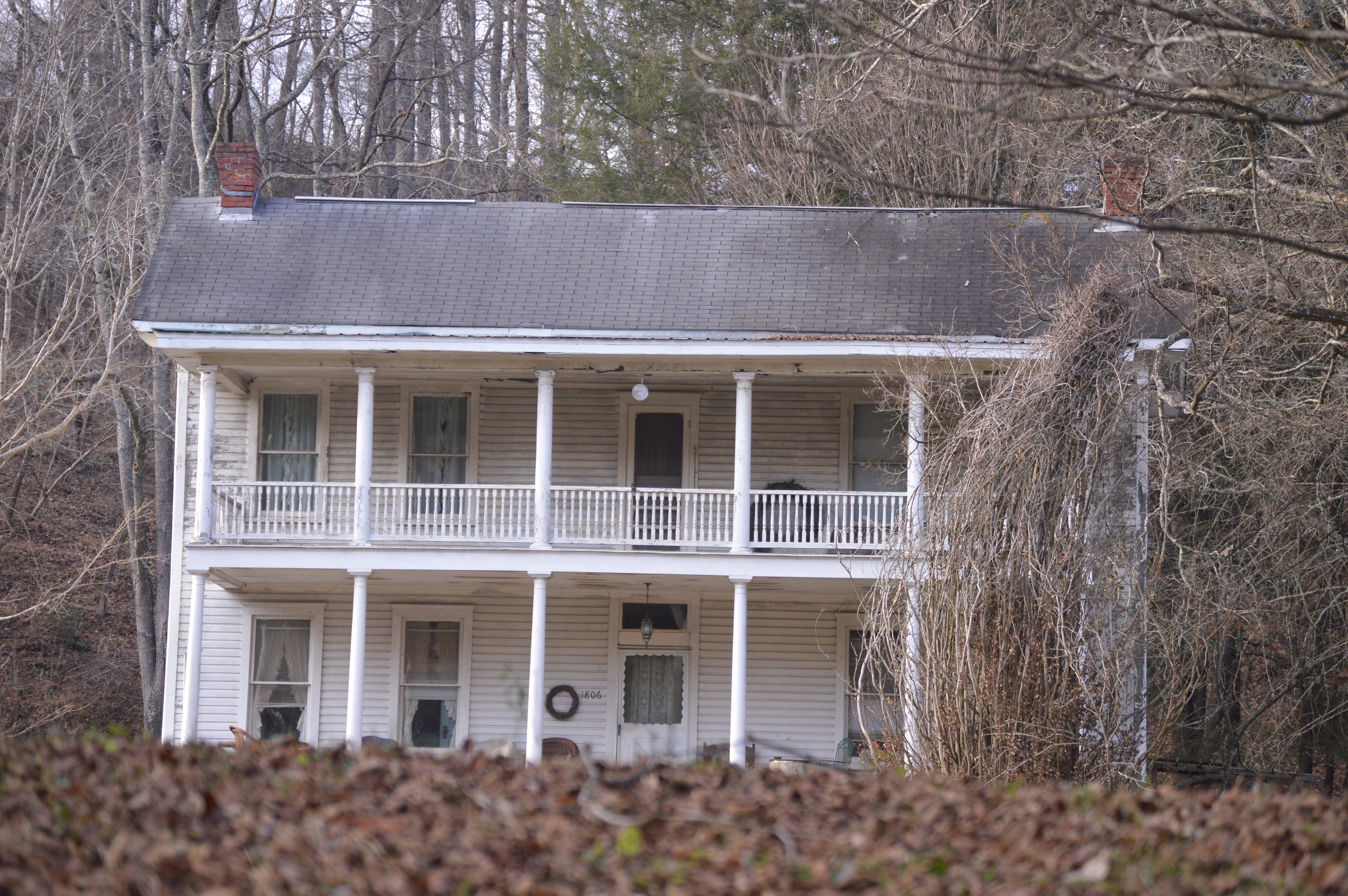
- Front of the house

- Location within West Virginia Location within the United States
- Location: South of Alum Creek on Coal River Rd., near Alum Creek, West Virginia
- Coordinates: 38°14′53″N 81°48′20″W
- Area: 8 acres (3.2 ha)
- Built: c. 1885
- Architectural style: Greek Revival
- NRHP reference No.: 80004029
- Added to NRHP: December 1, 1980

Holley Hills Estate, also known as Holley Hills Farm, is a historic home located near Alum Creek, Lincoln County, West Virginia. The house was built about 1885, and is a two-story, oak-frame ell structure. It features a two-story front porch of five bays, the upper tier of which is enclosed in a balustrade, and topped by a hipped roof. Also on the property, are six contributing buildings, including a tool shed, a two-room cellar-like structure, a grain storage building, and a barn.

It was listed on the National Register of Historic Places in 1980.
