= SouthSide Film Festival =

Film festival in Pennsylvania, United States

Coordinates: 40.6117°N 75.3776°W

- Location: Bethlehem, Pennsylvania
- Founded: 2003; 23 years ago
- Founded by: Jeff Vaclavik, Graham Stanford, Sally Handlon, Rob Dougherty
- Festival date: June
- Website: Official website

The SouthSide Film Festival is an annual non-competitive, not-for-profit film festival that takes place each June in Bethlehem, Pennsylvania. The festival features locally produced as well as international films, guest filmmakers, juried selections, and seminars for filmmakers and fans. The first festival took place in 2004.

The "SouthSide" refers to the area of the city on the south side of the Lehigh River which was home to Bethlehem Steel and underwent redevelopment in the early 2000s.

== History ==
From its inception through 2021, the festival had screened close to 1,600 independent films from 102 countries and 47 states of the U.S. The festival focuses on independent filmmaking and features Invitational Films and Juried Selections, a highlighted genre, and a highlighted cultural region. The annual festival also includes filmmaking workshops to teach techniques and concepts. Teachers have included Mel Halbach and Clayton Farr of FilmTreks, Shanti Thakur of Hofstra University, and Pawel Partyka of Se-ma-for animation studio.

Film screenings take place on the campus of Lehigh University, in alternative venues such as Godfrey Daniels Listening Club and Deja Brew Coffeehouse, in Touchstone Theatre, the Cathedral Church of the Nativity, PBS39, Frank Banko Alehouse Cinema, and the National Museum of Industrial History.

At the 2025 festival, more than 80 independent films were shown in three different locations around Bethlehem, Pennsylvania.

The 2026 festival, from June 10-13, will mark the festival's 22nd year.

It is the longest running film festival in Bethlehem.

=== Logo ===
The festival's logo pays homage to that industrial heritage by including a representation of a blast furnace, still highly visible in Bethlehem.

=== Recognition ===
The SouthSide Film Festival and its host organization, The SouthSide Film Institute, have received grants and awards including a Bethlehem Fine Arts Commission Organization of the Year award which noted "By providing access to independent films for the public, creating a venue for film enthusiasts and filmmakers to come together, and mounting a children's film series, (the SouthSide Film Festival is) developing an appreciation for film as an art form and contributing to a thriving arts scene in Bethlehem that benefits the Lehigh Valley." The festival awards The Linny and Beall Fowler Audience Award that honors the audience’s favorite film.
