= Hollow: An Interactive Documentary =

2013 documentary film

- Directed by: Elaine McMillion Sheldon
- Written by: Elaine McMillion Sheldon; Jeff Soyk
- Produced by: Nathaniel Hansen; Elaine McMillion Sheldon
- Edited by: Sarah Ginsburg; Curren Sheldon; Elaine McMillion Sheldon
- Release date: 2013
- Country: United States
- Language: English

Hollow is a 2013 interactive documentary film that tells the stories of 30 residents in McDowell County, West Virginia, with topics on rural decline, and hope for the future.

== Accolades ==
The film won a Peabody Award, and was nominated for a New Approaches for Documentary Emmy.
