= Recovery Boys =

2018 documentary film

- Directed by: Elaine McMillion Sheldon
- Cinematography: Curren Sheldon
- Distributed by: Netflix
- Release dates: May 1, 2018 (Hot Docs); June 29, 2018 (Netflix)
- Running time: 89 minutes
- Country: United States
- Language: English

Recovery Boys is a 2018 documentary film directed by Elaine McMillion Sheldon. It revolves around four men as they try to reinvent their lives at Jacob's Ladder at Brookside Farm after years of drug abuse.

The film was released by Netflix on June 29, 2018.

== Premise ==
Recovery Boys follows four residents (Jeff, Rush, Adam, and Ryan) during their time at Jacob's Ladder at Brookside Farm. Jacob's Ladder is a long-term residential recovery program for men, situated in a private farming community. The documentary shows the realities of addiction for both the men struggling with addiction and of their relatives.

== Release ==
It was released on June 29, 2018 on Netflix streaming.
