= They Live Inside Us =

American horror anthology film series

- Directed by: Michael Ballif
- Written by: Michael Ballif
- Story by: Michael Ballif; James Morris; Caroman Turner
- Produced by: James Morris; Michael Ballif; Allen Bradford; Jordan Swenson
- Starring: James Morris; Hailey Nebeker, Emily Broschinsky; Stevie Dutson
- Cinematography: Michael Ballif
- Edited by: Michael Ballif
- Music by: Randin Graves
- Production company: Witching Season Films
- Distributed by: Gravitas Ventures
- Release date: October 6, 2020
- Running time: 103 minutes
- Country: United States
- Language: English

They Live Inside Us is an American independent horror film written and directed by Michael Ballif, and produced by Ballif, James Morris, Allen Bradford, and Jordan Swenson. It is an adaptation of episode #4 of The Witching Season anthology series, and once again stars James Morris in the lead role.

== Plot ==
Jake takes his daughter Dani to spend Halloween in the notoriously haunted "Booth House" with the hope of finding inspiration for a new writing project. Shortly after arriving, he realizes the secrets hidden within the house are far more sinister than he ever imagined, and that he is now living his own horror story.

== Cast ==
- James Morris as Jake, Choppy the Clown, the Scarecrow, the Masked Killer, and Count Spookula
- Hailey Nebeker as the Woman in White
- Emily Broschinsky as Dani
- Stevie Dutson as Cynthia
- Tommy Morris as Dennison
- Jack Beck as Scotty
- Allen Bradford as the Sleeping Slob
- Jordan Swenson as The Farmer
- Michael Ballif as the News Anchor
- Emily Ashby as Dolly
- Adam Zeller as Choppy's victim

== Production ==
After the physical release and VOD/online/Physical success of The Witching Season, series creator Michael Ballif decided to adapt the "They Live Inside Us" short-film into a feature-length film. Pre-production lasted well over a year, but after a successful crowdfund in the fall of 2017, the team finalized the cast/crew and prepared to start shooting on a small budget. Production officially began in July 2018 and wrapped in July 2019.

The film was shot entirely on location throughout northern Utah, primarily in historic Nephi, Utah, which is where the film's main location, the Edwin Robert Booth House is located. Several sequences were also shot during the City of Fun Carnival, which was featured in the film The Sandlot. On October 30, 2018, during principal photography, Witching Season Films was announced that they were "hoping to have the film ready to release by Halloween 2019."

== Release ==
They Live Inside Us' was released in the United States and Canada on October 6, 2020, on digital and on-demand cable platforms.

== Reception ==
Upon its release, the film received mixed reviews from critics. Helena Zurc with the Utah Film Festival gave the film high praise, saying "The horror, the intensity, plus the drama seriously oozes intrigue that had me at the edge of my seat until the last minute. Amazing, amazing movie, not just in time for Halloween but recommended all year long!". Dread Central gave the film 3.5 stars and summed up the review as "Sometimes technically flawed and with occasionally lackluster performances, it remains a compelling watch which, for better or worse, relies heavily on its emotional impact to set itself apart from the pack." Michael Pementel writing for Bloody Disgusting gave the film 1.5 stars saying "One will find promising elements throughout the film – interesting ideas that make their way in, but unfortunately are never fully committed to. For as much as it tries, They Live Inside Us fails to convey anything of substance."

== Awards and Accolades ==
The film won the "Best Utah Film" award at the Horrorfest Film Festival (2020) as well as the "Best Halloween Film" at the Halloween International Film Festival (2020). At the 2021 Utah Film Festival and Awards, the film was nominated for Best Feature, Best Director (Michael Ballif), Best Lead Actor (James Morris), Best Actress Under 18 (Emily Broschinsky), Best Supporting Actress (Hailey Nebeker), Best Score (Randin Graves), and took home the award for Best Feature (under $50k budget).

The film was also an official selection at 2021 Filmquest Film Festival (2021) and was nominated for Best Feature Film, Best Actor (James Morris), Best Screenplay, Best Ensemble Cast, Best Cinematography, Best Costumes, Best Makeup, and won the award for Best Musical Score (Composer Randin Graves).
