= Susan Skoog =

American filmmaker (born 1965)

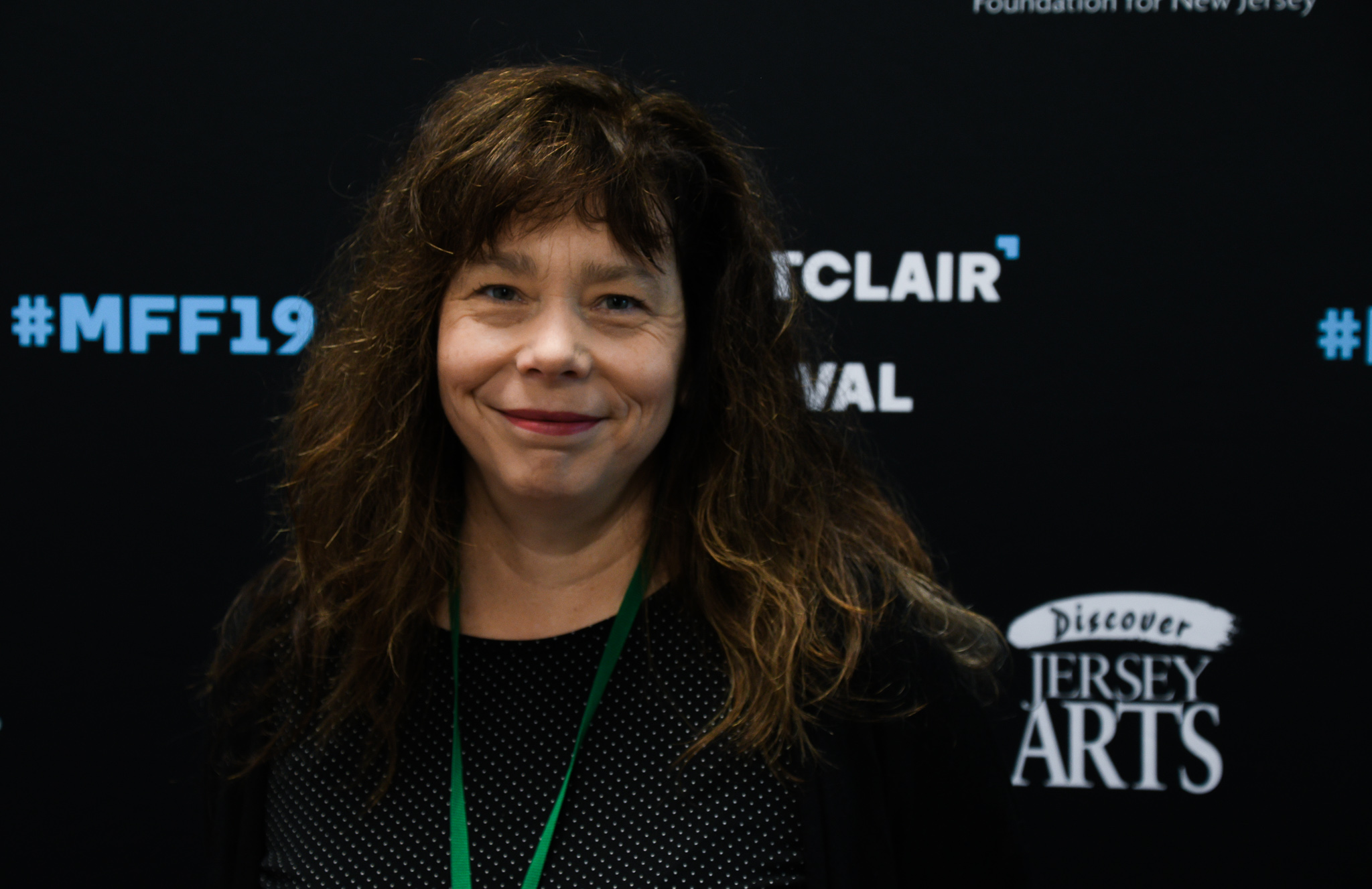
- Skoog at the Montclair Film Festival 2019
- Born: 1965 (age 60–61)
- Occupations: Producer, film director
- Years active: 1990–present

Susan Skoog (born 1965), American filmmaker, is best known for her low-budget debut film Whatever (1998). Asked why she felt the desire to make the film, Skoog explained to IndieWIRE: "I felt like there hadn’t been a film that really nailed what it was like to be a suburban girl growing up in this country." Skoog has expressed repeatedly that the female experience and perspective, has historically been underrepresented in the film industry, but she believes that is changing by way of a "natural progression" toward sex equality.

Skoog was raised in the town of Red Bank, New Jersey, and graduated from NYU in 1987 with a degree in theatre and film. She has cited Mike Leigh and Eric Rohmer as influences on her work.
