= Surviving Cliffside =

- Film poster
- Directed by: Jon Matthews
- Written by: Jon Matthews
- Starring: E.J. Huffman; Brandy Smith; Makala Smith
- Cinematography: Jon Matthews
- Edited by: Jon Matthews; Jennifer Ruff
- Music by: Lillard Anthony
- Production company: Parting Shots Media
- Distributed by: Inception Media
- Release date: April 9, 2014 (SXSW)
- Running time: 66 minutes
- Country: United States
- Language: English

Surviving Cliffside is a 2014 documentary film and the directorial debut of Jon Matthews. The film premiered at the 2014 South by Southwest Film Festival and follows a family that lives in a Cliffside, a trailer park in Alum Creek, West Virginia, known for its crime and drugs. During production, Jon Matthews was mentored by filmmaker Debra Granik (Winter's Bone, Down to the Bone) and filmmaker Spike Lee, who also awarded him a grant to complete the film.

== Synopsis ==
The film follows Matthews's cousin E.J. Huffman, who lives in Cliffside with his fiance Brandy and his two daughters Josey and Makala. The seven-year-old Makala has leukemia and has decided to compete in the Little Miss West Virginia pageant. The documentary approaches the family's everyday life and the emotional and financial challenges they must deal with, as well as their attempts to survive Makala's leukemia and their own difficult situations.

== Cast ==
- E.J. Huffman
- Brandy Smith
- Makala Smith
- Josey Smith
- R.J. Hughes
- Justin Gravely
- Brooklyn Gravely
- Cierra Gravely
- Jon Matthews

== Reception ==
The Hollywood Reporter criticized the film for not being "as enlightening as some similar docs", comparing it negatively to Sean Dunne's Oxyana. PBS shared this sentiment and wrote "I’m not the only one who’s expressed concern about the wisdom of these subjects exposing their lives this much to uninformed viewer voyeurism. While I found much honesty and truth in this story of daily life in a region that has become a national sacrifice area, and am outraged at the way in which casual media stereotyping of the poor seems to justify continued neglect, I don’t know that this film will launch a useful conversation." Conversely, Film Pulse was more positive in their review and wrote that it was "a film that can be sad, frustrating, and uplifting all at once and a great debut from Jon Matthews."
