= Alum Creek, West Virginia =

- Census-designated place
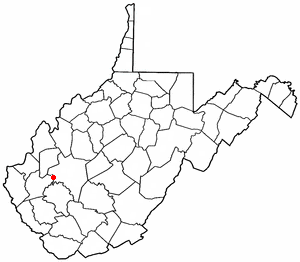
- Location of Alum Creek, West Virginia
- Coordinates: 38°16′45″N 81°49′32″W
- Country: United States
- State: West Virginia
- Counties: Kanawha, Lincoln

Area
  - Total: 10.28 sq mi (26.62 km^{2})
  - Land: 10.21 sq mi (26.44 km^{2})
  - Water: 0.069 sq mi (0.18 km^{2})
- Elevation: 620 ft (189 m)

Population (2020)
  - Total: 1,595
  - Density: 156.2/sq mi (60.33/km^{2})
- Time zone: UTC-5 (Eastern (EST))
  - Summer (DST): UTC-4 (EDT)
- ZIP code: 25003
- Area code: 304
- FIPS code: 54-01396
- GNIS feature ID: 1549563

Alum Creek is a census-designated place (CDP) in Kanawha and Lincoln counties along the Coal River in the U.S. state of West Virginia. It includes the unincorporated communities of Alum Creek, Forks of Coal, and Priestley. The CDP had a population of 1,595 at the 2020 census, down from 1,749 at the 2010 census.

The community was named after nearby Alum Creek, a tributary of the Coal River.

== Geography ==
Alum Creek is primarily in northeastern Lincoln County, with a portion extending across the Coal River into Kanawha County. The center of the CDP, in a rural area between the villages of Alum Creek and Priestley, is at 38°16′45″N 81°49′32″W (38.279034, -81.825657).

According to the United States Census Bureau, the CDP has a total area of 10.3 square miles (26.6 km^{2}), of which 10.2 square miles (26.4 km^{2}) are land and 0.1 square miles (0.2 km^{2}), or 0.69%, are water. Via the Coal River, Alum Creek is part of the Kanawha River watershed.

== Demographics ==
As of the census of 2000, there were 1,839 people, 759 households, and 563 families residing in the CDP. The population density was 107.0 inhabitants per square mile (41.3/km^{2}). There were 837 housing units at an average density of 48.7 per square mile (18.8/km^{2}). The racial makeup of the CDP was 99.18% White, 0.33% African American, and 0.49% from two or more races. Hispanic or Latino of any race were 0.16% of the population.

There were 759 households, out of which 29.4% had children under the age of 18 living with them, 62.3% were married couples living together, 8.2% had a female householder with no husband present, and 25.8% were non-families. 23.3% of all households were made up of individuals, and 11.2% had someone living alone who was 65 years of age or older. The average household size was 2.42 and the average family size was 2.85.

In the CDP, the population was spread out, with 20.8% under the age of 18, 9.4% from 18 to 24, 28.9% from 25 to 44, 27.4% from 45 to 64, and 13.5% who were 65 years of age or older. The median age was 40 years. For every 100 females, there were 92.6 males. For every 100 females age 18 and over, there were 92.3 males.

The median income for a household in the CDP was $40,714, and the median income for a family was $47,195. Males had a median income of $43,233 versus $36,875 for females. The per capita income for the CDP was $24,607. About 13.1% of families and 13.5% of the population were below the poverty line, including 11.3% of those under age 18 and 10.6% of those age 65 or over.

== History ==
The town of Rome was founded at the junction of the Little and Big Coal rivers in the 1890s by the Childress family. Soon the Chesapeake and Ohio Railway built a line along the Coal River to transport coal from the coal fields in Boone and Logan counties into the hub in nearby town of St. Albans. The town grew and a town council was formed. The town officially changed its name to "Alum Creek" in 1910. A constable policed the town, although without a vehicle he relied on the generosity of locals to transport him from place to place. In 1922 a set of bridges was constructed across the Big and Little Coal rivers. It was also at approximately this time Union Carbide built Cliffside, a summer camp on the banks of the Coal River. The town flourished for the next half century with most of its residents working in either the mining industries or in chemicals. Two elementary schools were founded in the town, Alum Creek Elementary on the Kanawha County side and Midway Elementary on the Lincoln County side. A high school was also built in the 1930s, named Washington District High School, after the tax district. WDHS was closed in 1980 due to school consolidation. In the mid-1980s U.S. Route 119 was constructed through Alum Creek and brought a host of businesses into Alum Creek; however, this did not help the town out of poverty due to a decline in the coal mining and chemical industries. The town is seeing a comeback due to the expansion of business along Rt 119. Median income is on the rise, and the town has grown to encompass an area of over 17 miles (27 km).

Holley Hills Estate is a historic home near Alum Creek that was listed on the National Register of Historic Places in 1980.

== Landmarks ==
- Swinging Bridges - First bridges in Alum Creek to span the Coal River, built in 1922 at the Forks of Coal (the confluence of Big Coal and Little Coal Rivers)
- Midway Elementary - Lincoln County elementary school
- Alum Creek Elementary - Kanawha County elementary school
- Washington District High School - Closed school building, standing across the street from Alum Creek Elementary on Brounland Rd.
- Lions Club Park - Community park on Coal River Road
- Forks of Coal Missionary Baptist Church - Founded in 1832, surrounded by historic cemetery

== Popular culture ==
The 2014 film Surviving Cliffside takes place in Alum Creek, West Virginia.
