= Bobby Roe =

American actor

- Born: December 15; Columbia, South Carolina, United States
- Occupations: Actor, Director, Screenwriter, Author

Bobby Roe (born December 15, 1978) is an American actor, director, and screenwriter, primarily known for his film The Houses October Built and its sequel The Houses October Built 2.

== Career ==
He grew up in Dallas, Texas and graduated from Plano Senior High School. Attended UCLA and was an All-American pitcher on their baseball team where he played alongside MLB All Star's Chase Utley, Eric Byrnes and Garrett Atkins. He was then cast as a stunt double for Roger Clemens in Zack Snyder's "Rocket Unit" Cingular commercial. Roe eventually received his masters in film at Loyola Marymount University and went on to be a writer/producer that helped launch Reelz Channel. He was originally cast as Mark Mulder in Moneyball when Steven Soderbergh was directing.

Roe directed, wrote and starred in the film The Houses October Built in 2014, and its sequel The Houses October Built 2. His brother Mikey Roe, Zack Andrews, Jeff Larson, and Brandy Schaefer appear as themselves. Both he and Zack Andrews have also written the children's book Narah and the Unicorn - The Original Narwhal Story.

According to Entertainment Weekly and Variety, Roe will direct and write a segment of the horror anthology, Isolation.

Roe has been tapped to write and direct the shared horror universe film "A Wicked Tale" from the producers of The Walking Dead.

Forbes and UploadVR released that Roe and Andrews, with the help of their company Haunt Society, helped create the first sanctioned virtual reality haunted house for Rec_Room_(video_game).

Bloody Disgusting premiered the video game, Roe wrote and directed, Haunt Society's Nightmare Fuel for Fortnite.

Bloody Disgusting announced his proof of concept film entitled "Will Helm" starring Spencer Charnas of Ice Nine Kills and Mara Marini. World Premiering at Sitges Film Festival and Screamfest Horror Film Festival.

== Filmography ==
Year	Title	Role
2002	Arli$$	Boxer/Weightlifter
2005	CSI: NY	New York Baseball Player
2005	The Longest Yard	Guard Football Player
2004-2005	Clubhouse	Kevin Turek
2006	Superman Returns	Ravens Baseball Player
2005-2006	Numb3rs	Vick Johnston/Flashback Pitcher
2011	The Houses October Built - Documentary	Director-Writer-Himself
2014	The Houses October Built	Director-Writer-Bobby
2017	The Houses October Built 2	Director-Writer-Bobby
2021	Isolation	Director-Writer
2024	Will Helm	Director-Writer-Producer
2027	Untitled Slasher	Director-Writer-Producer
2027	A Wicked Tale	Writer-Producer

=== Awards ===
- Best Feature Length Film from the Midnight X-Treme Category from the Sitges Film Festival (2014, won)
- Best Screenplay Bobby Roe, Zack Andrews, Jason Zada from the Macabre Faire Film Festival (2015, won)

== Bibliography ==
- Narah and the Unicorn: The Original Narwhal Story (2017) Narah and the Unicorn - The Original Narwhal Story
