= Elgood, West Virginia =

Unincorporated community in West Virginia, United States

- Unincorporated community
- Location within the state of West Virginia Elgood, West Virginia (the United States)
- Coordinates: 37°23′58″N 80°55′52″W
- Country: United States
- State: West Virginia
- County: Mercer
- Elevation: 2,815 ft (858 m)
- Time zone: UTC-5 (Eastern (EST))
  - Summer (DST): UTC-4 (EDT)
- Area codes: 304 & 681
- GNIS feature ID: 1549671

Elgood is an unincorporated community in Mercer County, West Virginia, United States. Elgood is 5 miles (8.0 km) east-southeast of Athens.

== History ==
The community's name is an amalgamation of L. Goodwin.
