= Self-Help (film) =

2025 horror film

- Directed by: Erik Bloomquist
- Written by: Erik Bloomquist; Carson Bloomquist
- Edited by: Erik Bloomquist; Carson Bloomquist
- Release dates: June 22, 2025 (Chattanooga Film Festival); October 31, 2025 (United States)
- Running time: 85 minutes
- Country: United States
- Language: English

Self-Help is a 2025 horror-thriller film directed by Erik Bloomquist in which a college student infiltrates a dangerous self-actualization community to rescue her mother from its enigmatic "anti-cult" leader. The film was distributed by Cineverse and its horror label Bloody Disgusting following a Halloween theatrical debut.

== Production ==
The film was shot throughout West Virginia, with the majority of the film taking place in Huntington, West Virginia.
