= The Houses October Built =

The Houses October Built (2014)
- Promotional release poster
- Directed by: Bobby Roe
- Written by: Zack Andrews; Bobby Roe; Jason Zada
- Story by: Bobby Roe; Zack Andrews; Jeff Larson
- Produced by: Zack Andrews; Steven Schneider
- Starring: Brandy Schaefer; Zack Andrews; Bobby Roe; Mikey Roe; Jeff Larson
- Cinematography: Andrew Strahorn
- Edited by: Jeff Hall; Cesar Martinez
- Music by: Mark Binder
- Production companies: Room 101, Inc. Foreboding Films
- Distributed by: Image Entertainment; RLJ Entertainment
- Release date: October 10, 2014
- Running time: 91 minutes
- Country: United States
- Language: English

The Houses October Built is a 2014 American found footage horror film and the directorial debut of Bobby Roe. It was produced by Zack Andrews and Steven Schneider. Roe and Andrews both star in the film alongside Brandy Schaefer, Mikey Roe, and Jeff Larson. The film's plot follows five friends who set out on a road trip in search of haunted house attractions, and find themselves targeted by a mysterious and disturbed group.

It is a recreation of Bobby's earlier film, The Houses October Built, created in 2011. This later version stars many of the same cast and characters, has a similar plot, and even reuses footage from the original. It is not, however, a sequel but a standalone recreation.

Filming for The Houses October Built partially took place at several haunted house attractions, which Roe would later include in a list of "America's Scariest Haunted Houses" that he released as marketing material for the film. The film was given a limited theatrical release on October 10, 2014, and was released to home video on January 6, 2015.

A sequel, The Houses October Built 2, also directed by Roe and reprising some of the original cast, was released in September 2017.

== Plot ==
The film begins in medias res to a dazed and bloodied Brandy being put in a trunk and driven off. Days earlier, a group of friends from Ohio—Brandy, her boyfriend Zack, cameraman Jeff, Bobby, and Mikey—decide to take a trip to visit some of America's scariest haunted house attractions in the days leading up to Halloween. They plan to record their experiences and interview the actors who work there. This leads to disturbing revelations about the establishments' operations, such as failure to perform background checks, utilizing criminals and disturbed individuals as actors, using real corpses as props, and performing dangerous stunts for the sake of scares.

The group begins with well-known haunted houses first, though their main goal is to locate an extreme haunt called "Blue Skeleton," a mysterious group that moves to a different, secret location every year and is said to employ real torture to elicit scares. Zack grows agitated with what he views as pedestrian scares. The group also antagonizes haunted house staff by filming and being disruptive but the staff's animosity grows sinister when the friends are followed by a clown and a young actress from an earlier house, despite the group's having traveled over a hundred miles.

Jeff is chased by a man in a bunny costume brandishing an axe though the man turns out to be an actor. Zack meets other guests who inform him that they experienced Blue Skeleton and that it is in Louisiana this year; they also tell him of a bar where they can find a man who can take them there. Later that night, an actor breaks into their van and films the group while they sleep. Bobby finds the video uploaded to haunted house forums but Zack tells him to keep it a secret, as he does not want the rest of the group getting cold feet. A cow heart is also left inside their refrigerator, making Brandy and Bobby grow reluctant to continue.

At the bar, the group finds themselves surrounded by actors and are confronted about filming. While Brandy is in the bathroom, two male actors take the camera and film themselves cornering her; she escapes and informs the group. They confront the two and reclaim the camera. That night, the group finds their RV surrounded by dozens of actors; one of them cuts the lights. After getting the lights back on, the actors are gone. The next morning, they find instructions on how to meet with their connection to Blue Skeleton.

The group arrives at the rendezvous point at a Halloween festival. In the commotion, Jeff is lured to an alley and finds himself cornered by the clown, the young actress, and the actor in the bunny suit. The masked group attacks and abducts him. The rest of the group tries to call him, but only get a message of another location. There, they are approached by a bus and receive a text telling them to leave the RV or else Jeff will be killed. Zack complies, while the rest of the group is dragged out by attackers. The friends are hooded and bound before being driven off in the bus. While the rest of the group panics, Zack insists it is part of the Blue Skeleton experience.

The men are dragged out at one location, while Brandy is driven to a second location. She is given a camera and told to film everything she sees. The group members wander through their respective rooms. Zack, in a dark room, is bludgeoned by an actor. The rest of the group is terrorized before being buried alive in coffins by the Blue Skeleton members.

== Cast ==
- Brandy Schaefer as Brandy
- Zack Andrews as Zack
- Bobby Roe as Bobby
- Mikey Roe as Mikey
- Jeff Larson as Jeff
- Chloë-Charlotte Alexandra Crampton as Porcelain
- Angelica Leigh Van Horn as Porcelain
- Kahl Brice as Head Clown
- Donald Dantzler as Campfire Man
- Ian Roberts as Feaster Bunny
- Jim Tavaré as Splitz
- Robert Benjamin as Off Duty Clown

== Release ==
The film premiered in the United States at the Telluride Horror Show, and became the first movie to sell out the Sheridan Opera House. The UK premiere was held at The Edinburgh International Film Festival on June 27, 2015.

== Reception ==
The Houses October Built has an approval rating of 60% on review aggregation website Rotten Tomatoes, with an average rating of 5.65/10, based on 15 reviews.

Steve Barton of Dread Central wrote that "The film's characters are ridiculously natural, and their relationships and reactions are both fun and frightening." Bloody Disgusting Editor-in-Chief John Squires wrote that "Every once in a while, an exceptional found footage movie comes along that reminds us that the cinematic ‘gimmick’ can be really effective, when properly executed. And The Houses October Built is that movie." Martin Tsai of the Los Angeles Times wrote that "The Houses October Built proves one of the more successful attempts at the found-footage horror flick."

Criticism typically centered upon the film's pacing and what the critics saw as an overly predictable storyline. Kalyn Corrigan of Shock Till You Drop stated that "It's unfortunate that the documentary aspect of this film wasn't pursued more, because it certainly would have stood out against the modern day repetitive slasher that's recycled every Halloween season. The Houses October Built offered a few uneasy moments and temporarily tackled some tough subjects about the operation of haunted houses, but ultimately failed to answer any of the questions it asked, or commit to one style of filmmaking."

=== Awards ===
- Best Feature Length Film from the Midnight X-Treme Category from the Sitges Film Festival (2014, won)
- Best Actress Brandy Schaefer, Best Feature Poster, Best Screenplay Bobby Roe, Zack Andrews, Jason Zada from the Macabre Faire Film Festival (2015, won)

== See also ==
- List of films set around Halloween
