= Mr. Cartoon =

American children's TV series (1956–1995)

- Presented by: George Lewis (1956–1969); Jule Huffman (1969–1995); Bob Brunner (guest host)
- Country of origin: United States
- Original language: English

Production
- Running time: 60 minutes

Original release
- Network: WSAZ-TV, Huntington, West Virginia
- Release: 1959 – March 25, 1995

Mr. Cartoon, originally titled Steamboat Bill, was a television program for children that aired for nearly 36 years on WSAZ-TV, the NBC affiliate in Huntington, West Virginia. The show was hosted by George Lewis until 1969 and by Jule Huffman until 1995. The show ended its run in March 1995; Huffman remained with WSAZ as a weatherman for another three months, ending his career in June of that year.

== Original format – Steamboat Bill ==
Originally premiering in 1959, Steamboat Bill starred George Lewis as the title character, a friendly character who captained a steamboat called the Television Queen. Accompanying him often was his friend Merlin the Sea Monster, a mischievous, easily frightened, child-like character played by Jule Huffman. Steamboat Bill was often a father figure to Merlin.

Each episode consisted of live-action segments involving Steamboat Bill and his various adventures, interspersed with several cartoons. In keeping with the nautical theme of the show, Popeye cartoons were prominently featured and advertised. Although Steamboat Bill primarily operated the Television Queen, a recurring theme of the show was that he had access to many modes of transportation; he had a rocket ship for traveling to the moon, and sometimes used a time machine to visit different years. The storylines for the live-action segments often spanned multiple episodes, sometimes even weeks.

In 1962, a change in WSAZ ownership necessitated a significant change to the series. The steamboat had been used as a logo for WSAZ itself for many years. Following the ownership change, the new station management ordered that all traces of the steamboat had to be removed from WSAZ, including Steamboat Bill. The August 3, 1962 episode of Steamboat Bill ended with Steamboat Bill learning that he was losing the Television Queen. That day's episode ended with a shot of Steamboat Bill somberly walking to the Ohio River, removing his captain's hat, and placing it in the water, letting it float away.

== Second format – Mr. Cartoon hosted by George Lewis ==
The following episode, on Monday, August 6, opened with Steamboat Bill wandering around, looking for something to do now that he no longer had his steamboat. He found a place called Elmer's Grocery Store, walked inside, and found that Elmer wasn't there. (Lewis later cited two sources of inspiration, from old-time radio shows: Duffy's Tavern, where, likewise, Duffy was never there; and Lum and Abner, where customers shopped at the Jot 'Em Down Store.)

Steamboat Bill decided to stay in Elmer's Grocery Store and changed his name to Mr. Cartoon; with the new name came a new look for the character. Mr. Cartoon wore colorful suits, sunglasses, and a hat—usually a bowler or fedora. The storylines now revolved around Mr. Cartoon and the happenings at Elmer's Grocery Store. Beginning in 1968, Mr. Cartoon was generally accompanied by one of Hanna-Barbera's Banana Splits, who appeared on WSAZ-TV as part of NBC's Saturday morning children's programming.

George Lewis left the program in 1969 and relocated to Baltimore where he helped launch a new independent television station, WBFF, in 1971. At WBFF Lewis became the host of Captain Chesapeake, a show substantially similar to the Steamboat Bill format. Lewis even took the Merlin costume to his new show, renaming the character Mondy. When Lewis departed from WSAZ, he personally chose Huffman to replace him as Mr. Cartoon.

== Third format – Mr. Cartoon hosted by Jule Huffman ==
When Jule Huffman became Mr. Cartoon, he retained the look originated by Lewis—the hat, sunglasses, and colorful suits—but given control over the content of the show, he significantly altered the format. Elmer's Grocery Store and the storylines in each episode were discarded.

Mr. Cartoon was now joined in the studio by a live audience of local children, and the host segments consisted of Mr. Cartoon interacting with them. Sometimes they would play small games with basic props, like rubber bands, with Mr. Cartoon explaining how to play the game. Mr. Cartoon would also simply talk to the audience sometimes, or lead them in songs and dances. Mr. Cartoon would also have the kids cue the start of each cartoon by taking several deep breaths and holding them until he signaled them to yell, "1-2-3 Roll'em!"

A daily feature of the show was "Yucket Bucket," in which three children attempted to answer riddles (usually mailed into the show by home viewers) with Mr. Cartoon dousing them with confetti from a bucket if they failed. Later in the series, Mr. Cartoon would simply warn the children that if they failed, they would be turned green by the Yucket Bucket, but the kids didn’t suffer any actual consequences for failing.

In 1974, the Banana Splits stopped appearing on the show. Mr. Cartoon now had a new animaloid sidekick, originally named Friend. Friend was a large, green, furry dog-like creature who never spoke or made a sound himself, but communicated by honking a bicycle horn. Friend was quickly renamed Beeper, the winning entry in a contest in which kids suggested names for the creature. Beeper's look was created by altering and combining pieces of the various Banana Splits costumes, which the station never returned to Hanna-Barbera.

Beeper usually engaged in slapstick bits; he and Mr. Cartoon would clumsily run into each other or chase each other around the set, and Beeper would often climb or crawl on the children seated on the set. A recurring joke was that Mr. Cartoon was fixated with the neatness of Beeper's fur, warning him not to muss it, and Beeper would run his fingers through his fur to muss it when Mr. Cartoon wasn't looking. Beeper's favorite food was peanut butter & jelly sandwiches, with Mr. Cartoon voicing his exasperation that it was the only thing Beeper ever wanted to eat.

Beeper was originally played by Steve Grzyb, but the character would be played by countless employees of WSAZ over the years; essentially, every entry-level employee was pressed into service at some point. Among the most frequent Beeper performers were J.C. Leake, Jim Backus, and Dave Kinder. Various members of Huffman's own family also stepped in to play Beeper, with Huffman's grandson being the final regular Beeper on the series.

On the episode that aired December 22, 1990, a nearly-identical second creature was introduced: Beeper's sister, Beepette. Beeper continued to appear regularly for the remainder of the series, but Beepette appeared only sporadically.

At the end of each episode, Mr. Cartoon would sign off with a rapid-fire series of instructions for children: "Brush your teeth after every meal, if possible. Say your prayers before you go to sleep at night. Remember the magic words--'please,' 'thank you,' 'you're welcome,' 'excuse me,' and 'I'm sorry.' Be courteous to your grown-ups, say 'yes ma'am,' 'no, ma'am,' 'yes sir,' 'no sir.'" On Friday episodes (and on every episode when the show moved to Saturday) he would expand on these instructions by saying, "It's the weekend, so be sure to go to the church or synagogue of your choice, and bring your grown-ups with you."

== Production ==
Most episodes of Mr. Cartoon emanated from the studios of WSAZ in Huntington, West Virginia. For much of Huffman's tenure, the show's set was bleachers or benches for children against a backdrop mural of cartoon characters, mostly those from Popeye and Looney Tunes. Special episodes were occasionally done at WSAZ's Charleston, West Virginia studio or on location in area shopping malls or at large local events, like the annual Sternwheel Regatta in Charleston and the Tri-State Fair and Regatta in Huntington; Ashland, Kentucky and Ironton, Ohio.

Occasionally, in Huffman's absence, other WSAZ-TV personalities would guest-host the show. Anchor/reporter Bob Brunner stepped in on at least one occasion, introducing himself to the children as "Mr. Cartoon's younger and better-looking brother."

Over the years, the show's running time changed quite often. It was 60 minutes long for most of its run, although several times, it was reduced to 30 minutes to make room for a syndicated show at 4:30. At other times during the show's long run, it would technically be a 60-minute show, but the entire second half-hour would be another show, which would be presented as if it was a portion of Mr. Cartoon. For example, beginning in 1988, the entire second half-hour of the show was an episode of the syndicated version of the kids' game show Double Dare, with Double Dare being introduced by Mr. Cartoon, and the audience yelling "1-2-3 Roll'em!" to start each episode; Mr. Cartoon would return to sign off after Double Dare ended. For a very brief period in 1988, the second half of the show was the syndicated version of the kids' game show Finders Keepers, presented the same way within Mr. Cartoon. He-Man and the Masters of the Universe and She-Ra: Princess of Power were also presented in a similar manner within the second half of the Mr. Cartoon.

After 1988, in order to accommodate The Oprah Winfrey Show, Mr. Cartoon was moved to once a week on Saturday mornings. The show's format returned to Looney Tunes and Popeye cartoons with host segments for the full hour, and this format remained until the end of the series.

By 1984, the show's theme music was a sped-up version of "Broddy Bounce" by Captain & Tennille. In 1988, in keeping with the format change that year, the show began using the theme music from Double Dare as its own main theme. After the show moved to Saturdays, a piece of stock music was used as the theme.

Although Jule Huffman made an effort to instill manners and good behavior with his instructions at the end of each episode, he was actually adamant that the content of the show should not be educational. Because of the 4 p.m. time slot, Huffman reasoned that most of his audience had just finished spending 6 hours or more at school, and he felt that the job of the show was to give them a break, not try to educate them more. When Huffman elected to retire in 1995 (at age 70), WSAZ opted to end production and air a syndicated educational show instead of finding a new Mr. Cartoon. Huffman blamed the demise of the show on the FCC's then-recent rule changes demanding more educational children's programming from local commercial stations, with WSAZ's program director telling the Associated Press that under the new FCC guidelines, it made more sense for the station to air a syndicated show that fit the guidelines than to try to continue production for The Mr. Cartoon Show. Although he would have retired anyway, Huffman made it clear that he resented these policy changes, insisting that television could not adequately teach subjects like science and math to an audience that would be instantly repelled if they sensed that a show was trying to teach them something.

== Legacy ==
WSAZ brought back Beeper as a mascot. From 2009 to 2013, during winter months a graphic of Beeper appears on screen when school closing and delay announcements are made.

A documentary about Huffman's life, titled Hey Cartooners!, produced by C.S. Barnhart, premiered on West Virginia Public Broadcasting in 2024.
