= Elaine McMillion Sheldon =

American documentary filmmaker

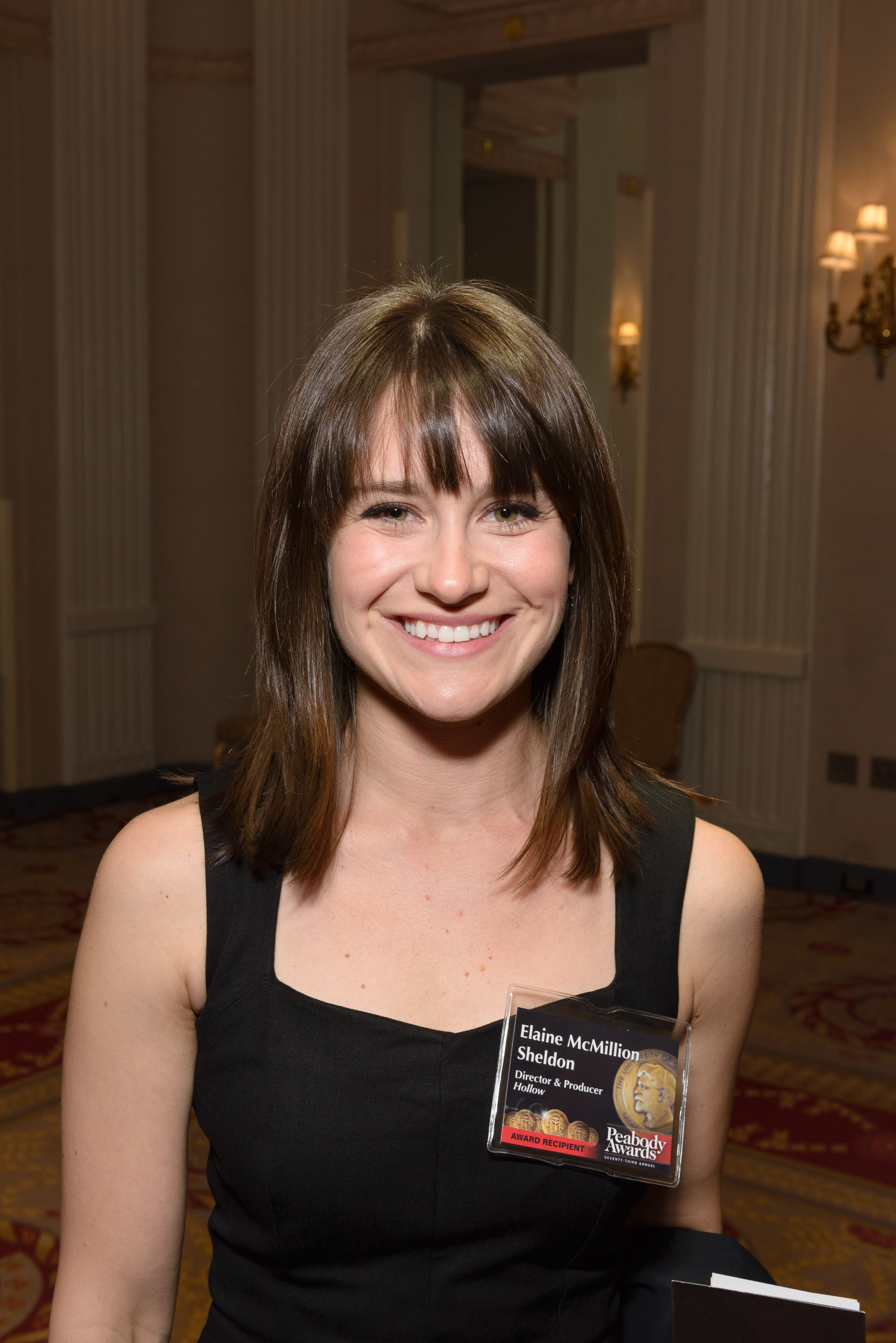
- Born: Logan County, West Virginia
- Education: West Virginia University (BS); Emerson College (MFA)
- Occupations: Director, screenwriter, editor, cinematographer, producer
- Years active: 2011–present
- Spouse: Kerrin Sheldon (m. 2013)
- Website: www.elainemcmillionsheldon.com

Elaine McMillion Sheldon is an American documentary filmmaker, best known for her documentary, Heroin(e) for which she received Academy Award for Best Documentary Short Subject nomination with husband Kerrin Sheldon at the 90th Academy Awards. Her production company is Requisite Media.

== Filmography ==
Year	Film	Type	Note
2023	King Coal	Documentary	
2019	Tutwiler	Documentary	
2018	Recovery Boys	Documentary	
2017	Waking the Sleeping Giant: The Making of a Political Revolution	Documentary	Camera operator
2017	11/8/16	Documentary	
2017	Heroin(e)	Documentary short	
2017	Timberline	Short	
2017	Betting on Trump: Coal	Documentary short	
2015	Forager	Documentary short	
2013	For Seamus	Documentary short	
2013	Hollow: An Interactive Documentary	Documentary	
2012	The Lower 9: A Story of Home	Documentary	
2011	Lincoln County Massacre	Documentary	
