= Dark Harvest (2004 film) =

- DVD Cover
- Directed by: Paul Moore
- Written by: Paul Moore
- Starring: Don Digiulio; Jessica Dunphy
- Distributed by: Lions Gate Entertainment
- Release date: 2004
- Running time: 88 min.
- Language: English

Dark Harvest is a 2004 American slasher film, written and directed by Paul Moore.

== Plot ==
The movie takes place in the summer of 2002 when Sean (Don Digiulio) inherits a farmhouse from his father. Sean was adopted at birth and until that point had no idea about his family. He and a group of friends decide to stay in the farmhouse located in West Virginia for a few days. When they arrive, they're attacked by three killer scarecrows.

== Main cast ==
Actor	Role
Don Digiulio	Sean
Jeanie Cheek	Darcy
Jennifer Leigh	Angela
B.W. York	Bryan
Amiee Cox	Alex
Jessica Dunphy	Jessica

== Production and release ==
The film, which was released directly to video, was shot with a low budget and in only two and a half weeks. It was followed by two unrelated sequels, Dark Harvest II: The Maize and The Maize 2: Forever Yours.

The film was mostly shot in Huntington, West Virginia.
