= Pax, West Virginia =

- Town
- Location of Pax in Fayette County, West Virginia.
- Coordinates: 37°54′40″N 81°15′55″W
- Country: United States
- State: West Virginia
- County: Fayette

Area
  - Total: 0.30 sq mi (0.78 km^{2})
  - Land: 0.30 sq mi (0.78 km^{2})
  - Water: 0 sq mi (0.00 km^{2})
- Elevation: 1,644 ft (501 m)

Population (2020)
  - Total: 136
  - Density: 506.8/sq mi (195.68/km^{2})
- Time zone: UTC-5 (Eastern (EST))
  - Summer (DST): UTC-4 (EDT)
- ZIP code: 25904
- Area code: 304
- FIPS code: 54-62356
- GNIS feature ID: 1555318
- Website: paxwv.org

Pax is a town in Fayette County, West Virginia, United States. The current mayor of Pax is William Hughes. The population was 136 at the 2020 census.

The community most likely derives its name from nearby Packs Branch creek.

== Geography ==
According to the United States Census Bureau, the town has a total area of 0.30 square miles (0.78 km^{2}), all land.

== Demographics ==
Historical population
Census	Pop.	Note	%±
1930	608		—
1940	631		3.8%
1950	561		−11.1%
1960	408		−27.3%
1970	288		−29.4%
1980	274		−4.9%
1990	167		−39.1%
2000	174		4.2%
2010	167		−4.0%
2020	136		−18.6%
U.S. Decennial Census

=== 2010 census ===
At the 2010 census there were 167 people, 78 households, and 45 families living in the town. The population density was 556.7 inhabitants per square mile (214.9/km^{2}). There were 102 housing units at an average density of 340.0 per square mile (131.3/km^{2}). The racial makeup of the town was 100.0% White. Hispanic or Latino of any race were 1.2%.

Of the 78 households 25.6% had children under the age of 18 living with them, 38.5% were married couples living together, 12.8% had a female householder with no husband present, 6.4% had a male householder with no wife present, and 42.3% were non-families. 34.6% of households were one person and 17.9% were one person aged 65 or older. The average household size was 2.14 and the average family size was 2.73.

The median age in the town was 41.8 years. 18.6% of residents were under the age of 18; 11.4% were between the ages of 18 and 24; 25.2% were from 25 to 44; 25.2% were from 45 to 64; and 19.8% were 65 or older. The gender makeup of the town was 49.7% male and 50.3% female.

=== 2000 census ===
At the 2000 census there were 199 people, 81 households, and 49 families living in the town. The population density was 551.5 inhabitants per square mile (209.9/km^{2}). There were 97 housing units at an average density of 307.5 per square mile (117.0/km^{2}). The racial makeup of the town was 97.70% White, 1.15% African American, and 1.15% from two or more races. Of the 78 households 25.6% had children under the age of 18 living with them, 46.2% were married couples living together, 12.8% had a female householder with no husband present, and 35.9% were non-families. 34.6% of households were one person and 23.1% were one person aged 65 or older. The average household size was 2.23 and the average family size was 2.86.

The age distribution was 24.1% under the age of 18, 5.7% from 18 to 24, 24.7% from 25 to 44, 25.3% from 45 to 64, and 20.1% 65 or older. The median age was 42 years. For every 100 females, there were 93.3 males. For every 100 females age 18 and over, there were 88.6 males.

The median household income was $21,875 and the median family income was $27,500. Males had a median income of $31,250 versus $18,750 for females. The per capita income for the town was $12,746. About 4.3% of families and 9.7% of the population were below the poverty line, including 5.6% of those under the age of eighteen and 16.7% of those sixty five or over.

== Notable person ==
- Walt Craddock, baseball player.
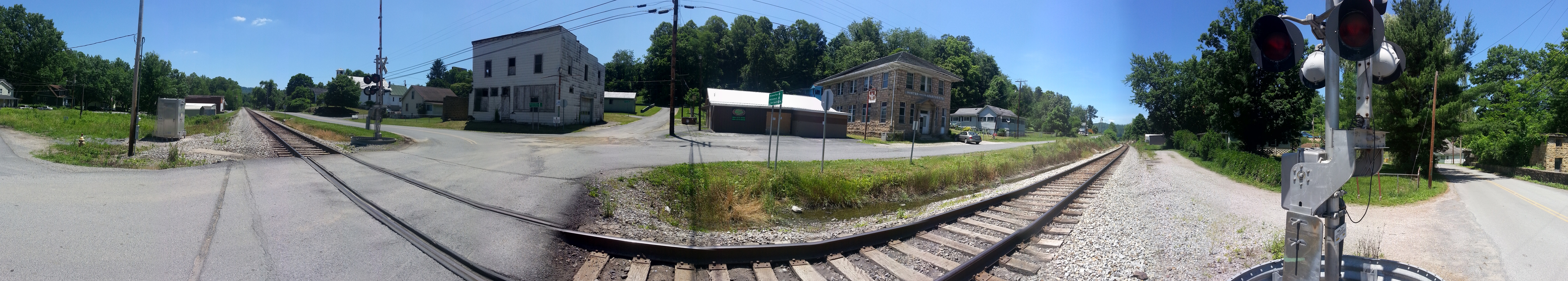
Pax
