= Heroin(e) =

2017 short documentary film by Elaine McMillion Sheldon

- Film poster
- Directed by: Elaine McMillion Sheldon
- Produced by: Elaine McMillion Sheldon; Kerrin Sheldon
- Music by: Daniel Hart
- Distributed by: Netflix
- Release date: September 3, 2017
- Running time: 39 minutes
- Country: United States
- Language: English

Heroin(e) is a 2017 American short documentary film directed by Elaine McMillion Sheldon and produced by Elaine McMillion Sheldon and Kerrin Sheldon. It was nominated for the Academy Award for Best Documentary Short Subject at the 90th Academy Awards.

== Synopsis ==
The documentary centers on the opioid epidemic, specifically its effect on Huntington, West Virginia, where the overdose rate is 10 times the US average. It follows first responders, judges, and local nonprofits attempting to help people who struggle with opioid addiction and bring them to recovery as the city grips with a growing number of heroin and prescription painkiller overdoses, and eventually, the much more potent fentanyl. Among them are three women alluded to in the film's name: Huntington Fire Chief Jan Rader who, with other emergency responders, treats overdose victims; Cabell County Judge Patricia Keller, who heads the drug court; and Necia Freeman of Brown Bag Ministry, who delivers food to women who resort to prostitution to support their addictions.

The documentary explains the use of naloxone to treat overdose victims, and explores the psychological toll on the county's first responders who see dozens of overdoses a month. It follows first responders to calls as people overdose, including one instance where a woman is revived at the counter of a convenience store while customers continue checking out nearby. There are several dozen interviews with people who have been addicted and are in recovery who discuss the effects of the drug on their lives and their efforts to recover from it.

== Production ==
=== Conception ===
Sheldon, who grew up in Logan and Elkview, West Virginia, said the opioid epidemic was personal and that she had friends and classmates impacted by addiction. The documentary was produced as a collaboration with the Center for Investigative Reporting, with a hopeful tone that focuses less on history, statistics and politics, and more on the daily routines of people impacted daily by opioids. Media covering the issue focused heavily on victims and she later said she wanted to create a documentary that focused more on the people helping them. In the process, she said she hoped the documentary would bring attention to addiction as something that impacts people of all demographics.

In making the documentary, she said she sought to change the perception of opioid addiction from a "moral failure" to one of a "medical issue" where recovery is possible. Appalachia has seen problems with opioid addiction for some time before it gained a wider public understanding in the United States. She told Vanity Fair that she felt that while government, health care and pharmaceutical companies weren't paying attention to the plight in West Virginia, that the solutions to the opioid epidemic would ultimately come from there, because of how people like the subjects in her film have worked to help one another. Conversely, she said West Virginians have ignored the problem for too long and it needs to be addressed, regardless of the documentary's impact on how others view the state.

=== Filming ===
The documentary was shot between February 2016 and May 2017, off and on. Sheldon and her husband were the only two involved in filming on the ground, which they did off-and-on for a total of 38 days. The Center for Investigative Reporting funded the film through its Glassbreaker initiative.

Sheldon reached out to the city mayor's office about the documentary, and was introduced to Rader, Keller and others. She and her husband subsequently rode along with the Fire Department for about 20 days over a period of six months. Rader later told Roll Call she was concerned with members of her department suffering from post traumatic stress disorder as its members see 40 or more dead bodies a year, including friends and classmates. She also said she wanted to highlight the estimated $100 million impact opioids had on Cabell County's economy, as her department responds to five to seven overdoses a day. Though Rader, Sheldon was introduced to a number of people who experience the opioid epidemic every day, and settled on the three women featured in the documentary because they often work with the same people at different parts of their lives.

After filming, the couple approached Netflix which helped them craft the story in editing and post-production. The film's short length helps it as an educational tool, Sheldon said, because community screenings can dedicate an hour to the film — 39 minutes watching it and 20 minutes having a discussion about its contents. The creators built a field guide for screenings so it could be viewed in prisons, rehabilitation centers, and medical schools.

The film debuted at the August 2017 Telluride Film Festival. Netflix released it for streaming the next month. Screenings of the film have followed around the country, particularly in communities impacted by opioid addition.

== Reception ==
Heroin(e) has an approval rating of 100% on review aggregator website Rotten Tomatoes, based on 10 reviews, and an average rating of 8.25/10.

The film was praised for its tone. Forbes called it an "optimistic counter-narrative" that focuses on an alternative to harsh or judgmental approaches to understanding the impacts of opioids. Forbes said it makes "a powerful case for compassion and for second, third, fourth and 10th chances," though not exploring their causes as deeply as other works such as JD Vance's Hillbilly Elegy. The Clarion-Ledger wrote that its "gritty" approach allowed the viewer to understand the daily lives of people trying to help those affected by addiction. The New York Times considered it a front-runner for an Oscar because it "addresses an issue in the news — the opioid epidemic — with present-tense reportage and an eye toward putting human faces on the crisis."

Huntington residents interviewed about the film were generally supportive of its contents, noting that it highlights the compassion of people in the community helping others.

Rader attended the 2018 State of the Union Address as a guest of Senator Joe Manchin and during the trip spoke to lawmakers about the opioid epidemic, which has had a substantial impact on Huntington's economy.

== See also ==
- Flint Town
