= Annie Lee =

Annie Lee may refer to:

- Annie Lee (Idaho City), Cantonese woman enslaved in the 1870s
- Annie Lee (artist) (1935–2014), American artist
- Annie Lee (actress) (born 1977), American actress

== See also ==
- Murder of Annie Le (died 2009), student murdered at Yale University
- Anne Lee (disambiguation)
- Anna Lee (disambiguation)
