= Annalee =

Annalee may refer to:

== People ==
- Annalee Blysse, American novelist
- Annalee Davis, Barbadian artist
- Annalee Jefferies, American actress
- Annalee Newitz, American journalist
- Annalee Skarin, American author
- Annalee Stewart, American chaplain
- Annalee Yassi, Canadian academic

== Other meanings ==
- Annalee Dolls, company manufacturing collectible dolls
- River Annalee, Ireland
- Annalee (comics), Marvel Comics character

== See also ==
- Anna Lee (disambiguation)
