= Anne Lee =

Anne or Ann Lee may refer to:

- Anne Lee (1585–1648), daughter of Sir John St John, 1st Baronet
- Anne Wharton (née Lee, 1659–1685), English writer
- Ann Lee (1736–1784), American religious leader known as "Mother Ann Lee"
- Ann Lee (illustrator) (1753–c. 1790), British natural history illustrator
- Anne Hill Carter Lee (1773–1829), first lady of Virginia
- Anne Carter Lee (1839–1862), daughter of General Robert E. Lee
- Ann Lee (actress) (1918–2003), American businesswoman and actress
- Ann Lee (activist) (1929–2025), American cannabis activist
- Ann Lee (singer) (born 1967), British Eurodance singer
- Ann Lee (economist), Chinese-American professor and author

== See also ==
- Annie Lee (disambiguation)
- Anna Lee (disambiguation)
- Ann Li (disambiguation)
- Ang Li (disambiguation)
