= Philip Moon (actor) =

American actor of Asian descent (born 1961)

- Born: November 5, 1961 (age 64)
- Education: Hunter College; Harvard University
- Occupation: Actor

Philip Moon (born November 5, 1961) is an American actor of Asian descent who has appeared primarily in television. He is best known for playing Keemo Volien Abbott in the CBS soap opera The Young and the Restless from 1994 to 1996, Mr. Lee in the TV series Deadwood (2005), and the thug Woo in the 1998 Coen brothers film The Big Lebowski. In 2007, he played the leading role in Allen Blumberg's drama film Ghosts of the Heartland. In 2011, he appeared in the "Dead Ringer" episode of CSI: Miami.

== Education ==
Moon graduated from Hunter College and the Institute for Advanced Theater Training at Harvard University.

== Career ==
Moon made his screen debut in the 1988 Catlin Adams comedy Sticky Fingers. This was followed by minor roles in the TV series As the World Turns and in Peter Wang's Hong Kong crime comedy The Laser Man in which he played a soldier. In 1991, he appeared in the series L. A. Law, and had minor roles in blockbuster movies such as Lethal Weapon 3 (1992) in which he played a squad member, and Batman Forever (1995) in which he played a newsreader.

In 1994, Moon appeared in the PBS miniseries Tales of the City as Lionel, the father of DeDe Halycon Day's illegitimate twins. He later portrayed Keemo Volien Abbott on the CBS soap opera The Young and the Restless from 1994 to 1996, which won him a Soap Opera Digest nomination for Outstanding Male Newcomer in 1995. Transatlantic magazine described Moon as a 6'3", muscular "soap stud" with a "soft voice" during this stint playing Abbott.

In 1997, he had a role opposite David Duchovny and Angelina Jolie in Andy Wilson's Playing God. Moon appeared alongside Jeff Bridges in 1998, as the thug who urinates on The Dude's rug in The Big Lebowski. He is referred to in the film by Bridges as "the Chinaman who peed on my rug", in which John Goodman prompts him that he's "Asian-American". In the late 1990s and early 2000s he had a string of roles playing police officers, including the 1998 TV movie Tempting Fate, the 1998 film Love Kills, and portraying detective Steven Nimh in the series Walker, Texas Ranger opposite Chuck Norris in 2000.

In 2004, Moon had a role as Lieutenant Jim Wong in the popular series 24, followed by a stint as Lee in the series Deadwood in which he appeared in five episodes. In 2007 he had a leading role in Allen Blumberg's drama film Ghosts of the Heartland opposite Michael Santoro and David Midthunder. In 2011 he appeared in the "Dead Ringer" episode of season 10 of CSI: Miami as Don Tillman.

== Filmography ==
=== Film ===
Year	Title	Role	Notes
1988	Sticky Fingers	Ike	
1988	The Laser Man	Soldier	
1989	Longtime Companion	Restaurant Bartender	
1990	A Shock to the System	Henry Park	
1990	Cadillac Man	Nightclub Selector	
1992	Lethal Weapon 3	Squad Member #5	
1993	The Joy Luck Club	Ken	
1994	S.F.W.	Reporter	
1995	Batman Forever	Male Newscaster	
1997	Playing God	Casey	
1998	The Big Lebowski	Treehorn Thug #1	
1998	Love Kills	The Rookie Cop	
1998	No Salida	Jian	
2004	Close Call	David Kim	
2006	The Genius Club	Professor Lee	
2007	88 Minutes	The Prosecutor	
2007	Ghosts of the Heartland	Roland	
2009	Company Retreat	Terry Yian	
2015	The Networker	David Finkelstein	

=== Television ===
Year	Title	Role	Notes
1984	Guiding Light	Tanaka	Episode #1.9453
1988	As the World Turns	Tuan Ly	Episode: "Hank Comes Out"
1991	L.A. Law	A.D.A. John Stephans	Episode: "Good to the Last Drop"
1991	Blood Ties	Jury Foreman	Television film
1992	Nightmare in the Daylight	San Francisco Detective	Television film
1993	Running Delilah	Technician #2	Television film
1993	Tales of the City	Lionel Wong	Episode #1.2
1994	Time Trax	Sessue Hiroshi	Episode: "Return of the Yakuza"
1994	Models Inc.	John Woo	Episode: "Pilot"
1994	Renegade	Paul Hajimoto	Episode: "Black Wind"
1994–1996	The Young and the Restless	Keemo	8 episodes
1996	NYPD Blue	Eddie Wong	Episode: "Sorry, Wong Suspect"
1996	Babylon 5	Ashi	Episode: "Dust to Dust"
1998	The Warlord: Battle for the Galaxy	Valois	Television film
1998	Tempting Fate	Police Official	Television film
1998	A Wing and a Prayer	Beastmaster	Television film
2000	Walker, Texas Ranger	Detective Steven Nimh	Episode: "The General's Return"
2001	Passions	T.V. Reporter	Episode #1.388
2001	The Division	Benny Chow	Episode: "Absolution"
2004	24	Lieutenant Jim Wong	Episode: "Day 3: 3:00 a.m.-4:00 a.m."
2005	Deadwood	Lee	6 episodes
2007	Numbers	Munson's Trainer	Episode: "Contenders"
2008	Pretty/Handsome	William Wang	Television film
2009	Hydra	Dr. Kim	Television film
2011	CSI: Miami	Don Tillman	Episode: "Dead Ringer"
2015	Hawaii Five-0	Makai Akana	Episode: "Mo'o 'olelo Pu"
2015	True Detective	Ashley Daison	Episode: "Maybe Tomorrow"
