= Vjekoslav Katušin =

Croatian actor and filmmaker

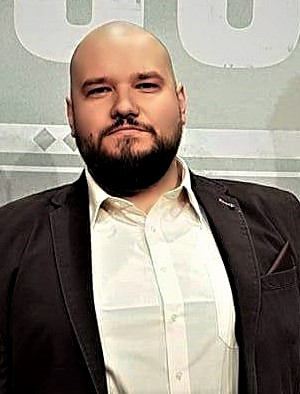
- Katusin at the premiere of Winnetou in 2017
- Born: 28 October 1983 (age 42); Mainz, West Germany
- Citizenship: Croatian
- Occupations: Actor; producer; director; screenwriter
- Years active: 2006–present

Vjekoslav Katušin (born 28 October 1983) is a Croatian actor, film producer, director, and screenwriter.

== Early life ==
At the age of one, he moved to his parents homeland Croatia with his mother and older brother. Until he was five, he lived in Draž, where he attended first grade in elementary school. After the first year of school he returned to Mainz with his mother and brother to visit his father. After the outbreak of war between Serbia and Croatia, his family was not allowed to return to Croatia.

== Career ==
Beginning in 2006, Katusin appeared as a minor actor in various films, including Superheroes – Hasenbrot and Waldgeflüster (2007). After meeting and developing a working relationship with German filmmaker Uwe Boll, he was cast in Boll's films Max Schmeling (2010). Katusin was also responsible for the Croatian cast of Boll's films Bloodrayne: The Third Reich (2011) and Blubberella (2011).

In 2015, Katusin made his debut as a producer on the Croatian crime series Dead End – At the End We Die. The series was translated to English in order to appeal to an international audience. The pilot episode premiered at the Harmony Gold Theater in Los Angeles.

In 2016, Katusin founded his own production company Dream Team Pictures in Rust, Baden-Württemberg/Germany. In 2017, he shot his first horror film C.L.E.A.N. in Pula, Croatia. Hollywood actors Tom Sizemore and Costas Mandylor were cast in the film. On 18 October 2020, the film was presented at the 14th Festival of Serbian Fantastic Film (FSFF) in Belgrade. C.L.E.A.N. received several awards from various film festivals, including two Osculls in the categories "Best Horror Film" and "Best Supporting Actor". The Austrian cinema chain Cineplexx showed the film for several weeks in their theatres in Serbia, Montenegro, and Bosnia.

In early 2020, he finished shooting his second horror film Unbound Evil, again with Costas Mandylor. In 2022, he finished his film project Someone Dies Tonight. Eric Roberts, Christopher Lambert, Tom Sizemore, Michael Paré, Bai Ling, Robert Miano & Costas Mandylor were cast in supporting roles.

== Filmography (selection) ==
As actor

- 2007: Stuntmen – Der Film
- 2007: Blood Wars
- 2007: Superhelden – Hasenbrot und Waldgeflüster
- 2007: Live Fast and Die Young
- 2008: Der letzte Coup
- 2010: Max Schmeling
- 2011: Bloodrayne: The Third Reich
- 2011: Blubberella
- 2016: Dead End. At the End We Die
- 2018: La Famiglia
- 2019: C.L.E.A.N.
- 2022: Unbound Evil
- 2026: Citizen Vigilante

As producer

- 2008: Der letzte Coup
- 2016: Dead End. At the End We Die
- 2018: La Famiglia
- 2019: C.L.E.A.N.

As director

- 2026: Order of the Dragon

== Reception ==
On October 18, 2020, his movie C.L.E.A.N. was presented at the 14th Festival of Serbian Fantastic Film (FSFF) in Belgrade. Subsequently, the producer received several awards from various international film festivals.

year	award	category	winner	result
2021	Vegas Movie Awards	Best Horror	Vjekoslav Katusin	Won
2020	Dreamachine International Film Festival	Best Supernatural Horror	Vjekoslav Katusin	Won
2020	Festival of Serbian Fantastic Film (FSFF)	Best Horror Film	Vjekoslav Katusin	Won
2020	Oniros Film Awards New York	Best Thriller	Vjekoslav Katusin	Won
2020	Paris Film Festival	Best Horror	Vjekoslav Katusin	Nominated
