= Charles Hoyes =

American actor

Charles Hoyes is an American actor known for his work in film, television, and theater. He has appeared in a range of roles across various genres, including television appearances in Matlock (TV series), The Dukes of Hazzard and The X-Files. Hoyes is also known for his film roles in Field of Dreams, Space Jam, and Southpaw. His theater credits include performances in Bill W. and Dr. Bob and Lost In Radioland.

== Early life and education ==
Hoyes grew up in Washington, Pennsylvania, and graduated from Trinity High School (Washington, Pennsylvania) in 1972, where he was involved in the theater program. He went on to attend West Virginia Wesleyan College in Buckhannon, West Virginia. During his junior year, he was inducted into the Pi Gamma Mu honor society. He was also a member of the Omicron Delta Kappa national leadership society and a member of the varsity football team for the West Virginia Wesleyan Bobcats.

== Career ==
=== Television roles ===
In 1982, Hoyes appeared as Simon Jones in The Dukes of Hazzard episode, during the show's fourth season, titled "The Law and Jesse Duke." In 1986, he played Officer Stanley, the out-of-costume McGruff the Crime Dog, in Webster (TV series). In that same year, he appeared as Snake Barker in the ninth episode of Matlock during its first season.

He portrayed Howard Crittendon in "Chimera," the sixteenth episode of the seventh season of the science fiction television series The X-Files, which aired in 2000.

Hoyes played Thompson in the Lord John Marbury episode of The West Wing during its first season.

=== Theater performances ===
In 2003, Hoyes portrayed Bill W. in the theatrical production Bill W. and Dr. Bob, presented by Theatre 68. He also appeared in Lost In Radioland, a 2009 production by Theatre 68.

=== Film appearances ===
Hoyes had a starring role in Effects (film). He had small roles in The Fish That Saved Pittsburgh and The Deer Hunter. He played the role of Wayne in the 1981 film Home Sweet Home.

In 1989, Hoyes gained recognition for his role as Swede Risberg in the classic film Field of Dreams. In 1992, he returned to the Field of Dreams (Dubuque County, Iowa) for the Upper Deck Field of Dreams Charity Baseball game in Dyersville, Iowa. In the 1990s, he appeared in Molly (1999) as the 1st Base Umpire and in Space Jam (1996) as Baron's Catcher.

He portrayed Danny Murtaugh in Baseball's Last Hero: 21 Clemente Stories.

In 2015, he played the lawyer of Billy Hope, portrayed by Jake Gyllenhaal, in the film Southpaw, which filmed pivotal courtroom scenes at the Washington County Courthouse. He said of working with Gyllenhaal, ""He's a fantastic actor to work with. I'm just playing off of him."

Hoyes appeared as Mark Jacobs in the 2017 film Slamma Jamma. The film is a sports drama centered around a former basketball star who, after being wrongfully imprisoned, aims to reclaim his life and dreams by participating in a high-stakes slam dunk competition.

== Personal life ==
Hoyes lives in Thousand Oaks, California.
