= Michael Cognata =

American actor and record producer

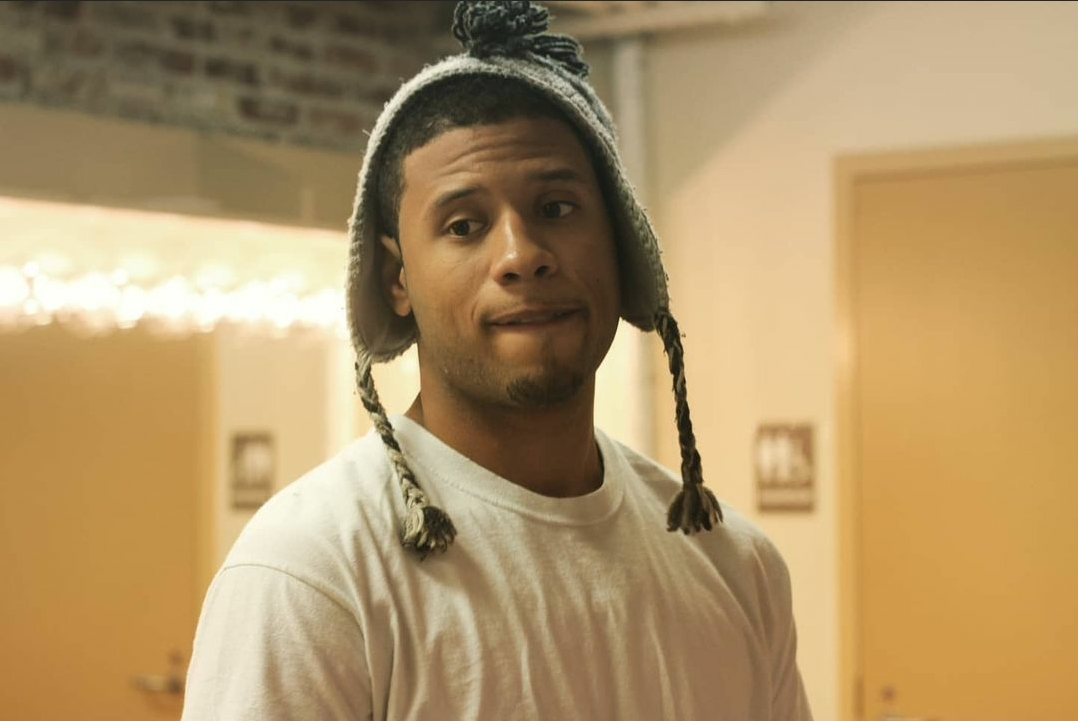
- Cognata backstage at the Strand Theatre for ARTiculation's One Night Only
- Born: Michael Joseph Cognata; May 5, 1988 (age 38); Boston, Massachusetts, U.S.
- Other names: Mike Cognata; Mikey Fwesh
- Education: Boston Arts Academy
- Occupation: Actor
- Years active: 2007–present
- Television: The Pitt; Chicago Fire; Shameless; 9-1-1
- Musical career
- Origin: North Hollywood, Los Angeles, California, U.S.
- Genres: Hip hop; experimental
- Label: Twelfth Dimension
- Website: www.mikecognata.com

Michael Joseph Cognata (born May 5, 1988) is an American actor from Boston, Massachusetts. He played Julian Robbins in NBC's Chicago Fire and Tito in Showtime's Shameless. He appears as Allen Billings in the series, The Pitt.

== Career ==
Cognata attended the Boston Arts Academy (2006) where he majored in theatre. In 2008, Cognata made his television debut in a national commercial for Subway and performed with the poetic entertainment group called ARTiculation. The Boston Herald writes in a 2009 article, "Give the creativity and enthusiasm of this highly talented group of young poets a chance. Their performance is good enough to make even a cynic believe in the power of art." Cognata then moved to New York City and Los Angeles to obtain television roles including Julian Robbins, brother-in-law to battalion chief Wallace Boden on NBC's Chicago Fire (2018), and recurring as Tito, Lip's intern on Showtime's Shameless (2016). He appeared in Hallmark's Romance at Reindeer Lodge (2017). In addition to his work in film and TV, Cognata represented his hometown in the Edinburgh Festival Fringe (2006), where he performed the play A More Perfect Union.

== Filmography ==
=== Television ===
Year	Title	Role	Notes
2015	The Young and the Restless	Rescue Worker	4 episodes
2015	The Last Ship	Firefighting Sailor	Season 2, episode 12
2016	Castle	Darren Ives	Season 8, episode 16
2016	Shameless	Tito	2 episodes
2017	Life in Pieces	Realtor Don	Season 2, episode 10
2018	Chicago Fire	Julian Robbins	2 episodes
2019	Grown-ish	Officer Dickson	Season 2, episode 3
2019	Taking Stock	Kevin	3 episodes
2019	9-1-1	Officer Crawford	Season 2, Episode 13
2019	The Fix	Andre Spencer	Season 1, episode 9
2020	Good Trouble	Derrick	Season 2, episode 12
2023	Julia	Martin	Season 2, episode 1
2026	The Pitt	Allen Billings	Season 2, episode 1, 2, 5

=== Film ===
Year	Title	Role	Director	Notes
2010	Breakdance Academy	Kyle	Jon Artigo	
2012	A Deadly Obsession	Kellen	John Stimpson	
2013	Worldly Pursuits	Brian Higgins	Hugh Guiney	Short Film
2013	Sins of the Preacher	Police Officer	John Stimpson	
2013	Hatfields & McCoys	Ernie Rivas	Michael Mayer	
2014	The Assault	Jordan	Jason Winn	
2016	Downpour Summer	Brendan	Diante Singley	
2016	Trash Bags	Miles	Diante Singley	
2017	Slamma Jamma	Lizare	Timothy A. Chey	Platform Release
2017	Romance at Reindeer Lodge	Greg	Colin Theys	
2017	Remote Capture	Elijah/Day 9,145	Diante Singley	
2019	A True Crime	Detective Myers	Marques Green	
2020	Nothing and No One	Ernie	Diante Singley	
2021	Killer Whales	Father T-Dale	William J.L. Hamilton	Post-Production

== Discography ==
Cognata has released several singles.

List of singles as a lead artist
Title	Year
Silvasurf	2020
I Might Be	2021
Bad Man	2021
King Burial (Instrumental)	2021
