= Murder 101 =

Murder 101 may refer to:

== Films ==
- Murder 101 (1991 film), a TV film starring Pierce Brosnan
- Murder 101 (2014 film), an American horror film
- Murder 101 (film series), a 2006–2008 series of four Hallmark mystery films with Dick and Barry Van Dyke

== Television episodes ==
- "Murder 101" (Magnum, P.I.), an episode of Magnum, P.I.
- "Murder 101" (The Pretender), an episode of The Pretender
- "Murder 101" (The Sentinel), an episode of The Sentinel
