= Ann Li =

Ann Li may refer to:

- Ann Li (businesswoman) (born 1995), Taiwanese businesswoman
- Ann Li (tennis) (born 2000), American tennis player

== See also ==
- Anne Lee (disambiguation)
- Ang Li (disambiguation)
