= The Firing Squad (2024 film) =

- Release poster
- Directed by: Timothy A. Chey
- Written by: Timothy A. Chey
- Produced by: Susan F. Chey; Timothy A. Chey; Nadia Maximova
- Starring: James Barrington; Cuba Gooding Jr.; Kevin Sorbo; Edmund Kwan; Tupua Ainu'u; Eric Roberts
- Cinematography: Roger Artola
- Edited by: S. Michael Rosen Jr.
- Music by: Tomas Peire
- Production companies: Rock Studios; Epoch Studios; The Epoch Times; RiverRain Productions
- Distributed by: Epoch Studios
- Release date: August 2, 2024
- Running time: 93 minutes
- Country: United States
- Language: English
- Box office: $1.7 million

The Firing Squad is a 2024 American Christian adventure drama film written and directed by Timothy A. Chey and starring James Barrington, Kevin Sorbo, and Cuba Gooding Jr. It was released on August 2, 2024 by Epoch Studios, a division of the Epoch Times Association.

== Plot ==
Three Australian drug smugglers face execution in Indonesia for drug smuggling. They find solace from their Christian faith.

The film is inspired by the story of Andrew Chan and Myuran Sukumaran, members of the Bali Nine.

== Cast ==
- James Barrington as Peter Lone
- Madeline Anderson as Miriam Rosenbaum
- Kevin Sorbo as Pastor Lynbrook
- Edmund Kwan as Liu Fat
- Cuba Gooding Jr. as Samuel Wilson
- Tupua Ainu'u as Captain Tanu
- Eric Roberts as Adam Markman
- Jonathan Nagy as John Thornton

== Production ==
In November 2023, it was announced that production wrapped.

Gooding said when he first read the script, he wept.

== Release ==
The Firing Squad was released nationwide in theaters on August 2, 2024.

The film opened at #9 nationwide in theaters opening weekend.

The movie also premiered in the 2024 National Religious Broadcasters (NRB) convention.
