= Lost In Radioland =

Lost In Radioland is a play written by actor/writer/director Ryan Paul James and actress Denny Siegel. The show opened September 4, 2009 at Theatre 68, and later in July 2010 at The Palisades Theatre.

James worked on Lost In Radioland for nearly five years. The show was produced by Ronnie Marmo, General Hospital.

== Casts ==
The 2009 showing brought out stars: Anne Jeffreys, Robert Costanzo, Leo Rossi, Sean Hayes, Valerie Harper, Gavin MacLeod, and James Worthy.

The 2009 original cast: Charles Hoyes, Melissa Disney, Katy Jacoby, Katie Zeiner, Kim Kutner, James Maderez, Johnny Soto, Bruce Barker, Virginia Novello, Jesse Mackey, Joe Dalo, James E. Welsh, Clint Tauscher, Ryan Paul James, Shelly Hacco, Kourtney Sontag, Peter Newman, Dan Bender, Hailey Ellen Agnew, Monica Quintanilla, Jeff Post, Denny Siegel.

2010 Cast: Charles Hoyes, Melissa Disney, Katy Jacoby, Katie Zeiner, Bruce Barker, Jesse Mackey, Joe Dalo, James E. Welsh, Clint Tauscher, Dan Bender, Jeff Post, Denny Siegel, Angela Pupello, Jordon Krain, Helaine Cira, Jilon VanOver, Mary Alton, Susan Silvestri, Ashley Adler, Caroline Simone O’Brien, Kim Hamilton.

Producer: Andrew Frew

Lighting and sound: Matt Lonn

== Reviews ==
Backstage said "This is the kind of threadbare old-fashioned farce that relies on obvious, over-familiar plot lines and clichéd characters."
