= Timothy A. Chey =

American film director

Tim Chey
- Born: Los Angeles, California, U.S.
- Occupations: Film director, screenwriter, film producer
- Website: timchey.com

Timothy A. Chey is an American film producer, writer and director. Among his films are Fakin' da Funk, Gone, Impact: The Passion of the Christ, Suing the Devil, The Genius Club, Live Fast, Die Young, Final the Rapture, Epic Journey, Freedom, David and Goliath, The Firing Squad, and Slamma Jamma.

== Biography ==
Chey was educated at Harvard Business School and Boston University School of Law doing a joint J.D./M.B.A. He earlier attended the American Academy of Dramatic Arts, and then got accepted to USC Film School as an undergrad.

Chey has been interviewed on Fox News, NBC News, TBN, Entertainment Tonight, Lamb and Lions, Good News TV. His work has been reviewed in The Wall Street Journal, the Los Angeles Times, VIBE TV, MTV, Daily Variety, The Hollywood Reporter, TNT, USA Networks, the Dove Awards, MovieGuide Awards, People, and The New York Times.

== Personal life ==
Chey is a devout Christian. When not making films, Chey is active in helping with the prison ministries, nursing home ministries, and speaking at colleges, churches, and film festivals. Chey worked as a lawyer before pursuing film full-time. He and his wife have two children and divide their time between Los Angeles and Honolulu.

== Films ==
In 1997, he wrote and directed Fakin' da Funk about a Chinese boy growing up in an African-American neighborhood, starring among others Pam Grier, Bo Jackson, and Nell Carter for USA Networks. The film was nominated for the Golden Starfish Award at the 1997 Hamptons International Film Festival and won the Audience Award at the 1997 Urbanworld Film Festival. The film was the highest-rated movie on USA Networks in 2000.

In 2002, Chey finished the feature film Gone, a movie about three lawyers who deal with the Rapture. While working with films at USC, Chey was the recipient of the prestigious "Spirit of the Independent" award for Best Director.

In 2004, Chey flew around the world to make the feature documentary Impact: The Passion of the Christ that looked at the impact of the movie The Passion of the Christ around the world. "Impact" had its debut in Dallas at the American Film Renaissance festival.

In 2006, he finished writing and directing The Genius Club. starring Stephen Baldwin, Tom Sizemore, Jack Scalia, and Paula Jai Parker. In 2008, he finished his fifth film, Live Fast, Die Young, about an A-list star who dies at a Hollywood party and a group of 10 Hollywood insiders seeking redemption in the aftermath.

In 2010, he wrote and directed Suing the Devil (starring Malcolm McDowell, Tom Sizemore, Rebecca St. James) about a guy who sues the devil for $8 trillion. The film was awarded the 5 Star Dove Award. The film was one of the most illegally downloaded indie movies in history.

In 2012, Chey wrote and directed Final the Rapture in four countries.

In 2012, Chey embarked on a 31-country (including Japan, Brazil, Argentina, China, United Kingdom, Egypt, Dubai, Peru, Hong Kong, et al.) journey for The Epic Journey, a film that shows people whose lives were changed by God. The film premiered on prime-time television on Daystar TV reaching over 80 million households. The film was submitted to Guinness World Records for most countries filmed in a movie.

In 2013, Chey also wrote and produced Freedom, based on the early life of John Newton. The film stars Cuba Gooding Jr., William Sadler, and Sharon Leal. The film premiered on Showtime Network to 55 million homes on prime-time.

In 2014, Chey wrote, produced and directed David and Goliath that was shot in North Africa and finished in studios in London.

In 2016, Chey produced and directed "Slamma Jamma" that was released nationwide in theaters in 281 cities on March 24, 2017. The film was the third-widest release in the nation. The film stars 5-time slam-dunk champion Chris Staples, Michael Irvin, Jose Canseco, et al. The film is about a man who finds God in prison and wins the national slam dunk competition against all odds.

In 2017, Chey is produced and directed "The Islands," a film based on Hawaii's beginnings from Captain Cook's arrival to King Kamehameha's unification wars through the last months of the monarchy of Queen Liliʻuokalani. The film was released on December 6, 2019.

On August 2, 2024, The Firing Squad, written and directed by Chey, was released. Produced by Epoch Studios, the film starred Kevin Sorbo and Cuba Gooding Jr. in leading roles.

Chey wrote, produced and directed 20 Minutes, a film set during the 2018 Hawaii false missile alert. First set to be released in 2020 , it was finally released in 2023. The film tells the story of twelve people's reactions to the text alert sent, in error, by the state, warning of an imminent nuclear strike.

== Awards ==
- 5 Star Dove Award for The Genius Club (starring Trica Helfer, Stephen Baldwin, Tom Sizemore).
- 5 Star Dove Award for Suing the Devil (starring Malcolm McDowell, Tom Sizemore, Corbin Bernsen).
- 4 Star Dove Award for Freedom (starring Cuba Gooding Jr., William Sadler, Sharon Leal).

== Filmography ==
Film	Year
Fakin' da Funk	1997
Gone	2002
Impact	2004
The Genius Club	2006
Live Fast, Die Young	2008
Suing the Devil	2011
Final: The Rapture	2013
David and Goliath	2014
Freedom	2015
Epic Journey	2015
Slamma Jamma	2017
The Islands	2019
The Firing Squad	2024
The Flood: End of Mankind	2026

== Lawsuit ==
In 2018, Chey sued the Hawaii Film Office, state Film Commissioner Donne Dawson, and film office specialist Benita Brazier in U.S. District Court, alleging religious discrimination in the denial of tax credits for his faith-based film The Islands. The suit sought $100 million in punitive damages. The case was settled after the Hawaii Film Office certified the production for the full tax credits it had requested, and Chey voluntarily dismissed the lawsuit.
