= C.L.E.A.N. =

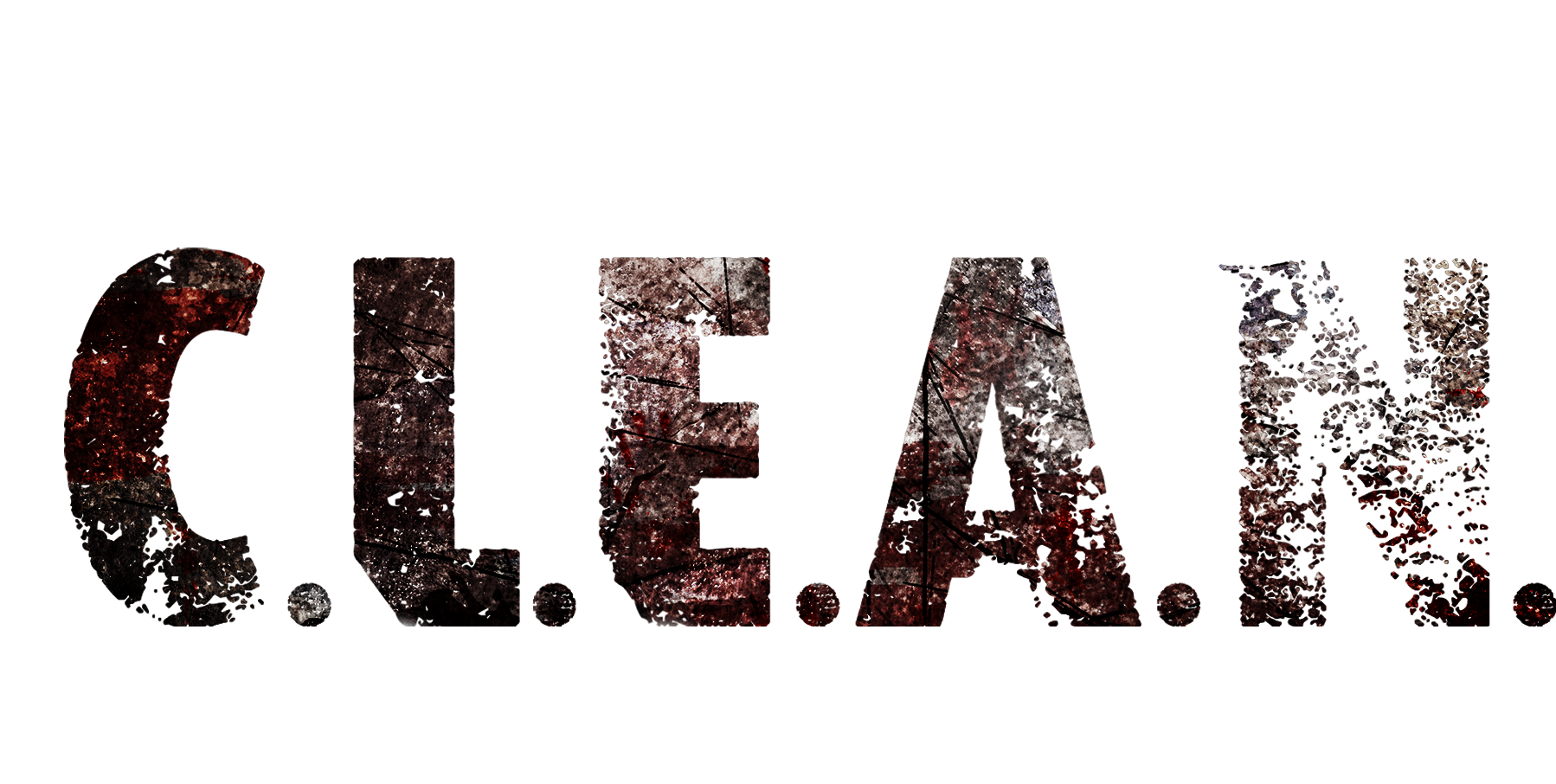
- Directed by: Aurelio Agliata
- Written by: Konstantin Georgiou
- Produced by: Vjekoslav Katusin
- Starring: Costas Mandylor; Tom Sizemore; Jenny Paris; Fred Lobin; Maik van Epple; Vjekoslav Katusin; Lou Cefair
- Edited by: Ivica Peric
- Music by: Sakis Petropoulos; Mirko Rizzelo
- Production company: Dream Team Pictures
- Distributed by: Fame Solutions
- Release date: 2020
- Running time: 109 minutes
- Country: Croatia
- Language: English
- Budget: 1.5 million

C.L.E.A.N. is a 2020 Croatian horror-thriller from Vjekoslav Katusin featuring Costas Mandylor and Tom Sizemore. The film was published by Dream Team Pictures under the name Čistilište, together with the Austrian cinema chain Cineplexx. It was released in Serbia, Montenegro, and Bosnia for several weeks starting in October 2020.

== Plot ==
C.L.E.A.N. is about four patients who all suffer from various addictions, such as addiction to alcohol, drugs, and sex. In his sanatorium, Dr. Sutter offers a cure in which he uses the C.L.E.A.N. (Cerebral Lateralization Enforcement and Neuroactivation) program that he practices modifying the behavioral patterns of the brain in order to heal his patients. What looks like hope at first glance turns into chaos, which is ultimately about pure survival. Only the patient Alice, who has been plagued by fear and visions from a very young age, especially because she has witnessed the gruesome murder of her own mother, realizes that something is wrong and is ultimately in the clutches of a perfidious pact.

== Cast ==
- Costas Mandylor as Dr. Sutter
- Tom Sizemore as Mr. Wilkens
- Jenny Paris as Alice
- Fred Lobin as Noah Bishop
- Maik van Epple as Joe
- Lou Cefair as Luzifer

== Production ==
In 2016, the screenwriter Axel Melzner, who works for the film production company Dream Team Pictures, recommended the renowned author Konstantin Georgiou, who studied at the New York Film Academy, for the development of the C.L.E.A.N. script. The plot was inspired by films such as Guardians of the Galaxy and The Avengers, in which the credits refer to an antagonist who is supposed to occupy a leading role in future film productions. C.L.E.A.N. is similarly intended as a prequel for the upcoming film The Vultures Are Waiting, which is set to be a modern Desperado-style western.

As Location for the shooting of C.L.E.A.N. an urban villa in the Croatian coastal town of Pula on the Istrian peninsula was selected. The Bunker Studios in Serbia were jointly responsible for the computer-generated effects.

== Reception ==
On October 18, 2020, C.L.E.A.N. presented at the 14th Festival of Serbian Fantastic Film (FSFF) in Belgrade. Subsequently, the film received several awards from various international film festivals.

year	award	category	winner	result
2021	Vegas Movie Awards	Best Horror	Vjekoslav Katusin	Won
2021	Vegas Movie Awards	Best Supporting Actor	Tom Sizemore	Won
2020	Dreamachine International Film Festival	Best Supernatural Horror	Vjekoslav Katusin	Won
2020	Dreamachine International Film Festival	Best Supporting Actor	Costas Mandylor	Won
2020	Dreamachine International Film Festival	Best Screenplay	Konstantin Georgiou	Won
2020	Festival of Serbian Fantastic Film (FSFF)	Best Horror Film	Vjekoslav Katusin	Won
2020	Festival of Serbian Fantastic Film (FSFF)	Best Supporting Actor	Costas Mandylor	Won
2020	New York Movie Awards	Best Original Screenplay	Konstantin Georgiou	Won
2020	New York Movie Awards	Best Actress	Jenny Paris	Won
2020	New York Movie Awards	Best Original Score	Sakis Petropoulos & Mirko Rizello	Won
2020	Athens International Monthly Art Film Festival	Best Cinematography	Dragan Šiša	Won
2020	Oniros Film Awards New York	Best Editing	Ivica Peric	Won
2020	Oniros Film Awards New York	Best Screenplay	Konstantin Georgiou	Won
2020	Oniros Film Awards New York	Best Thriller	Vjekoslav Katusin	Won
2020	Paris Film Festival	Best Horror	Vjekoslav Katusin	Nominated
2020	Paris Film Festival	Best Editing	Ivica Perić	Nominated
