= Li Ang =

Li Ang may refer to:

- Emperor Wenzong of Tang (809–840), personal name Li Ang, Tang dynasty emperor
- Li Ang (writer) (born 1952), Taiwanese writer
- Li Ang (footballer) (born 1993), Chinese association footballer
- Li Ang (murderer), murdered Amanda Zhao

== See also ==
- Ang Li (disambiguation)
- Ang Lee, Taiwanese-American film director
- Liang (disambiguation)
