= Pointman =

TV series

- British video cover
- Created by: Steve Hattman, Maurice Hurley, Joel Surnow
- Directed by: Robert Ellis Miller
- Starring: Jack Scalia
- Country of origin: United States

Production
- Production companies: Elliot Friedgen & Co.

Original release
- Network: PTEN
- Release: January 24, 1994

Pointman is a TV movie pilot and TV series on the Prime Time Entertainment Network in 1995. The main character was framed and convicted of fraud while he was an investment banker. Eventually cleared, Constantine 'Connie' Harper helps others while running a coastal resort. The hotel, pool, and marina scenes in the pilot episode were filmed at the South Shore Harbour Resort & Conference Center and adjacent South Shore Harbour Marina in League City, Texas. The series was filmed in Jacksonville, Florida.

== TV movie ==
In this TV movie, the main character, Constantine Nicholas 'Connie' Harper (Jack Scalia), is framed and sent to prison for fraud and assaulting the trial's prosecuting attorney. After serving his time and being granted his release, a former cellmate requests that Connie protect the cellmate's sister, Rosie (Roxann Dawson), an aspiring clothing designer, who is being threatened by a diamond broker as Harper was put on "the list", a collection of people to go to for last resort assistance. At first, Connie is reluctant to help, but he eventually agrees to protect Rosie from the diamond broker.

== TV series ==
Pointman
- Created by: Maurice Hurley; Joel Surnow
- Starring: Jack Scalia
- Composer: Dale Menten Mike Post
- Country of origin: United States
- Original language: English
- No. of seasons: 2
- No. of episodes: 22

Production
- Executive producer: Maurice Hurley
- Running time: 60 minutes
- Production company: Pointman Productions Inc.

Original release
- Network: PTEN
- Release: January 26 – November 27, 1995

Pointman was greenlighted for a series and ran for two seasons, the first for 13 episodes, and the second for only nine. In the series, Constantine "Connie" Harper, the main character, sets up shop as an owner of a Florida beach resort (Jacksonville, Florida and its beach suburbs), Spanish Pete's, while aiding people in need with the use of "the list" and former jailmates.

=== Cast ===
- Jack Scalia as Constantine 'Connie' Harper

=== Episodes ===
==== Season 1 (1995) ====
Episode #	Episode title	Original airdate
1-1	"That's Amore a.k.a. What's Amore Got to Do With It?"	January 23, 1995
1-2	"Adios Roberto"	January 30, 1995
1-3	"Father Connie"	February 6, 1995
1-4	"Everything in the World"	February 13, 1995
1-5	"Models"	February 20, 1995
1-6	"My Momma's Back"	February 27, 1995
1-7	"Silent Auction"	April 24, 1995
1-8	"Treasure Hunt"	May 1, 1995
1-9	"Ultimate Showdown"	May 8, 1995
1-10	"Judgement Day"	May 15, 1995
1-11	"Storm Warning"	May 22, 1995
1-12	"A Polecat Runs Through It"	July 3, 1995
1-13	"The Jumper"	July 31, 1995

==== Season 2 (1995) ====
Episode #	Episode title	Original airdate
2-14	"The Good, the Bad and the Irish"	October 2, 1995
2-15	"Trading Up in the Pale Moonlight"	October 9, 1995
2-16	"The Psychic"	October 16, 1995
2-17	"Business and Pleasure"	October 23, 1995
2-18	"Prisoner of Love"	October 30, 1995
2-19	"Going Home"	November 6, 1995
2-20	"Here She Comes, Miss Murder"	November 13, 1995
2-21	"Take the Points"	November 20, 1995
2-22	"Bout Money"	November 27, 1995
