= The Assault (2017 film) =

2017 action film directed by Jacob Cooney

- Directed by: Jacob Cooney
- Written by: David Gere
- Produced by: Bill Hanstock
- Starring: Tom Sizemore; Jordan Ladd; Nikki Moore; Kevin Nash; David Gere
- Release date: July 2017
- Country: USA

The Assault is a 2017 action film directed by Jacob Cooney, and starring Tom Sizemore, Jordan Ladd, Nikki Moore, Kevin Nash and David Gere.

== Plot ==
A woman (Jordan Ladd) dissatisfied with her marriage arranges robberies to escape her abusive husband with her best friend (Nikki Moore), but when the dead escapes, Detective Gary Broza (Tom Sizemore) sets out on their trail.

== Cast ==
- Tom Sizemore as Gary Broza
- Jordan Ladd as Lindsay Walters
- Nikki Moore as Nicole
- Tom Denucci as Seth Walters
- Kevin Nash as Cisco
- David Gere as Declan

== Production ==
Filming for The Assault took place in Cromwell and Middletown, Connecticut, under the working title of Blue Line. Principal photography was completed in February 2015.

== Release ==
The film was released on DVD in July 2017.

== Reception ==
Nerdly was critical, writing that "I do commend Cooney for wanting to make a film that has two strong female leads, it’s just that the finished product doesn’t portray them as such. In fact it’s not until the concluding moments of The Assault that our two leads actually get the least bit interesting… but by then its too little too late unfortunately."
