= Central Park Dark =

2021 American thriller film

- film poster
- Directed by: Cybil Lake
- Written by: Cybil Lake
- Starring: Cybil Lake; Tom Sizemore
- Cinematography: David Quateman; Sebastian Buczyk
- Edited by: Seth Jacobson
- Release date: February 2, 2021
- Running time: 81 minutes
- Country: United States
- Language: English

Central Park Dark is a 2021 American thriller film written and directed by Cybil Lake and starring Lake and Tom Sizemore.

== Premise ==
A doctor who is married after spending a night with a woman begins to have strange nightmares about her.

== Cast ==
- Cybil Lake as Anna Black
  - Addie Seiler as Yong Anna
- Tom Sizemore as Tom Winters
- Margaret Reed as Brenda Winters
- Lily Peterson as Mandy Winters
- Al Nazemian as Vincent
- Roger Rathburn as George
- Damen Corrado as Robert
- Sebastian Buczyk as Bernie
- Valentina Imokhai as Anna's Client
- Anthony Aoppola as Tom's Colleague 1
- Bernardo Tiaba as Tom's Colleague 2
- Samuel Shurtleff as Tom's Colleague 3
- Oksana Mamchur as Tom's Colleague 4

== Release ==
The film was released on February 2, 2021.

== Reception ==
Bobby LePire of Film Threat gave the film a 7 out of 10.
