= Bottom Feeder =

- DVD Cover
- Directed by: Randy Daudlin
- Screenplay by: Randy Daudlin
- Produced by: Erin Berry; Patrick Cameron; Harvey Glazer; Robert Wilson
- Starring: Tom Sizemore; Wendy Anderson; Richard Fitzpatrick; Amber Cull; Martin Roach; James Binkley; Simon Northwood; Philip Akin; Tig Fong; Joe Dinicol
- Cinematography: David Mitchell
- Edited by: Eduardo Martinez
- Music by: Ryan Latham
- Production companies: Feeders Films; 235 Films
- Distributed by: Genius Entertainment
- Release date: March 4, 2007
- Running time: 86 minutes
- Country: United States
- Language: English

Bottom Feeder is a 2007 American monster movie written and directed by Randy Daudlin. The film centers on a group of utility workers who have become trapped in the maze of tunnels underneath the city where they are stalked and killed by something terrible.

== Plot ==
Millionaire Charles Deaver (Richard Fitzpatrick), who has been heavily disfigured by an automobile accident, seeks to save his life by investing in the work of Dr. Nathaniel Leech (James Binkley). Leech is a scientist developing a serum to regenerate dead cells, which he hopes to use to save his wife Miranda, who is dying of leukemia. When he presents the serum to Deaver, Leech explains that as the serum works, the patient will develop a ravenous hunger that must be treated with a special protein formula to avoid side effects. Deaver has his henchmen, including his top deputy Krendal (Wendy Anderson), brutally beat Leech; after Krendal shoots the doctor several times, she injects Leech with the serum and locks him in a tunnel system overnight, to see if the serum indeed works and regenerates him. As Krendal does not administer the accompanying protein, Leech's hunger quickly drives him to eat a rat and later a dog. He begins to mutate into a hybrid creature shortly thereafter.

A group of salvage workers led by Vince Stoker (Tom Sizemore) arrive at an abandoned hospital on the same property, hoping to find old equipment they can sell for quick cash. Stoker's niece, Sam (Amber Cull), is with the team for the first time. As they navigate the hospital, they enter the tunnels to reach the storage areas. Having now fully mutated into a giant, rat-like monster, Leech begins stalking the workers, killing Callum (Joe Dinicol) in front of Sam, who rushes to warn Vince and Otis (Martin Roach).

Meanwhile, Deaver sends Krendal and Wilkes (Simon Northwood) back into the tunnels to retrieve Leech, unaware that they are working for another employer. The duo lock all but one exit from the tunnels, sealing Stoker's team inside. They encounter Leech and shoot him, but he regenerates and kills Wilkes.

Krendal runs into Stoker's team and is initially hostile to them, but they decide to work together after fleeing from Leech. She confesses that she is a double agent working to acquire Leech's serum for the U.S. government to use in creating supersoldiers. Meanwhile, Leech finds Deaver in his limousine and exacts revenge by decapitating him.

To prevent Leech from escaping into the outside world, Vince and Krendal lure him back into the tunnels while Otis and Sam retrieve construction equipment to fight him. Krendal injures her leg while setting explosives, and sacrifices herself so Vince can carry out the rest of the plan. Vince, Sam and Otis kill Leech by cutting into his arms, chest and head with their power tools, but the timers on the explosives run out before they can leave, killing Otis while Vince and Sam barely survive.

Vince wakes up in a military hospital a week later, where he learns he and Sam were contaminated by Leech's serum via his blood as they killed him. The doctor connects Vince to an intravenous drip of the protein formula before leaving the room, while Vince cries out from the pain of his overwhelming hunger as the serum's effects take hold of him.

== Cast ==
- Tom Sizemore as Vince Stoker
- Wendy Anderson as Krendal
- Richard Fitzpatrick as Charles Deaver
- Amber Cull as Sam
- Martin Roach as Otis
- Joe Dinicol as Callum
- James Binkley as Nathaniel Leech
- Simon Northwood as Wilkes

== Production ==
It was reported that the film's lead actor Tom Sizemore walked out before filming could be completed. The actor later returned to finish filming his remaining scenes.

== Release ==
On March 30, 2007 the film's distributors posted an exclusive clip from the film on BDTV in order to promote the film's direct to video release later that year. Peace Arch Entertainment and Genius Entertainment released the film unrated on DVD on April 3, 2007.

== Reception ==
Steve Barton from Dread Central criticized the film's paper-thin story, and lack of sense, but also stated, "While certainly not a defining moment in terms of our genre, Bottom Feeder does enough right to keep even the most jaded viewer at least semi-entertained". Dave Murray from Arrow in the Head gave the film a score of 2/4, commending the film's acting, camerawork, setting, monster design, and twist ending. Murray concluded by stating that the film was "Recommended for fans of old school, mutant creature survival horror". Mike Long from DVD Talk noted that the film "struggles when the monster isn't on-screen", criticizing the film's opening as having "too much plot", lack of likable characters, and sense of repetition while the characters were in the tunnels. Long did, however, commend Anderson's and Fitzpatrick's performances, also stating that the film "never pretends to be anything more than a monster movie".

Digital Retribution.com awarded the film a score of three out of five stating, "Bottom Feeder is not as entertaining (or expensive) as Tom Sizemore's first star vehicle, The Relic, but fans of low budget creature features should find just enough here to keep them happy. Those who prefer complex plotting, slick production values, and non-mutating characters should probably try something else". Terror Hook.com gave the film a positive review applauding the film's acting, gore, and creature effects.
