= The Genius Club =

- Theatrical release poster
- Directed by: Tim Chey
- Written by: Tim Chey
- Produced by: Executive producers: Keiki Nishimura; Stephen Baldwin; Tom Sizemore; Jack Scalia; Producers: Arch Bonnema; Daishi Takiishi; Tim Chey; Mike Tarzian; Alisha Dickinson; Douglas White
- Starring: Stephen Baldwin; Tom Sizemore; Jack Scalia
- Cinematography: Tyler Allison
- Edited by: Tim Chey
- Music by: Daniel Bijan
- Distributed by: RiverRain Productions
- Release date: 27 October 2006 (United States)
- Running time: 110 minutes
- Country: United States
- Language: English

The Genius Club is an American 2006 Christian-themed dramatic thriller film written and directed by Tim Chey. It was released on 27 October 2006 via Cinemark Theatres.

The film tells the story of seven geniuses who try to solve the world's problems in one night in order to prevent a nuclear bomb from exploding in Washington, D.C. The film was produced and distributed by Cloud Ten Pictures and RiverRain Productions.

== Plot ==
On Christmas Eve, Armand (Tom Sizemore), a terrorist who has a hidden nuclear device in Washington D.C., forces the president of the United States government (Jack Scalia) to round up seven geniuses with IQs over 200. The group consists of a casino owner (Carol Abney), a biochemist (Paula Jai Parker), a professional baseball player (Matt Medrano), a seminary student (Jacob Bonnema), an economics professor (Phillip Moon), a painter (Tricia Helfer), and a pizza delivery guy (Stephen Baldwin).

The government places them in a bomb shelter and explains the group that they are there to solve the world's problems in one night; if they fail to gather a thousand points before morning, the terrorist will detonate the hidden nuclear device planted in the basement of the 'genius lair'.

== Cast ==
- Carol Abney as Julia Endersol
- Stephen Baldwin as Rory Johnson
- Jacob Bonnema as Jacob Chernov
- Tricia Helfer as Ally Simon
- Matt Medrano as Jose Delgado
- Philip Moon as Professor Lee
- Paula Jai Parker as Tatiana
- Huntley Ritter as Brian Mehlman
- Jack Scalia as The President
- Tom Sizemore as Armand
- Arch Bonnema as Chief of Staff Norm
- Dimitri Diatchenko as Jesse, The Mechanic
- Alasdair Lincoln as Stable Boy

== Background ==
The film was marketed during the 2007 Marché du Film (film market) which ran simultaneously with the 60th annual Cannes Film Festival.

Director Tim Chey wanted to make a film about the world's issues while combining the humanity and intelligence of the various character geniuses. Arch Bonnema produced the film, and his son Jacob plays Jacob Chernov, the seminary student.

The film is not explicitly religious, though it is Christian in its tone and message; seminary student Chernov, for example, at times quotes the Bible and answers the "meaning of life" question by observing that "there is no meaning outside of God."

Both director Tim Chey, who is a Christian, and the producers believed it was important that a "real Christian" play the part of Jacob Chernov, hence the selection of Jacob Bonnema, a Christian like his father.

== Critical reception ==
Most critical reviews were negative. Rotten Tomatoes gives the film a score of 14% based on 7 reviews.

Tom Maurstad, of The Dallas Morning News, described it as a "stultifying, static movie about a group of people trapped in a dingy boardroom yelling at one another and their tormentor. [...] The film's look is relentlessly dark and gritty, like Fight Club without all the fights. Meanwhile, the set-up, a group of strangers thrown together into some sadistic game designed by a psycho genius overseeing all via video screen, is like Saw without the gruesome carnage."

Gary Cogill of WFAA-TV called it a "very earnest film" and said "it has some moments. But the whole movie boils down to solving spiritual problems, and it's awkward without any subtle moments.

Yet, its Christian message did appeal to critics from Southern Vanity, a Dallas-based lifestyle magazine, and it won the Dove "Family Approved" Seal in June 2008.

== Distribution ==
The movie was released on DVD in September 2008.
