= Hustle (2004 film) =

2004 television film

- Based on: Pete Rose
- Directed by: Peter Bogdanovich

Production
- Production company: ESPN Films

Original release
- Release: September 25, 2004

Hustle is a 2004 television film about the baseball player Pete Rose, created by ESPN Films. It was first broadcast on September 25, 2004. The movie follows Rose as he gambled on Major League Baseball while managing the Cincinnati Reds, was caught and banned from baseball for life. The title is a reference to both Rose's gambling problem and his nickname, "Charlie Hustle".

The movie stars Tom Sizemore as Pete Rose and was directed by Peter Bogdanovich.

== Production ==
The script was largely based on the Dowd Report without Rose's involvement.

Major League Baseball did not approve the script or co-operate with the producers. ESPN was not given permission to use the uniforms, logos or trademarks of the Cincinnati Reds.

The job of directing was given to Peter Bogdanovich even though he was not a baseball fan. He was interested in that Pete Rose "is Dostoyevskian, a degenerate gambler. It's intriguing when somebody has an obsession he can't seem to cope with. With all the great things he accomplished, he screwed up his life. It's sad and fascinating." Bogdanovich thought the story was "very American... We build people up to such a degree in this country, they think they are outside the law. We honor celebrity to a fault... Then we're just as quick to tear them down."

"Peter's name is synonymous with excellence in film direction," said Ron Semaio of ESPN Original Entertainment. "His visionary and creative approach is well documented and hugely successful."

Bogdanovich said Rose "created an atmosphere around himself that was outside society, outside the law... [He] was operating on another level. There was a secret life there. People were living with lies. He traveled with not very distinguished company."

The lead role was played by Tom Sizemore, who Bogdanovich said would "be unbelievably great.. This is the right moment in his life to turn in a great performance. This role requires nuance. It's not a black-and-white kind of person. There are lots of colors."

Sizemore was on bail while making the film. Bogdanovich says ESPN gave him a few days of rehearsal with Sizemore in order to "make him feel wanted and OK... He had been traumatized a bit by what had been happening to him. He's a sensitive guy."

Filming started in Toronto on May 17, 2004. It was shot over three weeks. "I'm pleased with it," said Bogdanovich. "I believe the film to be well-written and well-researched."

== See also ==
- List of baseball films
