= John Kanzius =

American inventor (1944–2009)

John S. Kanzius
- Kanzius, circa 2005
- Born: March 1, 1944; Washington, Pennsylvania, United States
- Died: February 18, 2009 (aged 64); Fort Myers, Florida, United States
- Resting place: Millcreek Township, Erie County, Pennsylvania
- Education: Trinity High School (Washington, Pennsylvania)
- Occupations: Radio and Television Engineer
- Known for: RF generator

John S. Kanzius (March 1, 1944 – February 18, 2009) was an American inventor, radio and TV engineer, one-time station owner and ham radio operator (call sign: K3TUP) from Erie, Pennsylvania. He invented a method that, he said, could treat virtually all forms of cancer, with no side effects, and without the need for surgery or medication. He also demonstrated a device that generated flammable hydrogen-containing gas from salt-water-solution by the use of radiowaves. In the media this was dubbed "burning salt water". Both effects involve the use of his radio frequency transmitter.

Kanzius, self-taught, stated that he was motivated to research the subject of cancer treatment by his own experiences undergoing chemotherapy for treatment of non-Hodgkin's lymphoma. He died of B-cell leukemia with complications from pneumonia without seeing FDA approval and commercialization of his invention.

He was of Rusyn descent - his mother was Rusyn American.

== Cancer therapy ==
Kanzius RF Therapy is an experimental cancer therapy that employs a combination of either gold or carbon nanoparticles and radio waves.

The specific absorption rate for radio waves by living tissue in the proposed wavelengths and intensity levels is very low. Metals absorb this energy much more efficiently than tissue through dielectric heating; Richard Smalley has suggested that carbon nanotubes could be used to similar purpose. If nanoparticles were to be preferentially bound to cancer sites, cancer cells could be destroyed or induced into apoptosis while leaving healthy tissue relatively unharmed. This preferential targeting represents a major technical challenge. According to a presentation by Dr. Steven Curley, essentially all forms of cancer are potentially treatable using Kanzius RF therapy.

Kanzius built a prototype Kanzius RF device in his home, and formed Therm Med, LLC to test and market his inventions. The device was tested at University of Pittsburgh Medical Center in 2005. As of 2007-04-23, preliminary research using the device at The University of Texas M. D. Anderson Cancer Center has taken place and the University of Pittsburgh Medical Center If federal approval is granted, testing on human patients may follow.

== Burning salt water ==
Later in 2007, Kanzius demonstrated that the same 13.56 MHz radio frequency could be used to dissociate hydrogen and oxygen from a salt water solution, which could then be "burned." Rustum Roy, a materials scientist at Pennsylvania State University, clarified that the dissociated hydrogen was burning, not the water itself: "The salt water isn't burning per se, despite appearances. The radio frequencies act to weaken the bonds between the elements that make up salt water, releasing the hydrogen.".

Kanzius' demonstration received coverage from local TV stations. Despite news reports that this would allow using water as an energy source, that would represent a violation of the laws of thermodynamics and is therefore not what it does.

== See also ==
- Hydrogen production
- Electrolysis of water
- List of unproven and disproven cancer treatments
