= Fakin' da Funk =

1997 film directed by Tim Chey

- Directed by: Tim Chey
- Written by: Tim Chey
- Produced by: Tim Chey; Harry Yoo; Darren M. Demetre
- Starring: Pam Grier; Dante Basco; Margaret Cho; Duane Martin; Tone Loc; Ernie Hudson; Tatyana Ali
- Cinematography: Zoltán David
- Edited by: Chris Peppe
- Music by: Charlie Gross
- Production company: Octillion Entertainment
- Distributed by: USA Network
- Release date: July 20, 1997 (Asian American International Film Festival)
- Running time: 89 minutes
- Country: United States
- Language: English

Fakin' da Funk is a 1997 comedy film written and directed by Tim Chey. It stars Pam Grier, Ernie Hudson, Dante Basco, Tone Loc, Margaret Cho, and Tatyana Ali. The film is about two youths trying to adjust to a new environment in South Central Los Angeles, with one being a Chinese boy who was adopted and raised by Black parents, and the other a Chinese foreign-exchange student.

== Plot ==
Joe and Annabelle Lee, a Black couple living in Atlanta, are thrown for a surprise when they learn the baby that they adopted is Chinese and not black. Despite the mix-up, they decide to raise the baby, Julian, as their own. After Joe's death a few years later, the family decides to uproot from Atlanta to Los Angeles.

Once in LA, Julian tries to befriend his peers, but they are perplexed that he is Asian, yet talks and acts as if he is Black. Julian is also forced to intervene when his younger brother Perry falls in with a local gang.

In a parallel plot, foreign-exchange student May-Lee similarly experiences confusion when she discovers that she is being housed with a black family in South Central.

== Cast ==
- Ernie Hudson as Joe Lee
- Pam Grier as Annabelle Lee
- Margaret Cho as May-Lee
- Dante Basco as Julian Lee
- Rashaan Nall as Perry Lee
- Duane Martin as Brandon
- John Witherspoon as Bill
- Tone Loc as "Frog"
- Bo Jackson as Reverend Cecil
- Tichina Arnold as Tracy
- Chris Spencer as Charlie
- Kelly Hu as Kwee-Me
- Rudy Ray Moore as Larry
- Reynaldo Rey as Earnest
- Nell Carter as Claire
- Martin Chow as Sushi Chef
- Marta Cunningham as Tracy
- Ron Yuan as Walter "Chinese Walter"
- Dwanye Hackett as Willie
- Tatyana Ali as Karyn

== Production ==
The film was shot from July 9 to August 3, 1996 in South Central LA.

== Release ==
The film had its world premiere in July 1997 at the Asian American International Film Festival. It went on to screen at the Hamptons International Film Festival that October. It also screened at the Urbanworld Film Festival, where it won the Audience Award, and the Los Angeles Asian Pacific Film Festival.

The film was aired on the USA Network, where it became one of the channel's highest-rated films.

It was released on DVD on January 4, 2000, by Image Entertainment.

== Reception ==
Brendan Kelly of Variety called the film "an energetic, highly likable comedy". He added, "Chey keeps it grooving along at a good pace with lots of laughs along the way, making for a fun, if fairly light, look at a complicated subject", and though "the storytelling is a tad predictable", "the abundance of comic moments helps keep [its] feel-good message about racial harmony from becoming too earnest."

Nathan Rabin of The A.V. Club was more critical, writing "As in similar films—Woo, Sprung, I Got The Hook-Up, Booty Call—Fakin' Da Funk derives humor from exactly three sources: people insulting one another's parentage, random pop-culture references, and various misunderstandings concerning cultural differences."
