= Slamma Jamma =

- Directed by: Timothy A. Chey
- Written by: Timothy A. Chey
- Produced by: Timothy A. Chey; Susan F. Chey; Nihar Devella; Pavan Koppu; Appi Reddy; Ray Wallia
- Starring: Chris Staples; Michael Irvin; Jose Canseco; Kenny Dobbs; Ryan Gunnarson; Ray Walia; Michael Hardy; Michael Cognata; Aqueela Zoll; Kelsey Caesar
- Cinematography: Dean Cundey
- Edited by: Chris Conlee
- Distributed by: RiverRain Productions
- Release date: 23 March 2017
- Running time: 104 minutes
- Country: United States
- Language: English
- Budget: $1 million
- Box office: $1.6 million

Slamma Jamma is a 2017 American faith-based-themed sports drama film written and directed by Timothy A. Chey.

== Premise ==
Michael Diggs (Chris Staples), a former college basketball player, serves a six-year prison sentence for armed robbery. After his release, he enters and wins a national slam dunk competition.

== Cast ==
- Chris Staples as Michael Diggs
- Michael Irvin as Terrell
- Jose Canseco as Jose Canseco
- Kenny Dobbs as Kenny Dobbs
- Ryan Gunnarson as Jerome Matthews
- Ray Walia as Pastor John Soul
- Michael Hardy as Brandon
- Aqueela Zoll as Linda Collins
- Kelsey Caesar as Taye
- Gary Smith as Craig Jackson
- Kay Wallia as Melinda Jones
- Charles Hoyes as Mark Jacobs
- Rosemarie Smith-Coleman as Gemma
- Tammy Brawner as Tammy Goodwin
- Michael Cognata as Lizare
- William Thomas Jones as Warden Ed Williams
- Justin Darlington as Jammer
- Aaron Braxton as Red

== Reception ==
=== Box office ===
Slamma Jamma grossed $1,687,000 in 502 theaters in its opening weekend

=== Critical response ===
Slamma Jamma received mixed reviews.

In a review for Focus on the Family, the film critic wrote, "Slamma Jamma has a good heart and fine messages. But perhaps more importantly for those who want to see the film, it showcases some amazing athleticism. While this basketball film sometimes stumbles a bit narratively and content-wise, on the court its slam dunk maestros literally soar."

In a review for MovieGuide, the film critic wrote, "SLAMMA JAMMA is an uplifting, positive movie with strong Christian faith and values. It calls on people to choose God’s love and turn to faith to overcome the world’s troubles."

In a review for The Hollywood Reporter, Frank Scheck wrote that the film combined its "inspirational and sports-movie tropes in hackneyed, unoriginal fashion" and it's "hoary, melodramatic plotting and painfully awkward dialogue leave nary a cliché untouched."

A review on Common Sense Media gave it one out of five stars stressing that "[u]nless you're a fan of the physical act of the slam dunk (of which there are plenty in this film), there's nothing to recommend in this artless redemption story. Slamma Jamma has a decent message -- hanging onto faith and fortitude is a decisive way to rise from the ashes of youthful 'mistakes' -- but the film itself is weighed down by so many missed opportunities that it's hard to watch."

Bad movie podcast The Flop House unanimously gave the film a "Good-Bad" rating indicating that while the movie is lacking in many regards, its shortcomings make it entertaining in a "so bad it's good" kind of way.
