= Close Call =

- Directed by: Jimmy Lee
- Written by: Jimmy Lee
- Starring: Annie Lee; Philip Moon; Christine Ma
- Release date: April 16, 2004
- Running time: 94 minutes
- Country: United States
- Language: English

Close Call is a 2004 crime-drama film directed by Jimmy Lee. The movie is about Jenny Kim, a 16-year-old Korean American who is caught in an underground world of crimes, drugs and sex.

Writer/director Jimmy Lee is the father of Annie Lee, who played the film's lead character, and Angie Lee, who co-produced the film and played a supporting character.

== Cast ==
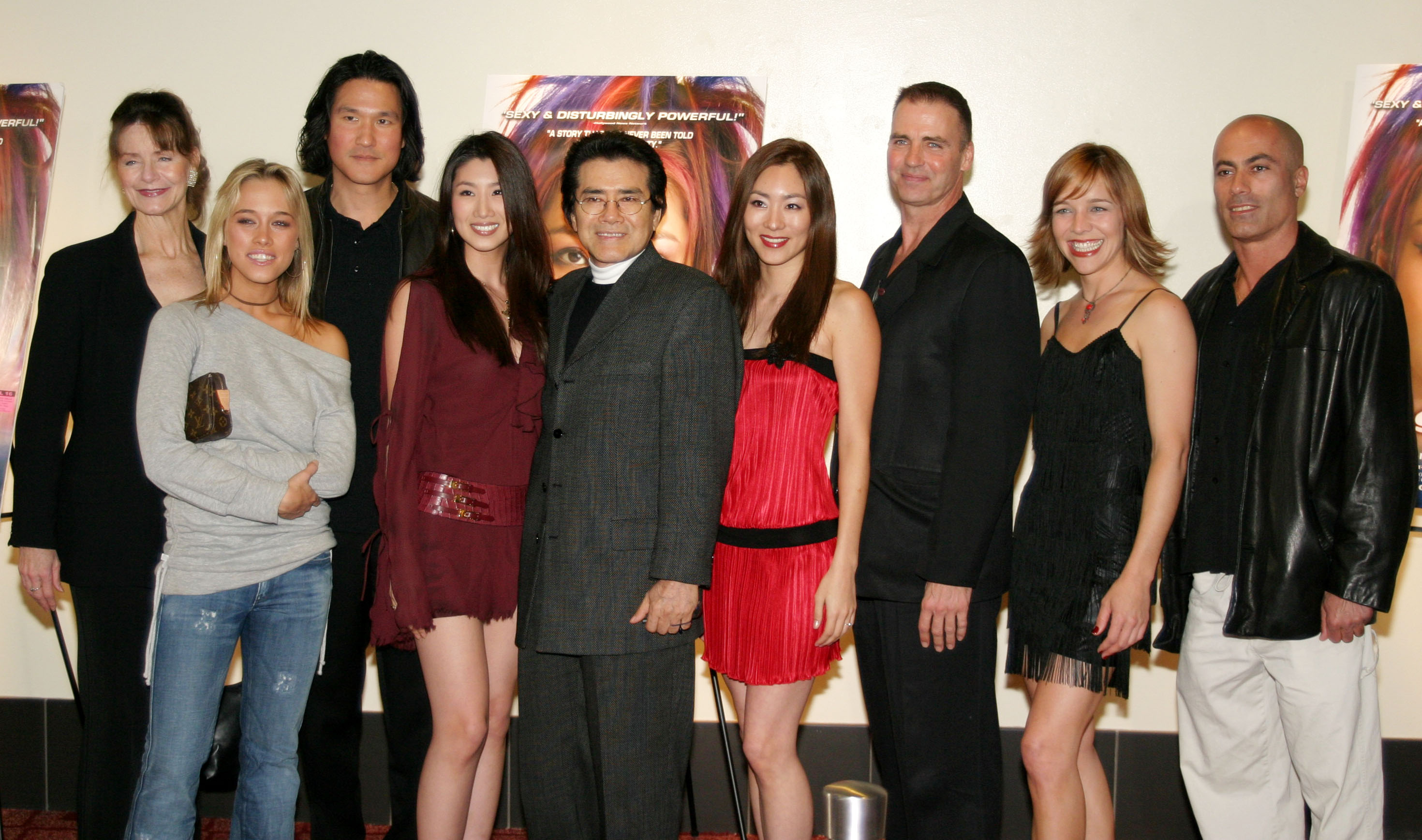
The cast appearing at a premiere.

- Annie Lee - Jenny Kim
- Philip Moon - David Kim
- Christine Ma - Joanne Kim
- Jeff Fahey - Elliot Krasner
- Kaye Lu - Young Jenny
