= Jack Scalia =

American actor (born 1950)

- Born: Giacomo Tomaso Tedesco; November 10, 1950 (age 75); Brooklyn, New York City, U.S.
- Other name: John Scalia
- Occupations: Actor, producer, model
- Years active: 1981–present
- Spouse(s): Joan Rankin (divorced) Karen Baldwin (m. 1987; div. 1996) Edra Scalia
- Children: 2

Jack Scalia (born November 10, 1950) is an American actor. Scalia is perhaps best known for his frequent appearances in prime-time television series (both as a regular and as a guest-star) and television movies in the 1980s and 1990s, as well as feature films.

== Early life ==
Scalia was born Giacomo Tomaso Tedesco in Brooklyn, New York City, of Italian and Irish descent. His father was former Brooklyn Dodger Rocky Tedesco. His parents divorced and when his mother remarried his name was changed to Scalia. In 1969 he graduated from Brentwood High School on Long Island. He was drafted in the first round third overall by the Montreal Expos in 1971 as a pitcher. and moved to AA ball for his second year. However, he then sustained a shoulder injury and never got to play in the majors.

== Acting career ==
After brief stints as a construction worker, and as a factory worker at Campbell's, he began his career as a clothes model, most notably in a series of ads for Eminence briefs and Jordache jeans, both of which capitalized on his "beefcake" appeal. In 1982, to promote his TV series, The Devlin Connection where he plays Rock Hudson's character's son, Scalia took off his shirt and posed, cigarette in hand, for a pin-up wall poster.

Scalia was a regular cast member during the final season of Remington Steele in 1987, after which he joined the cast of Dallas in the role of Nicholas Pearce, love interest to Sue Ellen Ewing (Linda Gray). Scalia's character was killed off at the end of the 1987–1988 season when he fell to his death after being pushed from a balcony during a fight with J. R. Ewing (Larry Hagman). He returned to the series finale in a dream sequence in which he was married to Sue Ellen.

From 1989 to 1990 he starred in another TV series, the CBS crime drama Wolf.

In 1992 Scalia was cast as Detective Nico "Nick" Bonetti in the short-lived television series Tequila and Bonetti. Scalia replaced another actor in the role during production of the show's first episode. Eight years later, in 2000, Scalia reprised the role of Bonetti in a revival of the series, which was filmed and aired in Italy.

From 1994 to 1995 he starred in Pointman, a television series on the Prime Time Entertainment Network. He was an investment banker framed and convicted of fraud. When eventually cleared, Constantine "Connie" Harper becomes the owner of a Florida beach resort, Spanish Pete's, and aids people in need with the use of former prison mates and "the list". He appeared in the 1998 Lorenzo Doumani film Follow Your Heart as a rich playboy in need of a wife.

Scalia is also known for his role as Chris Stamp on All My Children from 2001 to 2003. He was nominated for a Daytime Emmy Award for "Outstanding Lead Actor" for his AMC role in 2002. In 2006, Scalia starred as President Halstrom in The Genius Club for writer/director Tim Chey. The film is about seven geniuses who must try to solve the world's problems in one night.

== Charity work ==
=== Operation American Spirit ===
In 2007 Scalia co-founded Operation American Spirit with Edra Blixseth, now Scalia. The charity was founded to raise awareness and funding for severely injured troops and their families.

The group organized two 1,500-mile bike rides which took place in 2007 and 2008. The rides took place along the West Coast and were intended to raise both awareness and charitable funds for wounded veterans. The tours made stops to interact with veterans at VA hospitals.

=== Coalition to Salute America's Heroes ===
In 2009, while filming The Black Tulip, Scalia spent time visiting servicemen and women. Since then he has been a host or speaker for various events on different military bases. He is currently an ambassador for the Coalition to Salute America's Heroes. The Coalition is a 501(c)(3) charity dedicated to making the lives of wounded veterans returning home to be better prepared for the challenges that lie ahead.

Scalia continues to serve warriors everywhere, including participating in the 2016 Pearl Harbor 75th Anniversary Memorial Parade and hosting the 105th birthday celebration for WWII veteran Ray Chavez. Scalia met the 104-year-old Chavez on the USS Missouri in December 2016 when he hosted an event to commemorate the 75th Anniversary of Pearl Harbor (which included the governors of Hawaii and Arizona). After the event Scalia, 9/11 firefighter Joe Torrillo, and patriotic rocker Jeff Senour came up with the ultimate honor for Chavez. On March 11, 2017, more than 600 people were treated to a patriotic concert in Chavez' honor, as the oldest living Pearl Harbor veteran was showered with presents, a four-foot cake, letters from one sitting and four past U.S. Presidents, and an outpouring of love and national media attention.

In a 2017 interview on Good Day New York, Scalia talked about his multiple tours to Mosul for humanitarian missions.

== Personal life ==
He is currently married to Edra Scalia, Co-founder of Yellowstone Club and Developer of Porcupine Creek. He was previously married to former model Joan Rankin and to 1982 Miss Universe Karen Baldwin, with whom he has two daughters.

== Filmography ==
Year	Title	Role	Notes
1981	The Star Maker	Vince Martino	TV movie
1982	The Devlin Connection	Nick Corsello	All 13 episodes
1983	High Performance	Blue Stratton	All 4 episodes
1984	Amazons	Lieutenant Tony Monaco	TV movie
1984	Fear City	Nicky Parzeno	Film
1985	Hollywood Beat	Detective Nick McCarren	All 14 episodes
1985	Berrenger's	Danny Krucek	All 11 episodes
1985	The Other Lover	Jack Hollander	TV movie
1986	Club Med	O'Shea	TV movie
1987	Remington Steele	Tony Roselli	6 episodes (5.01-5.06)
1987	I'll Take Manhattan	Rocco Cipriani	TV mini-series
1987–1991	Dallas	Nicholas Pearce	29 episodes
1989–1990	Wolf	Tony Wolf	All 12 episodes
1990	The Rift	Wick Hayes	Film
1990	After the Shock	Jack Thompson	TV movie
1990	Donor	Dr. Eugene Kesselman	TV movie
1991	Deadly Desire	Frank Decker	TV movie
1991	Ring of Scorpio	Richard Devereaux	TV mini-series
1991	Runaway Father	John Payton	TV movie
1992	Tequila & Bonetti	Detective Nick Bonetti	All 11 episodes
1992	Illicit Behavior	Mike Yarnell	Film
1992	With a Vengeance	Mike Barcetti	TV movie
1992	Lady Boss	Lennie Golden	TV mini-series
1993	Casualties of Love: The "Long Island Lolita" Story	Joey Buttafuoco	TV movie
1993	Torch Song	Mike Lanahan	TV movie
1993	Amore!	Saul Schwartz	Film
1994	Shattered Image	Brian Dillon	TV movie
1994	Pointman	Connie Harper	TV movie
1994	Stalker: Shadow of Obsession	Carvella	TV movie
1994	Beyond Suspicion	Detective Vince Morgan	TV movie
1994	T-Force	Lieutenant Jack Floyd	Film
1995	Pointman	Connie Harper	All 22 episodes
1995	Tall, Dark and Deadly	Roy Calvin	TV movie
1995	Touched by an Angel	Max Chamberlain	Episode 2.09 "The Big Bang"
1995	P.C.H.	Daniel St. Germain	TV movie
1996	The Silencers	Rafferty	Film
1996	Storybook	Brandon's Father	Film
1996	Dark Breed	Captain Nick Saxon	Film
1996	Everything to Gain	Detective Michael DeMarco	TV movie
1997	Under Oath	Nick Hollit	Film
1997	Fired Up	Frank Reynolds	Episode 2.05 "Total Recall"
1998	Hell Mountain	Garrett	Film
1998	Sweet Deception	Brett Newcomb	TV movie
1998	Mel	Bailey Silverwood	Film
1998	The Last Leprechaun	Henry Barridge	Film
1998	Charades	Barry	Film
1998	Act of War	Jack Gracy	Film
1999	Follow Your Heart	Scott Thompson	Direct to video
1999	Silent Predators	Max Farrington	TV movie
2000	Ground Zero	Michael Brandeis	Film
2000	Tequila & Bonetti (Italian remake)	Detective Nick Bonetti	All 14 episodes
2001	Boys Klub	The Boss	Film
2001–2003	All My Children	Chris Stamp	153 episodes
2002	Shattered Lies	Captain Sterling	Film
2003	Hollywood Wives: The New Generation	Michael Scorsinni	TV movie
2005	Red Eye	Deputy Secretary of Homeland Security Charles Keefe	Film
2005	McBride: Anybody Here Murder Marty?	Marty Caine	TV movie
2005	Taylor	Mark Sullivan	Film
2006	End Game	The President	Film
2006	Honeymoon with Mom	Nick Tercel	Film
2006	Kraken: Tentacles of the Deep	Maxwell Odemus	TV movie
2006	The Genius Club	The President	Film
2007	Finishing the Game	Agent #1	Film
2007	Nuclear Hurricane	Rusty	TV movie
2008	Chicano Blood	Detective Samuel	Direct to video
2010	Black Widow	Sean McMurphy	Film
2010	The Black Tulip	Colonel Williams	Film
2012	Jersey Shore Shark Attack	Sheriff Moretti	TV movie
2012	Parks and Recreation	Howard Kurtzwilder	Episode 5.05 "Halloween Surprise"
2012	The Dog Who Saved the Holidays	Tony Rowe	TV movie
2013	The Thanksgiving House	John Ross	TV movie
2013	The Neighbors	Suave Older Man	Episode 2.09 "Thanksgiving is No Schmuck Bait"
2014	Revolution	Bill Harlow	Episode 2.10 "The Three Amigos"
2017–2018	Saints & Sinners	Nicholas McGrail	4 episodes (2.01–3.08)
2020	Chronicle of a Serial Killer	Captain Anderson	Film
2021	The Story of Spinning		Film short
2025	Birth of the Black Underworld	Vincent Maranzano	Film
