= Annie Lee (actress) =

American actress

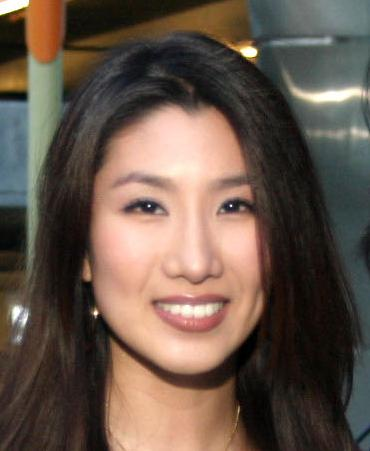
- Occupation: Actress

Annie Lee is an American actress.

== Career ==
As an actress, Lee appeared in the Rose of Sharon directed by Elliot Hong and the independent film Close Call, which was directed by her father and where she played the lead character.

Lee also began working in production and distribution of entertainment through various producers and film companies. As a filmmaker, Lee produced a short film titled Tomato and Eggs, directed by Shawn Chou, starring Michelle Krusiec, Keiko Agena and Sab Shimono. The film won the Audience Award for Best Asian-American Short Film at the Big Bear Lake International Film Festival.

== Filmography ==
=== Film ===
Year	Title	Role	Notes
2004	Close Call	Jenny Kim	
2006	The Rose of Sharon	Mina Sohn	
2007	Mouse, a Love Story	Stacy	
2008	The Sights and Smells of Joey Guila	Dr. Annie Lee	
2008	Live Fast, Die Young	Michelle Lee	
2011	Suing the Devil	Ms. Black	
2022	Father Stu	Dr. Wan	

=== Television ===
Year	Title	Role	Notes
2008	The Game	Manicurist	Episode: "Take These Vows and Shove 'Em!"
2008	I Didn't Know I Was Pregnant	Doctor	Episode: "Special #1"
2012	Parenthood	Female Technician	Episode: "Left Field"
2013	NCIS: Los Angeles	FBI Agent / Hostess	Episode: "Iron Curtain Rising"
2014	The Bold and the Beautiful	Paramedic #1	Episode #1.6768
2016	Broad City	Flight Attendant	2 episodes
2016	Single by 30	Wedding Planner	Episode: "All My Life"
2018	Shooter	Young Mom	Episode: "Patron Saint"
2021	9-1-1	Claire	Episode: "Defend in Place"
2022	Kenan	Woman #1	Episode: "Workaholic"
2022	Pam & Tommy	Reporter	Episode: "I Love You, Tommy"
