= Theatre 68 =

American theatre company

Theatre 68 is a for profit theatre company located in North Hollywood, California. It is dedicated to showcasing the works of up-and-coming playwrights, directors, producers, and performers.

Theatre 68 is regarded as one of the top 99-seat theaters in Los Angeles, and is most recognized as the home to an annual Haunted House, five 6-month runs of Bill W and Dr. Bob, and an 8th month run of I Am Not A Comedian...I'm Lenny Bruce directed by Joe Mantegna, written by and starring Ronnie Marmo as Lenny Bruce.

Theatre 68 is the home to the Los Angeles chapter of the 68 Cent Crew Theatre Company, founded on February 14, 2001 by Ronnie Marmo, Tommy Colavito, Danny Cistone, Tyler Christopher, and Katie Mushlin. The New York City chapter of the 68 Cent Crew was founded on August 29, 2011, and is based at Tony Award Honored Drama Book Shop Inc. The artistic director is Ronnie Marmo.

== Past productions ==
=== Comedies ===
Theatre 68 is home to the first John Patrick Shanley's 13 by Shanley festival, celebrating the playwrights most famous plays. While running in repertory for six months, this festival produced all plays from the 13 by Shanley book, and has since produced world premieres of original material from the playwright.

A Very Merry Happy Kosher Christmas (World Premiere) by Mark Troy

Lenny Bruce is Back by Sam Bobrick and Julie Stein (Two 6-month runs)

Lost In Radioland (World Premiere) by Ryan Paul James and Denny Siegel

Dash Riprock and the Tentacles of Doom (World Premiere) by Mark Wilson

House of Yes by Wendy MacLeod

Love, Sex and the IRS by Billy Van Zandt and Jane Milmore

Lovers and Other Strangers by Renée Taylor and Joseph Bologna

Much A Jew About Nothin' (World Premiere) by Mark Troy

Night Stories, A Radio Play (World Premiere) by Ryan Paul James and Denny Siegel

Resting in Pieces (World Premiere) by Sam Bobrick

Saint Nick (World Premiere) by Ronnie Marmo

The Boys Next Door by Tom Griffin

West of Brooklyn (World Premiere) by Ronnie Marmo

What the Rabbi Saw by Billy Van Zandt and Jane Milmore

=== Dramas ===
A New War by Gip Hope

After Hours (World Premiere) by E.M. Hodge

Bent by Martin Sherman

Bill W and Dr. Bob by Samuel Shem and Janet Surrey (five 6 month runs)

Eyes for Consuela by Sam Shepard

Exit 10 by Daniel Dean Darst

Five by Tenn by Tennessee Williams

The Last Days of Judas Iscariot by Stephen Adly Guirgis

Last Night In the Garden I Saw You (World Premiere) by John Patrick Shanley

Passing Proper by Joe Massengil

The Busy World Is Hushed by Keith Bunin

The Knights of Mary Phagan by Jesse Waldinger
