= Anna Lee (disambiguation) =

Anna Lee (1913–2004) was a British-born American actress

Anna Lee may also refer to:

- Anna Lee (violinist) (born 1995), Korean-American violinist
- Anna Lee (TV series), a 1993 British crime drama
- "Anna Lee", a song by Dream Theater from their album Falling Into Infinity

== See also ==
- Annalee (disambiguation)
- Anne Lee (disambiguation)
