= Annalee Yassi =

Canadian health scholar

Annalee Yassi is a Canadian health scholar, currently a Canada Research Chair in Global Health and Capacity Building at University of British Columbia.
