= Tempting Fate (1998 film) =

- Genre: Science fiction
- Written by: Gerald DiPego; Justin DiPego
- Directed by: Peter Werner
- Starring: Tate Donovan; Abraham Benrubi; Ming-Na Wen
- Music by: Martin Davich
- Country of origin: United States
- Original language: English

Production
- Executive producers: Sheri Singer; Steve White
- Producer: Ron Gilbert
- Cinematography: Neil Roach
- Editor: Martin Nicholson
- Running time: 96 minutes
- Production company: Singer White Entertainment

Original release
- Network: ABC
- Release: April 5, 1998

Tempting Fate is a 1998 American science fiction television film starring Tate Donovan and directed by Peter Werner.

== Plot ==
A Los Angeles scientist discovers a parallel Earth where everything is peaceful and Elvis Presley is still alive.

== Cast ==
- Tate Donovan as Dr. Ben Creed
- Abraham Benrubi as John Bollandine
- Matt Craven as Emmett Lach
- Philip Baker Hall as Dr. Bardwell
- Ming-Na Wen as Ellen Moretti
