= Suing the Devil =

- Theatrical release poster
- Directed by: Tim Chey
- Written by: Tim Chey
- Produced by: David Turrell
- Starring: Malcolm McDowell; Tom Sizemore
- Cinematography: Tom Gleeson
- Edited by: Tim Chey
- Music by: David Turrell
- Distributed by: Mouthwatering Productions
- Release date: 26 August 2011
- Running time: 106 minutes
- Countries: Australia; United States
- Language: English

Suing the Devil is a 2010 Christian thriller film which was released in 2011. It was written and directed by Tim Chey and stars Malcolm McDowell and Tom Sizemore.

== Plot ==
Luke O'Brien (Bart Bronson), a washed-up salesman turned night law student, decides to sue Satan for 8 trillion dollars. On the last day before Luke files a default judgment, Satan (Malcolm McDowell) appears to defend himself. On Satan's legal team are ten of the world's best trial lawyers. The entire world watches on Justice TV to see who will win the Trial of the Century. In the end, Luke wins the suit after a sensational proceeding. However, the film ends by showing that everything was a dream.

== Cast ==
- Malcolm McDowell as Satan
- Shannen Fields as Gwen O'Brien
- Corbin Bernsen as Barry Polk
- Tom Sizemore as Tony "The Hip" Anzaldo
- Bart Bronson as Luke O'Brien
- Rebecca St. James as Jasmine Williams

== Production ==
Filming took place in Burbank, Los Angeles, Darlinghurst in New South Wales, and Sydney.

== Release ==
Suing the Devil was released internationally in Brazil, UK, Canada, Australia, and Nigeria. The film was distributed on demand through a variety of services in the US and Canada.

=== Accolades ===
The film won the 5-Dove Award from the Dove Foundation, their highest rating for a "family approved" film.

=== Critical reception ===
Some critical reviews were negative. For example, Gabe Toro of Indiewire wrote: "The ideas behind the film are laughably primitive, and it's startling to see an actor of McDowell's caliber swept up in them. At the point where Satan begins taking credit for gangsta rap, it's clear that the ignorance that powers this film is borderline dangerous... In short, it's embarrassing on almost every level, poorly written, shot, scored and edited and bereft of a single idea, interesting or otherwise." Toro gave it a letter grade of F.

In a review for The A.V. Club by Nathan Rabin wrote that "[t]hanks almost entirely to McDowell, Suing The Devil is one of the most entertaining evangelical Christian films I've written about for this column. Unlike most godly epics, it has a sense of humor about itself, but the laughs it generates are largely of the unintentional variety. It's sweet, dopey, and strangely touching in its fuzzy but strong-headed conviction that with a whole lot of faith and Jesus' love inside him, a no-hoper of a lawyer could triumph over the ultimate evil."
