= Ang Li =

Ang Li may refer to:

- Ang Lee (born 1954), Taiwanese-born American film director
- Ang Li (pianist) (born 1985), Chinese classical pianist

== See also ==
- Li Ang (disambiguation)
- Ann Li (disambiguation)
