= Annalee Davis =

Barbadian artist

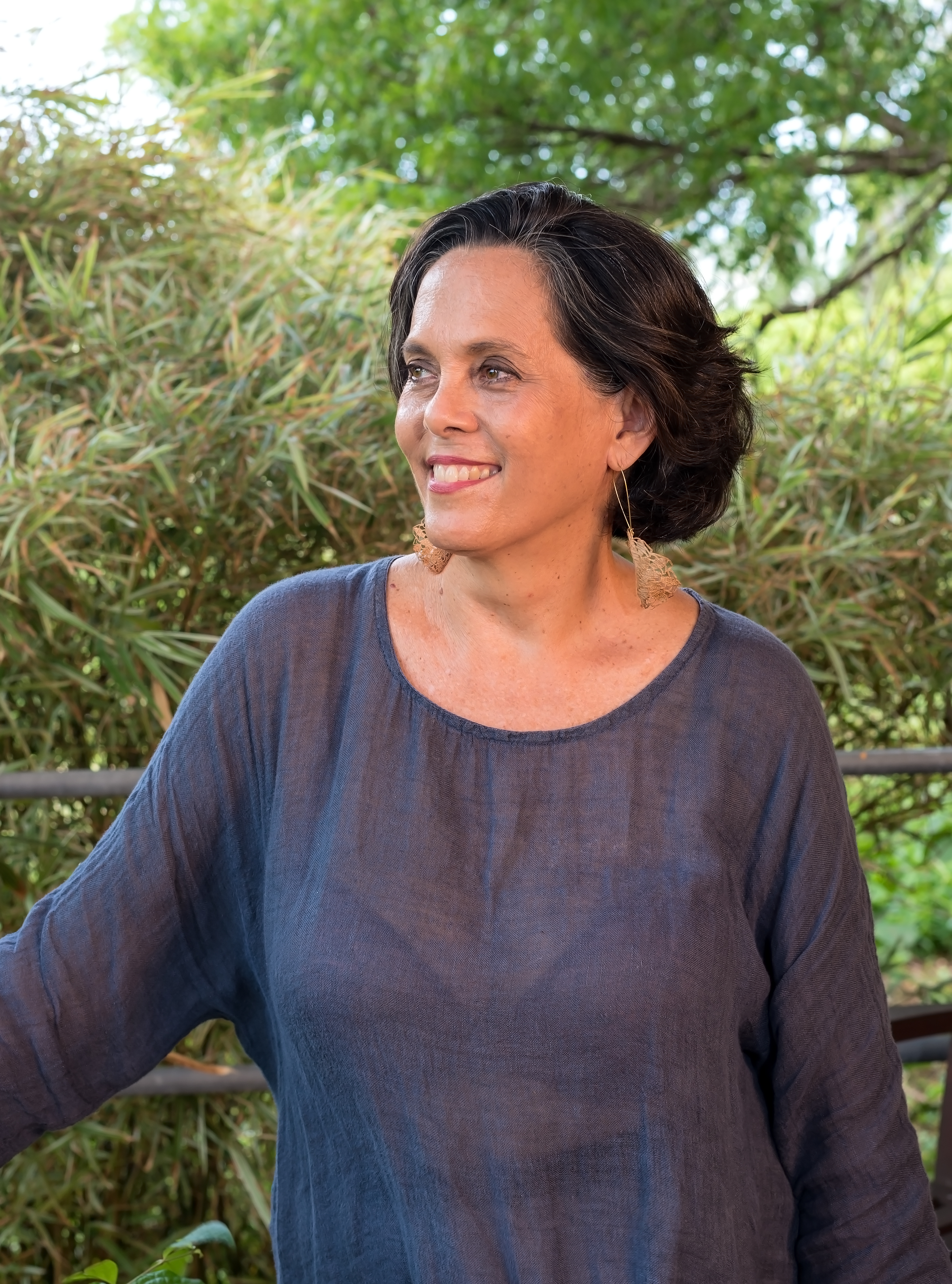
- Born: 19 October 1963 (age 62); St. Michael, Barbados
- Occupations: Drawing, Painting, Object Making, Art Installation, Video Producer.

Annalee Davis (born 1963) is a visual artist from Barbados whose occupation consists of drawing, painting, object making, art installation and video production. She works a hybrid practice of jobs as a visual artist, instigator, cultural producer, educator and writer. Davis works on the intersection of biography and history, focusing on post-plantation economies by engaging with a particular landscape on Barbados. Concerned with representing migratory displacement, postcolonial recovery, and conceptions of "longing and belonging", Davis uses art and form to capture "an understanding of the shifting terrain in our minds and on our lands, through video, wall-based work, and installations."

== Early life and education ==
Annalee Davis was born on 19 October 1963 in St. Michael, Barbados. She spent her childhood growing up on a series of sugar cane plantations. Her first home was at the state-owned plantation, Graeme Hall in Christ Church, the family then moved to Sandford Plantation in St. Philip and finally to Cliff Plantation in St. John. Her father, a planter, and her mother raised the family of five children.

After attending primary and secondary school in Barbados, Davis earned her BFA from the Maryland Institute, College of Art in Baltimore, Maryland (1982-1986) and went on to the Mason Gross School for the Arts, Rutgers University, The State University of New Jersey, New Brunswick campus (1987-1989) where she earned her MFA. Upon graduating from Rutgers, she returned to Barbados to take up a teaching post at The St. Michael Secondary School (1989-1991).

== Career ==
In 1991, Davis left The St. Michael Secondary School to take up a short-term consulting job at the Edna Manley School for the Visual Arts to design a 4-year Printmaking degree program. She then began traveling around the Caribbean meeting fellow artists, becoming part of a larger regional arts community by building relations with her peers in the Anglophone, Hispanophone and Dutch Antilles. In 1992, she was part of a small group of artists agitating for change in the Barbadian arts landscape. Together, they co-founded Representing Artists, an arts collective and union for local artists. She became editor of its quarterly Caribbean arts newsletter RA (Representing Artists) which produced six issues from 1992-1994.

Davis' work then moved from painting and printmaking into installation and video art, and concerns itself with "post-plantation economies" and the transformation of Barbados from forests to sugarcane farms to a tourist destination. Much of her work uses mixed media installation to explore the Caribbean experience of identity as one that is mitigated by constant migration. Some of her works include To Hang and to Hold (1998 acrylic painting on canvas with galvanized wire) and And Knitting Them Together (1998 painting using acrylics, cotton, and paper on canvas). She has also made work that explores the postcolonial relationship to food production in her native Barbados, in a 2016 performance entitled (bush) Tea Services.

In 2010, it was announced that Davis would be the first art exhibition curator for the Caribbean Studies Association Annual Conference, where a collective of 500 scholars, activists, artists and writers from the Caribbean and the Diaspora gathered under the theme "Understanding the Everyday Occurrence of Violence in the Cultural Life of the Caribbean: Where Do We Go from Here?".

Davis is known for forming several art collectives focused on the Caribbean region's traumatic colonial past and healing historical trauma through the mediums of art and plant rejuvenation. She formed Fresh Milk, an arts platform and micro-residency program, in 2011. In 2012 she co-founded Caribbean Linked, an annual residency in Aruba, cohering emerging artists, writers and curators from the Caribbean and Latin America. In 2015, she co-founded Tilting Axis, an independent visual arts platform bridging the Caribbean through annual encounters. From 2016-2018, she was Caribbean Arts Manager with the British Council, developing programming in Cuba, Jamaica and Trinidad and Tobago and in 2020, she co-founded Sour Grass, a curatorial agency. '

Davis began teaching part-time in the Bachelor of Fine Arts, Visual Arts program at the Barbados Community College from the mid nineties intermittently until 2018.

In February 2023, in collaboration with The Walkers Institute for Regenerative Research Education and Design (WIRRED), Davis curated "Garden of Hope," a visitor garden installation at the former 17th century Hope Plantation on the Walkers Reserve in Barbados. The efforts of The Walkers Institute and Davis speak to a shared commitment toward the rejuvenation of the historic space, with the garden now repurposed as a sacred plot of hope and natural apothecary centered on female reproductive health.

The Nasher Museum of Art at Duke University, North Carolina, included Davis's work in the collective exhibition and accompanying publication Spirit in the Land, in 2023. In 2024, the show is traveling to the Pérez Art Museum Miami, Florida.

== Personal life ==
Davis' studio is located on a working dairy farm in Barbados which operated historically as a 17th century sugarcane plantation.

== Bibliography ==
- Veerle Poupeye. Caribbean Art. London; Thames and Hudson; 1998.
