= Murder 101 (2014 film) =

- Directed by: Michael Phillip Edwards
- Written by: Sheldon F. Robins
- Produced by: Sheldon F. Robins
- Starring: Tom Sizemore; Dante Basco; Sheldon F. Robins; Paige La Pierre; Randy Irwin; Malaak Hattab; Percy Daggs; Greg Winter; Jamison Haase; Rai Moore; Jasmine Waltz
- Cinematography: Paolo Cascio
- Music by: Alec Puro
- Production company: Upper Laventille Productions Inc.
- Release date: June 13, 2014
- Running time: 90 minutes
- Country: United States
- Language: English
- Budget: $1.5 Million

Murder 101 (also stylized as Murder101 and known under the working title of C.L.A.S.S.) is an American horror film that was directed by Michael Phillip Edwards. The film was released to DVD on June 10, 2014 and had a limited theatrical release on June 13, 2014. It stars Tom Sizemore and Paige LaPierre, and follows a female law student that gets caught up in a twisted game of cat and mouse. Filming took place in Los Angeles, California during 2010.

== Synopsis ==
Fiona (Paige LaPierre) is a beautiful and highly intelligent young law student that is eager to take on her latest class, a course in criminology by Professor Mark Sloan (Randy Irwin). She's horror-struck when a series of brutal and seemingly random slayings begin around the campus community, leading Detective Caterson (Sheldon F. Robins) to suspect that it's the work of a mass murderer. Unwilling to watch the deaths keep piling up without doing anything, Fiona decides to investigate the murders- a decision made partially due to fact that her father died at the hands of a mass murderer that was never caught or identified. However, as the murders increase Fiona finds that the victims are closely connected to her life and her past, leading her to suspect that someone close to her is the killer.

== Cast ==
- Tom Sizemore as FBI Agent Ridley
- Paige LaPierre as Fiona
- Randy Irwin as Professor Sloan
- Jamison Haase as Chase
- Greg Winter as AP Bill Peele
- Sheldon F. Robins as Detective Caterson
- Katie Malia as Leslie
- Mike James as Walter
- Rai Moore as Cynda
- Michelle Cimmin as Gigi
- Dante Basco as Deon
- Dominica Westling as Kelly
- Sam Daly as Thomas Reid
- M.J. Karmi as Mrs. Reid
