= Ann Lee (economist) =

Hong Kong-American economist

- Born: 李淯; Hong Kong
- Occupations: Author; Economist

Ann Lee (Chinese: 李淯) is a Hong Kong-born American author and commentator on global economics and finance issues.

== Overview ==
=== Biography ===
Lee was born in Hong Kong to Chinese parents who had escaped from the turmoil of the early years of the PRC; subsequently the family emigrated to the United States. She attended U.C. Berkeley, Princeton University's Woodrow Wilson School of Public and International Affairs, and Harvard Business School (1995). After working for two investments banks, she became a hedge fund partner and a trader in credit derivatives. She also taught at Pace University from 2006 to 2007. From 2010 to 2012 she was a senior fellow at Demos, where she worked on issues of financial regulation and U.S.-China relations.

=== Writing ===
Her book What the U.S. Can Learn from China was published in January 2012 by Berrett-Koehler. The book was described in The Economist magazine, as "calling for a less hostile approach towards the rising Asian power".

Her op-ed pieces and editorials have been published in the Financial Times, Wall Street Journal Newsweek, Business Week, Forbes, Huffington Post, The American Prospect and Institutional Investor.

=== Media appearances ===
She has been a frequent media commentator on economic issues. She has appeared on Bloomberg, CNBC, ABC, CBS, CNN, NPR, VOA, C-SPAN and many foreign stations that include BBC, CCTV-America, Phoenix TV, Al Jazeera, and Swedish TV. She also makes several appearances each year as an invited speaker at industry and academic conferences.

== Publications ==
- Lee, Ann (2012). What the U.S. Can Learn from China. Berrett-Koehler. p. 288. ISBN 9781609941246.
- Lee, Ann (2017). Will China's Economy Collapse?. Wiley. p. 168. ISBN 9781509520138.
