= Annie Lee (artist) =

American artist

Annie Frances Lee (3 March 1935 – 24 November 2014) was an American artist. She is known for her depiction of African-American everyday life. Her work is characterized by images without facial features. She used body language to show emotion and expression in her work. Her most popular paintings are Blue Monday and My Cup Runneth Over.

== Biography ==
Lee was born in Gadsden, Alabama but grew up in Chicago, Illinois. She began painting as a child and won her first competition at the age of 10 but did not start painting professionally until she was 40. Lee attended Wendell Phillips High School on Chicago's South Side. Her artistic accomplishments led her to receive a scholarship to attend Northwestern University but she declined the scholarship to marry and raise a family. By the age of 40, when she began her career as an artist, Lee had lost two husbands to cancer, raised a daughter from her first marriage and a son from her second, and lost a son in an accident in 1986. She enrolled in Loop Junior College and completed her undergraduate to work at Mundelein College and the American Academy of Art.

While working as the chief clerk at Northwestern Railroad, Annie studied art at night for eight years, eventually earning a Master of Education degree from Loyola University. Lee's railroad job inspired one of her most popular paintings, Blue Monday, which depicts a woman struggling to pull herself out of bed on a Monday morning. Her trademarks are the animated emotion of the personalities in the artwork and the faces which are painted without features. At age fifty, Lee had her first gallery show and she allowed prints to be made of four of her original paintings. Using her designs, Lee also developed figurines, high fashion dolls, decorative housewares, and kitchen tiles.

Lee's work reflected her own experiences as well as her observations of those in communities around her. After showing her work in other galleries for a number of years, Lee opened Annie Lee and Friends Gallery in Glenwood, Illinois where she displayed her works as well as the works of other artists. When several of her paintings appeared on the sets of popular television shows such as The Cosby Show and A Different World, the exposure helped popularize her work. Although she regularly received requests for public appearances, Lee preferred to appear at gallery shows; she also enjoyed visiting schools to encourage and inspire students. After many years, Lee left Chicago for Las Vegas. The play Six No Uptown written by L.A. Walker, Terry Horton, and Cassandra Sanders was inspired by Lee's painting of the same name. The play opened in Las Vegas in 2014 and centers around a Bid Whist card game, Lee's game of choice.

=== Philanthropy and the Annie F. Lee Art Foundation ===
Over the decades, Lee has been a supporter of the Tom Joyner Foundation. She donated her time and artwork to help the Foundation raise money to keep students at Historically Black Colleges and Universities. Her painting Higher Education: A Way to Soar painting celebrates the successes of the students at these colleges. The painting White Night painting captures the elegance and whimsy of one of the theme nights on board the Fantastic Voyage, an annual weeklong cruise that is a fundraiser for the Foundation and on which she was a regular exhibitor.

The Tom Joyner Foundation developed a partnership with Annie Lee in 2000 and the Joyner Foundation lists her "Artist, Humorist, Humanitarian, Icon. They honored her and wrote;

"Annie Lee has established herself internationally not only as an artist, but a respected and business savvy entrepreneur. Her noted ability to convey feelings through the faceless subjects of her paintings has won her a place in history as one of the icons of African American art. Annie is as iconic to the world of African American art as Michael Jordan is to basketball. She has rightfully earned her place among the great artists of our race. Her success is not only based on her skill as a painter, but on her ability to touch us at our core. Her art reflects on our history, our families, our struggles, our joy, our strengths, our weaknesses, our pride, our idiosyncrasies and on the faith that sustains us The Joyner Foundation emphasized, she is "OUR" Annie Lee."

The Annie F. Lee Art Foundation (AFL35) was incorporated in 2015 by Lee's grandson, Abe Ilo, Sr. president/co-founder of ALP - Annie Lee Presents. The mission of the Foundation is, "to continue Annie's heritage of creativity and charity. Annie appreciated being able to help people; she donated her time, influence, money, food, home, and paintings. With her artistic talent, Annie dramatically transformed her life and the life of those that she encountered. Using the power of artistic expression to advocate self-awareness, self-respect, and also create opportunity and positive change is paramount to who Annie Lee was, and what her legacy should be all about."

She died in the Las Vegas area at age 79.

== Selected works ==
=== Blue Monday ===
Blue Monday was painted in 1985, in Chicago. The painting shows a tired, faceless Black woman sitting on the edge of her bed about start her workday. The artist first conceived of the painting while getting ready to catch a bus to work on a cold winter morning.

As of 2011, Blue Monday was the most mass-produced and popular painting of the artist.

==== In popular culture ====
Musical artist Lizzo paid a visual tribute to Blue Monday during her December 17, 2022 Saturday Night Live appearance.
