= Annalee Blysse =

American novelist

Annalee Blysse is an American paranormal romance novelist. Born and raised in Alaska, she recently moved to Nevada. She writes romances, and erotic romance, especially futuristic and paranormal.

== Selected works ==
Novels

- Starlit Destiny (2005) - Nominee for 2005 CAPA for Paranormal Romance at The Romance Studio

Novellas

- "Lord of the Night" in Relic (2006)
- Never A Sunset (2005)
