= Tom Sizemore =

American actor (1961–2023)

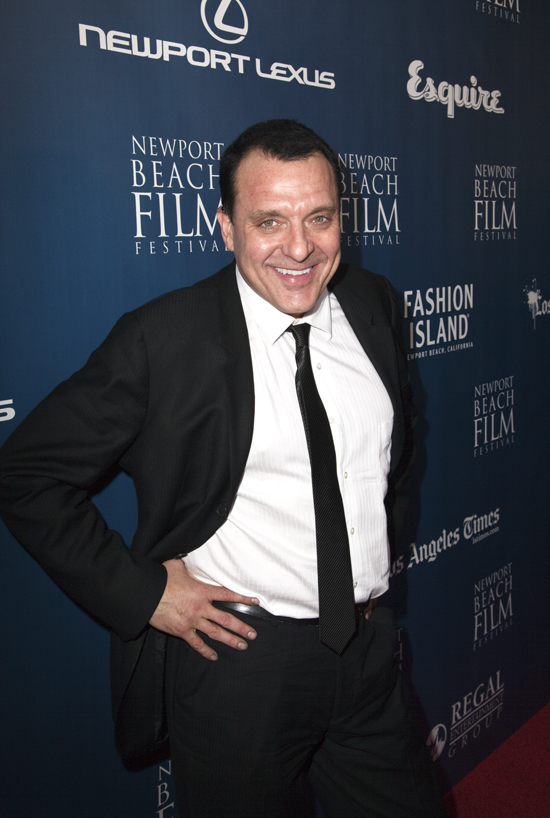
- Sizemore in 2011
- Born: Thomas Edward Sizemore Jr. November 29, 1961; Detroit, Michigan, U.S.
- Died: March 3, 2023 (aged 61); Burbank, California, U.S.
- Education: Wayne State University (BA); Temple University (MFA)
- Occupations: Actor; film producer
- Years active: 1989–2023
- Spouse: Maeve Quinlan (m. 1996; div. 1999)
- Partners: Heidi Fleiss (1999–2003); Janelle McIntire (2005–06)

Thomas Edward Sizemore Jr. (/ˈsaɪzmɔːr/; November 29, 1961 – March 3, 2023) was an American actor. Born in Detroit, he started his career with supporting appearances in Born on the Fourth of July (1989), Lock Up (1989), and Blue Steel (1990). The appearances led to more prominent roles in films like Passenger 57 (1992), True Romance (1993), Striking Distance (1993), Natural Born Killers (1994), Strange Days (1995), Heat (1995), and The Relic (1997).

In 1998, Sizemore starred in Saving Private Ryan, his most commercially successful film. He later appeared in Bringing Out the Dead (1999), Black Hawk Down (2001), and Pearl Harbor (2001). He received a Golden Globe nomination for his lead role in the television film Witness Protection (1999). He also provided the voice of mobster Sonny Forelli in the acclaimed 2002 video game Grand Theft Auto: Vice City.

In 2007, VH1 aired the reality series Shooting Sizemore (2007), which depicted Sizemore's struggle to regain his career amid addictions to methamphetamine and heroin. He also participated in other reality series related to his addiction, including Celebrity Rehab with Dr. Drew (2010) and Celebrity Rehab Presents Sober House (2010). He appeared in the revival series of Twin Peaks (2017).

== Early life and education ==
Thomas Edward Sizemore Jr. was born on November 29, 1961 in Detroit. His mother, Judith (née Schannault), was a member of the city of Detroit ombudsman staff and his father, Thomas Edward Sizemore Sr., was a lawyer and philosophy professor. Thomas Jr. grew up as a Catholic and his parents divorced when he was a teenager. Thomas Sizemore Jr. said that his maternal grandfather was of French and Native American ancestry and also that his grandfather was African-American. He graduated from Wayne State University near downtown Detroit in 1983; he earned a bachelor's degree in Theater there. He received a master's degree from Temple University in Philadelphia in 1986.

== Career ==
One of Sizemore's earliest film roles was in Oliver Stone's Born on the Fourth of July (1989). His other early appearances included Lock Up (1989), Harley Davidson and the Marlboro Man (1991), Point Break (1991), Passenger 57 (1992), True Romance (1993), Striking Distance (1993), Natural Born Killers (1994), and Strange Days (1995). He had a recurring role on the television series China Beach (1988–1991) as an enlisted man named Vinnie who was in love with Dana Delany's character. For his performance in Heart and Souls (1993), he was nominated for the Saturn Award for Best Supporting Actor. He starred in the independent drama film Love Is Like That (1993) with actress and model Pamela Gidley and had a supporting role in Kevin Costner's Wyatt Earp (1994) as Bat Masterson.

A succession of well-received supporting parts followed, beginning with his portrayal of Michael Cheritto in the heist film Heat (1995). Sizemore's first major leading role was as Vincent D'Agosta in The Relic (1997). Sizemore continued to play leading and character parts in Devil in a Blue Dress (1995), Bringing Out the Dead (1999), and Witness Protection (1999). In Saving Private Ryan (1998), he played against type—"one of cinema's scariest sleazebags cast as a soft-spoken guardian of civilization". He also had an uncredited role in Enemy of the State (1998). In the early 2000s, he appeared in the action films Pearl Harbor (2001), which also starred Ben Affleck and Ridley Scott's Black Hawk Down (2001). Sizemore had a voice role as Sonny Forelli in the video game Grand Theft Auto: Vice City. He starred in Ticker (2001), an action film directed by Albert Pyun, with Steven Seagal and Dennis Hopper. Sizemore also starred in the well-reviewed but short-lived television drama series Robbery Homicide Division (2002–2003). He appeared in the Mel Gibson-produced Paparazzi (2004), played Pete Rose in Hustle (2004) depicting his illegal gambling while managing the Cincinnati Reds, and played an undercover cop in Swindle (2006), opposite Sherilyn Fenn.

In the same year, Sizemore starred in The Genius Club (2006), playing a terrorist who taunts seven geniuses into solving the world's problems in one night. He had a leading role in the action/thriller film Splinter (2006) with Edward James Olmos. The next year, television network VH1 aired a six-episode reality TV series called Shooting Sizemore (2007), depicting the actor's life as he struggled to regain his career in the midst of battling long-standing addictions to methamphetamine and heroin. The series also covered an ongoing legal appeal of his conviction for an assault of former Hollywood madam Heidi Fleiss. In the same year, the actor starred in the indie drama film Oranges (2007) with Tom Arnold and Jill Hennessy, which was directed by Syrian director and producer Joseph Merhi. Sizemore performed in two films that screened at the 2008 Sundance Film Festival, Red (2008) and American Son (2008). He was highly prolific that year starring in The Last Lullaby (2008), The Flyboys (2008) with Stephen Baldwin, action film Stiletto (2008) with Tom Berenger and Michael Biehn, drama film Toxic (2008) with Costas Mandylor, and the Canadian drama A Broken Life (2008) with Ving Rhames.

Sizemore appeared in five episodes of the television series Crash (2008–2009) with Dennis Hopper and the comedy film Super Capers (2009). Sizemore starred in the indie horror film Murder 101 (2014) and co-starred with Kyra Sedgwick and Vincent D'Onofrio in the comedy-drama film Chlorine (2013). Sizemore starred alongside martial arts actor Mark Dacascos in the action film Shadows in Paradise (2010), followed by an appearance as a trucker in an episode of It's Always Sunny in Philadelphia. Sizemore appeared alongside the Insane Clown Posse in the comedy film Big Money Rustlas (2010) and the heist thriller Five Thirteen with Taryn Manning. He had roles in the films Suing the Devil (2011) and White Knight (2011), as well as the adventure film The Age of Reason (2014). He had a career resurgence when he was cast as a series regular in the USA Network action program Shooter (2016), starring Ryan Phillippe. Sizemore received positive notices for the drama thriller Calico Skies (2016). In 2017, he appeared as insurance agent Anthony Sinclair in David Lynch's revival miniseries Twin Peaks, and portrayed FBI Agent Bill Sullivan in the drama film Mark Felt: The Man Who Brought Down the White House. Sizemore acted in an indie action film entitled The Assault (2017) with Jordan Ladd.

In 2020, Sizemore appeared in C.L.E.A.N., a thriller/horror indie film and won a Vegas Movie Award; in 2021 he won another Vegas Movie Award for his supporting role in indie film The Electric Man with Vernon Wells and Eric Roberts. In 2022, Sizemore won also an IndieFEST Film Award and Accolade Competition Award for his supporting role in The Electric Man. In January 2022, he joined the cast of The Legend of Jack and Diane, a feature film described as a female-fronted revenge thriller, directed and written by Bruce Bellocchi. Also in 2022, Sizemore starred in the comedy series Barbee Rehab, alongside Bai Ling and Janice Dickinson.

=== Music ===
Sizemore fronted the Hollywood rock band Day 8. Formed in 2002, the band recorded a four-song EP produced and recorded by Bradley Dujmovic and former Snot/Soulfly guitarist Mike Doling. Originally called the Bystanders, the group included guitarist and co-writer Rod Castro, Alan Muffterson, Tyrone Tomke, and Michael Taylor.

== Personal life ==
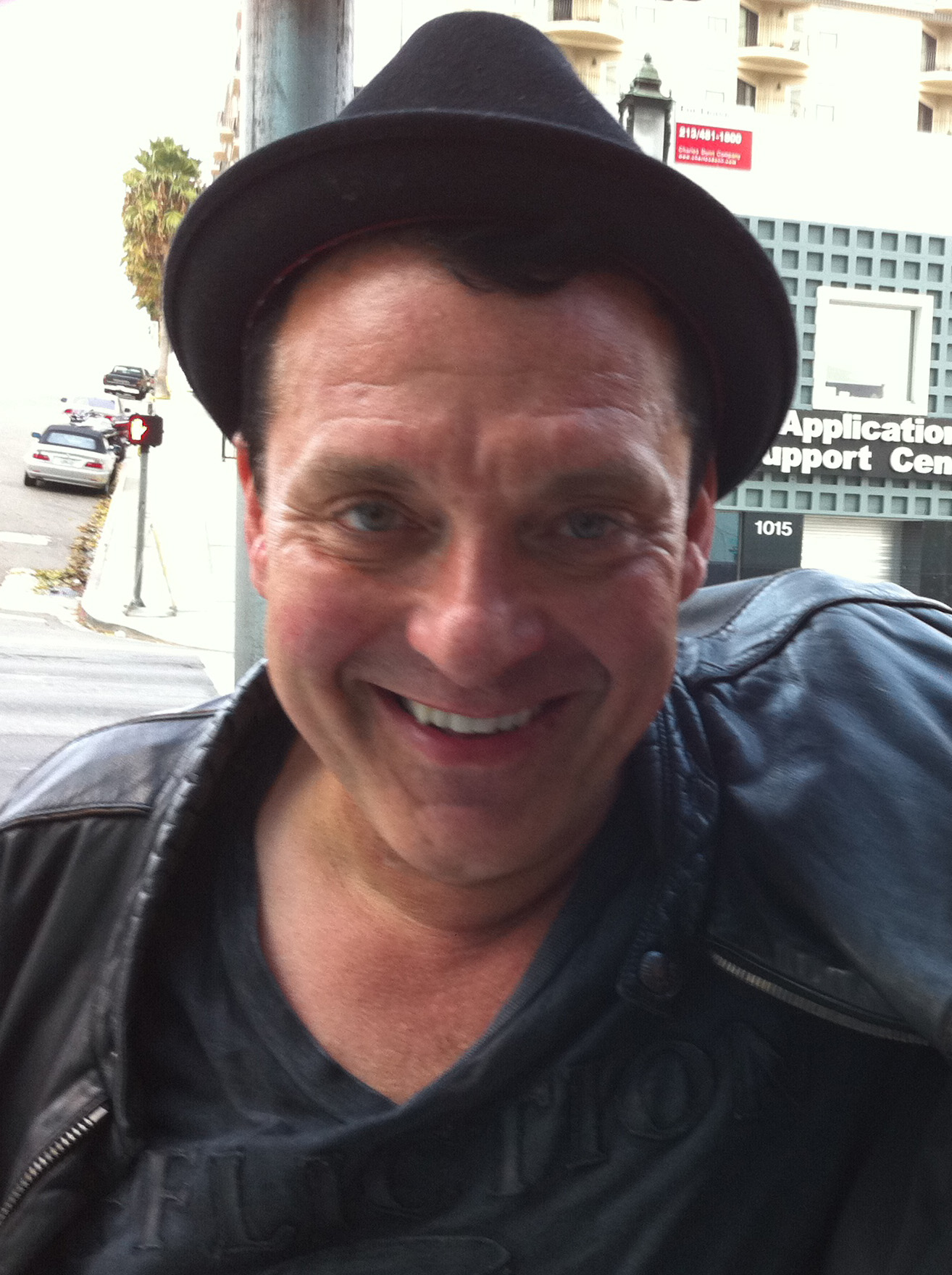
Sizemore on Wilshire Boulevard in LA, October 2010

Sizemore married actress Maeve Quinlan in 1996. They divorced in 1999 because of Sizemore's drug problems. He dated Heidi Fleiss, known as the onetime "Hollywood Madam". Sizemore had twin sons from a previous relationship, born in 2005.

On October 19, 2005, Vivid Entertainment released The Tom Sizemore Sex Scandal, a pornographic video featuring Sizemore and three women. In the video, Sizemore claimed to have had sex with Paris Hilton. Hilton denied his claim and said it was a ploy by Sizemore to increase sales of the video.

=== Substance abuse and legal issues ===
Sizemore said that he battled drug addiction from age 15.

In 2003, Sizemore was convicted of domestic violence against ex-girlfriend Heidi Fleiss. On March 25, 2005, he was sentenced to seven months in jail and four months of drug treatment for repeatedly failing drug tests while on probation. He was caught attempting to fake a urine test using a Whizzinator. Fleiss' restraining order against him lapsed by 2010.

On May 8, 2007, while still on probation for a previous drug conviction, he was arrested outside the Four Points Sheraton hotel in Bakersfield, California, for possession of methamphetamine.

In 2010, Sizemore appeared as a patient/castmember on VH1's third season of Celebrity Rehab with Dr. Drew. Because Fleiss was also in treatment on the show that season, both she and Sizemore had to consent to appear together. His reunion with Fleiss was amicable.

In 2013, he appeared on the episode "Explosive Relationships" of the talk show Dr. Phil in which he discussed his rise to stardom and the subsequent fallout after his years of struggling with substance abuse. Also in 2013, Sizemore claimed in an interview that he had begun to achieve sobriety after a stern interrogation from fellow actor Robert De Niro. De Niro personally checked Sizemore into rehabilitation.

In early 2014, a recording emerged of Sizemore alleging that former girlfriend Elizabeth Hurley had an affair with Bill Clinton in 1998. Under threat of legal action, Sizemore admitted that the allegation was false. He elaborated that the recording was made without his knowledge during a time when he was battling substance abuse.

In February 2017, he pleaded no contest to two charges of domestic abuse for assaulting his girlfriend. He was sentenced to 36 months of summary probation, 30 days of community service and a year-long domestic violence program. He was subject to two protective orders associated with the charges and ordered to pay various fees. The deal was made by Sizemore to avoid spending 210 days in jail.

In November 2017, it was revealed by The Hollywood Reporter that Sizemore had been kicked off the set of the film Born Killers (then known as Piggy Banks) in 2003 for allegedly sexually molesting an 11-year-old actress when the film was in production near Salt Lake City, Utah. He denied any wrongdoing and was allowed back on the film set after the Salt Lake County prosecutor's office decided against going forward with the case "due to witness and evidence problems." In May 2018, the actress, by then 26 years old, filed a lawsuit against Sizemore, claiming that his alleged abuse caused longstanding emotional problems and seeking at least $3 million. A statement from Sizemore's publicist again denied the abuse, noting that nothing amiss was reported by a Born Killers staff member whose duty was supervising the child actors who were on the set. On August 27, 2020, USA Today reported that a Utah judge had dismissed the lawsuit. Sizemore again denied her claims saying: "Beyond the loss of work and the pain and humiliation this has caused me and my family, the thought that an 11-year-old girl would think I violated her, whether it be because she misconstrued some inadvertent touching when the director placed her upon my lap for the photo shoot or someone else instilled this idea in her head for whatever malicious, self-serving reasons, is what devastates me most."

On January 5, 2019, Sizemore was arrested for misdemeanor drug possession of "various illegal narcotics" in Burbank, California.

== Death ==
On February 18, 2023, Sizemore suffered a brain aneurysm at his Los Angeles home and was hospitalized at Providence Saint Joseph Medical Center in critical condition. On February 27, his representative issued a statement indicating that doctors had determined that there was "no further hope" for Sizemore to recover and had "recommended end-of-life decisions" to his family. Sizemore died on March 3, 2023, at the age of 61.

== Filmography ==
=== Film ===
Year	Title	Role	Notes	Ref.
1989	Lock Up	Dallas		
1989	Rude Awakening	Ian		
1989	Penn & Teller Get Killed	2nd Mugger		
1989	Born on the Fourth of July	Vet No. 1		
1990	A Matter of Degrees	Zeno Stefanos		
1990	Blue Steel	Wool Cap		
1991	Flight of the Intruder	"Boxman"		
1991	Guilty by Suspicion	Ray Karlin		
1991	Point Break	DEA Agent Deets	Uncredited	
1991	Harley Davidson and the Marlboro Man	Chance Wilder		
1991	Where Sleeping Dogs Lie	Eddie Hale		
1992	Love Is Like That	Lenny		
1992	Passenger 57	Sly Delvecchio		
1993	Watch It	Danny		
1993	Heart and Souls	Milo Peck		
1993	True Romance	Detective Cody Nicholson		
1993	Striking Distance	Danny Detillo		
1994	Wyatt Earp	Bat Masterson		
1994	Natural Born Killers	Detective Jack Scagnetti		
1995	Strange Days	Max Peltier		
1995	Devil in a Blue Dress	DeWitt Albright		
1995	Heat	Michael Cheritto		
1997	The Relic	Lieutenant Vincent D'Agosta		
1998	Saving Private Ryan	Sergeant First Class Mike Horvath		
1998	Witness to the Mob	John Gotti		
1998	Enemy of the State	Paulie Pintero, Mob Kingpin	(Uncredited)	
1999	The Florentine	Teddy		
1999	The Match	"Buffalo"		
1999	Bringing Out the Dead	Tom Wolls		
1999	Play It to the Bone	Joe Domino		
2000	Get Carter	Les Fletcher (voice)		
2000	Red Planet	Dr. Quinn Burchenal		
2001	Pearl Harbor	Sergeant Earl Sistern		
2001	Ticker	Detective Ray Nettles		
2001	Black Hawk Down	Colonel Danny McKnight		
2002	Big Trouble	"Snake" Dupree		
2002	Swindle	Seth George		
2002	Welcome to America	Zach		
2003	Pauly Shore Is Dead	Himself		
2003	Dreamcatcher	Lieutenant Owen Underhill		
2004	Paparazzi	Rex Harper		
2005	The Nickel Children	Freedo		
2005	Born Killers	Dad		
2005	No Rules	Kain Diamond		
2006	Zyzzyx Road	Joey		
2006	Ring Around the Rosie	Pierce	Video	
2006	Shut Up and Shoot!	Himself		
2006	Splinter	Detective Cunningham		
2006	The Genius Club	Armand		
2007	White Air	Steve		
2007	Bottom Feeder	Vince Stoker		
2007	Game of Life	Burt		
2007	Protecting the King	Ronnie		
2007	Furnace	Frank Miller		
2007	A Broken Life	Max		
2008	American Son	Dale		
2008	The Flyboys	Angelo Esposito		
2008	Red	Michael McCormack		
2008	The Acquirer	Arthur		
2008	The Last Lullaby	Price		
2008	Stiletto	"Large" Bills		
2008	Toxic	Van Sant		
2009	Commute	God		
2009	Super Capers	Roger Cheatem		
2009	The Grind	Chuck		
2009	Angels and Fire	Mack Fogg	Short	
2009	21 and a Wake-Up	Jack Breedlau		
2009	Double Duty	Craig		
2010	Big Money Rustlas	Himself		
2010	Shadows in Paradise	Colonel Bunker		
2010	The Auctioneers	Abel		
2010	Corrado	Paolo Spinello		
2011	Good God Bad Dog	Ezra Mann	Short	
2011	Black Gold	Detective Brandano		
2011	Cellmates	Leroy Lowe		
2011	Cross	Detective Nitti	Video	
2011	Contractor's Routine	Art Professor		
2011	Suing the Devil	Tony "The Hip" Anzaldo		
2011	The Speak	Doyle		
2011	El Cartel de los Sapos	DEA Agent Sam Mathews		
2011	The Saints of Mt. Christopher	Richard Satler		
2012	Slumber Party Slaughter	Tom Kingsford		
2012	El bosc	Pickett		
2012	Visible Scars	Mike Gillis		
2012	Pieces	Jim	Short	
2013	Madoff: Made Off with America	Vito		
2013	Company of Heroes	Lieutenant Dean Ransom	Video	
2013	Five Hour Friends	Timothy Bonner		
2013	Meth Head	Sonny		
2013	Chlorine	Ernie		
2013	Paranormal Movie	Himself		
2013	Before I Sleep	Randy		
2013	Crosshairs	Jimmy Marcos		
2013	Remnants	General Vincent Tate		
2013	The Charlatan	Cop	Short	
2013	Five Thirteen	Glen		
2013	Fake Dog Shit	The Bum	Short	
2014	Auteur	Himself		
2014	SEAL Team 8: Behind Enemy Lines	Ricks	Video	
2014	The Drunk	Bruce Frye		
2014	Flashes	Detective Mark Hume		
2014	Through the Eye	Frank Rossi		
2014	Murder 101	FBI Agent Ridley		
2014	Private Number	Jeff		
2014	Bordering on Bad Behavior	Bob		
2014	Where I Come From	Tom	Short	
2014	Reach Me	Frank		
2014	The Age of Reason	Robert		
2015	24 Hours	Damian White		
2015	The Intruders	Howard Markby		
2015	Laugh Killer Laugh	Orphanage Headmaster		
2015	Terms & Conditions	"El Viejo"		
2015	6 Ways to Die	Mike Jones		
2015	Night of the Living Dead: Darkest Dawn	Chief McClelland	Voice	
2015	If I Tell You I Have to Kill You	Dr. Richard Baum		
2015	Collar	Chief Hamilton Markham		
2016	Clandestine	Assemblyman Dean Bada		
2016	Durant's Never Closes	Jack Durant		
2016	Swap	Kyle Norris		
2016	Halloweed	Vincent Modine		
2016	Crossing Point	Pedro		
2016	Wolf Mother	Jon		
2016	Hunting Season	Nick		
2016	Traded	Lew Crawford / Lavoie		
2016	The Bronx Bull	Tony		
2016	Beyond Valkyrie: Dawn of the 4th Reich	Master Sergeant O'Malley		
2016	USS Indianapolis: Men of Courage	Chief Petty Officer McWhorter		
2016	Better Criminal	Sergeant Mike Martin		
2016	Calico Skies	Phoenix		
2017	Secrets of Deception	Eddie Green		
2017	Cross Wars	Detective Frank Nitti		
2017	Joe's War	Captain Vickers		
2017	Atomica	Darius Zek		
2017	Misirlou	Colonel Rich "Big Rich"		
2017	The Immortal Wars	"Bloodshed"		
2017	The Assault	Detective Gary Broza		
2017	Bad Frank	Mickey Duro		
2017	College Ball			
2017	Mark Felt: The Man Who Brought Down the White House	FBI Agent Bill Sullivan		
2017	The Slider	Nurse		
2017	A Chance in the World	John Sykes		
2017	I Believe	Don Carlo		
2017	Blood Circus	Detective Jake Dawson		
2017	Radical	CIA Agent McKitrick		
2017	Beautiful Flowers	High Priest	Short	
2018	The Second Coming of Christ	Larry		
2018	The Litch	Giovanni Moretti		
2018	Unkillable	Mr. Gilliam		
2018	The Martyr Maker	CIA Agent Terry Davis		
2018	Black Wake	Detective Michaels		
2018	Speed Kills	Dwayne Franklin		
2018	Dead Ringer	Boyd Dennison		
2018	Prepper's Grove			
2018	Nazi Overlord	Colonel Forrester		
2018	Exit 14	Roy		
2018	The Debt	Richie	Short	
2018	Ole Bryce	Dr. Bryce		
2019	Wish Man	Sergeant Mason		
2019	Myra	"Coco" Lewandowski		
2019	Hell to Pay	Sabbath	Short	
2019	Hell Girl	Jebidiha		
2019	The Pining	Father William		
2019	Killing Me		Short	
2019	7 Deadly Sins	Richard Gates		
2019	I Am Not for Sale: The Fight to End Human Trafficking	Doctor		
2019	John Wynn's Mirror Mirror	Callahan Wilson		
2019	Abstruse	Max London		
2019	Cross 3	Detective Frank Nitti		
2020	Adam	"Lucky"		
2020	The Runners	Pastor Dave Twiss		
2020	Monster Hunters	Colonel Mayweather		
2020	Nowheresville	Preacher		
2020	Apocalypse of Ice	Reggie		
2020	C.L.E.A.N.	Mr. Wilkens, The Manager		
2020	Hell Hole	Roscoe		
2021	When Devils Play	Don Gennaro	Short	
2021	Narco Sub	DEA Agent-In-Charge Craig Ford		
2021	Central Park Dark	Thomas Winters		
2021	Alien Conquest	General Reed		
2021	Monstrous: Interview with a Killer	Gabriel Light		
2021	The Trouble	Bob Carter		
2021	Megalodon Rising	Commander Moore		
2021	Hustle Down	Cully		
2022	Vampfather	Dr. Oomious		
2022	Damon's Revenge	Sheriff Walsh		
2022	The Electric Man	Jace		
2022	Impuratus	Detective Clayton Douglas		
2022	Project Skyquake	Hank		
2022	Bullet Train Down	Scott Madison		
2022	Night of the Tommyknockers	Marshal Steed		
2022	Battle for Pandora	Commander Hank Lewis		
2022	Amber Road	Pluto		
2022	Dine n' Dashians 3	Shh "Hitman"	Short	
2022	An Hedonia, The Fallen	Bossman Roy	Short	
2022	The Legend of Jack and Diane	Detective Parker		
2023	The Getter	Moe "Cadillac"	Posthumous release	
2023	Breakout	Chaz Coleman	Posthumous release	
2023	Made Vicious	Victor	Posthumous release	
2023	Mega Ape	Tom Goodwin	Posthumous release	
2023	Buckle Up	Lucas Bergman	Unreleased	

=== Television ===
Year	Title	Role	Notes	Ref.
1989	Gideon Oliver	Paul Slocum	Episode: "Sleep Well, Professor Oliver"	
1989–90	China Beach	Sergeant Vinnie Ventresca	Recurring cast: Season 3	
1990	Against the Law	Rainey Fults	Episode: "Contempt"	
1992	An American Story	Jesse Meadows	Television film	
1998	Witness to the Mob	John Gotti	Television film	
1999	Witness Protection	Bobby "Bats" Batton	Television film	
2001	The Directors	Himself	Episode: "The Films of Michael Mann"	
2002	Reel Comedy	Himself	Episode: "Big Trouble"	
2002	Justice League	Rex Mason / Metamorpho (voice)	Episode: "Metamorphosis"	
2002	Sins of the Father	Tom Cherry	Television film	
2002–03	Robbery Homicide Division	Lieutenant Sam Cole	Main cast	
2004	Hustle	Pete Rose	Television film	
2004	Dr. Vegas	Vic Moore	Main cast	
2007	Shooting Sizemore	Himself	Main cast	
2007	Head Case	Himself	2 episodes	
2007	Superstorm	Katzenberg	Main cast	
2008	CSI: Miami	Kurt Rossi	Episode: "Down to the Wire"	
2008–09	Crash	Detective Adrian Cooper	Main cast: Season 1	
2009	Southland	Timmy Davis	Episode: "See the Woman"	
2010	Celebrity Rehab with Dr. Drew	Himself	Main cast: Season 3	
2010	Celebrity Rehab Presents Sober House	Himself	Main cast: Season 2	
2010	Entourage	Himself	Episode: "Tequila Sunrise"	
2010	It's Always Sunny in Philadelphia	Byron the Trucker	Episode: "The Gang Gets Stranded in the Woods"	
2010	P Lo's House	Himself	Television film	
2011–12	Hawaii Five-0	Captain Vince Fryer	Recurring cast: Season 2	
2012	Perception	Bobby Lonergan	Episode: "Nemesis"	
2012	Law & Order: Special Victims Unit	Lewis Hoda	Episode: "Manhattan Vigil"	
2013	Dr. Phil	Himself	Episode: "Explosive Relationships"	
2014	Dark Haul	Knicks	Television film	
2014–15	The Red Road	Jack Kopus	Recurring cast	
2015	Law & Order: Special Victims Unit	Lewis Hoda	Episode: "Depravity Standard"	
2015	Exit Strategy	Jonathan Marks	Unaired pilot	
2016	Lucifer	Hank Cutter	Episode: "Favorite Son"	
2016	Undercover	Captain Rogers	Episode: "Is It Really What It Appears to Be?"	
2016–2017	Shooter	Hugh Meachum	Recurring cast: "Season 1"	
2017	Twin Peaks	Anthony Sinclair	Recurring cast	
2021	Scarlett	Joe Salvatore	Television film	
2023	Barbee Rehab	Dr. Tom	Main cast	

=== Video games ===
Year	Title	Role	Notes	Ref.
2002	Grand Theft Auto: Vice City	Sonny Forelli		
2006	24: The Game	Sid Wilson		
2021	Grand Theft Auto: The Trilogy – The Definitive Edition	Sonny Forelli	Archival recordings Remaster of Grand Theft Auto: Vice City only.	

== Awards and nominations ==
Year	Award	Category	Nominated work	Result
1994	Academy of Science Fiction, Fantasy & Horror Films	Best Supporting Actor	Heart and Souls	Nominated
1998	Golden Satellite Award	Best Actor in a Supporting Role in a Motion Picture	Saving Private Ryan	Nominated
1999	Screen Actors Guild Awards	Outstanding Performance by a Cast	Saving Private Ryan	Nominated
2000	Golden Globe Awards	Golden Globe Award for Best Performance by an Actor in a Miniseries or Motion Picture Made for Television	Witness Protection	Nominated
2006	XRCO Award	Best New Stud	Triple-X Tom	Nominated
2021	IndieFEST Film Awards	Best Supporting Actor	The Electric Man	Won
2022	Accolade Competition	Best Supporting Actor	The Electric Man	Won
2022	Vegas Movie Awards	Best Supporting Actor	Project Skyquake	Won
2022	Hollywood Blood Horror Festival	Best Supporting Actor	Amber Road	Won

== Book ==
- Sizemore, Tom (with Anna David) (April 9, 2013). By Some Miracle I Made It Out of There: A Memoir. Atria Books. ISBN 978-1-451-68167-3.
