= Wrong Turn (film series) =

American horror film series

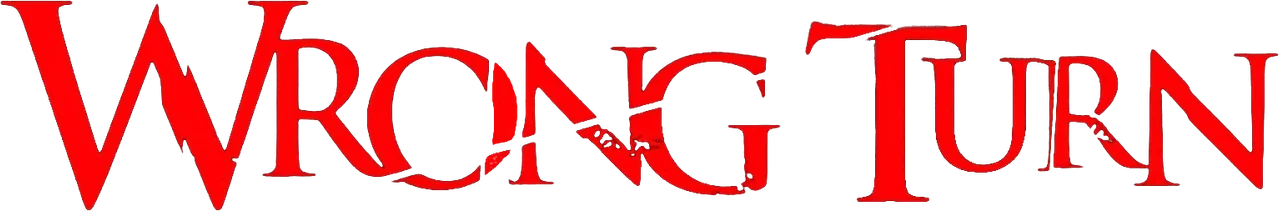
- Official logo
- Created by: Alan B. McElroy
- Original work: Wrong Turn (2003)
- Owners: 20th Century Studios (1–6); Saban Films (7)
- Years: 2003–2021

Films and television
- Films: Wrong Turn (2003); Wrong Turn (2021)
- Direct-to-video: Wrong Turn 2: Dead End (2007); Wrong Turn 3: Left for Dead (2009); Wrong Turn 4: Bloody Beginnings (2011); Wrong Turn 5: Bloodlines (2012); Wrong Turn 6: Last Resort (2014)

Audio
- Soundtracks: List of soundtracks

Wrong Turn is an American horror film series created by Alan B. McElroy. The series consists of seven films, five of which share the same continuity, while the later two films serve as reboots.

The films originally focus on various families of deformed cannibals who hunt and kill a group of people in West Virginia in horrific ways by using a mixture of traps and weaponry. The 2021 reboot film features a centuries-old cult in Virginia who respond violently to outsiders who intrude on their self-sufficient civilization. The film series became known primarily as a direct-to-video franchise grossing $25 million in home video sales.

== Films ==
Film	U.S. release date	Director(s)	Screenwriter(s)	Producer(s)
Wrong Turn	May 30, 2003	Rob Schmidt	Alan B. McElroy	Stan Winston, Brian Gilbert, Erik Feig & Robert Kulzer
Wrong Turn 2: Dead End	October 9, 2007	Joe Lynch	Turi Meyer & Al Septien	Jeff Freilich
Wrong Turn 3: Left for Dead	October 20, 2009	Declan O'Brien	Connor James Delaney	Jeffery Beach & Phillip J. Roth
Wrong Turn 4: Bloody Beginnings	October 25, 2011	Declan O'Brien	Declan O'Brien	Kim Todd
Wrong Turn 5: Bloodlines	October 23, 2012	Declan O'Brien	Declan O'Brien	Jeffery Beach & Phillip J. Roth
Wrong Turn 6: Last Resort	October 21, 2014	Valeri Milev	Frank H. Woodward	Jeffery Beach & Phillip J. Roth
Wrong Turn	January 26, 2021	Mike P. Nelson	Alan B. McElroy	James Harris & Robert Kulzer

=== Wrong Turn (2003) ===
In the first film, a group of six individuals are stalked by One Eye, Saw Tooth, and Three Finger. Chris Flynn (Desmond Harrington) is forced to make a detour after a chemical spill on the road. He makes a wrong turn and crashes into another vehicle which had already fallen victim to one of the mountain men's road traps. While searching for help in the cabin belonging to the three monstrous mountain men, they are hunted down one by one. At the end, Chris and Jessie Burlingame (Eliza Dushku) survive.

=== Wrong Turn 2: Dead End (2007) ===
The second film introduces new cannibals: Ma, Pa, Brother and Sister. Three Finger and the Old Man are the only returning characters from the first film. This time, the cannibals hunt down a group of reality show contestants who are taking part in a survival reality TV show, leaving Nina Papas (Erica Leerhsen) and Jake Washington (Texas Battle) as the only two survivors.

=== Wrong Turn 3: Left for Dead (2009) ===
Wrong Turn 3: Left for Dead features a group of prison officers and convicts. The returning character Three Finger causes the transport bus to crash, allowing the convicts to escape and take the surviving prison officers, Nate (Tom Frederic) and Walter (Chucky Venn) prisoner. While fleeing, the convicts and their prisoners stumble across a lost truck which had been transporting thousands of dollars, as well as Alex Miles (Janet Montgomery), who has been lost in the woods since Three Finger killed the rest of her friends. Eventually, Three Toes (Three Finger's nephew) is killed by Chavez. Three Finger finds Three Toes's severed head, which makes him furious. He creates a shrine and leaves the head on display in his cabin. The one remaining surviving convict, Brandon, convinces Nate of his innocence, and is set free. Nate returns later to the truck to steal the money that Chavez wanted. But Brandon shoots him in the back with a bow and arrow and takes the money for himself. An unknown cannibal comes up behind Brandon and bludgeons him with a crude club killing him and leaving Alex the only survivor in the film.

=== Wrong Turn 4: Bloody Beginnings (2011) ===
This film provides the back story to the three original killers and shows their childhood. It also shows the three brothers story. The story focuses on a group of nine teenagers who take a wrong turn while riding their snowmobiles and are looking for their cabin. They end up in an old abandoned insane asylum which is still inhabited by Three Finger, Saw Tooth and One Eye. The friends decide to spend the night in the insane asylum and they are attacked by the hilker brothers. By the end of the film, all nine teenagers are dead. The film served as a prequel to the first film.

=== Wrong Turn 5: Bloodlines (2012) ===
It is revealed that Maynard is a serial killer who has been on the run for over thirty years, and is now in cahoots with the three cannibal brothers. He repeatedly refers to them as 'my boys' and his kin. Throughout the course of the film, the brothers attempt to break Maynard out of jail and kill off the college students and Sheriff Angela Carter (Camilla Arfwedson), while the rest of the town is at the festival. The film ends with Maynard and the three brothers escaping with the blinded young college student Lita (Roxanne McKee) as a captive.

=== Wrong Turn 6: Last Resort (2014) ===
In the sixth installment, Danny (Anthony Ilott) discovers his long lost family as he takes his friends to Hobb Springs, a Forgotten resort deep into the West Virginia Hills. Danny then has to choose between his family or his friends as they are being killed by his family one by one. The film doesn't follow the continuity of its predecessors and serves as a reboot instead.

=== Wrong Turn (2021) ===
Internationally known as Wrong Turn: The Foundation, the second reboot film follows six friends hiking on the Appalachian Trail who become hunted by the Foundation when they inadvertently intrude on the community's land.

== Cast and crew ==
=== Principal cast ===
Key
- A ^{Y} indicates the actor portrayed the role of a younger version of the character.
- An ^{O} indicates a role as an older version of the character.
- A ^{V} indicates the actor or actress lent only his or her voice for his or her film character.
- A ^{C} indicates a cameo appearance.
- An ^{A} indicates an appearance through archival footage.
- A dark gray cell indicates the character was not in the film.

Characters	Films						
Characters	Wrong Turn	Wrong Turn 2: Dead End	Wrong Turn 3: Left for Dead	Wrong Turn 4: Bloody Beginnings	Wrong Turn 5: Bloodlines	Wrong Turn 6: Last Resort	Wrong Turn
Characters	2003	2007	2009	2011	2012	2014	2021
the Cannibals
Andrei "Three Finger" Odets	Julian Richings	Jeff Scrutton	Borislav Iliev	Sean Skene Blane Cypurda^{Y}	Borislav Iliev	Radoslav Parvanov	
Andu "Saw Tooth" Odets	Garry Robbins			Scott Johnson Bryan Verot^{Y}	George Karlukovski	Danko Jordanov	
Tudor "One Eye" Odets	Ted Clark			Dan Skene Tristan Carlucci^{Y}	Radoslav Parvanov	Asen Asenov	
Pa		Ken Kirzinger					
Ma		Ashlea Earl					
Brother		Clint Carleton					
Sister		Rorelee Tio					
Three Toes		Appeared	Borislav Petrov				
Humans
Maynard Odets	Wayne Robson^{O}	Wayne Robson^{O}			Doug Bradley^{Y}		
Chris Flynn	Desmond Harrington						
Jessica "Jessie" Burlingame	Eliza Dushku						
Carly Numan	Emmanuelle Chriqui						
Scott Korbee	Jeremy Sisto						
Evan Ross	Kevin Zegers						
Francine Childes	Lindy Booth						
Nina Papas		Erica Leerhsen					
Colonel Dale Murphy		Henry Rollins					
Jake Washington		Texas Battle					
Mara Stone		Aleksa Palladino					
Amber Williams		Daniella Alonso					
Matt "Jonesy" Jones		Steve Braun					
Elena Garcia		Crystal Lowe					
Officer Nate Wilson			Tom Frederic				
Alexandra "Alex" Miles			Janet Montgomery				
Carlos Chavez			Tamer Hassan				
Floyd			Gil Kolirin				
Brandon Lewis			Tom McKay				
Williams "Willy" Juarez			Christian Contreras				
Crawford			Jake Curran				
Walter Hazelton			Chucky Venn				
Kenia Perrin				Jennifer Pudavick			
Kyle Turner				Victor Zinck Jr.			
Sara Washington				Tenika Davis			
Jenna Rivers				Terra Vnesa			
Daniel Mullins				Dean Armstrong			
Lauren Perry				Ali Tataryn			
Bridget Manalo				Kaitlyn Leeb			
Claire Kendrick				Samantha Kendrick			
Vincent				Sean Skene			
Dr. Brendan Ryan				Arne MacPherson			
Dr. Ann Marie McQuaid				Kristen Harris			
Mrs. Hillicker				Mentioned			
Sheriff Angela "Angie" Carter					Camilla Arfwedson		
Billy Biggs					Simon Ginty		
Lita Marquez					Roxanne McKee		
Gus					Paul Luebke		
Julian					Oliver Hoare		
Cruz					Amy Lennox		
Mose					Duncan Wisbey		
Danny						Anthony Ilott	
Jackson						Chris Jarvis	
Toni						Aqueela Zoll	
Sally						Sadie Katz	
Vic						Rollo Skinner	
Jillian						Roxanne Pallett	
Rod						Billy Ashworth	
Charlie						Harry Belcher	
Bryan						Joe Gaminara	
Jennifer "Jen" Shaw							Charlotte Vega
Scott Shaw							Matthew Modine
Darius Clemons							Aiden Bradley
Milla D'Angelo							Emma Dumont
Adam Lucas							Dylan McTee
Gary Amaan							Vardaan Arora
Luis Ortiz							Adrian Favela
Edith							Daisy Head
Venable Ram Skull							Bill Sage

== Characters ==
The Wrong Turn film series has featured several different cannibals. All of the cannibals are hostile toward the characters they encounter, showing no remorse for their victims. The cannibals are portrayed as mute, but show the ability to communicate with each other. They also show the mental capability to operate machinery and vehicles. The cannibals stay with each other in groups and appear to be the result of inbreeding.

=== Three Finger ===
Three Finger is the main antagonist of the Wrong Turn film series. He is a cannibal with great physical deformity caused by toxic chemicals he was exposed to at birth, alongside his two brothers. He is a skilled trap maker, crafting his traps so well that they often kill his victims before he can enact horrific acts of violence upon them.

- In Wrong Turn (2003), he made his first appearance alongside his two brothers, attacking the medical student, Chris Flynn and the group of friends including Jessie Burlingame, Carly Marquez, Scott, Evan, and Francine, However, in the end of the film, Three Finger manages to survive as he was last seen killing the deputy sheriff as he investigates the destroyed cabin. However, his brothers were presumably dead.
- In Wrong Turn 2: Dead End, he is seen killing Kimberly by cutting her in half with the help of Brother, a member of the cannibal family. Then, he and the mutant family begin their brutal assault on the rest of the contestants as he successfully killed Neil, a television crew member and captured Colonel Dale Murphy with the help of Pa. Later, he was seen torturing Dale in his cabin but Dale somehow manages to escape before engaging Three Finger in a knife fight. During the fight, Dale manages to shoot Three Finger in the chest with a shotgun and as the result, he was presumed dead, but he survives.
- In Wrong Turn 3: Left For Dead, he is trying to kill a group of hikers and prisoners, and he is killed at the end of the film, stabbed in the head with his hook and blown up on top of a car.
- Wrong Turn 4: Bloody Beginnings, the fourth installment in the franchise, is an origin story of the mutant cannibals showing how they came to be.
- In Wrong Turn 5: Bloodlines he is the antagonist alongside his two original brothers. During the series, he has been blown up, stabbed, impaled, and shot various times, and yet survives; he is also very skillful at creating traps that will instantly kill the victims before he finishes his cruel job on them. In addition, he also has the unnatural ability of regenerating.
- In Wrong Turn 6: Last Resort, he returns alongside his two original brothers.

=== Saw Tooth ===
Saw Tooth, like his two brothers, first appears in Wrong Turn (2003). He is the biggest and strongest of the family and appears to be the leader of his branch of his family as he is the older brother to Three Finger and One Eye. He is killed at the end of the first film and does not appear again until the first prequel, Wrong Turn 4: Bloody Beginnings, Wrong Turn 5: Bloodlines and then Wrong Turn 6: Last Resort.

=== One Eye ===
One Eye, the least harmful of the three, first appears in Wrong Turn (2003). Just like Saw Tooth, he dies in the first film, and does not make another appearance until the fourth, fifth and sixth film.

=== Maynard Odets ===
The Patriarch of the cannibals who appeared in the first two films and the fifth film.

=== Other cannibals ===
Wrong Turn 2: Dead End introduces a family of four cannibals called Ma, Pa, Brother and Sister. The two young siblings are shown to have an incestuous relationship; Sister even gets extremely jealous and angry when she catches Brother masturbating while spying on a human girl. Ma gives birth to a mutant baby before she (and the rest of her family) is killed. The second film ends with Three Finger caring for the baby. The baby becomes known as Three Toes in Wrong Turn 3: Left for Dead. Three Toes is killed by a group of convicts, and his head left as a warning. Three Finger finds Three Toes' severed head, which makes him furious. He creates a shrine and leaves the head on display in his cabin. In the third film's ending, another cannibal shows up, killing Brandon. The sixth film introduces Sally, Danny, and Jackson.

=== The Foundation ===
The Wrong Turn (2021) reboot introduces the Foundation, a self-sufficient civilization who have lived on the Appalachian Trail since the 19th century. They are hostile to any outsiders intruding on their secluded community.

==== Venable / Ram Skull ====
The leader of the Foundation.

==== Cullen / Wild Boar Skull ====
A member of the Foundation.

==== Morgan / Deer Skull ====
A member of the Foundation.

Skull member

==== Edith ====
A member of the Foundation.

==== Ruthie ====
A mute young girl and a member of the Foundation.

== Reception ==
=== Box office performance ===
Film	Year	Box office gross			Budget	Reference
Film	Year	North America	Other territories	Worldwide	Budget	Reference
Wrong Turn	2003	$15.418.790	$13.231.785	$28.260.575	$12.600.000	
Wrong Turn	2021	$1.251.184	$3.578.742	$4.829.926	$13.000.000	
Total		$16.669.974	$16.810.527	$33.090.501	$26.600.000	

=== Critical and public response ===
Film	Rotten Tomatoes	Metacritic	CinemaScore
Wrong Turn (2003)	40% (82 reviews)	32 (17 reviews)	C−
Wrong Turn 2: Dead End	70% (10 reviews)	—N/a	—N/a
Wrong Turn 3: Left for Dead	0% (5 reviews)	—N/a	—N/a
Wrong Turn 4: Bloody Beginnings	57% (7 reviews)	—N/a	—N/a
Wrong Turn 5: Bloodlines	N/A (3 reviews)	—N/a	—N/a
Wrong Turn 6: Last Resort	N/A (1 review)	—N/a	—N/a
Wrong Turn (2021)	65% (65 reviews)	46 (7 reviews)	—N/a

== Music ==
Soundtracks to Wrong Turn films
Title	U.S. release date	Length	Performed by	Label
Wrong Turn: Original Motion Picture Soundtrack	June 3, 2003	45:43	Elia Cmiral	Varèse Sarabande
Wrong Turn: Soundtrack from the Motion Picture	July 1, 2003	47:01	Various artists	Lakeshore Records
Wrong Turn 2: Dead End (Original Motion Picture Soundtrack)	September 18, 2007	52:11	Bear McCreary	La-La Land Records
Wrong Turn: The Foundation (Original Soundtrack)	February 25, 2021	65:01	Stephen Lukach	Konigskinder Music
