= Chris Jarvis =

Chris Jarvis may refer to:

- Chris Jarvis (presenter) (born 1969), British presenter of children's television programmes
- Chris Jarvis (actor) (born 1980), British actor best known for his role in The Bill
- Chris Jarvis (rower) (born 1980), Canadian Olympic rower
