= Wrong Turn 3: Left for Dead =

2009 film by Declan O'Brien

- Official DVD cover
- Directed by: Declan O'Brien
- Written by: Connor James Delaney
- Based on: Characters by Alan B. McElroy
- Produced by: Jeffrey Beach; Phillip Roth
- Starring: Tom Frederic; Janet Montgomery; Tamer Hassan
- Cinematography: Lorenzo Senatore
- Edited by: Raúl Dávalos
- Music by: Claude Foisy
- Production companies: Constantin Film; Summit Entertainment
- Distributed by: 20th Century Fox Home Entertainment
- Release date: October 20, 2009
- Running time: 92 minutes
- Countries: Germany; United States
- Language: English
- Budget: $2 million

Wrong Turn 3: Left for Dead is a 2009 slasher film directed by Declan O'Brien, written by Connor James Delaney, and starring Tom Frederic, Janet Montgomery, and Tamer Hassan. An international co-production between Summit Entertainment from the United States and Constantin Film from Germany, it is a sequel to Wrong Turn 2: Dead End (2007) and the third installment in the Wrong Turn film series, it follows a group of convicts' transfer bus crashes in the West Virginia woods, as they and a corrections officer encounter a young woman fleeing cannibalistic hillbillies who murdered her friends.

Wrong Turn 3: Left for Dead was released on October 20, 2009, by 20th Century Fox Home Entertainment. The film was panned by critics, and had grossed $5.9 million in home sales. It was followed by a prequel, Wrong Turn 4: Bloody Beginnings (2011).

== Plot ==
Several years after the reality TV show massacre, 4 college students – Alex, Brent, Sophie, and Trey – go to the West Virginia backcountry on a rafting trip. As they are camping by the riverside, the inbred cannibal Three Finger appears and murders the teens except for Alex, who escapes after witnessing her friends' deaths.

Two days later, three prison guards, Nate Wilson, Walter and Preslow, are assigned, along with undercover prisoner and U.S. Marshal William "Willy" Juarez, to oversee the transportation of Carlo Chavez, a leader of a crime organization, to a distant prison in Hazelton with 3 other prisoners: Floyd, a neo-Nazi serial killer; Crawford, a car thief, and Brandon, a former U.S. Marine.

En route, they take the road to the abandoned paper mill through Greenbrier County when their bus tires are tangled with barbed wire from Three Finger's truck and crash into the woods, forcing them to continue on foot as Three Finger attacks them from the distance and kills Preslow. Nate and Walter are now held hostage by the prisoners when they find Alex hiding out in the woods from Three Finger and his nephew Three Toes.

As they follow her, they find an abandoned armored truck containing bags of money. Nate finds a gun in the truck and gives it to Walter, who uses it to shoot Chavez, but the weapon is not loaded, and the latter kills Walter in retaliation. Chavez forces those left alive to carry the money and walk to the campsite so the criminals can use the rafts for their escape with the loot. Along the trail, they stumble upon a trap set by Three Toes that they can evade. Chavez and Floyd subdue the young cannibal and behead him, leaving a trophy on the spent booby trap for Three Finger to find as a deterrent. After Nate disrupts the prisoners' escape to the river, Chavez unwittingly releases a trap set by Three Finger that kills Willy. The prisoners find Three Finger's truck, and when Crawford attempts to hijack the vehicle, he is lured into another trap by Three Finger, who ensnares him with a netting of razor wire and drives off, dragging him down the road.

Local town Sheriff Calvin Carver discovers the crashed prison bus and contacts the U.S. Marshal team while looking for Nate's group and his deputy Ally Lane. Nate and Alex, with Brandon's help by distracting Floyd from attacking Chavez, attempt to escape, but the latter recaptures the two after beating down Floyd and leaving him behind. After they find the location where the watch tower once stood, which was burned down years ago, Carver finds the group, but he is killed by Three Finger. When Chavez attempts to reclaim the money, Floyd takes the bags as Chavez chases after him, only to see Three Finger lobbing a molotov cocktail at Floyd, killing him and burning all the money. Now enraged at the mutant cannibal, Chavez tosses Alex to Three Finger to improve his chances of survival, and she is taken captive. Infuriating the others by his actions, Chavez is knocked unconscious by Brandon, who allows Nate to go back and rescue Alex. Chavez is then killed by Three Finger after the mutant overpowers him during their fight.

Alex awakens in Three Finger's cabin and sees Deputy Lane dying from a razor wire net. Nate finds the cabin and frees Alex, but they are attacked by Three Finger as they escape. Three Finger chases after them as they drive away in his tow truck, causing them to crash into a tree. Brandon appears as the truck is about to explode and pulls Alex out. While Brandon helps Nate, Three Finger attacks them, but Nate manages to kill him by stabbing him in the head with his meat hook. After Nate releases Brandon in return for his help, the Marshal team arrives the next morning to rescue Nate and Alex.

Sometime later, Nate returns to the forest to take the remaining money from the armored truck, but Brandon appears and kills him. As he takes the money, an unknown cannibal appears and kills Brandon.

== Cast ==
- Tom Frederic as Officer Nate Wilson
- Janet Montgomery as Alex Miles
- Tom McKay as Brandon Lewis
- Tamer Hassan as Carlos Chavez
- Gil Kolirin as Floyd
- Jake Curran as Crawford
- Christian Contreras as U.S. Marshal William Juarez
- Borislav Iliev as Three Finger
- Borislav Petrov as Three Toes
- Emma Clifford as Deputy Ally Lane
- Bill Moody as Sheriff Calvin Carver
- Chucky Venn as Walter Hazelton
- Louise Cliffe as Sophie Delaney
- Jack Gordon as Trey King
- Charley Speed as Brent McDonald
- Mike Straub as Preslow
- Mac McDonald as Warden Ladew
- Vlado Mihailov as Deputy U.S. Marshal Davis
- Todd Jensen as U.S. Marshal

== Production ==
Shooting took place in Sofia, Bulgaria. The only returning character was Three Finger; however he was played by a different actor, the third in as many films.

== Home media ==
The film was released on DVD and Blu-ray on October 20, 2009. The film grossed $5.9 million in home sales.

== Reception ==
On review aggregation website Rotten Tomatoes the film has a 0% score based on reviews from five critics. Bloody Disgusting said, "If WT2 raised the bar, then WT3 lowers it right back down to where it was, and possibly a notch or two lower."

== Prequel ==
A prequel titled Wrong Turn 4: Bloody Beginnings, was released in 2011.
