= Wrong Turn 6: Last Resort =

2014 film by Valeri Milev

- Official DVD cover
- Directed by: Valeri Milev
- Written by: Frank H. Woodward
- Based on: Characters by Alan B. McElroy
- Produced by: Jeffery Beach; Phillip Roth
- Starring: Anthony Ilott; Chris Jarvis; Aqueela Zoll; Sadie Katz
- Cinematography: Martin Chichov
- Edited by: Don Adams; Cameron Hallenbeck
- Music by: Claude Foisy
- Production companies: Constantin Film; Regency Enterprises; Summit Entertainment
- Distributed by: 20th Century Fox Home Entertainment
- Release date: October 21, 2014
- Running time: 91 minutes
- Countries: Germany; United States
- Language: English
- Budget: $1 million

Wrong Turn 6: Last Resort (Note: Titled onscreen as Wrong Turn VI) is a 2014 slasher film directed by Valeri Milev. It serves as a reboot and the sixth installment in the Wrong Turn film series. Starring Anthony Ilott, Chris Jarvis, Aqueela Zoll and Sadie Katz, it follows a sudden and mysterious inheritance that sends Danny and his friends traveling to Hobb Springs, a forgotten resort deep in the West Virginia hills that is being watchfully looked after by Jackson and Sally, only to encounter the terrifying cannibals.

Wrong Turn 6: Last Resort was released on DVD and digitally on October 21, 2014, by 20th Century Fox Home Entertainment. The film received negative reviews, and had grossed $1 million in home sales. It was followed by another entry, titled simply Wrong Turn (2021).

== Plot ==
Two bikers have sex in a natural hot tub in the mountains. The Hillicker brothers Three Finger, Saw Tooth, and One Eye murder them at a bike trail in West Virginia. The brothers are under the care of their demented relatives Jackson and Sally, the caretakers of the local hotel resort Hobbs Springs. Danny arrives at the resort, run by his cousins Sally and Jackson, to claim inheritance. He is accompanied by his girlfriend Toni, her brother Rod, and their friends Vic, Charlie, Bryan with his girlfriend Jillian. Unbeknownst to them, the resort is run and inhabited by cannibals. The elderly guest Agnes Fields is struck by an axe, pinning her to the wall where Jackson kills her.

Bryan and Jillian, who are shopping for groceries the next day, are informed by a concerned Sheriff Doucette of the disappearances of the townsfolk, including the hotel guests and Agnes. As he drives away, Doucette runs into a roadblock where he is killed by Three Finger. Alarmed by Bryan and Jillian's news of the townsfolk's fate, the group becomes suspicious of Danny’s cousins along with his need to stay with his family causing his relationship with the others to deteriorate. Toni sends Vic out into the woods to find Danny, who has gone hunting with Jackson. Vic sees Saw Tooth devouring a deer that was killed by Danny. When Danny plans on renovating the hotel to re-open next year, his friends reluctantly agree to stay. Jillian and Bryan, however, plan to leave the town and steal items from the hotel for money. While doing so, they discover a hidden door to a basement that leads to an underground bathhouse where Jillian gets horny and seduces Bryan into having sex with her. Right after Bryan makes Jillian climax midway through, the cannibals abruptly attack the couple. Bryan is hit in the head, giving him a crippling brain injury, and then Jillian is brutally dismembered without Bryan to protect her, but Sally stops them from killing Bryan. She then drags him to her bedroom and rapes him. Next, she asphyxiates him with her pillow under Jackson's orders.

Now turning against his friends during a heated argument with Toni, Danny is introduced by Jackson and Sally to his long-lost cannibalistic relatives at the clearing. They explain to Danny, who is a Hillicker, of their origins. Vic follows them and overhears their conversation. He is then captured by the Hillickers, who cut his throat and tear his innards out for the whole clan to eat for the ceremony. As the rest of the group begins to leave the next morning, Toni, Rod, and Charlie discover Jackson cooking meals in the kitchen with the dismembered corpses of the victims, including Bryan and Jillian. Horrified, they attempt to escape, only to run into the cannibals who kill both Charlie and Rod. Toni arms herself with a rifle from the armory and enters the bathhouse to confront Sally about manipulating Danny against his friends. As they fight, Toni disfigures Sally and shoots off her leg with the rifle. Enraged, Jackson orders Danny to kill Toni, but he lets her escape. Jackson pursues her until Toni retaliates by stabbing him in the head with the door keys, killing him. Danny, angered with Toni for killing Jackson, allows the cannibals to kill her, with Three Finger hitting Toni in the head with a hatchet.

One year after the reopening of the resort, renamed Hillicker Springs, Danny becomes the new manager and continues the sordid family tradition by having sex with Sally at the bathhouse as the other Hillickers watch as he does it.

== Cast ==
- Anthony Ilott as Danny
- Chris Jarvis as Jackson
- Aqueela Zoll as Toni
- Sadie Katz as Sally
- Rollo Skinner as Vic
- Billy Ashworth as Rod
- Harry Belcher as Charlie
- Joe Gaminara as Bryan
- Roxanne Pallett as Jillian
- Radoslav Parvanov as Three Finger
- Danko Jordanov as Saw Tooth
- Asen Asenov as One Eye
- Kicker Robinson as Sheriff Doucette
- Talitha Luke-Eardley as Daria
- Luke Cousins as Nick
- Josie Kidd as Agnes Fields
- Venetka Georgieva as Overweight Woman

== Production ==
Director Declan O'Brien was replaced by film director Valeri Milev for the sixth installment in the Wrong Turn film series., which originally served as a sequel to Wrong Turn 5: Bloodlines (2012) to complete the prequel trilogy, but was scrapped. Shooting for the sixth film was reported to have commenced in March 2014 in Bulgaria.

== Home media ==
Fox Home Entertainment released it on home video on October 21, 2014. It grossed over $1 million in combined DVD and Blu-ray sales in North America.

== Reception ==
28 Days Later Analysis reported on it being ten years "since actress Eliza Dushku played Jessie, a woman chased by a gang of cannibal hillbillies. A ten year run with five sequels makes the Wrong Turn film series one of the longest running horror franchises in recent history." Joel Harley of Starburst rated it 7 out of 10 and wrote, "If anything, this is one of the best entries yet." Steve Barton of Dread Central rated it 1.5 out of 5 stars and called it "all crap with a few good moments", though he praised Sadie Katz's acting.

== Court case ==
In October 2014, a court case was filed in Ireland over the unauthorized use of a photo of a woman who went missing in County Wexford. The judge declined to issue a temporary injunction, but the case came back to court in early November 2014. As a result of the lawsuit, distributor 20th Century Fox recalled all DVD and Blu-ray releases of the film with no plan to re-press or re-release and have also pulled all online streaming sources. The movie was eventually re-released with the photo in question blurred out.
