= Bullets of Justice =

- Directed by: Valeri Milev
- Screenplay by: Valeri Milev; Timur Turisbekov
- Produced by: Timur Turisbekov
- Starring: Danny Trejo; Timur Turisbekov; Yana Marinova
- Cinematography: Orlin Ruevski
- Edited by: Valeri Milev
- Music by: Timur Turisbekov
- Production company: Zenit TT
- Distributed by: The Horror Collective
- Release date: 23 August 2019 (FrightFest)
- Country: Bulgaria
- Language: English

Bullets of Justice is a 2019 Bulgarian film made by Valeri Milev and Timur Turisbekov. Originally shot in 2017 as a pilot episode for a series, after a reconsideration of a concept it was eventually extended into a full feature film premiering at London FrightFest Film Festival on the 23rd of August 2019.

== Plot ==
The action takes place in the United States in the days of the Third World War. The American government initiates a secret project code named "Army Bacon" in order to create super soldier by inbreeding human beings with pigs. Twenty five years later a breed called "Muzzles" have occupied the top of the food chain, farming and eating well-fattened humans like livestock.

Rob Justice (Timur Turisbekov) is an ex-bounty hunter working for the last line of human resistance - a group of survivors hiding in a nuclear bunker deep underground. Justice is hired to find out how the "muzzles" came to power and how to destroy them.

== Cast ==
- Danny Trejo as Grave-Digger
- Timur Turisbekov as Rob Justice
- Yana Marinova as Nina
- Dessy Slavova as Lena
- Doroteya Toleva as Raksha
- Ester Chardaklieva as Olga

== Film crew ==
- Director — Valeri Milev
- Screenwriters — Valeri Milev, Timur Turisbekov
- Producer — Timur Turisbekov
- Operator — Orlin Ruevski
- Costume designer — Nikolai Kirilov

== Production ==
The pilot episode was shot in 2017 in Kazakhstan and is a sequel of the Project Zenit group's clip “Қанағаттандырылмағандықтарыңыздан” shot by Timur Turisbekov. In January 2017, a crowdfunding crowd-funding project was launched at Indiegogo to raise US$100,000 as funds for the film post-production. On January 31, a trailer was released. A film commercial was also shot showing more details of the filming process and participants. The movie was filmed in 17 days.

Even before the release, the show was being compared with another movie — Range 15, similar to Bullets of Justice in terms of genre and "lavishly decorated in gore", and Danny Trejo's participation in both films. It is considered that this project "has all chances to occupy its place in the world catalog of the most bloody films in Category B", and that "the show promises to be piggishly epic." Timur Turisbekov himself describes the project as "a grim satire created by a circle of friends".
