= Tenika Davis =

Canadian actress

- Davis in 2025
- Born: July 16, 1985 (age 41); Toronto, Ontario, Canada
- Occupations: Actress; model
- Years active: 2006–present

Tenika Davis (born July 16, 1985) is a Canadian actress and model.

== Career ==
Tenika Davis started her career on Canada's Next Top Model. She became the fifth eliminated in the competition. She expanded into an acting career making appearances in Wrong Turn 4: Bloody Beginnings and Debug. Davis was cast in a major recurring role as Petra Small in Jupiter's Legacy. Davis earned a starring role in Spartacus: House of Ashur, as Neferet, renamed Achillia. This show is a sequel to the Starz series Spartacus. She is the first female gladiator in the series and is central to the plot.

== Filmography ==
Film roles
Year	Title	Role	Notes
2009	Saw VI	Irate Clinic Woman	
2011	Jumping the Broom	Lauren	
2011	Wrong Turn 4: Bloody Beginnings	Sara	Direct-to-video
2014	Debug	Prisoner	
2016	Adorn	Akua	Short film
2020	Perpetual Motion	Furia	

Television roles
Year	Title	Role	Notes
2006	Canada's Next Top Model	Herself	Finished sixth place
2007	Da Kink in My Hair	Hot Girlfriend	Episode: "Rules are Made"
2009	Degrassi Goes Hollywood	Yvette	TV movie
2009	The Listener	Bartender	Episode: "Some Kinda Love"
2011	Skins	Jamazia	Episode: "Tony"
2011	Lost Girl	Selma	Episode: "Mirror, Mirror"
2012	Space Janitors	Fano Dasha	1 episode
2014	Murdoch Mysteries	Hattie Carter	Episode: "Murdoch in Ragtime"
2014	Beauty & the Beast	Margaret Sutter	Episode: "Redemption"
2014	The Listener	Wendy Rivers	Episode: "Zero Recall"
2015	The Book of Negroes	Sanu's Daughter	Miniseries
2015	19-2	Gloria Linarose	3 episodes
2017	Incorporated	Mira	2 episodes
2018	Private Eyes	Cynthia 'Cyn' Flores	Episode: "Kissing the Canvas"
2018	A Shoe Addict's Christmas	Lorna	TV movie
2018	Big Top Academy	Lucy Zolta	3 episodes
2018	Half UnTold	Zuri	TV Pilot
2021	Jupiter's Legacy	Petra Small / The Flare II	Recurring
2021	Titans	Myrrha	Episode: "Souls"
2022	Guillermo del Toro's Cabinet of Curiosities	Mariana	Episode: "Dreams in the Witch House"
2025–26	Spartacus: House of Ashur	Neferet / Achillia	Main role
