= Yana Marinova =

Bulgarian actress

- Яна Маринова
- Born: 17 August 1978 (age 47); Sofia, Bulgaria
- Occupation: Actress
- Years active: 2004–present
- Height: 5 ft 6 in (1.68 m)
- Children: 1

Yana Marinova (Bulgarian: Яна Маринова, born 17 August 1978) is a Bulgarian actress.

== Life and career ==
Yana was born on 17 August 1978 and completed higher education in economics. She married at 22 years old and has a son. She participates in Bulgarian feature films and serials, as well as foreign productions. She has presented various TV shows, and performs as a stuntwoman in some movies.

She is one of the advertising faces of Garnier Cosmetics.

== Television ==
In 2015, Yana Marinova played Elena Atanasova in the BTV series Glass Home.

Since 2015, she has hosted The Voice Bulgaria.

From 2016, Marinova has played in BTV movie XIa.

== Filmography ==
Film
Year	Title	Role	Notes
2004	Hotel "Bulgaria"	Kalina	
2007	Lake Placid 2	Sharon	
2008	Lyudmil & Roslana	Veronica	
2009	Annihilation Earth	Clarissa	
2012	True Bloodthirst	Cassandra	
2013	Supercollider	Dr. Frung	
2014	Living Legends	Monika	
2014	Sniper: Legacy	Crane	
2015	The 11th Grade	Lina	
2016	Labyrinths of Love		
2017	Family BG	Elena	Short Film
2017	Security	Female SUV Agent #2	
2018	Attraction	Lora Angelova	
2019	Bullets of Justice	Nina	
2019	Pelikanblut	Sigrid	
2019	Wildings	Boriana	
2020	Action	Secretary	

Television
Year	Title	Role	Notes
2005-2007	Elegantno	Herself (host)	TV show
2009	The Immortal Voyage of Captain Drake	Oracle	TV movie
2009	Lasko — Die Faust Gottes	Ares's wife	1 episode
2009	Star Runners	Stark	TV movie
2009	Zabranena Lyubov	Eva Zaharieva	1 episode
2010-2012	Glass Home	Elena Atanasova	Main Role, 24 episodes
2013	The Voice of Bulgaria	Herself (host)	TV reality show
2013	Slavi's Show	Herself	TV show (1 episode)
2013-2014	Familiata	Lora Arnaudova	Main Role, 34 episodes
2015-2016	Ties	Yasmina Mihailovich	Main Role
2017	Bullets of Justice	Nina	Main Cast
2018-2019	Prespav	Hotel manager/owner	Main cast

Theater
Year	Title	Role	Director
2010	Cloud Paradise	Valya	Bogdan Petkanin
2012	Smyah v zalata	Vicki	Asen Blatechki
2013	Crimes of the Heart	Leni	Bogdan Petkanin
2015	Popcorns	Bruke	Asen Blatechki
