= Hydra (film) =

- Written by: Peter Sullivan
- Directed by: Andrew Prendergast
- Starring: George Stults; Dawn Olivieri; Polly Shannon
- Music by: Gregory Tripi
- Country of origin: United States
- Original language: English

Production
- Producers: Daniel Gilboy; Lisa M. Hansen; Paul Hertzberg
- Cinematography: Howard Wexler
- Editors: Max (Logan) Boyer; Marcus Manton
- Running time: 91 minutes
- Production company: CineTel Films
- Budget: 700,000 € (estimated)

Original release
- Network: Syfy
- Release: February 22, 2009

Hydra (also known as Hydra: The Lost Island) is a 2009 low-budget monster movie by Andrew Prendergast and Peter Sullivan, which blends elements of horror, action, thriller and classical mythology. It was made for cable TV and subsequently internationally distributed on DVD.

== Plot ==
Young archaeologist Dr. Valerie Cammon and her colleague Dr. Kim go by ship to a volcanic island in the Mediterranean sea. While she seeks relics in a cave, a seaquake sinks their ship without survivors. At about the same time all archaeologists except for Dr. Cammon get eaten by the re-awakened ancient Lernaean Hydra.

During the tempest, a whole island disappears. Two months later, Vincent and Dixie Camden intended to organize a man-hunt for cranky millionaires. Their Captain, unaware of the Hydra, suggests the nearby, aforementioned island as a substitute.

Four ex-convicts, Tim Nolan, Gwen Russell, Bob Crick and Ronnie Kaplan, are marooned at the shore and given 24 hours' headstart.

The following day the rich hunters arrive, having been informed that their targets are responsible for various crimes similar to their personal losses in their lives (Kaplan killed a woman in a drunk driving crash, Crick raped and murdered another woman, and Gwen hired a hitman to kill her husband, although Nolan was randomly selected as the intended fourth victim had a heart attack during the abduction). However, the hunters attract the Hydra's attention and get eaten. The same fate befalls some of the fugitives.

Dr. Cammon runs into the surviving fugitives and helps Tim to find the magic sword of Hercules. As Dr. Cammon tries to distract the Hydra, Tim gets the sword so he can now fight the beast, but, sadly, he retrieves the sword too late and Dr. Cammon is torn apart and eaten by the Hydra. Tim manages to cut off its heads for good, but fails to cut the last head completely off. With Dr. Cammon dead, the remaining fugitives are forced to go on without her help.

Eventually, the only ones left are Tim and Gwen and they return to the ship, not knowing that the Hydra has recovered and is following them. Now only one-headed, it can move like a snake and makes its way into the belly of the ship.

Gwen wants to use the radio for calling SOS but the microphone is damaged. Mr. Camden blindsides her and blackmails Tim. The Hydra kills Camden from behind, then devours Dixie. Tim grabs the magic sword again and this time, he really kills the monster.

== Cast ==
- George Stults as Tim Nolan
- Dawn Olivieri as Gwen Russell
- Michael Shamus Wiles as Captain Sweet
- Alex McArthur as Vincent Camden
- Texas Battle as Ronnie Kaplan
- Polly Shannon as Dr. Valerie Cammon
- James Wlcek as Bob Crick
- Ricco Ross as Broughton
- Roark Critchlow as Sean Trotta
- William Gregory Lee as Clarence Elkins
- Dwayne Adway as Mr. Winters
- Jana Williams Dixie Camden
- Paul Rae as Alex Williams
- Matthew Willig as Gunner
- Antonio D. Charity as Knut
- Philip Moon as Dr. Kim
- Michael Miranda as Scott
- Diego Villarreal Garcia as Panos
- Frank Alvarez as Otto
- Graham Shiels as Horst
- Edward P. Blinn as Daniel the Technician (as Ed Blinn)
- Tony Bracken as Boat Driver

== Reviews ==
I enjoyed this movie way much more than it probably has any right to be enjoyed

— Christopher Armstead– Film Critics United

== See also ==
- Dragonheart
- The Lost World
- The Water Horse: Legend of the Deep
- Cyclops
