= Cyclops (2008 film) =

- DVD cover
- Screenplay by: Frances Doel
- Directed by: Declan O'Brien
- Starring: Eric Roberts; Kevin Stapleton; Frida Farrell
- Theme music composer: Tom Hiel
- Country of origin: United States
- Original language: English

Production
- Producers: Julie Corman; Roger Corman
- Cinematography: Emil Topuzov
- Editors: Vikram Kale; Olena Kuhtaryeva
- Running time: 90 minutes

Original release
- Release: December 6, 2008

Cyclops is a 2008 television monster horror film about the mythological cyclops. Here the cyclops is the last survivor of species who once fought the Roman Army and ends up in the Circus Maximus.

== Plot ==
The film is set in Ancient Rome during the reign of Emperor Tiberius. In the countryside, a group of travelers come across some sheep and kill some for food. They are interrupted by their owner, a ferocious cyclops, the last of his kind, which kills them all but one who escapes back to Rome. There he sends word to the Emperor that a cyclops has been sighted. He sends his best commander Marcus Romulus (Kevin Stapleton) to capture the mankiller. Though it costs him some of his men, Marcus succeeds and takes the cyclops back to Rome. Emperor Tiberius needs a new beast for his circus. When he sees how much attention the cyclops attracts, the emperor decides to use him instead of expensive lions.

A group of defiant slaves learn they are about to become cyclops fodder. They flee but in spite of all efforts the fugitives are caught rather soon. Although Marcus leads the contingent which captures them, he is against slavery and argues with the emperor's main consultant Falco (Craig Archibald). The infuriated Tiberius Caesar punishes Marcus for his insubordination by sporting him as a gladiator. Marcus does well in the arena and discovers he can teach the cyclops words and simple ideas while the swift giant is in his cell. Finally, the emperor promises the cyclops freedom in return for killing Marcus. Yet the cyclops decides otherwise and kills the emperor, only to be killed in return by Falco. Marcus avenges the cyclops and becomes the liberator of Rome.

== Cast ==
- Eric Roberts as Emperor Tiberius Caesar
- Kevin Stapleton as Marcus Romulus
- Frida Farrell as Barbara
- Craig Archibald as Falco
- Mike Straub as Gordian
- David McFarland as Severus
- Raicho Vasilev as Tarquin
- Dimitar Maslarski as Cyclops (Motion Capture)
- Harry Anichkin as Casca
- Velizar Binev as Cletus

== See also ==
- Hydra (film)
- Sharktopus
