= Wrong Turn 5: Bloodlines =

2012 film by Declan O'Brien

- Official DVD cover
- Directed by: Declan O'Brien
- Written by: Declan O'Brien
- Based on: Characters by Alan B. McElroy
- Produced by: Jeffery Beach; Phillip Roth
- Starring: Doug Bradley; Camilla Arfwedson; Simon Ginty; Roxanne McKee; Paul Luebke; Oliver Hoare; Kyle Redmond Jones
- Cinematography: Emil Topuzov
- Edited by: Stein Myhrstad; Ludmil Kazakov
- Music by: Claude Foisy
- Production companies: Constantin Film; Summit Entertainment
- Distributed by: 20th Century Fox Home Entertainment
- Release date: October 23, 2012
- Running time: 91 minutes
- Countries: Germany; United States
- Language: English

Wrong Turn 5: Bloodlines (also known as Wrong Turn 5) is a 2012 slasher film written and directed by Declan O'Brien. The film stars Doug Bradley, Camilla Arfwedson, Simon Ginty, Roxanne McKee, Paul Luebke, Oliver Hoare, and Kyle Redmond Jones. It is the fifth installment in the Wrong Turn film series, and is both a sequel to Wrong Turn 4: Bloody Beginnings (2011), and the second part of the prequel to Wrong Turn (2003). The film follows a group of college students, on a trip to the Mountain Man Festival on Halloween in West Virginia, who encounter a clan of cannibals.

Wrong Turn 5: Bloodlines was released on DVD and Blu-ray on October 23, 2012. It received negative reviews from critics. The film was followed by Wrong Turn 6: Last Resort (2014).

== Plot ==
Nine months after the sanatorium massacre, in the city of Fairlake, Greenbrier County in West Virginia, the Hillickers—Three Finger, Saw Tooth, and One Eye—prepare a murdering rampage. With the help of their father Maynard Odets, they murder news reporter Kaleen Webber.

For Halloween, five friends, Billy, his girlfriend Cruz, Lita, her boyfriend Gus, and Julian, go to Fairlake to attend the Mountain Man Music Festival. Along the way, they almost run over Maynard, who attacks them. Billy, Gus, and Julian attack him out of self-defense but are all apprehended along with Lita and Cruz by town sheriff Angela Carter and her deputy partner Kevin Biggs, for being in possession of drugs. While Carter leaves to take them to the police station, the cannibals appear and kill Biggs. Locked up in the police station, Billy convinces Carter to release his friends as he owns the drugs, and they leave as he remains in his cell.

The cannibals use their truck to pull down a phone pole, taking out the service to the town. They then proceed to the power plant, killing a guard and shutting down the town's electricity. While most townspeople attend the festival, the teens register at a motel to stay while waiting for their friend to be released by his family's lawyer. Three Finger chases Cruz and kills her on her way to visit Billy. After Julian leaves the motel back to the police station, Gus is abducted by the cannibals while One Eye attempts to capture Lita, but she manages to escape.

Carter sees the cannibals drop Gus, who had his legs crippled. She attempts to save him, but the cannibals run him over with their pick-up truck, killing him. Carter frees Billy and gives him, Julian, and prisoner Mose shotguns to guard the station. She sneaks into an appliance store to communicate with radio jockey Teddy, asking him to call for backup, but he rudely dismisses her message as a joke. After Lita reaches the police station, Billy and Julian leave to search for Cruz despite Carter's objections. They wander the streets and find Cruz's dead body; while trying to get the body back to the station, they encounter the cannibals, who capture them and place them on a football pitch, where Three Finger kills both with a snowblower. Carter then sends Mose to search for the deputies, but he unknowingly runs over a barbed wire in the road and crashes. He awakens to find himself captured by the cannibals, who burn him alive. After hearing Mose's screams over the radio, Carter exits the station as Lita unwittingly releases Maynard, who stabs her eyes out. Carter finds her husband Jason bound in a car and tries to help him, but a sickle tied to the door guts his body as Three Finger fights the sheriff before overpowering and capturing her.

Carter awakens in the jail cell with her hands tied to the ceiling. Maynard gives her the option of dying by fire or from a shotgun with the trigger near her feet. Carter eventually triggers the shotgun, killing herself as the cell burns down. Lita, unable to see, is captured by Maynard and his cannibal sons before being driven away into the woods, screaming.

== Cast ==
- Doug Bradley as Maynard Odets
- Camilla Arfwedson as Sheriff Angela Carter
- Roxanne McKee as Lita Marquez
- Simon Ginty as Billy
- Paul Luebke as Gus
- Oliver Hoare as Julian
- Amy Lennox as Cruz Wilson
- Kyle Redmond Jones as Deputy Kevin Biggs
- Duncan Wisbey as Mose
- Borislav Iliev as Three Finger
- George Karlukovski as Saw Tooth
- Radoslav Parvanov as One Eye
- Peter Brooke as Jason Carter
- Finn Jones as Teddy
- Emilia Klayn as Kaleen Webber
- Andrew Bone as George
- Rosie Holden as Virginia 'Ginny' Kelly
- Harry Anichkin as Doctor Rick
- Velizar Peev as Night Watchman
- Svilen Cholakov as Deputy Mike
- Borisa Tutundjieva as Linda

== Reception ==
View More Kevin Carr of 7M Pictures gave it 1.5 out of 5 and wrote: "Unfortunately, the Wrong Turn series is becoming more like the Leprechaun series than anything else." Scott Weinberg of FEARnet rated it 2.5 out of 5 and called it "Cheap, dumb, and not even remotely scary -- but it has lots of crazy kills and nasty splatter, which is why it exists."

== Home media ==
The film was released on DVD and Blu-ray on October 23, 2012. The Blu-ray edition is a two-disc set which includes a Blu-ray disc of the feature film, as well as a DVD/Digital Copy disc.

== Reboot ==
A reboot titled Wrong Turn 6: Last Resort, was released in 2014.
