= Party Bus to Hell =

- Official film poster
- Directed by: Rolfe Kanefsky
- Written by: Rolfe Kanefsky
- Starring: Tara Reid; Sadie Katz; Stefani Blake; Demetrios Alex; Ben Stobber; ViDonna Michaels; Shelby McCullough; Ray Gutierrez; Richard Hochman; John Molinaro; Devanny Pinn
- Cinematography: Michael Su
- Edited by: Jay Woelfel
- Music by: Christopher Farrell
- Production companies: Mahal Empire; Patel Films
- Release date: 30 October 2017
- Running time: 81 minutes
- Country: United States
- Language: English

Party Bus to Hell (also known as Bus Party to Hell) is a 2017 American comedy horror film directed by Rolfe Kanefsky and starring Tara Reid, Sadie Katz, Stefani Blake, Demetrios Alex, Ben Stobber, ViDonna Michaels, Shelby McCullough, Ray Gutierrez, Richard Hochman, John Molinaro, and Devanny Pinn.

== Cast ==
- Jillian Newton as Lara Swit (credited as Stefani Blake)
- Sadie Katz as Joan Starrett
- Demetrios Alex as Peter Oates
- Ben Stobber as Warren Fonda
- ViDonna Michaels as Reese Neptune
- Shelby McCullough as Ivy Roberts
- Ray Gutierrez as Stuart Parker
- Richard Hochman as Alan Armstrong
- John Molinaro as Cult Member
- Tara Reid as Darby Lewis
- Devanny Pinn as Kimberly Hudson
- Nailya Shakirova as Priestess
- Brian Blu as Fik
- Elissa Dowling as Sect
- Michael Forsch as Lloyd Band
- J Spencer as J Spanner
- Robert Rhine as Bob McReady
- Aaron Groben as Mike

== Release ==
The film premiered in Las Vegas on 30 October 2017. It was released to VOD on 13 April 2018.

== Reception ==
Matt Boiselle of Dread Central rated the film 3.5 stars out of 5 and called it a "psychotic, carnage-wracked, breast-fest best suited for a late Saturday night watch".

Paul Parcellin of Film Threat gave the film a score of 6.5/10 and wrote that "fans of campy horror flicks who have an ironic appreciation for low-budget B-movies may find this one right up their alley."

Andrew Pollard of Starburst rated the film 2 stars out of 10 pand wrote: "Classless, crude, downright sleazy, and nowhere near as edgy and cool as it may well think it is, Party Bus to Hell is a dud of the highest order."
