= Scorned (2013 film) =

- Directed by: Mark Jones
- Written by: Mark Jones; Sadie Katz
- Produced by: Robert Beaumont; Todd Blatt; Audrey Delaney
- Starring: AnnaLynne McCord; Billy Zane; Viva Bianca; Sadie Katz
- Cinematography: Mark Melville
- Edited by: John Blizek
- Production company: Horse Head Pictures
- Distributed by: Anchor Bay Films
- Release date: November 2013
- Running time: 86 minutes
- Country: United States
- Language: English

Scorned is an American psychological thriller directed by Mark Jones and written by Jones and Sadie Katz. It was released in November 2013 in South Korea, and on February 4, 2014 in the United States. The film stars AnnaLynne McCord, Billy Zane and Viva Bianca. The story is about a woman who discovers her boyfriend is having an affair with her best friend. She goes crazy and decides to take revenge on them.

== Plot ==
Kevin and Sadie have been dating for six months, and Sadie tells her friend Jennifer that she believes Kevin will propose to her on a weekend getaway, and invites her to be maid of honor. Jennifer cautions Sadie about marrying a man she has only known six months. At their weekend away, Sadie finds a sexual text from another woman on Kevin's phone

An argument ensues, and Sadie pepper-sprays Kevin and knocks him out with a fireplace log. Kevin awakens tied to a chair. At first confused and seemingly believing it to be some sexual fantasy, he remains calm. However, Sadie tells him that she knows about his affair with Jennifer. Sadie, pretending to be Kevin, says Sadie and Kevin have broken up and invites Jennifer to join him. Sadie takes Kevin to their bedroom, ties him to the bed and gags him, then places candles and rose petals as well as some spiked champagne for Jennifer. Jennifer arrives, follows the petals, drinks the champagne and quickly undresses.

As Jennifer reclines atop Kevin, believing his gag and other ties to be a sexual fantasy, Sadie knocks her out. Jennifer wakes up in a bathtub in which Sadie tells her that in olden days adulterers had their hair cut off, which Sadie proceeds to do to her. Jennifer and Kevin wake up with Jennifer now tied to the bed and Kevin tied to a chair. Bringing up both a microwave and Jennifer's dog, Bootsie, Sadie threatens to microwave the dog if Kevin doesn't perform oral sex on Jennifer. Sadie justifies this as being a cure for them and saying now they don't have to do it behind her back, Kevin eventually agrees. After feeding them and fending off a visiting neighbor, Sadie stops Kevin from getting his gun. In retaliation, Sadie electrocutes the pair and puts Jennifer's hand in a vise that breaks all her fingers. She also breaks Kevin's ankle with a sledge hammer.

Sadie tells Jennifer the story of her childhood dog. She loved the dog but the dog fell in love with her sister, so Sadie drowned her younger sister. She adds that she never blamed the dog. It is revealed Sadie spent time in an asylum after the police realized her act and repeatedly underwent electroshock therapy until she was 18, explaining her high aggression. Upstairs, she tells Kevin that they need to get rid of his wandering eye and partially blinds him. Sadie takes Jennifer to a boat, planning to drown her, but Jennifer escapes and intercepts a car, only to find Sadie driving. Once caught and driving with Sadie, Jennifer falsely professes her love for Sadie, saying that the affair was to end their relationship so she could be with Sadie. Jennifer kisses Sadie and then rolls out of the car in an attempt to get away but hurts herself. Sadie gets out of the car and chokes Jennifer, seemingly, to death.

Driving away, Sadie is pulled over by the police who tell her that a criminal has broken out of jail and she should keep an eye out. Jennifer, however, is still alive and stumbles toward the police, only to be hit by an oncoming truck. Sadie drives away and, finding the criminal, lets him into the car. She proceeds to have sex with him and then kills him, thanking him for being her alibi. Driving back to the house, she finds Kevin has broken free and chases him. Kevin dodges the bullets she fires and manages to make it to the boat, but dies in the ensuing fight. Sadie sets up the scene as if the criminal raped her and killed her boyfriend and tells this to the police, using her mangled fingers, which she also put in the vise, as evidence. A few months later, Sadie has a new boyfriend, who is revealed to be cheating on her, too.

== Cast ==
- AnnaLynne McCord as Sadie
- Billy Zane as Kevin
- Viva Bianca as Jennifer
- Doug Drucker as Scary Guy
- Marian Weage as Mrs. Wilkes
- Jim Midock as Heavier Cop
- Juan-Pablo Veza as Other Cop
- Scott Knisley as Detective
- Martin Sprock as Detective Partner
- Sadie Katz as The Waitress

== Reception ==
William Harrison of DVD Talk rated it 1/5 stars and wrote, "Neither scary nor funny enough to entertain, this one is dead on arrival." Mac McEntire of DVD Verdict called it "light on thrills and even lighter on sex". Patrick Cooper of Bloody Disgusting rated it 1.5/5 stars and wrote, "It seems like Scorned is grasping to be an edgy revenge flick, but its delivery simply falls flat." Anthony Arrigo of Dread Central rated it 1/5 stars and wrote, "Writer & director Mark Jones' utterly banal tale of cheating and revenge is so by-the-numbers you'd swear it was written using a Mad Libs for Scripts book." Staci Layne Wilson, also of Dread Central, rated it 3/5 stars and called it "a well-paced, briskly-written and well-acted indie which keeps on topping itself in terms of twists and turns."
