= Re-Kill =

- Theatrical poster
- Directed by: Valeri Milev
- Written by: Mike Hurst
- Produced by: Courtney Solomon; Stephanie Caleb; Moshe Diamant
- Starring: Scott Adkins; Bruce Payne; Daniella Alonso
- Cinematography: Anton Bakarski
- Edited by: Ryan Dufrene
- Music by: Justin Burnett
- Production companies: Midsummer Films; After Dark Films
- Distributed by: After Dark Films
- Release date: 16 October 2015 (After Dark Horrorfest)
- Running time: 87 minutes
- Country: United States
- Language: English
- Budget: $9.5 million

Re-Kill is a 2015 American horror film directed by Valeri Milev and written by Michael Hurst. It stars Scott Adkins, Bruce Payne, and Daniella Alonso as members of a paramilitary group tasked with hunting down and destroying zombies after an outbreak.

== Plot ==
A young girl returns home to find her parents missing and the house in disarray. She sits down to watch TV, and the news reveals that five years earlier, a zombie outbreak killed off 4.5 billion people worldwide, 10 million of whom are from the USA. After detonating a nuclear bomb over San Francisco and walling off NYC, the U.S. government declared the outbreak over and established a paramilitary force known as R-Division to hunt down and destroy the remaining zombies. The girl watches a reality TV series called Re-Kill that broadcasts live footage of R-Division squads. Commercials interrupt the show, showing attempts to repopulate the USA and reassure the populace.

The show begins with a recap. An embedded journalist accompanies a squad on a raid to New Orleans, which has had reports of zombie activity. The squad is overrun, and only two people make it to a car: Alex Winston and the journalist. When the journalist stops speaking coherently and moans uncontrollably, Winston realizes she is infected and shoots her. The government promises that the situation is under control and clears out the zombies. Winston is reassigned to Division 8, which includes new recruit Tom Falkirk, former thief Omar Hernandez, immigrant Nguyen, Rose Matthews, "Grizzly" Adams, conspiracy theorist Trent Parker, and the squad leader, Sarge.

Along with embedded journalists Jimmy and Bobby, Division 8 is sent to investigate reports of a family that is harboring reanimated members. Sarge explains that the outbreak spread so far because people could not give up hope that their loved ones could be saved. After neutralizing the human resistance, the soldiers rescue prisoners kept chained up for zombie food. One of the family members reveals that his sister, a zombie, is kept in the attic. Before she can be put down, she bites Tom, who is mercy-killed to prevent him from turning into a zombie. In interviews, Parker is dismissive of Tom's sacrifice, and Sarge says that it is a known risk of the job.

Division 8's next job is to investigate a truck suspected of carrying contraband. When they finally stop the truck, they find it is full of zombies. Sarge uses a RPG to clear out the zombies. The truckers initially profess ignorance of their cargo but eventually confirm rumors of the Judas Project, a shadowy program rumored to be an experiment on the zombies trapped in NYC. Parker believes it is a secret military project, but Sarge is more concerned about the possibility of a second outbreak, which he believes is inevitable given human nature.

In the forbidden areas of NYC known as The Zone, they discover dead scientists and zombies who seem more intelligent. After an ambush, Omar insists that Parker was bitten and demands that they kill him. Before they kill him, Parker opens fire on the squad, killing Adams. Winston is wounded next, and he sacrifices himself with a grenade to allow the others to escape. In a previously recorded interview, he describes his belief that the government has secretly organized an ark for eligible survivors; he posthumously wishes the squad well and hopes they are accepted there. Deeper in the Zone, Hernandez is bitten and turns.

As the squad faces a horde of zombies, including Hernandez, a man who claims to be the last remaining member of the Judas Project, leads them to safety, but Nguyen falls behind and is killed. He explains the project was designed to turn the zombies against each other, but it instead revealed an alpha zombie, nicknamed Elvis, capable of leading a zombie army. Jimmy says the network's drones will pick up and broadcast footage of him and Bobby every two hours. As they perform reconnaissance, Bobby dies, alerting the zombie army. The squad flees, but Sarge and the Scientist are killed by the horde. Elvis appears and kills Jimmy and throws Rose out of a window. He tries strangling her to death, but she kills him and escapes The Zone. As a special news report reveals zombie activity near the Zone and the start of a new outbreak, the young girl who was watching the program is revealed to have transformed into a zombie. Elsewhere, it is shown that the ark is real, and soldiers, including Rose, discuss having found groups of survivors.

== Cast ==
- Scott Adkins as Trent Parker
- Daniella Alonso as Rose Matthews
- Bruce Payne as Alex Winston
- Roger Cross as Sarge
- Jesse Garcia as Omar Hernandez
- Rocky Marshall as Langford
- Layke Anderson as Tom Falkirk
- Raicho Vasilev as Elvis
- Dimiter Doichinov as "Grizzly" Adams
- Yo Santhaveesuk as Nguyen
- Randall Kamm as Male Anchor
- Cat Tomeny as News Anchor

== Production ==
The film is part of the eight film series After Dark Films Originals. The After Dark Horrorfest 8 Films to Die For brand and After Dark Films produced in cooperation with Lionsgate and NBC Universal's Syfy. Principal photography began in July 2010 in Sofia, Bulgaria, and was directed by Bulgarian filmmaker Valeri Milev.

== Release ==
It was released by Lionsgate in the US on 16 October 2015 and is part of the After Dark Originals Film Festival.

== Reception ==
Pat Torfe of Bloody Disgusting rated it 3/5 stars and wrote that although the film's premise of a zombie-hunting reality TV show is new, the components of the film have been done before. Torfe said the commercials enhance the verisimilitude but break the flow of the film. Ari Drew of Dread Central rated it 2/5 stars and wrote that the film should have focused more on the tone used in the satirical commercials rather than repetitive and clichéd scenes of zombie fighting. Mark L. Miller of Ain't It Cool News wrote, "While there are some decent scenes of gore and zombie terror, it just seems so unoriginal and tired."
