= The Warrior Class =

2007 film by Alan Hruska

- Promotional poster
- Directed by: Alan Hruska
- Written by: Alan Hruska
- Produced by: Laird Adamson; Petina Cole; Jill Footlick; Rachel Peters
- Starring: Anson Mount; Erica Leerhsen; Robert Vaughn; Jake Weber; Jamey Sheridan; Dan Hedaya
- Cinematography: John Thomas
- Edited by: Marc Laub
- Music by: Andy Farber
- Production companies: Archer Entertainment; The Talking Pictures Company
- Distributed by: Echo Bridge Home Entertainment
- Release date: February 6, 2007
- Running time: 110 minutes
- Country: United States
- Language: English

The Warrior Class is a 2007 American legal thriller film written and directed by Alan Hruska. It stars Anson Mount, Erica Leerhsen, Robert Vaughn, Jake Weber, Jamey Sheridan, and Dan Hedaya. It follows a rookie lawyer who gets in over his head when he falls for the wife of a mafia boss he is assigned to prosecute.

The trials in The Warrior Class were based loosely on two cases Hruska tried as a young lawyer. The film was finished in 2004, and premiered at the Hamptons International Film Festival in 2005. It was released on DVD on February 6, 2007.

== Plot ==
Rookie lawyer Alec Brno has just been assigned the case of his career: exposing a billion-dollar oil scam led by a ruthless mafia boss, Phil Anwar. When he reluctantly falls for Phil's beautiful but drug-addicted wife, Annie Sullivan, who is also his key witness, Alec soon realizes that all the legal savvy in the world can't protect him from the dangerous reality of mob violence. In a system where criminals often walk free, sometimes courtroom warriors must take the battle for justice into their own hands.

== Cast ==
- Anson Mount as Alec Brno
- Erica Leerhsen as Annie Sullivan
- Robert Vaughn as Ben Braddock
- Jake Weber as Phil Anwar
- Jamey Sheridan as Frank Macalister
- Dan Hedaya as General Rand
- Pedro Barreira as Christian
- Sage Doviak as Sarah Anwar
- Mark Blum as Hal Richardson
- Keith Randolph Smith as Harvey Grand
- Tracie Thoms as Thelma Rosbach
- Rick Stear as Jed
- Jerry Walsh as Bailiff
- Stephen Barker Turner as Whitman Poole
- David Thornton as Ray Sancerre
- Daniel Oreskes as Vito
- Clark Middleton as Carl Raffon
- Michael Medeiros as Sid Kline
- Marylouise Burke as Madge
- Sam Coppola as Abe Rosencranz
- John Cunningham as J.J. Tierney
- Ramsey Faragallah as Dr. Patel
- Kit Flanagan as Brett Creighton
- Bill Hunter as Larry Stahl
- Adam LeFevre as Jim Velsor
- Christopher Wynkoop as Judge Locklear
- Thom Christopher as Judge Kaye
- Benja K. Thomas as Proprietress
- Allen McCullough as Police Officer
- Gray Madder as O.C.D. Patient
- Dominic Marcus as Gym Reporter
- Richard Poe as Magistrate
- Ed Schiff as District Attorney

== Reception ==
=== Critical response ===
Ronnie Scheib of Variety stated that "strong cast builds considerable goodwill toward the narrative, but the script's internal logic is as formulaic and half-baked as the pic's action is blocky and unconvincing."
