= The Immortal (2000 TV series) =

- Genre: Action/Adventure
- Created by: Cary Solomon; Chuck Konzelman
- Starring: Lorenzo Lamas; Steve Braun; April Telek
- Composer: Schaun Tozer
- Country of origin: Canada
- Original language: English
- No. of seasons: 1
- No. of episodes: 22

Production
- Executive producers: Michael Grais; Harel Goldstein; Tim Gamble
- Running time: 60 minutes (including commercials)
- Production companies: Hilltop Entertainment; Studio Eight Productions; Peace Arch Entertainment Group

Original release
- Network: Syndication
- Release: October 7, 2000 – June 2, 2001

The Immortal is a Canadian horror-based martial arts television series which aired from October 7, 2000 to June 2001 and had 22 episodes.

== Plot ==
In 16th century Asia, Raphael Cain sees his wife slain and his daughter taken by supernatural villains from the underworld. He vows to pursue the demons through the centuries to kill them all and find his daughter, and with the help of a mystic, he is taught the magic—and samurai swordsmanship—it will require to accomplish this oath. His reluctant squire, Goodwin follows him through time and helps him in his quest. Now in the 21st century, Cain and Goodwin are joined by a psychologist, Sara Beckman, who studies otherworldly anomalies. Cain will need all the help he can get because now the lead demon, Mallos and his henchwoman, Vashista, are gathering power and making life in the 21st century America very uncomfortable.

== Reception ==
M. Ray Lott in his book The American Martial Arts Film wrote that "the resemblance to Highlander is probably not coincidental. The show, which only lasted a year, boasted some good martial arts sequences and some really bad demons."

== Cast ==
Actor	Role
Lorenzo Lamas	Raphael Cain
Steve Braun	Goodwin
April Telek	Dr. Sara Beckman
Robert Ito	Yashiro
Regan Hasegawa	Kiyomi
Dominic Keating	Mallos
Kira Clavell	Vashista
Grace Park	Mikiko
Bret Hart	"The Collector"

== Episodes ==
No.	Title	Directed by	Written by	Original release date
1	"Demons of the Night: Part 1"	David Straiton	Clint Lien	October 7, 2000
2	"Demons of the Night: Part 2"	David Straiton	Rick Drew & Clint Lien	October 14, 2000
3	"Half Way"	Gavin Wilding	Jim Henshaw	October 21, 2000
4	"Not So Dead"	Scott Summersgill	Damian Kindler & Will Dixon	October 28, 2000
5	"Wicked Wicked West"	Gilbert Shilton	Martin M. Borycki	November 4, 2000
6	"Prime Location"	Mark Jean	John Sheppard	November 11, 2000
7	"Studio D"	Ron Oliver	Martin M. Borycki	November 18, 2000
8	"Flight 666"	Bill Corcoran	Rick Drew	November 25, 2000
9	"Bride's Kiss"	Scott Summersgill	Story by : Gabriel Tick & Steven Barwin; Teleplay by : Deborah Peraya	December 2, 2000
10	"The Hunted"	Bill Corcoran	Rick Drew	December 9, 2000
11	"Forest for the Trees"	Charles Wilkinson	Martin M. Borycki	February 3, 2001
12	"The Asylum"	Charles Winkler	Rick Drew	February 10, 2001
13	"Learning Curve"	Charles Wilkinson	Damian Kindler & Will Dixon	February 17, 2001
14	"The Good Squire"	Scott Summersgill	Deborah Peraya	February 24, 2001
15	"Wired"	Scott Summersgill	Martin M. Borycki	March 3, 2001
16	"Replay"	Michael John Bateman	Rick Drew	March 10, 2001
17	"Spy vs. Spa"	Harley Cokeliss	Martin M. Borycki	April 28, 2001
18	"Happily Never After"	Scott Summersgill	Ron Oliver	May 5, 2001
19	"Deja Vu"	Harley Cokeliss	Story by : Stacey Kaser; Teleplay by : Jim Henshaw	May 12, 2001
20	"Reckoning: Part 1"	Scott Summersgill	Rick Drew	May 19, 2001
21	"Reckoning: Part 2"	Scott Summersgill	Rick Drew	May 26, 2001
22	"Kiyomi"	Ron Oliver	Rick Drew	June 2, 2001
