= Wrong Turn 2: Dead End =

2007 film by Joe Lynch

- Official DVD cover
- Directed by: Joe Lynch
- Written by: Turi Meyer; Al Septien
- Based on: Characters by Alan B. McElroy
- Produced by: Jeff Freilich
- Starring: Erica Leerhsen; Henry Rollins; Texas Battle; Aleksa Palladino; Daniella Alonso; Steve Braun; Matthew Currie Holmes; Crystal Lowe; Kimberly Caldwell
- Cinematography: Robin Loewen
- Edited by: Ed Marx
- Music by: Bear McCreary
- Production companies: Constantin Film; Summit Entertainment
- Distributed by: 20th Century Fox Home Entertainment
- Release dates: August 25, 2007 (FrightFest); October 9, 2007 (United States)
- Running time: 97 minutes
- Countries: Germany; United States; Canada
- Language: English
- Budget: $4 million

Wrong Turn 2: Dead End is a 2007 slasher film directed by Joe Lynch and written by Turi Meyer and Al Septien. An international co-production between Summit Entertainment from the United States and Constantin Film from Germany, it is a sequel to Wrong Turn (2003) and the second installment in the Wrong Turn film series. Starring Erica Leerhsen, Henry Rollins, Texas Battle, Aleksa Palladino, Daniella Alonso, Steve Braun, Matthew Currie Holmes, Crystal Lowe, and Kimberly Caldwell, and follows a group of reality show contestants fighting for their survival against a family of horribly deformed cannibals who plan to mercilessly slaughter them all.

Wrong Turn 2: Dead End had its premiere at the FrightFest on August 25, 2007, and was released on DVD in the United States on October 9, 2007, by 20th Century Fox Home Entertainment. The film received a positive response from critics, which remains the best-reviewed film in the franchise. It grossed $9.2 million in home video sales.

It is followed by Wrong Turn 3: Left for Dead (2009).

== Plot ==
Reality show contestant Kimberly is driving through the West Virginia backcountry when she accidentally hits a teenager. She stops to help him, but he bites her lips off, revealing himself as one of the cannibals. She flees but runs into Three Finger, who violently splits her in half with his axe. Three Finger and Brother drag her body halves away.

The Apocalypse: Ultimate Survivalist, a survival reality game show hosted by former U.S. Marine Colonel Dale Murphy, is in production at the West Virginia forest. Because of Kimberly's absence, the show's producer Mara reluctantly takes her place. Other contestants include: lesbian Iraq war veteran Amber, lingerie model Elena, former football player Jake, skateboarder Jonesy, and graphic artist Nina.

As the game starts, Three Finger and another mutant cannibal, Pa, murder the television crew and abduct Dale. Mara finishes a task and enters a cabin to find a telephone, and Nina follows her. While looking around the cabin, they hear the occupants return and hide in a bedroom. Mara and Nina witness a female cannibal, Ma, giving birth to a deformed baby. They are spotted by Ma's daughter, Sister, and escape through the toilet pit. They run into the woods, but Pa throws a hatchet which hits Mara in the head. Nina searches for the others as the cannibals collect Mara's corpse. At the lake, cinematographer M and Elena have sex before the former leaves, and Elena stays to tan in her underwear. When she hears a noise, she starts to get dressed as Sister emerges and slashes her to death with a machete while Pa and Ma hijack the RV and capture M.

Dale escapes captivity and battles Three Finger, ending the fight by shooting the cannibal into the lake with a shotgun. He then enters the mutant family's cabin. He finds the old gas station attendant, who reveals how the cannibals' mutations were caused by inbreeding and consumption of effluent dumped in the river from an abandoned paper mill 30 years ago. The man, who is revealed to be the grandfather of Three Finger and the two other inbred mountain men who have been killed, attacks Dale to avenge their deaths. After a brief skirmish, Dale kills the old man by blowing him up with a stick of dynamite. Meanwhile, when Nina returns to explain her story, the three other contestants are eating some meat found by Amber and Jonesy. They then realize that they have been eating Kimberly's leg. They attempt to escape, but Nina gets separated from the group while they fight Brother and Sister. Jake rescues Nina from a pit, and they jump into the river to escape Sister.

After Amber and Jonesy are killed while looking for help, Nina and Jake enter the mill and find a garage with vehicles stolen from prior victims. They find the RV, and Jake enters it only to witness Ma decapitating M on a live feed monitor inside. Nina and Jake attempt to leave, but the cannibals capture them.

The next day, Dale sneaks into the compound to distract the cannibal family who were eating dinner. He kills Brother and Sister with a dynamite stick attached to an arrow. He frees Nina and Jake but is killed by Ma and Pa, who are incensed by the deaths of their children. Nina successfully escapes, but Jake wanders into a room fitted with a large meat grinder, where he is attacked by Ma and Pa. Nina returns to the mill and kills Ma and Pa with the meat grinder. Nina and Jake find Kimberly's sportscar and drive away.

Three Finger, who survives being shot by Dale, nurses the mutant baby, feeding it with a bottle of effluent and a human finger.

== Cast ==
- Erica Leerhsen as Nina Papas
- Henry Rollins as Dale Murphy
- Texas Battle as Jake Washington
- Aleksa Palladino as Mara Stone
- Daniella Alonso as Amber Williams
- Steve Braun as Matt "Jonesy" Jones
- Matthew Currie Holmes as Michael "M" Epstein
- Crystal Lowe as Elena Garcia
- Kimberly Caldwell as Kimberly
- Wayne Robson as Old Timer / Maynard Odets
- Ken Kirzinger as Pa
- Ashlea Earl as Ma
- Clint Carleton as Brother
- Rorelee Tio as Sister
- Jeff Scrutton as Three Finger
- Cedric De Souza as Neil
- John Stewart as Wojo
- Bro Gilbert as Chris
- Patton Oswalt as Tommy (voice)

== Music ==
=== Soundtrack ===
Wrong Turn 2: Dead End

Film score by Bear McCreary
- Released: September 18, 2007
- Genres: Soundtracks; Film scores
- Length: 52:11
- Label: La-La Land

The soundtrack was released on September 18, 2007, by La-La Land Records. It is composed by Bear McCreary.

Track listing

1. "Main Title" (3:39)
2. "Ultimate Survivalist Theme Song" (3:20) by Captain Ahab
3. "Dale for Dinner" (2:33)
4. "Birth of Baby Splooge" (3:04)
5. "Nina's Theme" (2:43)
6. "Mutant Cannibal Incest" (3:01)
7. "Into the Mill" (2:49)
8. "Arrow Through Two Heads" (3:18)
9. "Dale Vigilante" (3:19)
10. "Hunting Dale" (3:40)
11. "Rescuing Nina" (3:04)
12. "Dale to the Rescue" (3:18)
13. "The Meat Grinder" (2:15)
14. "Baby Splooge Lives" (2:36)
15. "End Credits (Theme from Wrong Turn 2)" (3:39)
16. "Under Your Bones" (5:25) by Captain Ahab featuring Ivor

== Home media ==
Wrong Turn 2: Dead End was screened both at the London FrightFest Film Festival on August 25 in the United Kingdom and Austin's Fantastic Fest on September 21, 2007, in the United States, respectively.

The film was released on DVD on October 9, 2007, in an unrated version, extras including a commentary by director Joe Lynch and actors Erica Leerhsen and Henry Rollins, a second commentary by writers Turi Meyer and Al Septien, a featurette on the making of the film and the trailer. The film later released on Blu-ray on September 15, 2009. It grossed $9.2 million in home video sales in the US.

== Reception ==
On review aggregation website Rotten Tomatoes it has a rating of 70% based on reviews from 10 critics.

Steve Barton of Dread Central gave the film 4 out of 5 stars, stating that the film "is a hot ticket for some gore-soaked backwoods mayhem that gets even better with repeated viewings and lots of booze." Brian Collins of Bloody Disgusting stated that "what could have been a cheap and lazy cash-in turned out to be one of the year's better genre offerings". David Johnson of DVD Verdict said the film is "a derivative and stupid outing" but very entertaining. David Walker of DVD Talk rated the film 3.5/5 stars and called it "a consistently entertaining film" that effectively parodies and homages genre films that have come before it. Fangoria's Michael Gingold wrote that Lynch directed the film "with all the energy of a longtime hardcore horror fan getting the chance to let it all hang out in his debut feature". David Feraci from the horror-themed website CHUD believed the film has "its heart in the right place", and FEARnet's Scott Weinberg compared it to The Texas Chainsaw Massacre 2, calling it a "fast-paced and completely unapologetic love-letter to the old-school '80s splatter sequels". Anton Bitel, writing for Eye for Film, named it a "superior, self-parodic sequel".

At the Gérardmer Film Festival, the film won the Best Direct-to-Video Film Award.

== Sequel ==
A sequel titled Wrong Turn 3: Left for Dead, was released in 2009.
