= Lonely Joe =

- Directed by: Michael Coonce
- Written by: Michael Coonce
- Produced by: Jeremy Colbert; Michael Coonce; John Craddock; Dan Nicol; Jody Pucello; Qutayba Salem
- Starring: Erica Leerhsen; Matthew S. Harrison; Peter Speach; David Fine; Michael Cauchon
- Cinematography: Alan McIntyre Smith
- Release dates: March 6, 2009 (Lake County Film Festival); April 20, 2009 (United States)
- Running time: 95 minutes
- Country: United States
- Language: English

Lonely Joe is a 2009 horror film which stars Erica Leerhsen. The film has been said to be a Supernatural Horror/Thriller "in the veins of Saw and The Sixth Sense". The film is inspired by real events that took place in South Texas in the 1980s.

== Plot ==
Lonely Joe revolves around Michele Connelly (Erica Leerhsen), a New York City reporter who returns to her hometown 10 years after the mysterious murder of her younger brother to investigate and find out what actually happened several years ago. However, soon after Michele discovers a trail of bodies dating back more than fifty years, she finds herself feeling as if she is part of the story she is investigating.

== Cast ==
- Erica Leerhsen as Michele Connelly
- Peter Speach as Sheriff Pete Scoggins
- David Fine as Lonely Joe Gainard
- Michael Cauchon as Jimmy Connelly
- Jaclyn Walsh as Lisa Calero
- Robert Krigbaum as John Butler
- Mary Smith as Woman in White
- James Zahn as Steve Ford
- Andrea Fragassi as Michele's CoWorker
- Carl Kazmirski as Young Joe Gainard
- Laurence (Larry) Handy as Soldier

== Production ==
Lonely Joe began production in October 2007, in the towns of Solvay, Syracuse, Elbridge, and Geddes, New York. The film wrapped principal photography on November 6, 2007. A "post-production teaser" was cut from dailies, and placed on-line on November 7, 2007.

Doing her own stunts for the film, Erica Leerhsen was nearly hit by the train used in the dream sequence when she lost her balance and lunged forward. Her scene was shot with her only 12 inches from the side of the train as it passed by at 30 miles per hour. Unshaken, she insisted on shooting the scene again.
