= The Trip (2002 film) =

- Promotional film poster
- Directed by: Miles Swain
- Written by: Miles Swain
- Produced by: Houston King; Miles Swain
- Starring: Larry Sullivan; Steve Braun; Ray Baker; Alexis Arquette; Sirena Irwin; Jill St. John; Art Hindle
- Cinematography: Charles L. Barbee; Scott Kevan
- Edited by: Carlo Gustaff
- Music by: Steven Chesne
- Distributed by: TLA Releasing
- Release date: 2002
- Running time: 95 minutes
- Country: United States
- Language: English
- Box office: $306,567

The Trip is a 2002 American romantic drama film directed by Miles Swain. It traces the relationship between two men from their initial meeting in 1973 until 1984. A period piece featuring two opposites who fall in love in the middle of the gay rights movement, the film features historical events as a backdrop, from Anita Bryant's attempt to overturn a Florida law providing protection for gay rights in the 70s, to the AIDS outbreak in the 80s.

The film received mixed reviews from critics, but was praised by Rex Reed and the Los Angeles Times. It went on to win over a dozen film festival awards, including 2 HBO Audience Awards for best film, Best Actor for Steve Braun, and Best Director for Miles Swain.

At the time of filming Swain was a resident at Rudolph Valentino's famous estate Falcon Lair, so he decided to film most of the movie there to save money on production costs. It is the only movie ever shot on the property thanks to the former owners Doris Duke & Valentino.

== Plot ==
The time is the socially turbulent 1970s, when radical politics and the emerging gay rights movement clashed with the rigidly conservative establishment. At a swanky L.A. party, lean and lanky Tommy introduces himself to sexually repressed Alan. Tommy has long blond hair, and is openly gay with a glib sense of humor. The comparatively short-haired, muscular Alan is a member of the Young Republicans and an aspiring journalist. Alan is working on his first book, a treatise on homosexuality, and he invites Tommy over for dinner to interview him for the book. Their connection is so intense that Alan's kooky girlfriend Beverly suspects something more than an interview is going on and angrily departs.

Broken up with Beverly, Alan runs into Tommy a month later while jogging in Griffith Park and invites him for a night out; the two have a fantastic time, drinking and doing drugs along the way. At Alan's invitation, Tommy stays over at Alan's apartment. They sleep in separate rooms until Alan, in the middle of the night, joins Tommy in his bed, claiming the couch is too uncomfortable; Tommy leaves to go sleep on the couch. In the morning, Tommy tells Alan he has feelings for him and can't see him again. Tommy also confronts Alan about his own curiosity, prompting Alan to defensively blurt out, "I'm not a fag like you, okay?" Tommy walks out. Feeling horrible about what he said, Alan proceeds to call him nonstop, but Tommy won't come to the phone.

Alan proceeds to write his book, which is highly critical of gays and their lifestyle. However, when the manuscript brings an offer for a two-book deal, he doesn't want to sign the contract, as by then he realizes his own feelings for Tommy and rejects his old ideas about the gay community. Against his better judgment, he signs the contract, persuaded by attorney Peter, that it's a once-in-a-lifetime opportunity. Moments later, Tommy comes back to Alan's apartment to confront him about the phone calls and tell him he doesn't want to hear from him again. Alan takes a chance, grabbing Tommy and kissing him. It begins what will be a 4-year relationship.

Fast forward to 1977: Anita Bryant is organizing the "Save Our Children" campaign in Florida to rid the country of homosexuals and repeal a Florida law prohibiting discrimination on the basis of sexual orientation. Alan's book publisher, who previously decided the timing wasn't right, publishes Alan's book, The Straight Truth, against Alan's wishes, listing the author as "Anonymous." The book is used to fuel homophobia by the Christian Right, and it threatens to erode Tommy's work with his group Out Loud, whose aim is to change the public's negative views of gays. When word is leaked about who actually wrote the book, Tommy leaves Alan. Alan is also fired from his job at a newspaper. With nowhere to go and no job, he quickly becomes a "kept boy" of Peter, who himself is closeted.

In 1984, when Alan finds out Peter was the one who leaked his name to the media, he leaves to reunite with Tommy. The two finally take the road trip they previously planned, but under tragic circumstances, as Tommy is now ill from an undisclosed illness (implied to be AIDS). In a fitting end to their love story, Alan fulfills his book contract by writing a second book. This time, it is about his coming out process and his love affair with Tommy. The book is called The Trip, and is dedicated to Tommy.

== Cast ==
- Larry Sullivan as Alan Oakley
- Steve Braun as Tommy Ballenger
- Ray Baker as Peter Baxter
- James Handy as Hal
- Faith Salie as Ignored Woman
- Dennis Bailey as Larry Jenkins
- Alexis Arquette as Michael
- Sirena Irwin as Beverly
- Jill St. John as Mary Oakley
- Art Hindle as Ted Oakley
- Julie Brown as Receptionist
- David Mixner as himself
- Alfred Dennis as George Baxter

== Soundtrack ==
- "Bang a Gong (Get It On)" - T Rex
- "Ain't Nobody Straight in L.A." - The Miracles
- "Behind Closed Doors" - Charlie Rich
- "Shambala" - Three Dog Night
- "More, More, More" - The Andrea True Connection
- "Destination Unknown" - Missing Persons
- "Oh Sheila" - Ready for the World
- "A Horse with No Name" - America
- "Adoro" - Los Romanticos
- "Jump (For My Love)" - Pointer Sisters
- "Cover Me" - Bruce Springsteen

== Reception ==
On the review aggregator website Rotten Tomatoes, 38% of 32 critics' reviews are positive, with an average rating of 4.8/10. Metacritic, which uses a weighted average, assigned the film a score of 47 out of 100, based on 16 critics, indicating "mixed or average" reviews.
