= The Skulls III =

2004 film directed by J. Miles Dale

- Directed by: J. Miles Dale
- Written by: Joe Johnson
- Based on: The Skulls by John Pogue
- Produced by: Neal H. Moritz; John Pogue
- Starring: Clare Kramer; Bryce Johnson; Steve Braun; Barry Bostwick
- Cinematography: David A. Makin
- Edited by: Stephen Lawrence
- Music by: Christophe Beck; Mark Kilian
- Production company: Original Film
- Distributed by: Universal Studios Home Video
- Release date: March 23, 2004
- Running time: 102 minutes
- Country: United States
- Language: English

The Skulls III is a 2004 thriller film, directed by J. Miles Dale and starring Clare Kramer, Bryce Johnson, Steve Braun, and Barry Bostwick. It is a sequel to the 2002 film The Skulls II and the third and final installment of The Skulls film series. The film was released direct-to-video by Universal Studios Home Video on March 23, 2004.

== Cast ==
- Clare Kramer as Taylor Brooks
- Bryce Johnson as Roger Lloyd
- Barry Bostwick as Nathan Lloyd
- Steve Braun as Brian Kelly
- Karl Pruner as Martin Brooks
- Dean McDermott as Det. Staynor
- Maria del Mar as Det. Valdez
- Len Cariou as Dean Lawton
- Brooke D'Orsay as Veronica Bell
- Shaun Sipos as Ethan Rawlings
- Chris Trussell as Conrad
- David Purchase as Killebrew
- Toby Proctor as Sam Brooks
- Martha Burns as Swim Coach
- Alison Sealy-Smith as Dr. Franks
- Philip Akin as Captain Harlan
- John Bayliss as Minister
- Irene Dale as Librarian
- Jonathan Duncap as Priest

== Reception ==
=== Accolades ===
| Award | Date of ceremony | Category | Recipients | Result |
|---|---|---|---|---|
| DVD Exclusive Awards | 2005 | Best Supporting Actress (in a DVD Premiere Movie) | Brooke D'Orsay | Nominated |
| DVD Exclusive Awards | 2005 | Best Supporting Actor (in a DVD Premiere Movie) | Barry Bostwick | Nominated |
| DVD Exclusive Awards | 2005 | Best Cinematography (in a DVD Premiere Movie) | David A. Makin | Nominated |
| Golden Reel Awards | 2005 | Best Sound Editing in Direct to Video | Nelson Ferreira, Rob Bertola, Kevin Banks, Mike Welker | Nominated |
