= Roxanne McKee =

Canadian-born British actress (born 1980)

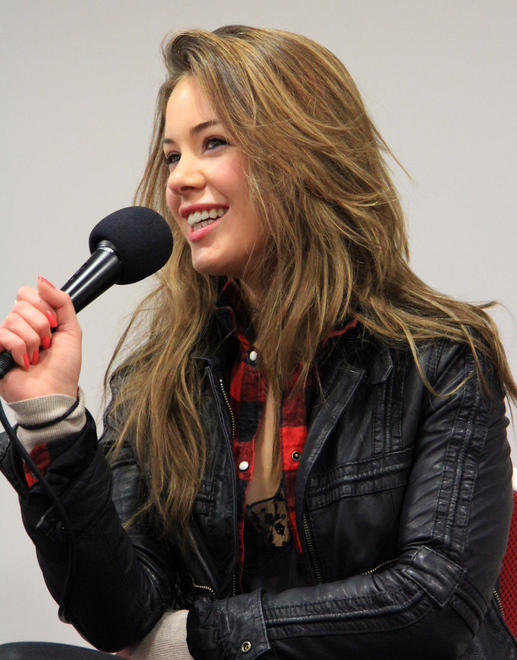
- McKee at Collectormania in 2012
- Born: 10 August 1980 (age 46); Canada
- Occupation: Actress
- Years active: 2005–present
- Children: 2

Roxanne McKee (born 10 August 1980) is a Canadian-born British actress. She is best known for playing Louise Summers in the Channel 4 soap opera Hollyoaks (2005–2008), Lou Foster in the BBC Three drama series Lip Service (2010), Doreah in the HBO fantasy drama series Game of Thrones (2011–2012) and Lady Claire Riesen in the Syfy apocalyptic supernatural series Dominion (2014–2015). She has also starred in films including Wrong Turn 5: Bloodlines (2012), Vendetta (2013) and The Legend of Hercules (2014).

== Early life and education ==
McKee was born in Canada to Irish parents, and has additional paternal Scottish ancestry. She went to school in Sussex. In 2005 she completed a BA degree in Social Policy & Political Studies at Royal Holloway, University of London in 2005. Before securing her first acting roles, McKee worked in various occupations, including as a waitress, a recruitment consultant and in Human resources. She did not attend drama school.

== Career ==
=== 2005–2008: Hollyoaks ===
McKee auditioned for the role of Hollyoaks character Louise Summers in 2004 as part of Hollyoaks: On the Pull, a nationwide search to find a new actor. After being chosen from over 35,000 applicants, McKee began portraying Louise, who was introduced by series producer David Hanson in 2005.

In 2008, McKee hinted at a possible exit for her character despite refuting claims that she wanted to leave. She told Look magazine: "I'm not going to be there forever. I don't mind the long hours but I'll have been doing that for four years in October when my contract ends." After her contract ended in October 2008, McKee decided to leave the show to focus on other projects, mainly theatre. Several months after her final on-screen appearance, tabloid newspapers began to speculate that McKee would reprise the role to coincide with the exit of Jamie Lomas's character, Warren. McKee had previously told Digital Spy: "Well, Louise might not be dead! That's the exciting twist in the future... On screen, you'll feel like she's dead but depending on me and whether I want to come back for an episode in March — I might be back. I filmed an extra scene showing that I'm still alive. There are flashbacks which show me being killed, but then there's a flashback which viewers won't see for a while, that will be used if I choose to come back for the episode. I kind of want to come back and finish off Louise's storyline, but at the moment, I might be doing something else. It would be really good, though — I'd be going back to kill a few people off."

Following McKee's decision to leave the show, she said: "I have enjoyed my time at Hollyoaks immensely and I'm going to really miss everyone at Lime Pictures. I have learned so much and will take away with me many happy memories — not just from everyone I have worked with but from Liverpool as a city too, which has become my second home. I know I will shed a few tears on the day I leave but I am so excited about what the future holds." Hollyoaks series producer Bryan Kirkwood commented on her departure, stating: "As well as being the nation's sexiest soap star for two years running, Roxanne has worked incredibly hard to prove herself as a talented actress. She has been at the centre of one of our biggest storylines for the past two years and her exit scenes will be a fitting climax. Roxanne is a real star in the making and I'm sure this won't be the last that we hear of her." McKee says she was asked to return to the role about a year after leaving the show, but she declined.

McKee won the award 'Sexiest Female' at The British Soap Awards in 2007 and 2008, an award she had been nominated for in 2006 and 2009. McKee was also won 'Sexiest Female' at the Inside Soap Awards in 2007 and 2008. In 2008 she was also nominated for 'Best Actress'. Virgin Media profiled some of Hollyoaks' "hottest females" in their opinion, of Louise they stated: "It's no surprise that sultry Roxanne McKee was voted sexiest soap star for two years running at the British Soap Awards. She's so foxy that even on-screen fiancé Warren was sad he had to finish her off."

=== 2008–2010: She's like a Star, Lip Service ===
Post-Hollyoaks, McKee said "that when you come out of a soap opera people see you in a different light and since Hollyoaks I have consciously tried to pick roles that are challenging and different".

In 2008, McKee appeared in the Taio Cruz music video for "She's like a Star", filmed in Spain. Cruz, who is good friends with McKee, personally asked her to appear in the video as his love interest. On casting McKee, Cruz said: "Why Roxanne? She's fit and I wanted her in my video! I'm only joking. I've known Roxanne for some time... We needed an actress who wouldn't feel awkward doing the mock love scenes so I just rang her and she agreed to do it. It was a case of canoodling for a few hours in sunny Spain". Most scenes in the video take place in a large house. Throughout the video, the pair are touching and kissing with each other, and McKee is shown in the bathtub. In the concluding scenes, she leaves the house and is depicted as a bright star that travels towards the sky, while Cruz stands in front of the house by the pool.

In July 2009, McKee became the face of Clothes Show Live, stating: "I've always watched it on TV and wanted to go, so I'm very flattered to be part of such a huge event". In 2010, she was cast in a small role in the on-line drama EastEnders: E20, playing bisexual character Pippa. She also appeared in Johannes Roberts' hooligan horror film F and BBC Two's sitcom The Persuasionists.

In 2010, McKee appeared in BBC Three's lesbian drama Lip Service, set in Glasgow. She played Lou Foster, a closeted television presenter from Northern Ireland who falls in love with Tess (Fiona Button). McKee was originally asked to audition for Frankie, Ruta Gedmintas's role. Regarding her performance, McKee stated that she wanted to make Lou more rounded and less one-dimensional: "She has her reasons for being the way she is and hopefully the audience can see that".

=== 2011–2015: Game of Thrones, Dominion ===
In 2010, George R. R. Martin announced that McKee had been cast as Doreah in Game of Thrones, the HBO fantasy drama series based on his best-selling novels. This is perhaps her best-known role. In January 2011, she expressed excitement for being a part of the show.

She’s bright, quick-witted, and she’s got an instinct to survive. And she knows that that’s a way to control people, with sexuality. People do it all the time. She uses her femininity and her sexuality because she doesn’t have anything else... I think she just had a survivor instinct in her.

— McKee, on her character Doreah

The series was filmed in Ireland and required her to learn horse riding. For her work in the series, she was nominated alongside her cast members for Outstanding Performance by an Ensemble in a Drama Series at the 18th Screen Actors Guild Awards. Doreah is initially a handmaiden to Daenerys Targaryen (Emilia Clarke) but eventually betrays Daenerys. She is last seen being imprisoned in season 2's Valar Morghulis. McKee stated in 2014 "there was talk of going back at some stage, but I think that will be knocked on the head now".

In 2012, McKee appeared in the horror sequel Wrong Turn 5: Bloodlines. She played Blanche de Vesci, a Crusader's daughter, in the historical war film Ironclad: Battle for Blood, and Queen Alcmene in The Legend of Hercules, both released in 2014.

From 2014 to 2015, McKee played Claire Riesen in the Syfy series Dominion. Her character is a socialite who develops a romance with the series' protagonist. McKee has noted the similarities between Claire and her previous role Doreah.

=== 2015–present: Subsequent roles ===
She played soldier Natalie Reynolds in the action television series Strike Back: Retribution.

In 2020, McKee played Amanda Eastman in Picture Perfect Royal Christmas and Eve in season 2 of the CW sci-fi show Pandora. In 2023 she appeared in The Admirer. In 2025, she appeared as Xana in the horror film Bambi: The Reckoning.

== Personal life ==
On her work, McKee said in 2015:

"I rarely watch the stuff I’m in. I don’t like it. The best thing to do is do it, and put your heart and soul into it, then go out and have a glass of wine. It’s just a job."

McKee rock climbs, and as of 2011 she co-owned a nightclub in Leeds.

In November 2025, McKee gave birth to twins.

== Filmography ==
=== Feature film ===
Year	Title	Role	Notes	Ref
2010	F	Nicky Wright		
2012	Wrong Turn 5: Bloodlines	Lita		
2013	Vendetta	Morgan Vickers		
2014	The Legend of Hercules	Queen Alcmene		
2014	Ironclad: Battle for Blood	Blanche		
2019	Inside Man: Most Wanted	Ariella Barash		
2020	Picture Perfect Royal Christmas	Amanda Eastman		
2023	The Admirer	Nancy Williams		
2025	Savage Flowers	Lucy		
2025	Bambi: The Reckoning	Xana		
TBA	The Experiment	Lincoln Jones	Post-production	

=== Short film ===
Year	Title	Role	Notes
2027	Dakota Stone 2.0	Unknown	Main cast

=== Television ===
Year	Title	Role	Notes	Ref
2005	Hollyoaks: No Going Back	Louise Summers	Main role	
2005–2008	Hollyoaks	Louise Summers	Main role, 278 episodes	
2010	The Persuasionists	Christine / Agency Worker	Episode: "Cockney Cheese", "The Handsomeness"	
2010	EastEnders: E20	Pippa	Episode #2.2	
2010	Lip Service	Lou Foster	4 episodes	
2012	Lewis	Briony Keagan	Episode: "Generation of Vipers"	
2011–2012	Game of Thrones	Doreah	Recurring role (seasons 1–2), 11 episodes	
2014	Alt	Suzy	Television film	
2014–2015	Dominion	Claire Riesen	Main role	
2016	Crossfire	Samantha "Sam" Harrison	Television film	
2017–2018	Strike Back: Retribution	Captain Natalie Reynolds	Main role (season 6)	
2019	Paris, Wine & Romance	Lacey	Television film	
2020	Pandora	Eve	Recurring role (season 2)	

=== Video games ===
Year	Title	Role	Notes	Ref
2025	The Run	Zanna	Main role	

== Awards and nominations ==
2006

- No. 91 in the FHM 100 Sexiest Women in the World.

2007

- Won at British Soap Awards in category of Sexiest Female for her role in Hollyoaks.
- Won at Inside Soap Award in category of Sexiest Female for her role in Hollyoaks.
- No. 42 in the FHM 100 Sexiest Women in the World.

2008

- Won at Digital Spy Soap Awards in the category of Sexiest Female for her role in Hollyoaks.
- No. 97 in the FHM 100 Sexiest Women in the World.
- Won at British Soap Awards in category of Sexiest Female for her role in Hollyoaks.

2012

- Nominated for Outstanding Performance by an Ensemble in a Drama Series at 18th Screen Actors Guild Awards
