= Declan O'Brien =

American writer and director (1965–2022)

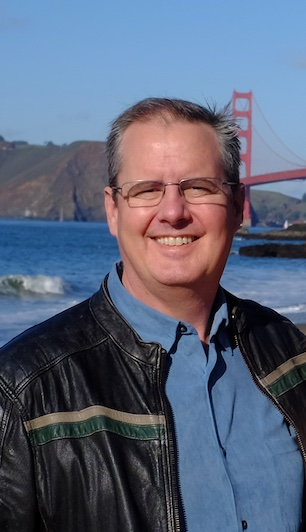
- O'Brien in 2015
- Born: Declan Timothy O'Brien; December 21, 1965; Rochester, New York, U.S.
- Died: February 16, 2022 (aged 56); Beverly Hills, California, U.S.
- Occupations: Film director, screenwriter, producer

Declan Timothy O'Brien (December 21, 1965 – February 16, 2022) was an American film and television writer and director. He directed of three films in the Wrong Turn series (2009–2012).

== Biography ==
His work with Syfy has also included writing for the film The Snake King, and he wrote the screenplay for The Harpy, which began pre-production on June 26, 2006. O'Brien directed the third, the fourth, and the fifth films of the Wrong Turn series, and wrote the latter two films. He directed Roger Corman's 2010 horror film Sharktopus.

He died on February 16, 2022, at the age of 56.

== Selected credits ==
- The Marine 4: Moving Target (2015) (characters)
- Joy Ride 3: Roadkill (2014) (director/writer)
- The Marine 3: Homefront (2013) (writer)
- Wrong Turn 5: Bloodlines (2012) (director/writer)
- Wrong Turn 4: Bloody Beginnings (2011) (director/writer)
- Sharktopus (2010) (director)
- Wrong Turn 3: Left for Dead (2009) (director)
- Rock Monster (2008) (director/writer)
- Genesis Code (2008) (director/writer)
- Cyclops (2008) (director)
- Alice Upside Down (2007) (producer/story)
- Pet Alien (2007) (writer)
- Creature Unknown (2004) (executive producer)
- On the 2nd Day of Christmas (1997) (co-producer)
