= Steve Braun (actor) =

Canadian actor

- Born: August 14, 1976 (age 50); Winnipeg, Manitoba, Canada
- Occupation: Actor

Steve Braun (born August 14, 1976) is a Canadian television and movie actor from Winnipeg, Manitoba.

== Career ==
Braun's credits include The Immortal, a TV show in which he and co-star Lorenzo Lamas hunted demons; The Trip, an independent film about coming of age in the HIV era; and Harold & Kumar Go to White Castle (2004), a major motion picture release in which he plays the leader of a group of obnoxious punks. He starred as Brian Kelly in the 2004 thriller The Skulls III. He also played the role of "Jonesy" in the 2007 thriller film Wrong Turn 2: Dead End. He also co-starred in the 2005 horror movie Pterodactyl as Willis Bradbury.

Braun was cast in a recurring guest role in The WB show Twins, as Jordan, the unrequited love interest of Mitchee Arnold, played by Sara Gilbert. The series, which debuted on September 16, 2005, was cancelled in May 2006.

== Filmography ==
=== Film ===
Year	Title	Role	Notes
1998	Hand	Dean	
2000	Scalpers	Joey	
2002	The Trip	Tommy Ballenger	
2004	The Skulls III	Brian Kelly	
2004	Harold & Kumar Go to White Castle	Cole	
2005	Pterodactyl	Willis Bradbury	
2006	Conversations with God	Clothing Store Manager	
2007	Wrong Turn 2: Dead End	Jonesy	
2008	Super Capers	Agent Guard	

=== Television ===
Year	Title	Role	Notes
1999	Relic Hunter	Young Jimmy	Episode: "Diamond in the Rough"
2000	Earth: Final Conflict	Volunteer Officer / Portal Engineer	2 episodes
2000–2001	The Immortal	Goodwin	22 episodes
2001	Dying to Dance	Scott	Television film
2002	Tornado Warning	Mark Scott	Television film
2002	Everybody's Doing It	Zack	Television film
2004	Family Sins	Jimmy Geck	Television film
2005	Tru Calling	Billy	Episode: "The Last Good Day"
2005	Twins	Jordan	5 episodes
2006	CSI: NY	Smith	Episode: "Charge of This Post"
2006	3 lbs	Otis Wills	Episode: "Lost for Words"
2006	Gilmore Girls	Tripp Kavanagh	Episode: "Introducing Lorelai Planetarium"
2007	Bones	Ashton Keller	Episode: "The Bodies in the Book"
2007	NCIS	Landon Grey	Episode: "Cover Story"
2007	The Closer	Greg Pierson	Episode: "Blindsided"
2008	CSI: Miami	Brad Gower	Episode: "Going Ballistic"
2008	The Mentalist	Sam Blakely	Episode: "The Thin Red Line"

=== Video games ===
Year	Title	Role
2010	Command & Conquer 4: Tiberian Twilight	Brother Mendel
2011	Killzone 3	ISA Soldiers
2011	Captain America: Super Soldier	Allied Forces / HYDRA
2013	Aliens: Colonial Marines	Marine
2014	Murdered: Soul Suspect	Officer Robinson
2015	Battlefield Hardline	Additional voices
