= Erica Leerhsen =

American actress (born 1976)

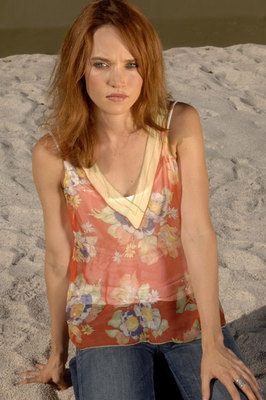
- Leerhsen at the 2005 screening of Little Athens
- Born: February 14, 1976 (age 50); New York City, U.S.
- Education: Boston University (BFA)
- Occupation: Actress
- Years active: 2000–present
- Known for: Book of Shadows: Blair Witch 2; The Texas Chainsaw Massacre; Wrong Turn 2: Dead End
- Spouses: Antony Galvan (m. 2007; div. 2008); David Wilson (m. 2012)

Erica Lei Leerhsen (born February 14, 1976) is an American actress. She first gained recognition for her leading part in the moderately successful horror sequel Book of Shadows: Blair Witch 2 (2000). Her work led her to take on a recurring role in the first season of The Guardian and star in the horror hit The Texas Chainsaw Massacre (2003). She has since appeared in numerous films of that genre, including Wrong Turn 2: Dead End (2007), Lonely Joe (2009) and The Butterfly Room (2012), and is considered a scream queen. She has also acted in the Woody Allen films Hollywood Ending (2002), Anything Else (2003) and Magic in the Moonlight (2014) as well as in Allen's play A Second-Hand Memory (2004).

== Early life ==
Leerhsen was born in New York City, and was raised in Ossining, Westchester County, New York, along with her two younger sisters, Debbie and Nora. Their father, Charles Leerhsen, is a longtime editor of celebrity publication Us Weekly. She attended St. Augustine's School and Ossining High School and attended the Boston University College of Fine Arts. While in college, Leerhsen performed in stage productions of The Call of the Wild and The Tempest. After graduating in 1998, she earned a BFA in acting the same year.

== Career ==
=== 2000s ===
Leerhsen made her film debut in the short film Junior Creative (2000), as Sarah, and shortly afterwards, she appeared in the horror sequel Book of Shadows: Blair Witch 2 (2000), though she originally auditioned for the part that eventually went to Kim Director. Upon its premiere, the sequel received extremely negative reviews by critics, but grossed US$26.4 million in North America, and went on to gross US$47.7 million globally. She was nominated for the Fangoria Chainsaw Award for her supporting role in that movie. Leerhsen's profile was raised significantly and her work in the film was followed by a number of appearances on television. In 2001, she guest-starred in an episode of the third season of The Sopranos, in which she played a lesbian tennis instructor who falls for Drea de Matteo's character, and became a member of the cast of the television series The Guardian, where she played Amanda Bowles, an ambitious but caring associate, who leaves midway through season one. She played a supporting role in Woody Allen's Hollywood Ending. Screened out of competition at the 2002 Cannes Film Festival. the film garnered a mixed critical response while it grossed a lukewarm US$14.5 million at the end of its theatrical run.

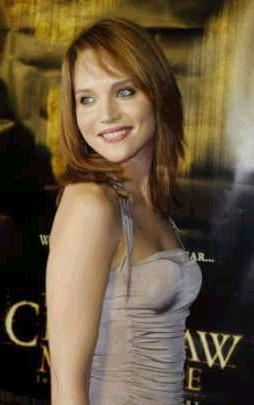
Leerhsen at the 2003 The Texas Chainsaw Massacre premiere

Leerhsen starred alongside Jessica Biel in the horror remake The Texas Chainsaw Massacre (2003), where she took on the role of one of the doomed teens. In a 2007 interview with website Icons of Fright, she admitted that in her audition for the movie, she screamed so loud that people on other floors of the building called the police to report that a woman was being attacked. Reviews for the film were mixed, but it was a box office success, scoring the number-one spot in its opening week and going on to earn more than $80 million in the U.S. Leerhsen became a prominent figure among horror films actors; Arrow in the Head honored her as the "Mistress of the Year 2003". Also in 2003, Leerhsen was a guest star in two episodes of the TV show Alias, and appeared in Woody Allen's romantic comedy film Anything Else, opposite Jason Biggs, Christina Ricci, Stockard Channing, Danny DeVito and Jimmy Fallon. She reunited with Allen in his play A Second-Hand Memory (2004), where she portrayed what was described by Variety as a "sweet secretary and superficial, nouveau-riche Hollywood wife".

Leerhsen starred opposite Michael Peña in the independent comedy drama film Little Athens (2005), which screened at the Toronto International Film Festival, and was released straight-to-DVD, to a mixed critical reception. While Variety remarked that Leerhsen and co-star Jill Ritchie were "stuck with narrowly conceived, deeply dislikable gals", she was praised by Mark Bell from Film Threat who, in his review, wrote that the actress "proves that the Blair Witch 2 was as much a blip in her acting skill as the film was in the pop culture conscienceness. Her interplay with Rachel Miner is true in the way that smalltown friendships really are: simple seemingly on the surface, but built on such complex webbing and history that every nuance, statement or situation is to be weighed and studied."

In 2006, Leerhsen made a guest appearance in the TV show Ghost Whisperer, and appeared as the female leading character Bronwin in the romantic comedy Mozart and the Whale, which was released in limited theaters. Leerhsen also guest appeared in a 2006 episode of the CBS crime drama series CSI: Miami. In the drama The Warrior Class, Leerhsen played the drug-addict wife of a mafia boss (Jake Webber). The film was filmed in 2004 but was released directly-to-DVD on February 6, 2007.

She headlined the horror sequel Wrong Turn 2: Dead End (2007), directed by Joe Lynch and co-starring Henry Rollins and Texas Battle. Unlike the 2003 film, the sequel premiered on DVD, but rated favorably with reviewers while it made US$9 million in domestic home video sales. DVD Talk critic David Walker found her to be a "stand out" and noted that she "puts a great spin on what could easily have been another tired retread of the scream queen character". Brian Collins of Bloody Disgusting stated that Leerhsen "continues to impress" and that she had "got chops far beyond what is required for this type of film". That year she was meant to star in another horror film — Shutter, opposite Joshua Jackson — portraying a character named Allison Carter, although ultimately she does not appear in the final production.

Leerhsen next had the lead role in the horror-thriller film Living Hell, where she played Carrie Freeborn, a hazmat specialist. The film, written and directed by Richard Jefferies, premiered on the SCI FI Channel on February 23, 2008, and was released on DVD under the title Organizm on June 10 in the United States. In 2009, the independent horror film Lonely Joe — in which Leerhsen starred — premiered in the festival circuit and was released for digital markets and selected theaters. Filming began on October 15, 2007, and wrapped on November 6, 2007. Leerhsen took on the role of Michele Connelly, a New York City reporter who returns to her hometown 10 years after the mysterious murder of her younger brother. Doing her own stunts for the film, she was nearly hit by the train when she lost her balance and lunged forward while shooting a sequence. Her scene was shot with her only 12 inches from the side of the train as it passed by at 30 miles per hour. Unshaken, she insisted on shooting the scene again.

=== 2010s ===
Leerhsen filmed a comedic short film entitled First Dates, exploring the dating scene of several single people. The production premiered at the AFI screening room in Los Angeles on January 8, 2011. She made one-episode appearances in The Good Wife in 2011 and in Person of Interest in 2012. She portrayed the next-door neighbor of a bipolar and butterfly-obsessed elderly lady (Barbara Steele) in The Butterfly Room, an Italian–American horror production, produced by Ethan Wiley and directed by Jonathan Zarantonello. The film premiered throughout the European film circuit in 2012, and was released in Italy on June 6, 2014, and in the US in one theater on April 11, 2014. Leerhsen starred in the low-budget horror The Message, which premiered at the 2012 Cape Fear Independent Film Festival and revolved around a young woman who is forced to come to terms with her personality flaws.

Leerhseen starred in the independent thriller Phobia, as Lesley Parker, a female doctor in the 19th century dedicated to help a group of people with their phobias who becomes embroiled in a murder mystery surrounding a patient that may be a vampire. The film was released on September 1, 2013. She played a supporting role in Mischief Night, a small-scale slasher released on October 30, 2013, for DVD and a limited theatrical run.

Leerhsen appeared in Woody Allen romantic comedy Magic in the Moonlight (2014) portraying the role of Caroline, a member of a rich American family in the 1920s French Riviera. The film, starring Emma Stone, Jacki Weaver, Colin Firth, and Marcia Gay Harden, received mixed reviews from critics, but was an arthouse success. Her work in the movie marked the fourth time Leerhsen has worked with Allen, who praised her for her acting abilities; "Every time I cast her, she comes through without fail. She shows up, she asks no questions, she does the character — I have no idea how she has worked it out — and it’s always effective".

== Personal life ==
In February 2007, she married professional cyclist Antony Galvan, but the couple divorced in 2008. As of 2014, she lives in Los Angeles, California with her husband Davis Wilson, whom she married on June 29, 2012. Besides acting, Leerhsen enjoys yoga, running, and playing basketball.

== Filmography ==
=== Film ===
Year	Title	Role	Notes
2000	Junior Creative	Sarah	Short film
2000	Book of Shadows: Blair Witch 2	Erica Geerson	
2002	Hollywood Ending	Actress	
2003	Anything Else	Connie	
2003	The Texas Chainsaw Massacre	Pepper Harrington	
2005	Little Athens	Heather	
2005	Mozart and the Whale	Bronwin	
2007	The Warrior Class	Annie Sullivan	
2007	Wrong Turn 2: Dead End	Nina Papas	
2009	Lonely Joe / Haunted Traxxs	Michele Connelly	
2010	First Dates	Clara	
2012	The Butterfly Room	Claudia	
2012	The Message	Anna	
2013	Phobia	Dr. Lesley Parker	
2013	Mischief Night	Kim	
2014	Pacific Standard	Carla	Short film; also producer
2014	Magic in the Moonlight	Caroline	
2015	Dominion	—N/a	Co-executive producer

=== Television ===
Year	Title	Role	Notes
2001	The Sopranos	Birgit Olafsdottir	Episode: "Mr. Ruggerio's Neighborhood"
2001–2002	The Guardian	Amanda Bowles	13 episodes
2003	Alias	Kaya	Episode: "Conscious"
2005	Ghost Whisperer	Hope Paulson	Episode: "Hope and Mercy"
2006	CSI: Miami	Brenda Sanders	Episode: "The Score"
2008	Living Hell	Carrie Freeborn	Television film
2011	The Good Wife	Dana Briglio	Episode: "Getting Off"
2012	Person of Interest	Amy	Episode: "Critical"
