= Aqueela Zoll =

American actress

- Born: December 17, 1988 (age 37); Redding, California, U.S.
- Occupation: Actress
- Years active: 2009–present
- Spouse: Ryan Gunnarson
- Children: 2

Aqueela Zoll (born December 17, 1988) is an American actress and former beauty pageant contestant. She is best known for playing Rachel in the comedy drama series Filthy Rich and for coming third runner up in the 2012 Miss California beauty pageant.

== Early life ==
Zoll was born on December 17, 1988 in Redding, California. She attended Shasta High School where she studied cosmetology. After graduating in 2007 she got her cosmetology license just two weeks later. She moved to Long Beach to attend a nursing school. She soon decided nursing wasn't for her after listening to her sisters advice. Unsure what to do her roommate asked her to help with an adertising portfolio which led to her purse an acting career.

== Career ==
Zoll competed in the 2012 edition of Miss California. She played Toni in the German horror film Wrong Turn 6: Last Resort. Her first big role came playing Kirsten in the sports comedy drama film Fighting with My Family starring Florence Pugh. Her biggest role so far has been playing Rachel in the comedy drama series Filthy Rich

== Personal life ==
She is of Cherokee descent on her mothers side while her dad is of Dutch-Indonesian descent. She is married to stuntman Ryan Gunnarson. In April 2022 she gave birth to a daughter named Rozlo. In November 2024, they welcomed their second child, a boy.

== Filmography ==
=== Film ===
Year	Title	Role	Notes
2011	Tomorrow's End	Beth	
2012	Killjoy Goes to Hell	Jezabeth	
2012	Call to Action	Dinopus	Short
2012	Flower	Sister Catherine	Short
2012	Crossed	Sara Rendrickson	
2013	Ctadc	Aqueela	Short
2013	Coherence	Extra	
2014	Fried: The Autobiography of Louie B. Mayer	The President	
2014	Bad Timing: The Series	Eve	
2014	Crazy Charlie	Charlie	Short
2014	Wrong Turn 6: Last Resort	Toni	
2014	The Interview	Reporter	Short
2014	Los Lost Ones	Tina	Short
2015	Darkstar	Skye	Short
2015	Hansel vs. Gretel	Willy	
2015	Flight World War II	Cameron Hicks	
2015	Axiom	Nika	Short
2015	From Here	Summer	Short
2015	Diary of a Psychopath	Patty	
2015	American Dream	Drusilla	
2016	Zinfandel	Caroline Beasley	Short
2017	Dances with Werewolves	Cassie	
2017	Slamma Jamma	Linda Collins	
2017	Dirty Lies	Catherine Campbell	
2017	Kinesthesia	Minny	Short
2019	Fighting with My Family	Kirsten	
2020	The F**k-It List	Natalie Legere	
2022	Dog	Callan	
2023	An Electric Sleep	Lead Soldier	

=== Television ===
Year	Title	Role	Notes
2009	The CollegeHumor Show	Kate	Episode; Hot Girl
2014	Chosen	Candice	5 episodes
2014	CollegeHumor Originals	Woman in Bikini	2 episodes
2016	Rush: Inspired by Battlefield	Savannah Avery	10 episodes
2022	Bad Timing	Eve	22 episodes
2020	Filthy Rich	Rachel	10 episodes
2024	Palm Royale	Princess Stephanie	2 episodes
