= Wrong Turn 4: Bloody Beginnings =

2011 film by Declan O'Brien

- Teaser poster
- Directed by: Declan O'Brien
- Written by: Declan O'Brien
- Based on: Characters by Alan B. McElroy
- Produced by: Kim Todd
- Starring: Jenny Pudavick; Tenika Davis; Kaitlyn Wong; Terra Vnesa
- Cinematography: Michael Marshall
- Edited by: Stein Myhrstad
- Music by: Claude Foisy
- Production companies: Constantin Film; Summit Entertainment
- Distributed by: 20th Century Fox Home Entertainment
- Release date: October 25, 2011
- Running time: 93 minutes
- Countries: Germany; United States; Canada
- Language: English
- Budget: $2 million

Wrong Turn 4: Bloody Beginnings is a 2011 slasher film written and directed by Declan O'Brien. It is the fourth installment of the Wrong Turn film series and served as the first part of a prequel to the Wrong Turn (2003). Starring Jennifer Pudavick, Tenika Davis, Kaitlyn Wong, and Terra Vnesa, the film follows a group of college students who get lost in a storm during a snowmobile trip and take shelter in an abandoned sanatorium that, unbeknownst to them, is home to deformed cannibals.

Wrong Turn 4: Bloody Beginnings was released to home media on October 25, 2011, by 20th Century Fox Home Entertainment. The film was not well-received by critics, but grossed $3.6 million in home sales. It was followed by Wrong Turn 5: Bloodlines (2012).

== Plot ==
In 1974, at the Glenville Sanatorium in West Virginia, head doctor Dr. Brendan Ryan gives Dr. Anne Marie McQuiad a tour around the building, entering Cell Ward C, where he introduces her to the young Hillicker brothers, Saw Tooth, One Eye, and Three Finger. After the doctors leave, the brothers use a hair pin to escape from their cell and brutally murder a guard before releasing the other patients. Together, they cause a riot, brutally murdering the orderlies and doctors, including Dr. McQuiad and Dr. Ryan.

29 years later, in 2003, nine Weston University students – Kenia, Jenna, Vincent, Sara, Bridget, Kyle, Claire, Daniel, and Lauren – spend their winter break snowmobiling to their friend Porter's cabin in the mountains. Lost in a snowstorm, they take shelter in the Glenville Sanatorium, not knowing the Hillickers live there as well. Lauren shares stories about the sanatorium and the cannibals, but her friends brush them off. As the rest goes to bed, Vincent explores the asylum and finds Porter's corpse before Saw Tooth kills him with a metal spike.

The next day, the teens remain trapped by the storm, notice Vincent missing and search the entire building for him. In the kitchen, Jenna comes across the Hillickers butchering Porter's body and runs back to warn the others. After Porter's severed head is thrown at the group, Claire is hanged from a balcony with barbed wire and decapitated. The group attempts to flee the building, but their snowmobile's spark plug wires have been stolen by the Hillickers. Lauren skis down the mountain to seek help while the others stay behind and barricade themselves in the doctor's office.

Kyle, Daniel, and Sara go into the basement to get weapons, but Daniel gets abducted, tied to a table in the kitchen, and slowly butchered and eaten alive. The rest of the group chases the cannibals and locks them in a cell. While Kyle stays behind to watch the brothers, the rest search for the spark-plug wires. When Kyle falls asleep, the brothers escape their cell, and the girls accidentally stab Kyle to death after mistaking him for one of the Hillickers. The brothers chase the girls through the building, forcing them to exit through a window, but Jenna is killed before she can escape. The remaining girls are ambushed by the cannibals who use the group's snowmobiles to chase them outside, where Kenia gets injured, and One Eye kills Bridget.

As the day dawns, Lauren has frozen to death, not far from a highway. Kenia is still being chased by One Eye when Sara reappears and knocks the cannibal off the snowmobile, allowing the pair to steal it and escape. They drive into a razor-wire trap set up by the cannibals, which decapitates them. Three Finger picks up their heads and puts them in their tow truck before leaving with his brothers.

== Cast ==
- Jenny Pudavick as Kenia Perrin
- Tenika Davis as Sara Washington
- Kaitlyn Wong as Bridget Manalo
- Terra Vnesa as Jenna Rivers
- Ali Tataryn as Lauren Perry
- Victor Zinck Jr. as Kyle Turner
- Dean Armstrong as Daniel Mullins
- Samantha Kendrick as Claire Kendrick
- Sean Skene as Three Finger and Vincent
- Scott Johnson as Saw Tooth and Orderly
- Daniel Skene as One Eye
- Dave Harms as Porter
- Arne MacPherson as Dr. Brendan Ryan
- Kristen Harris as Dr. Ann Marie McQuaid
- Blane Cypurda as Young Three Finger
- Bryan Verot as Young Saw Tooth
- Tristan Carlucci as Young One Eye

== Home media ==
Wrong Turn 4: Bloody Beginnings was released to DVD and Blu-ray on October 25, 2011. To date, the film earned $3.6 million.

== Reception ==
On review aggregation website Rotten Tomatoes, it has a rating of 67% of based on reviews from seven critics, with an average rating of 5.3/10. Steve Barton of Dread Central rated it 2.5 out of 5 and called it "the Congo of slasher movies", an objectively bad film that is still enjoyable to watch. Anton Bitel of Little White Lies wrote that although the film delivers what fans want, the characters are interchangeable and the plot is derivative. William Bibbiani of CraveOnline rated it 7.5 out of 10 and wrote, "Wrong Turn 4 is the kind of movie that knows exactly what it is and offers nothing less, and occasionally a little more." Charles Webb of Twitch Film wrote, "There's not much to recommend the latest entry in this franchise, which, like all long-running horror series has already reached its point of diminishing returns."

== Sequel ==
A sequel titled Wrong Turn 5: Bloodlines, was released in 2012.
