= Sadie Katz =

American actress and writer (born 1978)

- Born: Sadie Lorraine Jones; October 13, 1978 (age 48); Los Angeles, California, U.S.
- Other names: Buffy Green, Sadi Catz
- Occupation: Actress
- Years active: 2005–present

Sadie Katz (born October 13, 1978 as Sadie Lorraine Jones) is an American actress, WGA writer, director, and producer from Los Angeles, California.

== Career ==
Katz is best known for playing Sally in Wrong Turn 6: Last Resort. Due to her acting credits and the types of films she has starred in (which include Party Bus to Hell, Blood Feast, House of Bad, Dread Central, and Shock Till You Drop), she is considered to be a scream queen.

She wrote the script for Scorned, which was loosely inspired by a breakup in her own life. She is also known for the documentary The Bill Murray Experience, of which she wrote, directed, produced, and starred in. Katz is a festival and an indie actress who has co-starred alongside June Squibb, Tara Reid, Billy Zane, and Danny Trejo.

== Filmography ==
=== Film ===
Year	Title	Role	Notes
2005	A Lot to Ask	Wendy	Short
2006	Room for Error	-	Short
2007	Ben David: Broken Sky	Wife	
2009	The Last Big Blowout	-	Short
2009	Good Guys Finish Last	Mary	
2009	Redux	Clara Wallace	Short
2011	T Is for Truth	Lisa	Short
2011	Hit List	Blonde Woman #1	
2012	Nipples & Palm Trees	Harmony	
2012	Birthday Sex	Kristen	TV movie
2012	Ordinary Man	Annie	Short
2013	Hidden Treasures	Cat	
2013	House of Bad	Sirah	
2013	Chavez Cage of Glory	Gia Chavez	
2013	All American Christmas Caro	Music Video Girl	
2013	Scorned	Waitress	
2014	Under the Hollywood Sign	Alexis	
2014	Wrong Turn 6: Last Resort	Sally	Video
2014	Crystal Skulls	Al Jazeara Reporter Sheila West	TV movie
2015	Only God Can	Coley's Mom	
2016	Grindsploitation	Allie	
2016	Blood Feast	The Goddess Ishtar	
2016	The Visit	Anna	Short
2016	The Night Shift	Carrie	
2017	Party Bus to Hell	Joan Starrett	
2017	Pinata	Co-Worker	Short
2018	Ego	-	Short
2019	Automation	Susan	
2019	Mayday	Aeryn	
2019	Hanukkah	Rachel	
2020	Hacksaw	DJ Cassidy (voice)	
2020	Clown Fear	Carlee Summers	
2020	Megan	Megan	
2020	The Step Daddy	Valerie	
2020	The Amityville Harvest	Christina	
2020	13 Slays Till X-Mas	Dr. Hershberger	
2021	Angel City Horror	Wynn	Short
2022	Kali	Emma	Short
2022	8 Days to Hell	Cindy	
2022	Killer Connection	Celeste	
2022	Night of the Zomghouls	Madison	
2022	Mike & Fred vs The Dead	Radio DJ (voice)	
2022	Unreported	Lisa	
2022	Space Wars: Quest for the Deepstar	Elnora	
2022	Shelter	President	
2023	Reverence	McKenzie (Kilah's Mom)	Short
2023	End Times	Deirdre	
2023	End Times (II)	Deirdre	
2023	Static Codes	Nyla	
2023	Transmission	Clara	
2023	Death Club	Lisa	
2023	Woods Witch	Melora	
2023	The Truth About Monsters	Madeline Hush	

=== Television ===
Year	Title	Role	Notes
2013	7 Lives Xposed	Gina	Episode: "It's Complicated"
2015	Diabolical Women	Dana Sue Gray	Episode: "Dana Sue Gray"
2015	My Haunted House	Deanna Simpson	Episode: "The Haunting of Deanna Simpson"
2015	Wolf/Man	Kim	Episode: "Homecoming King"

=== Music video ===
Year	Song	Artist	Role
2019	"The Devil You Know"	L.A. Guns	Beth
