= Valeri Milev =

Bulgarian film director

- Born: 3 November 1974 (age 51); Sofia, Bulgaria
- Occupation: Film director
- Years active: 2005–present
- Known for: Bullets of Justice; Re-Kill

Valeri Milev (Bulgarian: Валери Милев; born 3 November 1974) is a Bulgarian commercial, music video, and movie director from Sofia. His most notable works are the movies Bullets of Justice and Re-Kill.

== Biography ==
Milev attended New Bulgarian University, and graduated in 1999, majoring in Cinema and TV directing. Milev has directed over 200 music videos and 150 TV commercials. His first movie as director was released in 2009, "Re-Kill".

== Filmography ==
Movie	Year	Role
Re-Kill	2011	Director
Code Red	2013	Director, screenwriter
Wrong Turn 6: Last Resort	2014	Director
After Dark Originals: Re-kill	2015	Director
Bullets of Justice	2017	Director
Kill 'Em All 2	2024	Director
