= Chris Jarvis (actor) =

British actor

- Born: Poole, Dorset, England
- Occupation(s): Actor, dancer
- Years active: 2004–present
- Known for: PC Dan Casper in The Bill (2005–2007)

Chris Jarvis is an English dancer and actor. Jarvis played PC Dan Casper in the ITV soap opera The Bill, appearing in the show from February 2005 to August 2007.

Jarvis appeared in the 2004 film version of The Phantom of the Opera. He had a part in the film Beyond The Sea, and played the part of Jackson in the 20th Century Fox horror film Wrong Turn 6: Last Resort. He appeared as Eddie in the 2008 feature film Mamma Mia!.

He ran the London Marathon in 2007.
