= Christopher Drake =

American composer

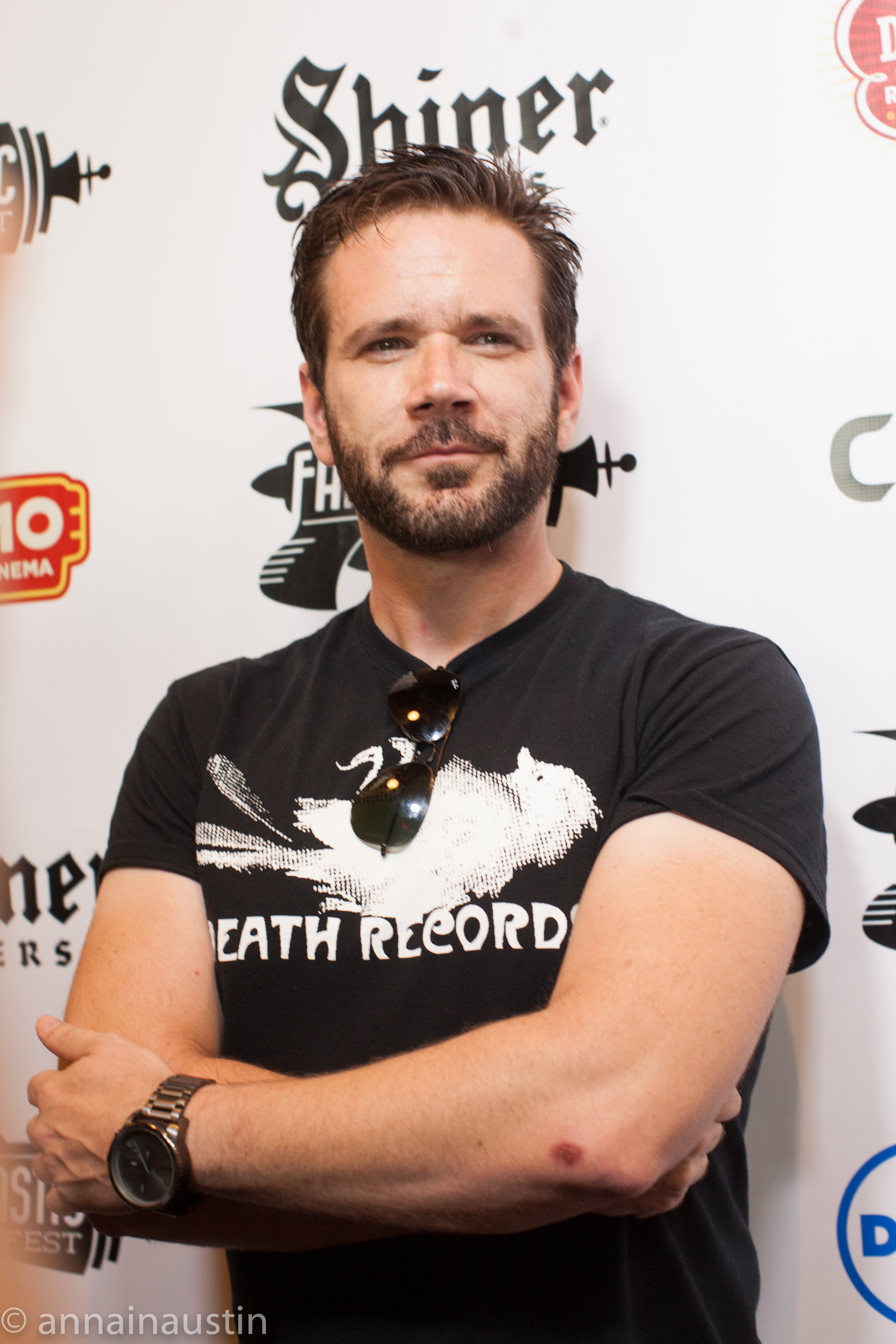

Background information
- Occupation: composer

Christopher Drake is an American film, television and video game composer. He has composed music for several DC Comics projects, including the animated films Batman: Under the Red Hood, Batman: Year One, and Batman: The Dark Knight Returns, as well as the video games Injustice: Gods Among Us and Batman: Arkham Origins.

According to Drake, he first broke into the music business in 2002, when director Guillermo del Toro heard some music that Drake had composed for props collector Bob Burns. He collaborated with del Toro to re-score the director's unfinished 1987 short film Geometria for a 2010 release.

== Discography ==
=== Film ===
| Year | Title | Director | Studio(s) | Notes |
|---|---|---|---|---|
| 1987 | Geometria | Guillermo del Toro | —N/a | —N/a |
| 2003 | Passing Through | Bruce Coughran | —N/a | —N/a |
| 2005 | Plan B | Morgan Mead | —N/a | —N/a |
| 2006 | Fra gli amici | Jason Hallows | —N/a | —N/a |
| 2006 | Hellboy: Sword of Storms | Phil Weinstein; Tad Stones | Film Roman; Madhouse | —N/a |
| 2007 | Hellboy: Blood and Iron | Mike Mignola; Tad Stones | Film Roman; Madhouse | —N/a |
| 2008 | Singularity | Jason Hallows | —N/a | —N/a |
| 2008 | Batman: Gotham Knight | Shoujirou Nishimi; Yasuhiro Aoki | Warner Bros. Animation; Warner Premiere | Segments: Have I Got a Story for You and In Darkness Dwells |
| 2009 | The Fisherman | Jason Hallows | —N/a | —N/a |
| 2009 | Wonder Woman | Lauren Montgomery | Warner Bros. Animation; Warner Premiere | —N/a |
| 2009 | Superman/Batman: Public Enemies | Sam Liu | Warner Bros. Animation; Warner Premiere | —N/a |
| 2009 | Bob Burns' Hollywood Halloween | Lindsey Keith Jackson | —N/a | —N/a |
| 2010 | Justice League: Crisis on Two Earths | Sam Liu; Lauren Montgomery | Warner Bros. Animation; Warner Premiere | —N/a |
| 2010 | Batman: Under the Red Hood | Brandon Vietti | Warner Bros. Animation; Warner Premiere | —N/a |
| 2011 | All-Star Superman | Sam Liu | Warner Bros. Animation; Warner Premiere | —N/a |
| 2011 | Green Lantern: Emerald Knights | Christopher Berkeley; Lauren Montgomery; Jay Oliva | Warner Bros. Animation; Warner Premiere | —N/a |
| 2011 | Batman: Year One | Sam Liu; Lauren Montgomery | Warner Bros. Animation; Warner Premiere | —N/a |
| 2011 | DC Showcase: Catwoman | Lauren Montgomery | Warner Bros. Animation; Warner Premiere | —N/a |
| 2012 | Justice League: Doom | Lauren Montgomery | Warner Bros. Animation; Warner Premiere | —N/a |
| 2012–13 | Batman: The Dark Knight Returns | Jay Oliva | Warner Bros. Animation; Warner Premiere | —N/a |
| 2014 | Batman: Strange Days | Bruce Timm | Warner Bros. Animation | —N/a |
| 2014 | Tusk | Kevin Smith | A24 | —N/a |
| 2015 | Harbinger Down | Alec Gillis | Amalgamated Dynamics; Dark Dunes Productions | —N/a |
| 2015 | Tales of Halloween | Dave Parker; Ryan Schifrin | Epic Pictures Group | Segments: "Sweet Tooth" and "The Ransom of Rusty Rex" |
| 2016 | Yoga Hosers | Kevin Smith | Invincible Pictures | —N/a |
| 2016 | Holidays | Kevin Smith | Vertical Entertainment | Segment "Halloween" |
| 2020 | The Reckoning | Neil Marshall | TBA | —N/a |
| 2021 | The Manor | Axelle Carolyn | Amazon Studios | —N/a |
| 2022 | The Lair | Neil Marshall | TBA | —N/a |

=== Video games ===
| Year | Title | Studio(s) | Notes |
|---|---|---|---|
| 2008 | Hellboy: The Science of Evil | Krome Studios; Konami | —N/a |
| 2013 | Injustice: Gods Among Us | NetherRealm Studios; Warner Bros. Interactive Entertainment | —N/a |
| 2013 | Batman: Arkham Origins Blackgate | Armature Studio; Warner Bros. Interactive Entertainment | —N/a |
| 2013 | Batman: Arkham Origins | WB Games Montréal; Warner Bros. Interactive Entertainment | —N/a |
| 2017 | Injustice 2 | NetherRealm Studios; Warner Bros. Interactive Entertainment | —N/a |
