= Sean Pertwee =

English actor (born 1964)

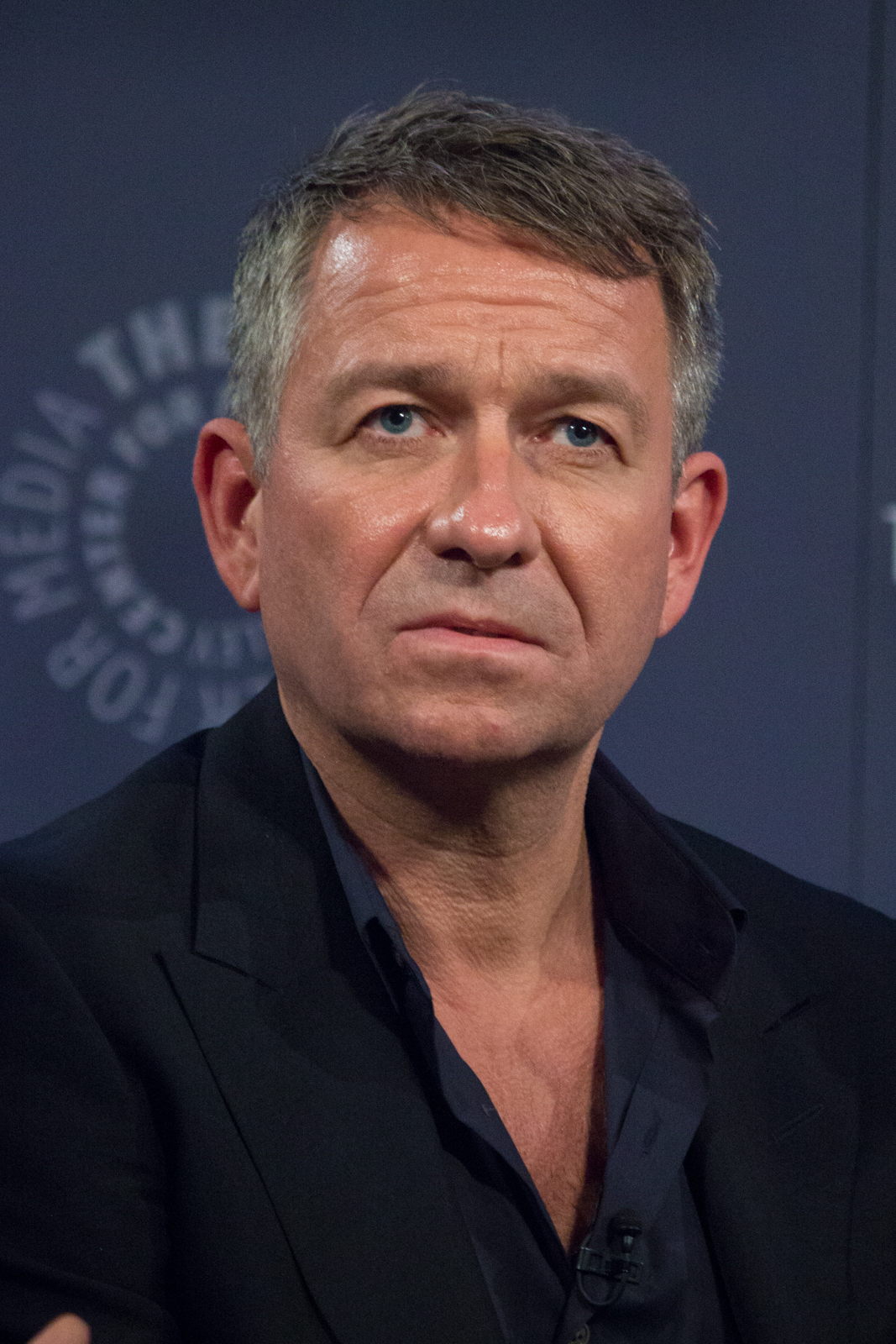
- Pertwee in 2014
- Born: Sean Carl Roland Pertwee; 4 June 1964 (age 62); Hammersmith, London, England
- Education: Bristol Old Vic Theatre School
- Occupations: Actor; narrator; producer
- Years active: 1975–present
- Known for: Captain Fitzpatrick (Tom Jones); Sergeant Wells (Dog Soldiers); Alfred Pennyworth (Gotham)
- Spouse: Jacqueline Hamilton-Smith (m. 1999)
- Children: 2 (1 deceased)
- Father: Jon Pertwee
- Relatives: Roland Pertwee (grandfather); Michael Pertwee (uncle)

Sean Carl Roland Pertwee (born 4 June 1964) is an English actor and producer. His credits include Chancer (1990), Leon the Pig Farmer (1992), Cadfael (1994), Bodyguards, Event Horizon (both 1997), Stiff Upper Lips, Soldier (both 1998), Cleopatra (1999), Love, Honour and Obey (2000), Dog Soldiers (2002), Julius Caesar (2003), Ancient Rome: The Rise And Fall of an Empire – Caesar (2006), Doomsday, Honest (both 2008), Devil's Playground (2010), Four, Wild Bill (both 2011), Elementary (2013–2014), Howl (2015), Gotham (2014–2019), Agatha Christie's The Pale Horse (2020), You (2023), Silent Witness (2024), and The Night Caller (2024).

== Early life ==
Sean Carl Roland Pertwee was born in Hammersmith, London, on 4 June 1964, to English actor Jon Pertwee and his German second wife, Ingeborg Rhoesa. His older sister is actress and psychotherapist Dariel Pertwee. Many of Pertwee's extended family were involved in show business; his paternal grandfather Roland Pertwee and uncle Michael Pertwee were playwrights, and actor Bill Pertwee was his third cousin. Sean Pertwee is of German and French Huguenot heritage.

He was educated at Teddington Boys' School in Richmond upon Thames, and then at Sunbury College, Surrey. He later studied acting at Bristol Old Vic Theatre School, graduating in 1986.

== Career ==
=== Theatre ===
Pertwee joined the Royal Shakespeare Company and toured with them for three years. During this time, he appeared in Titus Andronicus at the Swan Theatre, Stratford-upon-Avon (1987), and The New Inn at the People's Theatre, Newcastle upon Tyne (1988).

=== TV and film ===
He appeared in Agatha Christie's Hercule Poirot – The King of Clubs alongside David Suchet (12 March 1989). In 1992, he starred as Keith Chadwick in Leon the Pig Farmer.

In 1994, he appeared as Hugh Beringar alongside Derek Jacobi in the first series of the television series Cadfael. In 1997, he starred alongside Laurence Fishburne, Sam Neill, Joely Richardson, and Jason Isaacs in the space based science fiction horror film Event Horizon (1997). In 1998, he starred alongside Kurt Russell in the science fiction action film Soldier (1998).

In 1999 he portrayed Brutus in the Hallmark Channel film Cleopatra. He co-owned the Natural Nylon film production company along with Sadie Frost, Jude Law, Jonny Lee Miller, and Ewan McGregor. and starred alongside them in Love, Honour and Obey (2000). Pertwee became known for his portrayal of grimacing death, particularly in the Neil Marshall Werewolf film Dog Soldiers (2002), a skill which led to him being awarded 'Best Death Face' at Bristol Old Vic.

He appeared in the film Devil's Playground (2010), a horror film directed by Mark McQueen, starring alongside Danny Dyer, Jaime Murray, and Craig Fairbrass. Pertwee appeared in the Nazi zombie film The 4th Reich which he filmed in 2010, directed by Shaun Smith.

In 2014, he was cast in Fox's TV series Gotham, a series presenting an origin for the characters of the Batman franchise. Pertwee portrays Alfred Pennyworth, an ex-special forces soldier from London who works as the Wayne family's loyal butler. After Thomas and Martha Wayne are murdered, he becomes guardian and mentor to the future Batman.

In 2024, he played Detective Inspector John Flynn in Silent Witness in the episodes "Death by a Thousand Hits" Part 1 and 2. He played a late night disc jockey in Channel 5's four part mini-series The Night Caller, broadcast in 2024.

=== Voice ===
He appeared in the 2008 film Doomsday as Doctor Talbot. His voice is frequently heard in a variety of television commercials, documentaries and video games, including the medieval empire-building computer game Medieval: Total War and futuristic war games Killzone (as Colonel Gregor Hakha), Killzone 2 (as Colonel Mael Radec), and Fire Warrior (as Governor Severus). He is also the voice behind the Northeast's tourism advertisement which started broadcasting at the start of 2009. He replaced India Fisher from the fourth series onwards, as the narrator of Masterchef: The Professionals. He starred alongside John Hurt as Brother Proteus in the animated film Ultramarines: The Movie (2010) a Warhammer 40,000 Movie.

Pertwee has been in several dramatic works for BBC Radio 4, including playing the actor Oliver Reed in the play Burning Both Ends by Matthew Broughton in 2011.

== Personal life ==
Pertwee married Jacqueline Jane "Jacqui" Hamilton-Smith, a make-up artist, daughter of Anthony Hamilton-Smith, on 12 June 1999 at the House of Lords. His wife gave birth to twins, in 2001. They were born prematurely; one died four days later.

== Politics ==
Pertwee presented a television party political broadcast on behalf of the Labour Party in the 2010 UK general election.

== Filmography ==
=== Film ===
Year	Title	Role	Notes/Refs.
1991	Coping with Cupid	Peter	Short
1992	Leon the Pig Farmer	Keith Chadwick	
1993	Dirty Weekend	The Quiet One	
1993	Swing Kids		Uncredited
1994	Shopping	Tommy	
1995	Blue Juice	J.C.	
1995	ID	Martin	
1997	Event Horizon	Pilot Smith	
1998	Soldier	Mace	
1998	Tale of the Mummy	Bradley Cortese	
1998	Stiff Upper Lips	George	
1999	Cleopatra	Brutus	
2000	Five Seconds to Spare	Piers	
2000	Love, Honour and Obey	Sean	
2000	Seven Days to Live	Martin Shaw	
2001	The 51st State	Detective Virgil Kane	
2002	Equilibrium	Father	
2002	Dog Soldiers	Sergeant Harry G. Wells	
2005	Goal!	Barry Rankin	
2005	The Adventures of Greyfriars Bobby	Duncan Smithie	
2005	The Prophecy: Uprising	Dani Simionescu	
2005	The Last Drop	Sgt Bill McMillan	
2006	Renaissance	Montoya	
2006	Wilderness	Jed	
2007	Dangerous Parking	Ray Molina	
2007	Goal! 2: Living the Dream...	Barry Rankin	
2007	Botched	Mr. Groznyi	
2008	Doomsday	Dr. Talbot	
2008	Mutant Chronicles	Nathan Rooker	
2010	4.3.2.1.	Mr. Richards	
2010	Just for the Record	Sensei	
2010	Ultramarines: The Movie	Brother Proteus	
2010	Devil's Playground	Rob	
2011	Four	Detective	
2011	Wild Bill	Jack	
2012	The Seasoning House	Goran	
2012	Naked Harbour	Robert	
2012	St George's Day	Proctor	
2013	UFO	Tramp	
2013	The Magnificent Eleven	Pete	
2013	Alan Partridge: Alpha Papa	SFO Steve Stubbs	
2015	Howl	Train Driver Tony	
2020	The Reckoning	Moorcroft	
2022	The Invitation	Mr. Fields	
2024	Duchess	Danny Oswald	

=== Television ===
Year	Title	Role	Notes/Refs.
1989	Poirot: The King of Clubs	Ronnie Oglander	
1989	Casualty	Nick	"Chain Reaction"
1989	Hard Cases	Dominic Lutovski	7 episodes
1990	Chancer	Jamie Douglas	Recurring – 8 episodes
1990	Cluedo	Richard Forrest	Episode: "Christmas Past, Christmas Present"
1991	The Chief	Det. Sgt. Kevin Powers	"Episode 2"
1991	Clarissa	John Belford	4 episodes
1992	Virtual Murder	Matt Andries	Episode: "Dreams Imagic"
1992	The Young Indiana Jones Chronicles	Captain Heinz	Episode: "Trenches of Hell, Part 2"
1992	Boon	David Kennedy	Episode: "Whispering Grass"
1992	The Ruth Rendell Mysteries	Det Sgt Barry Vine	4 episodes
1992	A Touch of Frost	Dazza Scott	S3 Episode 2: "Quarry"
1993	Peak Practice	Francis Barrat	Episode: "Hope to Die"
1994	Cadfael	Sheriff Hugh Beringar	Series 1
1996	Deadly Voyage	Ion Plesin	TV film directed by John Mackenzie and written by Stuart Urban
1997	Bodyguards	Ian Worell	Main cast
1998	Macbeth	Macbeth	UK TV
2000	Operation Good Guys	The Leader	Episode: "The Leader"
2000	In the Beginning	Isaac	Two-part biblical TV Mini-series directed by Kevin Connor
2001	Cold Feet (2001)	Mark Cubitt	Guest star; Series 4 – 4 episodes
2003	Cold Feet (2003)	Mark Cubitt	Guest star; Series 5 – 2 episodes
2003	Waking The Dead	Carl Mackenzie	Episodes: "Multistorey, Part One"; "Multistorey, Part Two"
2003	Julius Caesar	Titus Labienus	Two-part Miniseries directed by Uli Edel
2004	Bo' Selecta!	Himself	"Episode Five"
2004–2005	A Bear's Tail	Richard Head	Series 4 – 7 episodes
2006	Agatha Christie's Marple	Dr. Owen Griffith	Episode: "The Moving Finger"
2006	Ancient Rome–The Rise And Fall of an Empire: Caesar	Julius Caesar	S1 E2 – "Caesar"
2007	Nuclear Secrets	Narrator	5 episodes
2007	The Tudors	English ambassador in the Italian Duchy of Urbino	Episode: "In Cold Blood"
2007	When Evil Calls	The Janitor	Miniseries – 2 episodes
2008	Honest	DS. Ed Bain	6 episodes
2008	The Wrong Door		4 episodes
2008	Skins	Soldier on the Train and Simon the Lecturer	Episode: "Tony"
2008	Journey to the Edge of the Universe	Narrator	Documentary
2009	Law & Order: UK	Josh Pritchard	Episode: "Vice"
2010	Luther	Terry Lynch	"Episode 2"
2011	National Geographic: Islands Series	Narrator	Cyprus
2011	Camelot	Sir Ector	Recurring; Series 1 – 3 episodes
2013	Jo	Charlie	8 episodes
2013	The Five(ish) Doctors Reboot	Himself	TV film
2013	Agatha Christie's Poirot	Sir George Stubbs	Episode: "Dead Man's Folly"
2013	Death in Paradise	Malcolm Powell	Episode: "A Deadly Party"
2013–2014	Elementary	Inspector Lestrade	3 episodes
2014–2019	Gotham	Alfred Pennyworth	Main cast – 99 episodes
2014	The Musketeers	Sarazin	Episode: "Musketeers Don't Die Easily"
2019	Prodigal Son	Owen Shannon	Episode: "Silent Night"
2020	Agatha Christie's The Pale Horse	Inspector Lejeune	2 episodes
2020	Two Weeks to Live	Jimmy	2 episodes
2023	You	Vic	3 episodes
2024–2025	Silent Witness	Detective Inspector John Flynn	4 episodes
2024	The Night Caller	Lawrence Brightway	4 episodes
2025	NCIS: Tony & Ziva	Aaron Graves	4 episodes
2025	The Hack	Sean Hoare	2 episodes
2026	Good Omens	Brian Cameron	Episode: "The Finale"
2026	Agatha Christie's Tommy & Tuppence	Simon	2 episodes
TBA	The Siege	TBA	Upcoming drama series

=== Theatre ===
Year	Title	Role	Notes	Refs.
1997	Tom Jones	Captain Fitzpatrick	A BBC adaptation for the stage by playwright Joan Macalpine.	

=== Radio ===
Year	Title	Role	Refs.
2011	Burning Both Ends	Oliver Reed	

=== Video games ===
Year	Title	Role/!Refs.
1996	The Gene Machine	Piers Featherstonehaugh
2001	Shadowman: Second Coming	Asmodeus & additional voices
2002	Medieval: Total War	Narrator
2003	Primal	Jared
2003	Warhammer 40,000: Fire Warrior	Governor Severus
2003	Gladiator: Sword of Vengeance	Invictus Thrax
2004	Killzone	Colonel Gregor Hakha
2008	Fable II	Additional Voices
2009	Killzone 2	Colonel Mael Radec
2010	Fable III	Captain Saker
2012	PlayStation All-Stars Battle Royale	Colonel Mael Radec
2013	Assassin's Creed IV: Black Flag	Peter Chamberlaine
2026	Assassin's Creed IV: Black Flag Resynced	Peter Chamberlaine
