= TDKR =

TDKR may refer to the following Batman media:

- The Dark Knight Returns, a 1986 four-issue limited series comic book
- The Dark Knight Rises, the 2012 finale in Christopher Nolan's Batman film trilogy
- Batman: The Dark Knight Returns (film), a two-part animated film based on the comic book
