= The Juice (film) =

Proposed American film shopped since 2013

- Directed by: Joshua Newton
- Written by: Joshua Newton
- Produced by: Kevin Farr; Alexander Newton; Joshua Newton; Steve Small
- Starring: Boris Kodjoe; Charlotte Kirk
- Edited by: Joshua Newton
- Production companies: Newton House; Project O. J.
- Country: United States
- Language: English

The Juice is a proposed American crime thriller film that has been shopped around since 2013. The concept originally carried a proposed title of An American Mystery, centered around Douglas McCann who advocated for the innocence of O. J. Simpson for the murders of Nicole Brown Simpson and Ron Goldman. The concept later carried a proposed title of Nicole and O.J. By October 2024, the concept carried its third different proposed title, The Juice, and revealed that the screenplay was not complete.

== Cast ==
- Boris Kodjoe as O. J. Simpson
- Charlotte Kirk as Nicole Brown Simpson
- Oliver Walker as Ron Goldman
- Danny Mahoney as Brett Cantor
- Alexander Man as Mark Fuhrman

== Production ==
On June 28, 2013, it was announced that British filmmaker Joshua Newton would write and direct a movie about the O. J. Simpson murder case to be titled An American Mystery. Newton extensively researched the case and claimed to have discovered startling new evidence that would present several other suspects with both the motive and opportunity to commit the murders of Nicole Brown Simpson and Ron Goldman. The film intended to be completed for release by summer 2014, with a proposed budget of $65 million. Simpson himself wanted to be involved with the project but Joshua Newton turned him down. Newton said that the project "has the capacity to challenge entrenched attitudes on a topic that has inspired visceral reactions for almost a generation."

Several people from the sports and political spectrums lent their support for the project such as former NBA player Bo Kimble, former NFL player Rosey Grier, former Texas state senator Rodney Ellis, and former U.S. Representative for California's 33rd congressional district Diane Watson, one of the film's associate producers and an inspirational force behind the project. Watson was good friends with Johnnie Cochran and said at a 2016 town hall meeting, about Cochran's portrayal in The People v. O. J. Simpson, "(of him coming) across as undignified, unlikable, and obsessed with using the race card to secure an acquittal – but that's not how he was and that's not what happened. The jury gave their verdict based on the evidence – nothing else. And if anyone wants to say differently I suggest they read the actual trial transcripts. There has been a massive misrepresentation of the truth, but fortunately things are about to change and the truth is about to come out."

In March 2018, it was announced that the title had been changed to Nicole and O.J., and that Boris Kodjoe and unknown actress Charlotte Kirk would portray the title characters. Newton stated that principal photography involving scenes with Kodje and Kirk began in February 2018 in Bulgaria, and that the film would be released in March 2019. In October 2020, Newton announced little filming had taken place, and that he needed to hire an actor and shoot shoot for 42 days to get scenes involving the character of Douglas McCann, a real-life attorney who repped Simpson in a 2000 civil suit against the Verizon precursor GTE for withholding phone records the attorney claimed would exonerate Simpson.

In April 2024, following Simpson's death, it was announced that Owen Wilson was offered $12 million to play Douglas McCann, but he refused as he was not a believer in the subject matter presented. The film was retitled The Juice, the concept of focusing on the Douglas McCann storyline had been dropped, and a teaser trailer was released, showing a hypothetical sequence with Simpson in an electric chair, and stating that the release date would be 2025. The teaser included a link to a Google Form requesting suggestions for "outrageous ideas" to include in the movie.

In 2018, Newton revealed that cast Kirk and Kodjoe because they strongly resembled Brown and Simpson, respectively. According to Kirk, Simpson was pleased with the production and offered Kirk advice on how to play Brown. In 2024, Kirk stated she expected the film would be shrouded in controversy upon release.

== See also ==
- The O. J. Simpson Story - 1995 TV movie
- American Tragedy - 2000 TV movie
- The People v. O.J. Simpson: American Crime Story
- The Murder of Nicole Brown Simpson
- List of abandoned and unfinished films
