= Four (2011 film) =

- Directed by: John Langridge
- Written by: Paul Chronnell
- Produced by: Craig Conway
- Starring: Martin Compston; Craig Conway; Kierston Wareing; Sean Pertwee
- Cinematography: Adrian Brown
- Edited by: John Langridge; Ben King
- Music by: Raiomond Mirza
- Production company: Oh My! Productions Ltd
- Release date: 21 October 2011
- Running time: 85 minutes
- Country: United Kingdom
- Language: English
- Budget: £500,000

Four is a British independent film directed by John Langridge and released in 2011.

== Plot ==
A jealous husband hires a movie-obsessed detective to kidnap his wife's lover and bring him to a derelict factory to administer some 'rough justice.' Once there, the husband discovers the detective has a revelation of his own. He has kidnapped the husband's wife as well.

== Cast ==
- Martin Compston as Lover
- Craig Conway as Husband
- Kierston Wareing as Wife
- Sean Pertwee as Detective
- George Morris as Sergeant Walker

== Reviews ==
Total Film's Paul Bradshaw wrote, "With just four actors, a single setting and more twists than a bag full of pretzels, John Langridge’s grimy lo-fi debut is almost smart, taut and nasty enough to bid for the Tarantino comparisons he’s obviously after." The Evening Standard's Derek Malcolm found the film "over-ambitious", starting "as an offbeat thriller with pseudo-Pinterish dialogue" and ending up "much like a horror movie."

Writing in The Guardian Mark Kermode praised the film, acknowledging that "John Langridge's tortuously twisted warehouse-bound tale of a cuckolded husband seeking vengeance on his wife's lover does at least attempt to get the very most out of very little", while The Independent wrote that the script "meditates on male insecurity and possessiveness", but that "the attempt at menace unwisely borrows quotations from Hollywood movies, [a fact] that make [the movie] sound rather wannabe in consequence.”

Time Out's Tom Huddleston wrote that "the cast make the best" of a script that is "as uninspired as the plot, all muttered threats, cockernee slang and an initially amusing, increasingly wearying overuse of the F-word."
