= Red Rock Entertainment =

UK film investment and production company

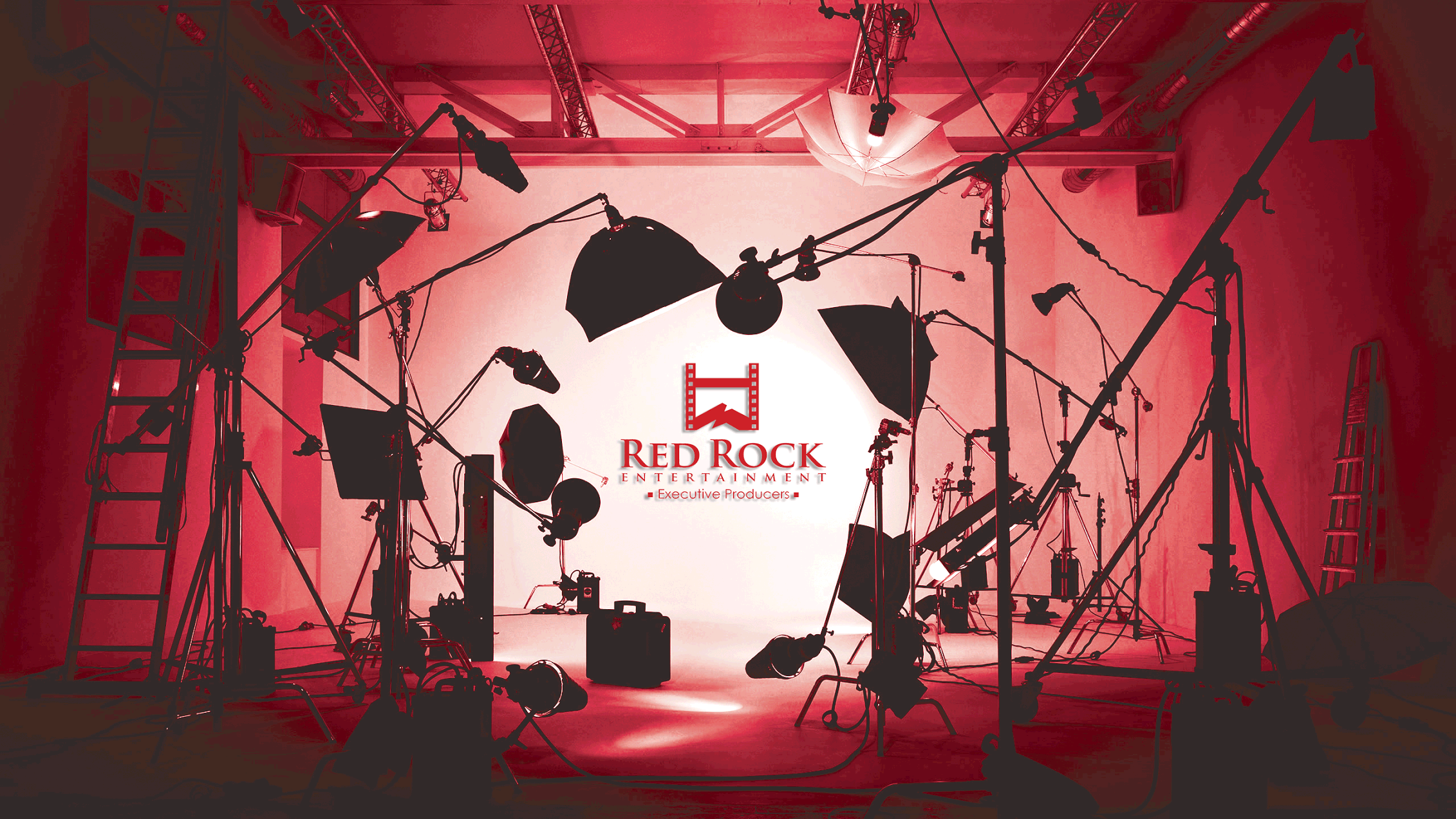
- Company type: Production company
- Industry: Film Production, Television Production
- Founder: Gary Collins
- Headquarters: Borehamwood, United Kingdom
- Area served: United Kingdom, Europe, US
- Products: Motion pictures, Television programmes
- Website: redrockentertainment.com

Red Rock Entertainment Ltd was a British film investment and production company based at Elstree Film Studios in Borehamwood, Hertfordshire (UK). The company acts as executive producers sourcing investment and finance for film and TV projects. Gary Collins is the CEO of Red Rock Entertainment.

== Background ==
Red Rock Entertainment mainly works on projects that are at an advanced stage and are looking for the final amount of financing. As an executive producer, Red Rock Entertainment arranges for investors to visit sets during filming, appear as extras and attend private screenings. It also arranges seminars at Elstree Studios, at which specialists offer advice and insight into the various tax advantages of investing in the UK.

== Notable films ==
- The Laureate(2021)
- Madness in the Method(2019)
- The Comedian's Guide to Survival(2016)
- That Good Night(1996)
- Breakdown(2016)
- Ibiza Undead(2016)
- Heretiks(2018)
- Cottage Country ( 2013)
- Night Train to Lisbon (2013)

== Television ==
Title	Notes
Boats and Bikes 1 and 2	Presenters, Joshua Kloss, Jessica Harbour, Adam Brudnicki and Otmara Marrero travel across the US and Cuba on ultra-cool motorcycles, review standout yachts and motorcycles. The show is directed by Sebastian Lyte.
Dystopia	It is the year 2037. Our world is dying, slowly, from a virus that has rendered mankind infertile. Not a single child has been born in 25 years. Governments are now powerless puppets for the biggest corporations and Biocorp, the world's biggest, keeps promising a cure that never comes.
No Easy Days (2018)	The President's daughter is kidnapped and held ransom by a British mercenary, and a rebellious Navy SEAL is the only hope of saving her.

== Documentaries ==
Title	Notes
HollyWood Bulldogs	Bulldogs, tells the rough-and-tumble story of the small community of British stunt performers who went on to dominate Hollywood in the 1970s and 80s. Growing out of the ragtag community of bouncers, gangsters and de-mobbed soldiers who were prepared to take a punch or chuck themselves down a flight of stairs for a few quid, the next generation went on to turn stunt work into a legitimate profession.
The Contractors	This documentary will focus on the life and times of private security contractors in hot spots and war zones around the world. These men and women do extraordinary jobs in extreme environments.
War Above the Trenches	From the origins, the technology and the personal stories, this presenter-led two-part documentary uses actuality and drama on location to reveal how Britain and France together were at the forefront of aerial combat one hundred years before their battles in the Middle East today. War Above the Trenches is an investigation into the bitter struggle for air superiority by France and Britain against Germany on the Western Front during World War One.
An Officer and his Holliness	The popularity and interest of millions of people around the world in Tibet and their exiled leader, His Holiness 14th Dalai Lama continues even half a century after China invaded Tibet. Why are so many people interested in his story and what can we learn from his principles of love and compassion? Fifty-eight years after China's Most Wanted Man escaped from occupied Tibet, this powerful documentary film follows The Dalai Lama as he returns to the Tibetan borderlands for the first time to retrace his remarkable journey and escape into exile in 1959. Remarkably, this is the first time that the story will have ever been told on film! Narrated by Joanna Lumley.
Walking with Elephants	Walking with Elephants is about the last great herds of elephants in Africa. With a population of barely 350,000 Savanah elephants left, the biggest of the planet's land animals face extinction within our lifetime. Half of these elephants during the dry season are densely populated in northern Botswana as they are protected by the government there. However, across the border into Namibia, Angola, Zambia and Zimbabwe – where many of the elephants return in the wet season, their future is fraught. In Kenya and Tanzania and South Africa, nearly all of the surviving elephants are enclosed in game reserves and no longer roam the wilderness that once saw them travel up to one hundred miles a day.
