= Zombie Spring Breakers =

- Directed by: Andy Edwards
- Written by: Andy Edwards
- Screenplay by: Andy Edwards
- Produced by: Templeheart Films
- Starring: Cara Theobold; Matt King; Alex Zane; Emily Atack
- Cinematography: Ewan Mulligan
- Edited by: Jason Rayment
- Music by: Chris J. Nairn
- Production companies: Templeheart Films; Capital City Entertainment; EnMar Productions; IU Films; Paranoid Android Films; Red Rock Entertainment
- Release date: 26 August 2016
- Running time: 95 minutes
- Country: United Kingdom
- Language: English
- Budget: $1 million

Zombie Spring Breakers (also Ibiza Undead) is a 2016 horror film written and directed by Andy Edwards. Premiered at London's FrightFest Film Festival in August 2016, the film stars Cara Theobold and Matt King. The story follows a similar plot to 2013's Go Goa Gone.

== Plot ==
A group of young people head to Ibiza for the holiday of a lifetime – only to find a zombie outbreak getting in the way. In the world of Ibiza Undead zombies are commonplace and a new strain of virus has started appearing across the globe, rendering its victims as flesh-eating maniacs. Britain has been severely affected, but zombie are managed and frequent checks ensure that no virus carriers make it across the borders. Club owner Karl (Matt King) decides that deranged podium dancing zombies are just what he needs for his Ibiza nightclub, so he commissions a boat full of them to be smuggled in. His plan backfires and his 'cargo' ends up in the Mediterranean. But the undead don’t stay dead, and when they make their way ashore the holiday paradise of Ibiza soon begins to resemble a war zone. Oblivious to these events, a gang of young British men - Jim, Alex and Az arrive on the island intent on a good time.

Other cast members include Cara Theobold as Alex's former girlfriend Ellie, Inbetweeners star Emily Atack as Alex’s older sister Liz, Algina Lipskis as Zara, and movie pundit Alex Zane who makes a cameo as a club promoter.

== Cast ==
- Cara Theobold as Ellie
- Emily Atack as Liz
- Algina Lipskis as Zara
- Jordan Coulson as Alex
- Homer Todiwala as Az
- Ed Kear as Big Jim
- Matt King as Karl
- Marcia do Vales as Maria
- Matt Kennard as Rupert
- Alex Felton as Todd
- Michael Wagg as Torval
- Alex Zane as club host
- Chris Simmons as beach cafe owner
- Seb Castang as Antonio
- Simon Brandon as Kenneth
- Callum Darcy as a zombie

== Reception ==
Hollywood News felt that the story moved along nicely but had too many characters, including Big Jim who they found 'a little too crass and sex-obsessed to win the audience over'. Bloody Disgusting gave it three and a half skulls out of five saying "This isn’t a great film by any stretch of the imagination, but I enjoyed it a lot more than I’d care to admit...It’s not exactly Shaun of the Dead, but Zombie Spring Breakers is definitely worth a watch."

Jessy Williams of Scream magazine panned the film, writing "All in all, Ibiza Undead is a disappointment. What could have been a self-aware, fun and witty romantic zomedy is merely a predictable mess that only serves to secure my general distaste of horror-comedies that only use sex and alcohol to generate laughs." Wicked Horror also disliked the film saying "Unfortunately, Ibiza Undead is mostly, like the lads at the centre of it all, a bit useless. It isn’t particularly funny and the horror elements aren’t strong enough to justify it as a real zombie movie."
