= Chase Me =

2003 American animated short film

- Title screen
- Directed by: Curt Geda
- Written by: Paul Dini; Alan Burnett
- Based on: Batman by: Bob Kane; Bill Finger
- Produced by: Alan Burnett; Margaret M. Dean; Curt Geda; Benjamin Melniker; Michael Uslan
- Music by: Lolita Ritmanis
- Production companies: DC Comics; Warner Bros. Television Animation
- Distributed by: Warner Home Video
- Release date: October 21, 2003
- Running time: 6 minutes
- Language: none (Silent film)

Chase Me is a 2003 American animated superhero short film based on The New Batman Adventures (1997–1999). The film was released as a bonus feature on the DVD for Batman: Mystery of the Batwoman in the U.S. on October 21, 2003, and was produced by Warner Bros. Animation.

The short, which follows Batman as he chases Catwoman across Gotham City, is made in old school silent film-style; it contains no dialogue or sound effects, only a musical score. The music is composed by Lolita Ritmanis, who also composed the score for Mystery of the Batwoman, as well as several episodes of The New Batman Adventures.

== Plot ==
Bruce Wayne gazes out the window of the Wayne Enterprises building during a party, before being pulled to the dance floor by three lovely young ladies. Each has a turn before Alfred rescues Bruce, who dives into a nearby elevator. When he reaches his office, he discovers Catwoman looting the safe. Catwoman pins Bruce to the wall while she finishes robbing the safe, and makes her escape. Bruce frees himself and gives chase as Batman.

Batman pursues Catwoman across the rooftops, and the chase begins. She dives off a roof and falls several stories below into busy traffic, breaking her fall with an overhanging banner and swinging onto a tour bus. She poses for some pictures until Batman lands on the tour bus, prompting Catwoman to flee once again.

Batman and Catwoman.

They jump on a milk truck tanker and Catwoman blows the tires out. The truck spins off, and Batman pursues after her, ignoring the truck dumping gallons of milk onto a couple of stray cats, as well as Harvey Bullock.

They jump on a train, where Batman loses track of Catwoman after going through a tunnel, only to see her trail leading into a zoo. Detouring through the Large Cats exhibit, she distracts Batman by freeing the lions and setting a panther on him. He escapes through the sunroof while Catwoman runs into an aviary, only to be chased out by a colony of bats. She is then cornered by Batman against the gates of the zoo. She notices he was scratched earlier, and leans in to kiss him. Batman pushes her away, and she appears hurt. Batman then sweeps her into his arms and kisses her.

The police arrive, and Catwoman looks around, concerned. She pushes at Batman to leave. Batman then slowly smiles at her before taking the bag of money and leaving. Catwoman smiles, thinking she has been let off easy, only to find herself handcuffed to the fence. She falls to the ground, despondent.

A remorseful Bruce Wayne looks through the window at the party, again, watching police cars fly past below, before a woman grabs his arm and pulls him back to the party.

== Music score ==
The soundtrack starts with a quiet bossa nova/cha-cha-cha piano theme, which features a flute solo and a female singing voice, with then later a high upbeat saxophone-led jazz style score that plays up the chase and slowly dips into a slower/methodical jazz score as the film reaches its downbeat climax. The opening theme is reused in the end credits.

== Home media ==
Chase Me was included as a bonus feature on the DVD and Blu-Ray releases of Batman: Mystery of the Batwoman.

== See also ==
- Batman: Strange Days
