= Templeheart Films =

British film company

Templeheart Films is a British independent film investment and production company.

== History ==
The company was founded in 2008 by Lyndon Baldock. Since its formation, Templeheart has been involved in the finance, development and production of over thirty feature films and in the British Film Institute's Statistical Yearbook (2015) was ranked eighth highest in the list of UK production companies. The company has a range of UK and US productions and aims to invest in emerging talent, while encouraging financiers to join the film industry.

== Films (co-produced) ==
- Risen (2010)
- Jack Falls (2011)
- The Reverend (2011)
- How to Stop Being a Loser (2011)
- The Hooligan Wars (2012)
- Deranged (2012)
- Airborne (2012)
- The Rise and Fall of a White Collar Hooligan (2012)
- The Seasoning House (2012)
- Riot (2012)
- The Warning (2012)
- The Zombie King (2013)
- My Bloody BFF: the Making of Deranged (2013)
- White Collar Hooligan 2: England Away (2013)
- Shame the Devil (2013)
- He Who Dares (2014)
- Deadly Virtues: Love, Honour, Obey (2014)
- Devil's Tower (2014)
- The London Firm (2016)
- Heretiks (2016)
- Being Keegan (2016)
- Ibiza Undead (2016)
- Riot (2017)
- The Last Scout (2017
- Being Keegan (2017)
- The Convent (2018)
- The Tombs (2019)
- Lead Belly (2019)
- A Mouthful of Air (2021)
- Blank (2022)
- Future TX (2022)
- Never Forget Tibet (2022)
- Compulsion (2024)
