= Charlotte Kirk =

British actress (born 1992)

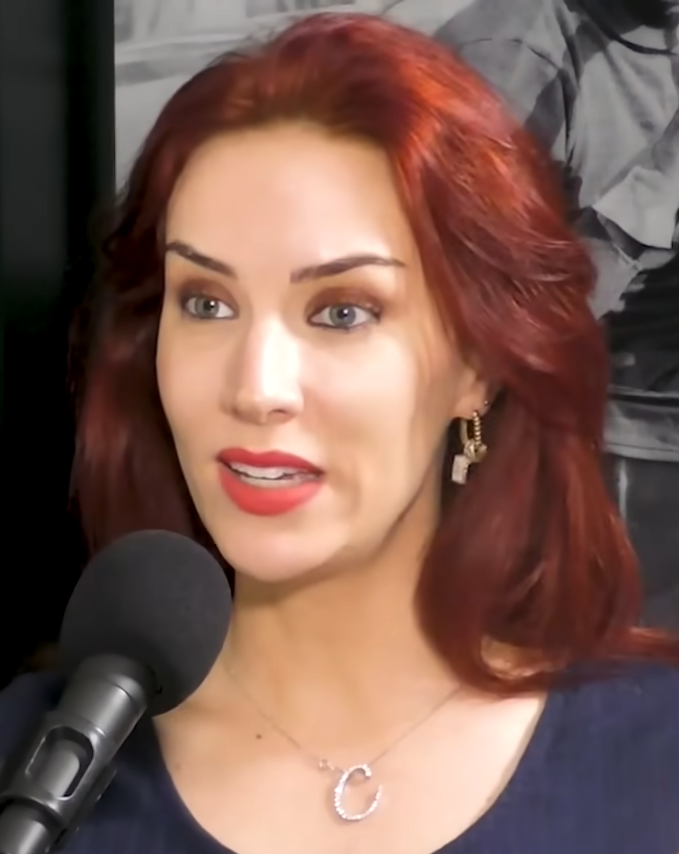
- Charlotte Kirk in 2023
- Born: 16 June 1992 (age 34); Kent, England
- Occupations: Actress, screenwriter, producer
- Years active: 2013–present
- Partner: Karlos Ways (2023-present)
- Children: 1
- Website: charlottekirk.com

Charlotte Kirk (born 16 June 1992) is a British actress, screenwriter and producer.

== Early life ==
Charlotte Kirk was born in Sidcup, South East London in 1992, the youngest daughter of Angela and Arthur Kirk. As a young girl, she was diagnosed with dyslexia and Asperger syndrome.

She first began theatre acting at the age of 9, performing in plays such as Agamemnon and Arturo Ui, followed by West End musical theatre productions of A Christmas Carol, Oliver Twist, and Hairspray. Having attended the Italia Conti Academy of Theatre Arts in London, she trained with Jigsaw Performing Arts in the UK.

== Career ==
In 2013, Kirk appeared in the documentary film Seduced and Abandoned. Kirk was first recognised for her role in Vice (2015), a sci-fi thriller, opposite Bruce Willis and Thomas Jane. Further feature film roles included playing the female lead opposite Stephen Baldwin in film-noir comedy No Panic with a Hint of Hysteria (2016) and the female lead in psychological drama The Depths (2017), alongside appearances in How To Be Single (2017) and Ocean's 8 (2018).

In 2013, billed as an unknown newcomer, Kirk was cast to play Nicole Brown Simpson in a proposed film to be called An American Mystery; as of 2018, some scenes had been shot for the film, renamed Nicole and O.J.; by 2024 the proposed film was renamed The Juice, confirming that the screenplay was unfinished and no filming had taken place beyond the 30 minutes of scenes filmed in 2018.

She co-wrote, produced, and starred in The Reckoning (2020), directed by Neil Marshall.

In 2021, Kirk starred in, co-wrote, and co-produced the action horror movie The Lair, directed by Neil Marshall, released in US in October 2022 and in the UK in January 2023. The Lair had its world premiere in Leicester Square IMAX as the opening night gala presentation at 2022's FrightFest film festival.

Kirk returned to the UK in 2021 and formed Scarlett Productions and Primal Empire Studios Ltd. In the summer of 2022, Kirk completed filming on the action crime thriller Duchess, which she co-wrote, produced, and plays the title role. Duchess was released in cinemas worldwide in 2024. Kirk released two music videos, "Eyes in Love" and "I Get the Feeling Again" and performed the end title track for No Panic with a Hint of Hysteria. She has also appeared on magazine covers for LA Magazine, Glamour, and Harper's Bazaar.

In April 2024, Kirk filmed scenes for the thriller horror film The Possession at Gladstone Manor. In June 2024, Kirk was named one of the Top 30 Influential Leaders in the UK by Leaders of the Business & Charity Magazine.

In 2025, Kirk starred in Exit Protocol opposite Dolph Lundgren and Michael Jai White. Kirk starred in the erotic thriller movie Compulsion opposite Anna Maria Sieklucka which was released in 2025.

== Legal case ==
In March 2019, leaked text messages showed that Kevin Tsujihara had promised auditions and acting jobs to Kirk in return for sex, facilitated by her then-friend, businessman James Packer, in September 2013. WarnerMedia was investigating the allegations. In September 2020, her lawyers filed a petition in the Los Angeles Superior Court to vacate a gag order that has kept her mostly silent amid the years-long battle. The petition paints a picture of Tsujihara engaging in nonconsensual sex. The Hollywood Reporter also revealed information about how Tsujihara and former NBCUniversal Vice-chairman Ronald Meyer colluded to cover up the real nature of their relationships with Kirk, reached settlement and court cases.

== Personal life ==
While living in LA, Kirk met film and television director Neil Marshall. The two were engaged to marry as of August 2020 but later separated.

In January 2026, Kirk gave birth to a son with her fiancé film producer Karlos Ways.

Kirk is an advocate of animal rights.

== Filmography ==
=== Film ===
	Title	Role	Notes
2013	Fractured	Hellion	
2013	Dracula: The Dark Prince	Additional Voice	Voice; Uncredited
2014	Non-Stop	Amy Harris	
2014	When the Game Stands Tall	Miss Peoria - Football Beauty Contest Contestant	Uncredited
2014	Tekken: A Man Called X	Chloe	
2014	Let's Be Cops	Chief Operative	Uncredited
2015	Vice	Melissa	
2015	Black Dog, Red Dog	Lilian	
2016	How to Be Single	Tiffany	
2016	No Panic, with a Hint of Hysteria	Melanie	
2016	Marauders	Vanessa's Receptionist	
2017	The Demo	Jessica Davis	
2017	The Depths	Chloe	
2017	First Kill	News Anchor	
2018	The Juice	Nicole Brown Simpson	
2018	Ocean's 8	Cara	
2018	Ulysses: A Dark Odyssey	Kaly	
2020	The Reckoning	Grace Haverstock	Co-writer, Exec. Prod.
2022	The Lair	Capt. Kate Sinclair	Co-writer, Exec. Prod.
2024	Bermondsey Tales: Fall of the Roman Empire	Lena	
2024	Duchess	Scarlett Monaghan / Duchess	Co-writer, Exec. Prod.
2024	Compulsion	Diana	
2025	Exit Protocol	Danique Kellar	
2026	Jackie the Stripper	Jackie	
2026	The Possession at Gladstone Manor	Sam	
2026	The Night Driver	Max	
2026	Christmas & Chaos	Sadie Peters	Completed

=== Television ===
	Title	Role	Notes
2016	Kat Fight!	Russian Bride	TV film

== Awards ==
Kirk has won 13 awards and received 12 nominations.

Year	Award	Prize
2022	Richard Harris International Film Festival	Nominated – Best Actor in a Female Role for The Lair (2022)
2021	Berlin Independent Film Festival, DE	Won, Festival Prize – Best Actor for The Reckoning (2020)
2020	Best Actor Awards	Won, Special Jury Award Outstanding Performance for The Reckoning (2020)
2020	Global Independent Film Awards	Won, Gold Award – Best Narrative Screenplay for The Reckoning (2020) Won, Gold Award – Best Actress in a Lead Role for The Reckoning (2020) 2nd place, Silver Award – Best Narrative Feature for The Reckoning (2020)
2020	Los Angeles Film Awards	Won, Festival Award – Best Original Story for The Reckoning (2020) Won, Festival Award – Best Actress for The Reckoning (2020)
2020	Los Angeles Independent Film Festival Awards	Won, LAIFF Summer Award – Best Actress for The Reckoning (2020) Won, LAIFF Summer Award – Best Picture for The Reckoning (2020)
2020	New York International Film Awards	Won, June Monthly Award – Best Actress for The Reckoning (2020)
2020	Oniros Film Awards	Won, July Monthly Edition – Best Screenplay for The Reckoning (2020) Won, July Monthly Edition – Best Actress for The Reckoning (2020)
2020	Vegas Movie Awards	Won, Award of Excellence – Best Narrative Feature for The Reckoning (2020) Won, Award of Excellence – Best Actress for The Reckoning (2020)
