= The Reckoning (2020 film) =

2020 film directed by Neil Marshall

- Film poster
- Directed by: Neil Marshall
- Written by: Neil Marshall; Charlotte Kirk; Edward Evers-Swindell
- Produced by: Daniel-Konrad Cooper; Michael Marks; Steffen Wild; Esther Turan
- Starring: Charlotte Kirk; Joe Anderson; Steven Waddington; Sean Pertwee
- Cinematography: Luke Bryant
- Music by: Christopher Drake
- Production company: Fourth Culture Films
- Release dates: 20 August 2020 (Fantasia); 5 February 2021 (United States)
- Running time: 110 minutes
- Country: United Kingdom
- Language: English
- Box office: $596,806

The Reckoning is a 2020 adventure horror film directed by Neil Marshall, from a screenplay by Marshall, Charlotte Kirk and Edward Evers-Swindell. It stars Kirk, Joe Anderson, Steven Waddington and Sean Pertwee. The film follows a woman accused of being a witch after losing her husband to plague.

Filming took place in Budapest, Hungary. Both interior and exterior scenes were filmed at Fot Studios, Hungary on sets built and designed by Ian Bailie.

The film had its world premiere at the Fantasia International Film Festival on 20 August 2020 and was released to limited theaters and digital on 5 February 2021.

== Plot ==
In 1665, after losing her husband during the Great Plague of London (1665–1666), Grace Haverstock (Kirk) is unjustly accused of being a witch and placed in the custody of England's most ruthless witch-hunter, Judge Moorcroft (Pertwee). Forced to endure physical and emotional torture while steadfastly maintaining her innocence, Grace must face her own inner demons as the Devil himself starts to work his way into her mind.

== Cast ==
- Charlotte Kirk as Grace
- Sean Pertwee as Moorcroft
- Steven Waddington as Pendleton
- Joe Anderson as Joseph
- Rick Warden as Rev Malcolm
- Mark Ryan as Peck
- Bill Fellows as Sutter
- Suzanne Magowan as Ursula
- Leon Ockenden as Morton
- Sarah Lambie as Kate
- Emma Campbell-Jones as Jane
- Ian Whyte as The Devil
- Maximilian Slash Marton as The Stable Boy
- Wayne Brett as Heinrich

== Filming ==
While The Reckoning is set in Northern England in 1665, the film was shot entirely in Budapest, Hungary in 2019.

== Release ==
The film had its world premiere at the Fantasia International Film Festival on 20 August 2020; its UK premiere at the London FrightFest Film Festival on 23 October 2020; and its US premiere at Beyond Fest in October 2020 as a physical event at a drive-in theatre. The film was released on Blu-ray and DVD in the USA by RLJE Films on 6 April 2021.

== Reception ==
The film received negative reviews from critics. It currently holds a score of 19% on Rotten Tomatoes, with the consensus reading, "Thematically and visually unpleasant, The Reckoning wallows in the same violent misogyny it purports to condemn." On Metacritic, the film received a score of 31 out of 100 based on 7 reviews, indicating "generally unfavorable reviews".
