= Wade Williams (actor) =

American actor (born 1961)

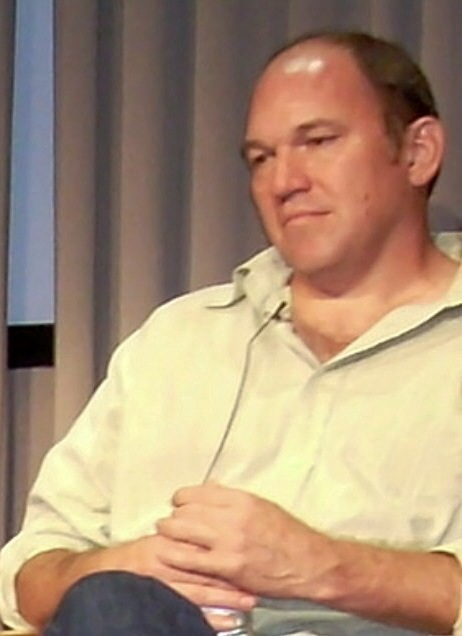
- Williams in 2008
- Born: December 24, 1961 (age 64); Tulsa, Oklahoma, U.S.
- Occupation: Actor
- Years active: 1997–present

Wade Williams (Note: Sometimes credited as Wade Andrew Williams.) (born December 24, 1961) is an American actor. He is known for his various character roles, and for a major supporting role as correctional officer Brad Bellick on the Fox television series Prison Break and Father Cronin on The Bernie Mac Show (2001–2004). Williams also voiced Black Mask in Batman: Under the Red Hood and voiced Two-Face in Batman: The Dark Knight Returns (2012–2013).

== Early life ==
Wade Williams was born on December 24, 1961 in Tulsa, Oklahoma.

== Filmography ==
=== Film ===
Year	Title	Role	Notes
1998	Route 9	Earl Whitney	
1999	Candyman: Day of the Dead	Samuel Kraft	Direct-to-video
1999	K-911	Devon Lane	Direct-to-video
2000	What Planet Are You From?	Planet Man	
2000	Erin Brockovich	Ted Daniels	
2000	Terror Tract	Clay Hendricks	Segment: "Nightmare"
2001	Ali	Lieutenant Jerome Claridge	
2002	Bark!	Tom	
2002	Local Boys	Ray	
2002	Bug	Alicia's Dad	
2002	Ken Park	Claude's Father	
2003	I Witness	Roy Logan	
2004	American Crime	Mack Jones	Direct-to-video
2004	Collateral	Fed #2	
2006	Flicka	Man with Clipboard	
2009	The Hole	Monster Dad	Voice
2010	The Last Harbor	Sheriff Ian	
2010	Batman: Under the Red Hood	Roman Sionis / Black Mask	Voice, direct-to-video
2011	Green Lantern: Emerald Knights	Deegan	Voice, direct-to-video
2011	The Good Doctor	Mr. Nixon	
2012	The Dark Knight Rises	Blackgate Warden	
2012–2013	Batman: The Dark Knight Returns	Harvey Dent / Two-Face	Voice, direct-to-video
2012	That Guy... Who Was in That Thing	Himself	Documentary
2013	Gangster Squad	Rourke	
2013	Superman: Unbound	Perry White	Voice, direct-to-video
2014	Draft Day	O'Reilly	
2016	Spaceman	Tom Fulton	
2016	Message from the King	Keegan	
2018	The Darkest Minds	The Captain	
2018	Venom	Prison Guard	Mid-credits scene
2019	3 from Hell	Buford Tuttle	
2020	Roe v. Wade	William Rehnquist	

=== Television ===
Year	Title	Role	Notes
1997	Profiler	Craig Gentry	Episode: "Film at Eleven"
1998	The Larry Sanders Show	Mike	Episode: "Beverly's Secret"
1998	Star Trek: Voyager	Trajis Lo-Tarik	Episode: "One"
1998	NYPD Blue	Arnold Struel	Episode: "Brother's Keeper"
1998	Chicago Hope	Jerry Peru	Episode: "The Other Cheek"
1998	Silk Stalkings	Cliff Carpenter	Episode: "Behind the Music"
1998	Seven Days	Capt. Marc Golden	Episode: "Sleepers"
1999	Sons of Thunder	Jack Lesofsky	Episode: "Moment of Truth"
1999	Promised Land	Ed Angelo	Episode: "A Day in the Life"
1999	L.A. Heat	Johnny Claringer Jr.	Episode: "In Harm's Way"
1999	ER	Migraine Guy	Episode: "Leave It to Weaver"
1999	Touched by an Angel	Bum	Episode: "Voice of an Angel"
2000	Becker	George	Episode: "Sight Unseen"
2000	Good vs. Evil	Jeremy the Painter	Episode: "Portrait of Evil"
2000	Secret Agent Man	Greg	Episode: "Sleepers"
2000	Nash Bridges	Edward Strode	Episode: "Rock and a Hard Place"
2000	Walker, Texas Ranger	Jerome Cutter	Episode: "The Avenging Angel"
2001	The X-Files	Ray Pearce	Episode: "Salvage"
2001	Charmed	Seeker #2	Episode: "Death Takes a Halliwell"
2001	Buffy the Vampire Slayer	General Gregor	Episode: "Spiral"
2001	Gideon's Crossing	Dr. Larue	Episode: "The Race"
2001	Six Feet Under	Paul Kovitch	Episode: "Brotherhood"
2001	Star Trek: Enterprise	Garos	Episode: "Civilization"
2001–2005	The Bernie Mac Show	Father Cronin	Recurring role
2002	24	Robert Ellis	2 episodes
2002	CSI: Crime Scene Investigation	Mr. Reston	Episode: "The Execution of Catherine Willows"
2002	Crossing Jordan	FBI Criminologist Barker	Episode: "One Twelve"
2002	Robbery Homicide Division	ATF Agent Frank Winters	Episode: "Life Is Dust"
2002	MDs	Big Thor Amundsen	Main role
2003	Threat Matrix	Teddy	Episode: "Veteran's Day"
2003	Boomtown	Paul Barnes	Episode: "Inadmissible"
2003	JAG	Sheriff Brad Driskell	Episode: "Posse Comitatus"
2003	CSI: Miami	Jack Hawkins	Episode: "Extreme"
2004	Las Vegas	Richard Allen Wesley	Episode: "Nevada State"
2004	Tru Calling	Carl Neesan	Episode: "Daddy's Girl"
2005	Kojak	Niko Manos	Episode: "All Bets Off: Part 2"
2005	Over There	Bo Rider Sr.	2 episodes
2005–2008	Prison Break	Brad Bellick	Main role (seasons 1–4)
2008	Avatar: The Last Airbender	Warden	Voice, episode: "The Boiling Rock"
2009	Criminal Minds	Detective Andrews	Episode: "Hopeless"
2009	Monk	Captain Frank Willis	Episode: "Mr. Monk Goes Camping"
2010	Leverage	Nickolas Kusen	Episode: "The Future Job"
2010	Bones	Sheriff Gus Abrams	Episode: "The Witch in the Wardrobe"
2010	The Whole Truth	Detective Razik	Episode: "True Confessions"
2010	Batman: The Brave and the Bold	Supreme Chairman of Qward	Voice, episode: "Cry Freedom Fighters!"
2011	Chase	Alvin Hawkins	Episode: "Annie"
2011	Memphis Beat	Ted Creskoe	Episode: "Lost"
2011	Burn Notice	Carter	Episode: "Mind Games"
2011	The Mentalist	Jack LaFleur	Episode: "Blood and Sand"
2012	Longmire	Russell Gray	Episode: "The Worst Kind of Hunter"
2012	Common Law	Timothy Mullen	Episode: "Hot for Teacher"
2012	Touch	Braeden	Episode: "The Road Not Taken"
2012	Vegas	Sam Kovacs	Episode: "(Il)Legitimate"
2012	Naughty or Nice	Bill	Television film
2013	NCIS	Larry Purcell	Episode: "Under the Radar"
2013	The Legend of Korra	Ship Captain	Voice, episode: "The Sting"
2014	Crisis	Delman Birch	2 episodes
2014	The Night Shift	Max Leonard	Episode: "Save Me"
2014	The Bridge	Mr. Merco	Episode: "Rakshasa"
2014	Revenge	Officer Jim Mostrowski	2 episodes
2014	Beware the Batman	Waylon Jones / Killer Croc, Ernie Croskey	Voice, 3 episodes
2015	Scorpion	Prison Warden	Episode: "Fish Filet"
2015	Code Black	Nick Gabler	Episode: "Doctors with Borders"
2015	The League	Ruben	Episode: "The Block"
2015	Transparent	Mr. Irons	Episode: "New World Coming"
2016	Grimm	Mark Holloway	Episode: "Star-Crossed"
2016	The Loud House	Coach, Public Address Announcer	Voice, episode: "The Loudest Yard"
2016	Westworld	Captain Norris	Episode: "Contrapasso"
2016–2017	Mercy Street	Silas Bullen	Main role, 10 episodes
2017	Elementary	Ryan Decker	Episode: "Be My Guest"
2017	The Blacklist	Edgar / The Debt Collector	Episode: "The Debt Collector (No. 46)"
2017	The Mick	Ziggy	Episode: "The Visit"
2021	Cowboy Bebop	Fad	

=== Video games ===
Year	Title	Voice role
2005	Gun	Rudabaugh
2006	Hitman: Blood Money	John "Pappy" Leblanc
2009	The Chronicles of Riddick: Assault on Dark Athena	Spinner
2010	Prison Break: The Conspiracy	Capt. Brad Bellick
