= The Lair (2022 film) =

- Theatrical release poster
- Directed by: Neil Marshall
- Written by: Neil Marshall; Charlotte Kirk
- Produced by: Daniel Conrad-Cooper; Kwesi Dickson; Jonathan Halperyn
- Starring: Charlotte Kirk; Jamie Bamber; Jonathan Howard; Hadi Khanjanpour
- Cinematography: Luke Bryant
- Edited by: Neil Marshall
- Music by: Christopher Drake
- Release date: 25 August 2022 (UK)
- Running time: 97 minutes
- Country: United Kingdom
- Language: English
- Box office: $156,597

The Lair is a 2022 British action horror film directed by Neil Marshall and co-written with Charlotte Kirk.

== Plot ==
In 2017, Royal Air Force pilots Captain Kate Sinclair and WSO Terry Johnson are shot down over Afghanistan. They are attacked by insurgents and Johnson is killed. Unable to call for help, Sinclair stumbles upon an abandoned Soviet bunker, and the insurgents follow.

Inside the bunker, grotesque humanoid creatures with claws end up being released from stasis. Sinclair is injured but manages to escape the bunker, while the monsters kill the insurgents. She is found by a group of U.S. soldiers in a Humvee. They take her to a small outpost nearby. There she is treated and tells Major Roy Finch about what happened in the bunker. Finch calls his superiors about the situation.

The creatures attack the outpost that night, killing several soldiers and taking the bodies. Finch is injured and becomes unconscious. The survivors hide in the armory, and the monsters soon leave. Kabir, who was alive during the Soviet-Afghan War, claims that a star fell from the sky shortly before the Soviet invasion in 1979, meant as a warning from God. Many people from his village disappeared over the next several years, ending as soon as the Soviet withdrawal occurred. Kabir's father was among the disappeared, so he wanted to avenge him.

They find that one of the monster bodies was left behind at the outpost. It has very tough skin, but Wilks performs a dissection and discovers human organs inside. Then Finch wakes up, and reveals the truth he had learned from his superiors. The USSR had discovered an alien spacecraft that crashed in Afghanistan; this was the real reason for the invasion. They experimented to combine human and alien DNA. The US military had long known of a possible Soviet black site in the region, but was unable to identify the exact location.

However, the creature they were dissecting is not actually dead and attacks, using tentacles from its head on Sinclair. By doing so, it is able to read her thoughts and predict her subsequent actions. Finch sacrifices himself to kill it with a grenade.

The team then goes back to the bunker, planning to destroy it with C4. However, Hook is dragged down by one of the monsters. Sinclair wants to go after him; Jones, Kabir, Lafayette, and Bromhead agree. Wilks stays to man the winch, which is used to lower the elevator down.

However, the monsters intended this as an ambush. Furthermore, Wilks learns that the military will be dropping a bunker buster bomb in 20 minutes, having found out the location from the Humvee's transponder. All of the team down there except for Sinclair and Hook end up being killed. Before dying, Kabir encounters a monster which he recognizes as his father, confirming that the disappeared individuals were turned into the creatures.

Wilks is attacked by insurgents and the Humvee is dragged into the elevator shaft. He is captured and about to be beheaded, but is saved by Sinclair and Hook. The three then take one of the insurgents' vehicles and escape shortly before the bomb drops, destroying the bunker.

Afterwards, an American black ops team arrives to the outpost, unsuccessfully attempting to find a creature specimen.

== Cast ==
- Charlotte Kirk as Capt. Kate Sinclair
- Jonathan Howard as Sgt. Tom Hook
- Jamie Bamber as Major Roy Finch
- Leon Ockenden as Sgt. Oswald Jones
- Troy Alexander as Trooper Dave Bromhead
- Harry Taurasi as Trooper Vince Hughes
- Mark Strepan as Corp. Kip Wilks
- Hadi Khanjanpour as Kabir Abdul Rahimi
- Kibong Tanji as Corp. Jade Lafayette
- Mark Arends as Pvt. Dwayne Everett
- Adam Bond as Pvt. Eddie Serano
- Alex Morgan as WSO Terry Johnson

== Reception ==
The Lair received mixed reviews from critics. As of August 2024, the film holds a 35% approval rating on review aggregator Rotten Tomatoes based on 20 reviews.

Variety wrote: "There's nary a dull moment, albeit no truly memorable ones either. It's a movie more hectic than exciting, let alone scary. But it does move along at a brisk clip that attests to the director's knack for staging and pacing splattery action". Noel Murray of the Los Angeles Times wrote: "The Lair doesn't finish as spectacularly as it starts, but that just means it's a good genre picture and not a great one". Simon Abrams of RogerEbert.com awarded the film two-and-a-half stars out of four, calling it "a good-enough horror/action hybrid", praising the action scenes and practical effects of the monsters but had a more mixed opinion on the acting and dialogue.

=== Box office ===
The film grossed $156,597 at the box office worldwide.

== See also ==
- Monster film
