= Oliver Walker =

British actor

- Born: 23 September 1985 (age 40)
- Education: Arts Educational Schools London
- Occupation: Actor
- Years active: 2001–present
- Height: 6 ft 1 in (185 cm)

Oliver Walker (born 23 September 1985) is a British actor, known for his role on the TV series Atlantis. He has also made guest appearances on Doctors, Holby City and Coronation Street, among others.

== Career ==
In 2013, Walker was a key cast member of the fantasy show Atlantis aired on BBC One based on Greek myth and the mythological city Atlantis. He played Heptarian, one of the series' antagonists, who plots along with the main villain, Pasiphaë.

== Filmography ==
Film
Year	Title	Role	Notes
2012	Trapped	Greg	
2012	The Stitch	Man	Short film
2015	Lake Placid vs. Anaconda	Deputy Ferguson	TV film
2015	Viking Quest	Wolven	TV film
2015	Carpe Noctem	—N/a	Short film
Unreleased	The Juice	Ron Goldman	Principal photography is incomplete.

Television
Year	Title	Role	Notes
2001	Doctors	Scott Brandon	Episode: "A Twist of Fate"
2013	Atlantis	Heptarian	8 episodes
2014	Doctors	Gavin Cooper	Episode: "The Girl in the Photograph"
2015	A.D. The Bible Continues	Maximus Appius	Episode: "The Abomination"
2015	Holby City	Sean Brady	5 episodes
2016	Indian Summers	Cecil Thompson	2 episodes
2017	Doctors	Dr Adam Cridge	Episode: "The Terminator"
2017	The Brave	Josh Wells	Episode: "Pilot"
2017	Coronation Street	Chris Anderton	3 episodes
2017	Victoria	Winterhalter	Episode: "Comfort and Joy" (Christmas special)
2019	Treadstone	Matheson	Recurring role; 3 episodes

Video games
Year	Title	Role	Notes
2017	Hellblade: Senua's Sacrifice	Dillion	Live action performance blended in the game with animation

== Awards ==
Walker was awarded the Em-Lou Production and Drill Hall Award and the Micheal Mac Liammoir Award for Best Actor at the International Dublin Gay Theatre Festival in 2011.

== Personal life ==
Walker is from Plymouth and currently lives in London. He previously studied at Arts Educational Schools London before becoming an actor.
