= Compulsion (2024 film) =

2024 British thriller film

- Directed by: Neil Marshall
- Written by: Neil Marshall
- Story by: Charlotte Kirk; Neil Marshall
- Produced by: Kristyna Sellnerova; Andre Loggenberg
- Cinematography: Ali Asad
- Edited by: Catriona Delbridge
- Music by: Paul Lawler
- Production companies: DO Productions Malta; Kristyna Sellnerova; Primal Empire Studios; Cork Films; Media Finance Capital; Templeheart Films
- Distributed by: Disruptor Media (Australia); Lighthouse Home Entertainment (Germany); Saban Films (U.S.); Synapse Distribution (Latin America); WW Entertainment (Netherlands)
- Release dates: October 9, 2024; (Hot Springs International Horror Film Festival); 19 September 2025 (Spain)
- Running time: 101 minutes
- Country: United Kingdom
- Language: English

Compulsion is a 2024 British thriller film directed by Neil Marshall.

== Plot ==
A woman vacationing in her stepfather's home on Malta is seduced by her female neighbor, who is interested in what might be locked inside a vault in the house. As foreigners on the island, both women become suspects when a leather-clad serial killer begins murdering men on the island.

== Cast ==
- Charlotte Kirk as Diana
- Matthew Camilleri as Francis
- Zach McGowan as Reese
- Anna-Maria Sieklucka as Evie
- Emily Corcoran as Melania
- Antonella Axisa as Chief's Secretary
- Giulia Gorietti as Detective Claudia Cavara
- Cinzia Monreale as Madam Karmelina
- Mikhail Basmadjian as Police Chief Mario Cavara
- Rebecca Dimech as Forensic Technician
- Matteo Caruana Bond as Gianni
- Mike Tabone as Police Officer
- Harvey Dean as Inspector Dennes Crawford
- Mark Meilak as Laguna Restaurant Waiter (uncredited)
- Theodore Zammit as Paramedic (uncredited)

== Production ==
Tyler Nicholas of Joblo interviewed Marshall and Kirk, and Marshall stated that it might be the last erotic thriller that he will direct, stating: "To be honest, this might be the last time I do that kind of thing because it's okay to try to achieve an effect for an erotic thriller or whatever, but filming one of these scenes is incredibly boring. I'd much rather be doing action or horror because they’re way more fun".

== Reception ==
Reviewer Freeman of Actionfreunde wrote: "For a long time, Compulsion stumbles around aimlessly. None of the storylines feel compelling, none build any tension, and none provide any pace. Neil Marshall should have been honest with himself and simply written a straightforward softcore porn film about Charlotte's truly amazing body, devoid of any plot. Presumably, not only Charlotte but also the viewer would have been more than satisfied. Instead, we're presented with several dysfunctional storylines that are brought together and resolved in a sometimes absurd way towards the end. There are no surprises left, as the viewer already knows what's going on. On top of that, we have to watch Kirk try to play a femme fatale, only to fail miserably. Other actors in the film also deliver utterly inept performances".

Tyler Doupé of Dread Central wrote: "While I wish I could say that this is Marshall's comeback picture, that simply isn’t the case. Compulsion is rough around the edges and will probably fail to land for most. With that said, I enjoyed it enough to cautiously recommend the flick to a very specific audience".

Daniel Gorman of In Review Online wrote: "It's all unabashedly titillating and gratuitous, a cheap version of a Joe Eszterhas thriller in an era when such things are extremely out of fashion. [...] It all builds up to a ludicrous twist ending, an absurd rug pull that is as gleefully dumb as it is immensely satisfying".

Jennie Kermode of Eye For Film gave the film a rating of three and a half out of five stars, writing: "The weak link, of course, is the acting, with a couple of really clunky supporting performances that threaten to break the spell of the rest. There’s also some distinctly cheesy dialogue, but this doesn't feel out of place. All in all, it's an above average example of the genre, and it never takes itself too seriously, with a wonderfully awkward twist close to the end. Viewers choosing this sort of film know what they’re letting themselves in for, and they’re likely to have a good time".

Joe Shearer of Midwest Film Journal wrote: "Compulsion just never feels authentic, bloody or graphic enough. Bava and Argento made us feel eminently uncomfortable, and nothing here rises above either typical slasher-horror levels or low-grade sexual titillation. The thin, noirish quality of the characters doesn't help, and Compulsion often feels shot on a shoestring with overly bright daytime sequences and no real way to maximalize Malta's natural beauty to create compelling counterpoints. Marshall's usual sense of style squeezes through in a few shots, but they're sandwiched between poorly acted moments that lack necessary giallo passion".

Elijah Fischer of Moviejawn wrote: "Compulsion's script is shallow, often finding itself struggling to justify moving from one scene to the next, but what the film lacks in substance it more than makes up for visually".
