= Dog Soldiers (film) =

2002 film directed by Neil Marshall

- Theatrical release poster
- Directed by: Neil Marshall
- Written by: Neil Marshall
- Produced by: Christopher Figg; Tom Reeve; David E. Allen
- Starring: Sean Pertwee; Liam Cunningham; Kevin McKidd; Emma Cleasby
- Cinematography: Sam McCurdy
- Edited by: Neil Marshall
- Music by: Mark Thomas
- Production companies: Kismet Entertainment Group; The Noel Gay Motion Picture Company; Victor Film Company; Carousel Picture Company
- Distributed by: Pathé
- Release dates: 22 March 2002 (Brussels); 10 May 2002 (United Kingdom)
- Running time: 104 minutes
- Country: United Kingdom
- Language: English
- Budget: £2.3 million
- Box office: £5 million

Dog Soldiers is a 2002 British action horror film written, directed and edited by Neil Marshall in his feature directorial debut. Starring Sean Pertwee, Kevin McKidd, Emma Cleasby and Liam Cunningham, the film follows a squad of soldiers fighting to survive an attack by a pack of werewolves during a military training exercise in the Scottish Highlands.

Dog Soldiers was theatrically released in the United Kingdom on 10 May 2002. The film launched Marshall's career as a filmmaker and received positive reviews.

== Plot ==
A couple goes camping in the Scottish Highlands. The woman gives the man a silver letter opener as a present; shortly afterward they are killed in their tent by unseen assailants. Meanwhile, a soldier named Cooper runs through a forest in North Wales. He attacks his pursuers but is overwhelmed and wrestled to the ground. It is revealed that Cooper is trying to join a special forces unit, but when he refuses an order from Captain Richard Ryan to shoot a dog in cold blood, he is rejected and returned to his unit.

Four weeks later, a squad of six British soldiers, including Cooper, are dropped by helicopter into a remote area of the Scottish Highlands to carry out a training exercise against a Special Air Service unit. The following morning, they find the SAS unit's savaged remains. A badly wounded Captain Ryan, the only survivor, makes cryptic references to what attacked them. The troops retreat when unseen assailants begin pursuing them.

While retreating, Corporal Bruce is impaled by a tree branch and killed by his pursuers, and Sergeant Wells is attacked. He is rescued by Cooper and carried to a rural roadside where the group is rescued by Megan, a zoologist who drives them to an isolated house belonging to an unknown family. Soldiers Wells, Cooper, Spoon, Joe, and Terry remain.

As darkness falls under a full moon, the house is surrounded by attackers who are revealed to be werewolves. The survivors try to get in the Land Rover but find it has been destroyed by the werewolves. The soldiers maintain a desperate defence against the creatures, believing that if they can make it to sunrise, the werewolves will revert to human form.

Cooper and Megan treat Wells' wounds. After Terry is abducted and their ammunition runs short, they realize they will not be able to hold out and decide to try to escape. Spoon creates a diversion while Joe steals a Land Rover from the garage and drives up to the house, but he is killed by a werewolf hiding in the back seat.

Under interrogation, Ryan reveals that he was sent on a government mission to capture a live werewolf for study and exploitation as a weapon; Cooper's squad was bait and considered expendable. An enraged Wells and Cooper attempt to kill Ryan, but he transforms into a werewolf and escapes into the forest. It is revealed that the Uath family, the owners of the house, are werewolves.

Using the Land Rover and petrol to create a bomb, the soldiers blow up the barn, where Megan told them the werewolves must be hiding. However, Megan then reveals that there were no werewolves in the barn, that she is a werewolf and a member of the Uath family, and that she unlocked the back door to the house to let the other werewolves in. Before she fully transforms, Wells shoots her in the head. He and Cooper run upstairs, while Spoon fights a werewolf in the kitchen. He gains the upper hand but is killed by a second werewolf.

Wells and Cooper shoot through the floor upstairs to elude the werewolves and drop into the kitchen, where they find Spoon's remains. As he begins to transform into a werewolf, Wells orders Cooper to take shelter in the cellar, where the bodies of the werewolves' victims are stored. Wells gives Cooper a roll of film (from a flash camera used to stun the werewolves) to prove what happened. The werewolves break into the kitchen and confront Wells as he cuts a gas line and blows up the house, seemingly sacrificing himself but killing the werewolves.

As the sun rises, Cooper attempts to leave, but the werewolf Ryan confronts him. After a brutal fight, Cooper stabs Ryan in the chest with the silver letter opener and shoots him in the head. Cooper, along with Megan's Border Collie Sam, emerges from the cellar. Cooper's story, titled "Werewolves ate my platoon!" and accompanied by photographs, appears in a sensationalist tabloid newspaper under the results of the England vs. Germany football match.

== Cast ==
- Sean Pertwee as Sergeant Harry G. Wells
- Kevin McKidd as Private Cooper
- Emma Cleasby as Megan
- Liam Cunningham as Captain Richard Ryan
- Darren Morfitt as Private Phil "Spoon" Witherspoon
- Chris Robson as Private Joe Kirkley
- Leslie Simpson as Private Terry Milburn
- Thomas Lockyer as Corporal Bruce Campbell
- Craig Conway as Male Camper
- Tina Landini as Female Camper

== Production ==
=== Development ===
In 1995, director Neil Marshall pitched to co-producer Keith Bell his idea of a low-budget soldiers-versus-werewolves film. The filmmakers were introduced to the Victor Film Company as a sales agent, who introduced them to producer Christopher Figg. The project was later taken to AFM, where producer David E. Allen became interested in the project after seeing artwork and the script.

Production designer Simon Bowles created models of the house for Marshall to plan and structure where to set up cameras and where characters would run or climb onto the next set. For the exterior set of the house, only the front portion was built early on and is the only part used in the film.

Dog Soldiers was produced by the Kismet Entertainment Group, the Noel Gay Motion Picture Company, the Victor Film Company, and the Carousel Picture Company with the support of the Luxembourg Film Fund. In addition to the credits in the infobox, the costume designer is Uli Simon, the casting directors are Jeremy Zimmerman and Andrea Clarke, the special makeup, animatronic and digital visual effects are by the company Image FX, and the physical-effects supervisor and stunt coordinator is Harry Wiessenhaan. In the United States, the film premiered as a Sci-Fi Pictures telefilm on the Sci-Fi Channel.

The film contains homages to H. G. Wells as well as the films The Evil Dead, Zulu, Aliens, The Matrix and Star Trek II: The Wrath of Khan.

=== Writing ===
Marshall wrote the first draft in 1996. It took six years to refine the script and acquire financing. Marshall wanted the focus to be on the soldiers, with the creatures being an enemy that happens to be werewolves. Marshall wanted to avoid cliches about werewolf curses or "how awful it is to be a werewolf", which Marshall felt was a trope exhaustingly used in many werewolf films.

=== Casting ===
Jason Statham was initially cast as Cooper, but he chose to work with John Carpenter on Ghosts of Mars instead. Simon Pegg was offered the role of Spoon, but he had promised Edgar Wright that Shaun of The Dead would be his first film role.

=== Filming ===
Principal photography was originally scouted and planned to commence in the Isle of Man due to its tax rebates but the idea fell through. Manitoba was later considered as a filming location due to tax reasons but the idea collapsed as well. The film was shot in Luxembourg due to tax deals and having access to crew and student facilities provided by a company based in Luxembourg. Snow affected the set occasionally, which delayed filming schedules.

== Reception ==
On Rotten Tomatoes, the film has an approval rating of 83%, based on 42 reviews, and an average rating of 7.1/10. The site's consensus reads, "Frightening, funny, and packed with action, Dog Soldiers is well worth checking out for genre fans -- and marks writer-director Neil Marshall as a talent to keep an eye on."

Jamie Russell of the BBC gave it 4 out of 5 and called it "A rip-roaring comedy action fest that'll put hairs on your chest." Empire magazine gave it 4 out of 5. Reviewing the 2020 rerelease, The Guardian gave it 3 out of 5 and noted that despite the limitations of the film, the talent shown by Marshall in his debut feature meant that "You can easily draw a clear line through this to his later work". They conclude that "Dog Soldiers has aged pretty well." The film has since gained a cult following.

== Awards ==
In 2002, the film won the Brussels International Festival of Fantasy Film's Golden Raven, the festival's top award, as well as the audience prize, the Pegasus.

== Home media ==
Dog Soldiers was released on DVD in the U.S. in November 2002 by 20th Century Fox Home Entertainment.

A Blu-ray edition (including a single-disc edition and a double-disc edition with a DVD copy) was released by First Look Studios on 5 May 2009, available only in the U.S. and Canada.

Due to the low quality of the original Blu-ray transfer, Shout! Factory worked hand in hand with director Neil Marshall to create a brand-new Blu-ray transfer for Dog Soldiers in a release titled Dog Soldiers: Collector's Edition, which was released on 23 June 2015. It was a two-disc set including a brand-new Blu-ray and a DVD copy with a new cover. This edition is only available in the U.S. (Region A). However, the original negative wasn't located at the time of the making of this release, and Shout! Factory had to rely on two original cinema prints, whose visual qualities are limited.

On 14 March 2019, with the original negative finally located, the German company Koch Media released the movie on video in a package including the movie, restored in 4K from the negative, on DVD, Blu-ray and UHD.

Another 4K restoration was announced by Vertigo Releasing in 2020, with a digital release on 12 October 2020 and a limited edition Blu-ray was slated for release by Second Sight Films following in February 2021 but pushed back to August 2022 when access to the negative was gained and fx shots were interposed.

Second Sight released a limited edition 4K Ultra HD box set in May 2022. as well as a Standard Edition 4K UHD set and a Blu-ray release.

== Sequel ==
Producer David E. Allen said in January 2004 that a sequel, Dog Soldiers: Fresh Meat, would begin a 35-day shoot that April in either Luxembourg or Canada with a budget of $5.5 million. Andy Armstrong, a second-unit director on films including Hellbound: Hellraiser II and Nightbreed, would direct from an Eric Miller script, with Allen and Brian Patrick O’Toole returning as producers. No casting was announced. Allen said the plot would involve Private Cooper being "picked up by an American team who, we find out, were the real opponents for the war games for Sgt. Wells' squad." A year later, he elaborated that, "In the first film, it was a family who were the werewolves. In this one, it's an actual team of werewolves who are true military men. So even though they are now werewolves, they act like a trained military unit."

In January 2005, M. J. Bassett was in talks to direct, but by July 2006, Rob Green, who previously directed the horror film The Bunker, was set to direct and said he and Miller had written a story in which "Some of the characters actually love being a werewolf because they are so powerful – the ultimate killing machine … [I]t's a fun spin on the traditional angle that being a werewolf is a curse which damns the person no matter what. We also have a very savage she-wolf in the climax who faces against the leader of the pack of Dog Soldiers." Production was not set for autumn 2006. By 21 December 2008, however, information about the film had been removed from various web resources including the website of production company Kismet.

A "Little Red Riding Hood"-inspired web series, Dog Soldiers: Legacy, was announced in September 2011 by producer and Kismet vice-president, Allen, now going by D. Eric Allen. A teaser trailer for the series was filmed in northwest Arkansas over the last weekend of August 2011. Directed by Ryan Lightbourn, the trailer included members of Allen's family, including his grandmother Pat "Nan" Allen and his sister Emmy Allen, as Red. Allen also said the Dog Soldiers sequel was in early pre-production.

An early poster of Dog Soldiers: Fresh Meat was released with the tagline "Coming 2014" across the bottom on 23 March 2014. D. Eric Allen announced that a prequel and another sequel are in the planning stages, and Fresh Meat would be released on 20 December 2014. This date passed with no release and no additional updates on the film's status.

Neil Marshall stated in an audio commentary for Dog Soldiers, that the moment in the film when Megan cuts her hand on a shard of glass was meant to be a setup for a second sequel about werewolf DNA, which would complete a planned trilogy. However, he added that the planned sequels will "probably amount to nothing now."

== See also ==
- Battle of Rorke's Drift (mentioned in dialogue as an analogy of the squad's situation)
