= Duchess (film) =

2024 film by Neil Marshall

- Directed by: Neil Marshall
- Written by: Neil Marshall; Charlotte Kirk
- Produced by: Emily Corcoran; Kristyna Sellnerova
- Starring: Charlotte Kirk; Philip Winchester; Colm Meaney; Hoji Fortuna; Stephanie Beacham; Sean Pertwee
- Cinematography: Simon Rowling
- Edited by: Adam Trotman; Neil Marshall
- Music by: Paul Lawler
- Production companies: Cork Films; Ashland Hill Media Finance; Lip Sync; Scarlett Productions Ltd.
- Distributed by: Palisades Park Pictures; Vertigo Films (United Kingdom)
- Release date: 9 August 2024
- Running time: 113 minutes
- Country: United Kingdom
- Language: English
- Box office: $43,355

Duchess is a 2024 British crime film directed by Neil Marshall. It is a revenge action thriller featuring a female protagonist portrayed by Charlotte Kirk. The film had a limited theatrical release and was met with generally negative reviews from critics.

== Plot ==
Scarlett is a low-level thief who, while working as a pickpocket in a nightclub, falls for the suave Rob. Rob, it turns out, is a diamond smuggler working with Danny and Baraka, selling a massive diamond to queen-fence Charlie. Following Rob's death at the hands of his fellow smugglers, Scarlett becomes known as "Duchess", intent on a bloody revenge.

== Cast ==
- Charlotte Kirk as Scarlett (aka Duchess)
- Philip Winchester as Rob
- Sean Pertwee as Danny
- Hoji Fortuna as Baraka
- Colin Egglesfield as Tom
- Stephanie Beacham as Charlie
- Colm Meaney as Frank
- Harvey Dean as Adam
- Mellissa Laycy as Michelle

== Release ==
=== Box office ===
Duchess had a limited release to theatres in August 2024, achieving a box office total of $43,355. It was released to video the same month.

=== Critical reception ===
On the review aggregation website Rotten Tomatoes, 13% of 23 critics' reviews are positive. The website's consensus reads: "Duchess is chauvinism dressed up in women's clothes, but much less exciting". On Metacritic it has a score of 22 out of 100, based on reviews from 5 critics, indicating "generally unfavorable" reviews. Metacritic later listed it as the third worst reviewed movie of 2024.

In a two-star review for The Guardian, critic Leslie Felperin stated that Kirk looks good in Lycra but the film is "tired" and does not engage the audience. Tim Robey, writing for The Telegraph, rated it one out of five and wrote: "The sub-sub-Scarface bursts of bullet-ridden action just about keep this thing from grinding to a halt, but it’s leering, cruddy and retrograde to the bitter end". Brian Tallerico for RogerEbert.com slated the film, stating not only that it is "overlong", but that it also feels "twice as long" again.

Although featuring a female protagonist in the lead role, a review in Screen Rant stated the film "fails to subvert sexist tropes", with its gender politics being less progressive than films from 30-40 years earlier.
