= Batman: Strange Days =

- Poster
- Directed by: Bruce Timm
- Based on: Characters by Bob Kane; Bill Finger
- Starring: Kevin Conroy; Brian George
- Music by: Christopher Drake
- Production companies: DC Entertainment; Warner Bros. Animation
- Release date: April 9, 2014
- Running time: 3 minutes
- Language: English

Batman: Strange Days is a 2014 animated superhero short film based on the popular DC Comics character Batman. Directed by Bruce Timm, it was created to celebrate the 75th anniversary of the conception of the character.

== Plot ==
A young blonde woman is abducted by Dr. Hugo Strange, who intends to use her for an experiment. He has one of his Monster Men bring her to his secret laboratory on a relatively isolated mountain, but they are ambushed by the Dark Knight, who attacks them in order to free the woman. After defeating the Monster Man, Batman turns his attention to Strange, who is holding the woman hostage on the edge of a cliff, and threatens to kill her if Batman comes closer. Batman's sudden move causes him to lose his balance and fall into the abyss. Batman saves the woman from falling as well and the two of them watch as Strange falls to his apparent death.

== Production ==
Bruce Timm stated that Strange Days is the Batman story that he would create if he was "boss of the world." The short was created in black and white and takes place in 1939, the year Batman debuted in the comics.

== Cast ==
- Batman - Kevin Conroy
- Hugo Strange - Brian George
- Woman - Tara Strong
- Monster Man - Bruce Timm

== See also ==
- Chase Me
- Batman: Caped Crusader
