= Batman: Under the Red Hood =

2010 American animated film

- Home video release poster
- Directed by: Brandon Vietti
- Written by: Judd Winick
- Based on: Characters by DC Comics
- Produced by: Bruce Timm; Bobbie Page
- Starring: Bruce Greenwood; Jensen Ackles; John DiMaggio; Neil Patrick Harris; Jason Isaacs; Wade Williams
- Edited by: Margaret Hou
- Music by: Christopher Drake
- Production companies: Warner Premiere; DC Entertainment; Warner Bros. Animation
- Distributed by: Warner Home Video
- Release date: July 27, 2010
- Running time: 75 minutes
- Country: United States
- Language: English

Batman: Under the Red Hood is a 2010 American animated direct-to-video superhero film directed by Brandon Vietti and produced by Warner Premiere, DC Entertainment & Warner Bros. Animation. It was released by Warner Home Video. The film is the eighth film of the DC Universe Animated Original Movies, which is directly derived from the Batman storyline "Under the Hood". In the film, Batman investigates the identity of a vigilante called Red Hood. The voice cast includes Bruce Greenwood and Jensen Ackles as Batman and Red Hood respectively, alongside John DiMaggio, Neil Patrick Harris, Jason Isaacs and Wade Williams.

Batman: Under the Red Hood was released on July 27, 2010, and received critical acclaim from critics with praise for its storytelling and animation. It is generally considered to be one of the best in the DC Universe Animated Original Movies. The film was also a commercial success, grossing over $12 million in home video sales. The two-disc special edition and Blu-ray also includes an animated short featuring Jonah Hex. An interactive short spiritual sequel/film adaptation titled Batman: Death in the Family was released on October 13, 2020.

== Plot ==
Ra's al Ghul hires the Joker as a distraction so that Ra's could destroy Europe's financial districts. He realizes his mistake when he is unable to control Joker, who captures Jason Todd, the second Robin and Batman's partner. In Sarajevo, Bosnia, Joker brutally assaults and tortures Jason in an abandoned warehouse with a crowbar. Joker eventually leaves and locks Jason inside the warehouse with a bomb, which explodes and kills Jason before Batman arrives.

Five years later in Gotham City, a mysterious vigilante called Red Hood assembles a meeting of the city's most prominent drug dealers. He announces a takeover of their drug trade, taking 40 percent of their profit while offering them protection from Black Mask and Batman, but threatens to kill them if anyone is caught dealing drugs to children. Batman stops an attempted theft of a shipment that belonged to Black Mask, which contains the advanced android Amazo. Batman destroys Amazo with the help of Jason's predecessor Dick Grayson, using the name Nightwing, and discovers the thieves are working for Red Hood. The thieves are killed by a sniper shot before they can reveal any more. Batman identifies the shooter as the Red Hood, and chases him to Ace Chemicals. The Red Hood references the creation of the Joker in this same building before blowing up the facility. Batman and Nightwing interrogate Joker at Arkham Asylum about Red Hood, but he denies any involvement.

An infuriated Black Mask puts a hit on Red Hood for Amazo's destruction. Batman and Nightwing prevent Red Hood from hijacking Black Mask's next weapon shipment. They chase Red Hood to a train station, where he escapes after detonating a bomb, which injures Nightwing. As Alfred Pennyworth tends to Nightwing, Batman realizes that the Red Hood is trained and has knowledge of Batman's tactics, gear and his secret identity. Batman recalls Jason performing the same maneuvers as Robin and that Jason grew more violent as he aged.

Black Mask sends the Fearsome Hand of Four to lure Red Hood. They nearly overpower him until Batman helps incapacitate three of them and Red Hood kills the fourth, horrifying Batman. Red Hood explains that he is doing what Batman will not: killing criminals who are not afraid. Batman analyzes a blood sample of Red Hood drawn from the battle and it matches to Jason. After discovering that Jason's corpse is fake, Batman confronts Ra's al Ghul and demands to know the truth. Ra's explains that he felt responsible for Jason's death and, as a peace offering, swapped Jason's body for a fake and revived him in the Lazarus Pit, but following his resurrection, Jason was driven insane and escaped.

After surviving an assassination attempt by Red Hood, Black Mask sets the Joker free, tasking him with killing Red Hood. However, Joker instead abducts Black Mask and the drug dealers and plans to set them on fire. Red Hood appears and reveals his real target is Joker. Batman saves the hostages and Red Hood takes Joker. Red Hood brutally beats Joker in revenge and confronts Batman. Batman and Red Hood fight and Red Hood reveals himself as Jason. Their fight makes its way to the dilapidated building, where Jason is keeping Joker and ends with Jason holding Batman at gunpoint.

Though having forgiven Batman for not saving him, Jason is upset and angry that Joker is still alive after killing him. Batman admits that he considers killing Joker every time he defeats him but will not, fearing he will never be able to stop if he kills even once. Jason tosses Batman a gun and gives him an ultimatum – he will execute Joker unless Batman shoots him. Batman refuses and drops the gun, causing Jason to shoot at Batman. Batman dodges the bullet, throws a Batarang, which jams and destroys Jason's pistol. Jason sets off a time bomb and Batman subdues Joker before attempting to save Jason.

The bomb explodes; Batman and Joker survive, but Jason is gone. Joker is returned to Arkham and Black Mask is arrested. At the Batcave, Alfred offers to remove the glass case display of Jason's Robin costume, but Bruce refuses, claiming it does not change anything. A final flashback shows Jason's first day as Robin, which he cheerfully declares is the best day of his life.

== Cast ==
- Bruce Greenwood as Bruce Wayne / Batman
- Jensen Ackles as Jason Todd / Red Hood
  - Alexander Martella as young Jason Todd
  - Vincent Martella as teen Jason Todd / Robin
- John DiMaggio as Joker (credited) / Red Hood (uncredited)
- Neil Patrick Harris as Dick Grayson / Nightwing
- Jason Isaacs as Ra's al Ghul
- Wade Williams as Roman Sionis / Black Mask
- Jim Piddock as Alfred Pennyworth
- Gary Cole as Commissioner James Gordon (uncredited), Shot (credited)
- Carlos Alazraqui as Chi Chi, Thug #1 (uncredited), Baton (uncredited)
- Robert Clotworthy as Leon
- Brian George as Ra's al Ghul's assistant
- Kelly Hu as Ms. Li
- Phil LaMarr as Rick, Bulk (uncredited)
- Kevin Michael Richardson as Tyler Bramford
- Dwight Schultz as Freddie, Yurp
- Fred Tatasciore as Mercenary #1, Amazo (uncredited), Guard (uncredited)
- Keri Tombazian as Fearsome Hand Leader (uncredited), Reporter #2 (credited)
- Andrea Romano as Reporter #1
- Bruce Timm as Riddler
- Michael Villani as Reporter #3

== Music ==
Batman: Under The Red Hood – Soundtrack to The Animated Original Movie

Film score by Christopher Drake
- Released: July 27, 2010
- Length: 57:24
- Label: WaterTower Music

The score for Batman: Under the Red Hood was composed by Christopher Drake, who had previously scored several animated films set in the DC Universe. It was inspired by the soundtracks of Batman: Mask of the Phantasm which features a traditional orchestral score and The Dark Knight which features a computer generated, electronic score. Drake said that since Under the Red Hood has a darker tone than previous DC Universe animated films, he chose not to use the music as epic and melodramatic instead opting for a more intimate, minimal and restrained tone. He added that this is the first DC film he has scored that didn't rely on using a large choir to make the fight scenes sound bigger. Drake scored the film as a reference to modern minimalist electronic scores because the film's director Brandon Vietti felt that Under the Red Hood needed to go in a different, more modern direction to separate it from previous DC animation scores. At that point, Drake introduced more electronic and ambient elements, like synthesized and processed electronic guitar, while retaining orchestral elements.

Batman: Under the Red Hood – Soundtrack to the Animated Original Movie was released by WaterTower Music on July 27, 2010, and features 18 tracks composed for the film.

Batman: Under the Red Hood – Soundtrack to the Animated Original Movie
No.	Title	Length
1.	"A Death In The Family"	4:51
2.	"Main Titles"	2:42
3.	"Mob Boss Meeting"	1:47
4.	"Amazo"	4:21
5.	"Batwing"	3:15
6.	"Batmobile To Arkham"	0:50
7.	"Interrogation"	1:19
8.	"Rooftop Chase"	4:21
9.	"Flashback"	2:19
10.	"Black Mask Strikes Back"	1:17
11.	"Techno Ninjas"	5:41
12.	"Break Out"	2:14
13.	"Deal With The Devil"	0:48
14.	"Ra's Story"	5:47
15.	"The Bridge"	5:12
16.	"Final Confrontation"	4:44
17.	"The Choice"	2:16
18.	"End Titles"	3:34
Total length:		57:24

== Commercial performance ==
The film grossed over $12 million in domestic home video sales, making it one of the highest grossing DC animated films.

== Critical reception ==
Batman: Under the Red Hood received critical acclaim from critics with praise for the film's direction, animation, emotional weight and voice acting (particularly for Jensen Ackles).

On Rotten Tomatoes, the film has an approval rating of 100% based on reviews from seven critics, with an average rating of a 7.3/10. Demeter's review for The World's Finest stated: "I have to say this really was a damn good film". James Harvey's review on the same website was even more positive, calling it "a mature and faithful take on the Batman lore". IGN awarded it a score of 8 out of 10, calling it "An interesting peek inside the psyche of Batman and the fine line between good and evil". It was the highest rated direct-to-video Batman film until the release of The Dark Knight Returns.

== Continuation ==
A follow-up film titled Batman: Death in the Family was released on October 13, 2020, a decade after Under the Red Hood with Greenwood, Martella, and DiMaggio reprising their roles. Zehra Fazal plays Talia al Ghul and Gary Cole plays both Two-Face and Commissioner Gordon. It is an interactive narrative where the viewer chooses what happens in the story.
