= Batman: The Dark Knight Returns (film) =

2012 American two-part animated film directed by Jay Oliva

- Deluxe Edition release cover art
- Directed by: Jay Oliva
- Written by: Bob Goodman
- Based on: The Dark Knight Returns by: Frank Miller; Klaus Janson
- Starring: Peter Weller; Ariel Winter; David Selby; Wade Williams; Michael Emerson; Mark Valley
- Edited by: Christopher D. Lozinski
- Music by: Christopher Drake
- Production companies: Warner Premiere; DC Entertainment; Warner Bros. Animation; MOI Animation (Animation services)
- Distributed by: Warner Home Video
- Release dates: September 25, 2012 (Part 1); January 29, 2013 (Part 2); October 8, 2013 (Deluxe Edition)
- Running time: 76 minutes (Part 1); 76 minutes (Part 2); 148 minutes (Deluxe Edition)
- Country: United States
- Language: English

Batman: The Dark Knight Returns is an American two-part direct-to-video animated superhero film, an adaptation of the 1986 comic book of the same name by Frank Miller and is set in the same continuity as Batman: Year One. It was directed by Jay Oliva, who worked as a storyboard artist on Man of Steel, Under the Red Hood, Year One and Batman v Superman: Dawn of Justice. Several other Batman veterans were also involved in the film. Part 1 was released on September 25, 2012, and Part 2 was released on January 29, 2013. A deluxe edition combining both films was released on October 8, 2013. Part 1 is the 15th film, and Part 2 is the 16th film, of the DC Universe Animated Original Movies.

== Plot ==
=== Part One ===
After the death of his protégé, Jason Todd, Bruce Wayne retired his Batman persona. Ten years later, in mid-1986, Gotham City is overrun with crime and terrorized by a gang known as the Mutants. The 55-year-old Wayne maintains a friendship with 70-year-old retiring Police Commissioner James Gordon (who knows Wayne was Batman), although he has lost touch with Dick Grayson. At the same time, the Joker has been catatonic in Arkham Asylum since Wayne's retirement. Arkham inmate and former district attorney Harvey Dent undergoes plastic surgery to repair his disfigured face. Although he is declared sane, he quickly goes into hiding following his release. Dent's disappearance, news stories of the crime epidemic, and the memory of his parents' deaths drive Wayne to become Batman once more. He combats crimes and rescues 14-year-old Carrie Kelley, but struggles with the physical limitations of age.

Public reaction to his return is divided. Dent's psychologist, Bartholomew Wolper, blames Batman for creating his own rogues' gallery. Dent resurfaces, threatening to blow up a building unless he is paid a ransom. Batman defeats Dent's henchmen, learning that the bombs will explode, even if the ransom is paid; he realizes that Dent intends to kill himself. Batman disables one bomb, and the other detonates, killing some of Dent's henchmen. He defeats Dent, who reveals that he thinks the reconstructive surgery was botched, as he considers his undamaged half as disfigured. Kelley dresses as Robin and looks for Batman, who attacks a gathering of the Mutants with a tank-like Batmobile, incapacitating most of them. The Mutant leader challenges Batman to a duel, and he accepts to prove that he can win. The Mutant leader, who is in his prime, nearly kills Batman, but Kelley distracts him long enough for Batman to subdue him. The leader and many gang members are arrested. Injured, Batman returns to the Batcave with Kelley and allows her to become his protégée, despite protests from his butler, Alfred Pennyworth.

At the Gotham City Police Department, the Mutant leader murders the mayor during negotiations. Batman has Kelley disguise herself as a Mutant, and she lures the gang to a sewer outlet at the West River. Commissioner Gordon deliberately releases the leader, providing an escape from the building, which leads to the sewer outlet. Before the amassed Mutants, Batman fights the leader in a mud pit; the mud slows the leader, removing his physical advantage, and Batman overpowers him. Seeing their leader's defeat, the Mutants divide into smaller gangs, with one becoming the "Sons of Batman", a violent vigilante group. Batman's victory becomes public, and the city's inhabitants are inspired to stand up against crime. Gordon retires after meeting his anti-Batman successor, Ellen Yindel. In Arkham, televised reports about Batman bring the Joker out of his catatonic state.

=== Part Two ===
In late 1986, feigning remorse for his past, Joker convinces Wolper, who considers the Joker to be his favorite patient, to take him on a talk show to tell his story, and makes plans for his escape with his henchman Abner, who supplies him with mind-controlling lipstick. Meanwhile, Clark Kent, a.k.a. Superman, who works as a government operative in exchange for being allowed to covertly help people, is asked by President Ronald Reagan to end Batman's vigilantism. Framing these events is a growing hostility between the US and the Soviet Union over possession of the island of Corto Maltese. As Batman's continued presence humiliates the national authorities, Commissioner Yindel orders Batman's arrest, and Clark warns Bruce that the government will not tolerate him much longer.

Yindel plans a dual sting to take down both Joker and Batman. Joker makes his talk show appearance on David Endochrine's show as Batman fights with the GCPD on the studio roof; while they fight, on television broadcasting, Joker kills Wolper, after the latter insulted Batman's psychology, gasses everyone in the studio to death, including Endochrine, and escapes. He finds Selina Kyle and uses one of her escorts and his lipstick to take control of a congressional representative, who calls for a nuclear strike on the Corto Maltese before falling to his death. Batman's investigation leads him to Selina, whom he finds bound and dressed like Wonder Woman. Kelley notices cotton candy on the floor, and they realize that Joker is at the fairgrounds for mass murders. There, Kelley fights Abner and he accidentally dies while Batman pursues the Joker. As Batman corners a wounded and partially blinded Joker, he admits to feeling responsible for every murder Joker has committed and intends to kill him. In the ensuing fight, Joker stabs Batman repeatedly, and Batman partially breaks Joker's neck in front of witnesses, rendering him quadriplegic. Joker tells Batman he will be branded a criminal for killing him, then commits suicide by completely breaking his own neck. The GCPD arrives, and Batman, bleeding profusely, fights his way to Kelley and escapes.

Superman deflects a Soviet nuclear missile, but is hit with the blast and badly injured. The detonation creates an electromagnetic pulse that wipes out all electrical equipment in the United States and causes a nuclear winter. As Gotham descends into chaos, Batman, Kelley, and Gordon rally the Sons of Batman, the escaped remnants of the Mutants, and the citizens of Gotham to restore order. Yindel accepts that Batman has become too powerful to take down. While the rest of America is powerless and overrun with crime, Gotham becomes the safest city in the country, embarrassing the President's administration. Frustrated they couldn't bring stability, Superman and troops are sent to finally stop Batman. Batman and Superman agree to meet in Crime Alley.

Superman, remorseful for disregarding Batman throughout the years, asks him not to go through with the fight. Wearing a powerful exoframe and backed by Kelley and a now-amputated former superhero, Oliver Queen, Batman fights Superman, using various tactics to make the fight even and banking on Superman feeling the after-effects of the nuclear missile explosion and lack of sunlight. When Superman gains the advantage, Queen hits him with an arrow made with synthetic Kryptonite, severely weakening him. Batman brutally beats Superman, claiming that he intentionally made the Kryptonite weak, and tells Superman never to forget that Batman could have killed him whenever he wanted. Batman then apparently dies of a heart attack, while Wayne Manor self-destructs, and Alfred dies of a stroke. Superman holds Batman's body and angrily orders the soldiers to stand down.

In the aftermath, the world learns that Bruce was Batman; all his secrets are destroyed with the manor, and his finances disappear. As Superman leaves Wayne's funeral, he gives Kelley a knowing wink after hearing a faint heartbeat from Bruce's coffin. In a cave, Bruce is revealed to have faked his death to make preparations to continue his mission more discreetly, allied with Kelley, Queen, and his followers.

== Voice cast ==
=== Part 1 ===
- Peter Weller as Bruce Wayne / Batman
- Ariel Winter as Carrie Kelley / Robin
- David Selby as Commissioner James Gordon
- Wade Williams as Harvey Dent / Two-Face
- Michael Emerson as The Joker
- Carlos Alazraqui as Hernando
- Dee Bradley Baker as Don, Bakery Owner, Mutant in Yellow Jacket
- Maria Canals-Barrera as Commissioner Ellen Yindel
- Paget Brewster as Lana Lang
- Cathy Cavadini as Joanie
- Townsend Coleman as Morrie
- Grey DeLisle as Anchorwoman Carla
- Richard Doyle as The Mayor of Gotham City
- Greg Eagles as Mackie
- Michael Jackson as Alfred Pennyworth
- Danny Jacobs as Merkel
- Maurice LaMarche as Anchor Tom, Dr. Herbert Willing
- Yuri Lowenthal as The Sons of Batman, Rookie Police Officer, Additional Voices
- Michael McKean as Dr. Bartholomew Wolper
- Sam McMurray as Anchor Ted
- Jim Meskimen as General Briggs
- Rob Paulsen as Rob, Robber
- Andrea Romano as Woman
- Tara Strong as Michelle, Anchor Trish, Kevin Ridley, Young Bruce Wayne
- James Patrick Stuart as Murray
- Gary Anthony Sturgis as Silk
- James Arnold Taylor as Mr. Hudson, Store Owner, Spud, Additional Voices
- Bruce Timm as Thomas Wayne
- Jim Ward as Femur's Lawyer
- Frank Welker as Deputy Mayor Stevenson, Weatherman
- Gary Anthony Williams as Mutant Leader, Anchor Bill
- Jim Wise as Femur
- Gwendoline Yeo as Lola Chang

=== Part 2 ===
- Peter Weller as Bruce Wayne / Batman
- Ariel Winter as Carrie Kelley / Robin
- David Selby as James Gordon
- Michael Emerson as The Joker
- Mark Valley as Clark Kent / Superman
- Carlos Alazraqui as Congressman Noches
- Dee Bradley Baker as Don
- Maria Canals-Barrera as Commissioner Ellen Yindel
- Paget Brewster as Lana Lang
- Townsend Coleman as Morrie, Abner
- Grey DeLisle as Anchorwoman Carla
- Robin Atkin Downes as Oliver Queen
- Greg Eagles as Ben Derrick
- Michael Jackson as Alfred Pennyworth
- Danny Jacobs as Merkel
- Maurice LaMarche as Anchor Tom
- Lex Lang as a rescued man
- Tress MacNeille as Selina Kyle, Bruno, Bruce Wayne's Old Lady disguise
- Michael McKean as Dr. Bartholomew Wolper
- Jim Meskimen as President Ronald Reagan
- Jason C. Miller as an Axe-Wielding Firefighter, Liquor Store Owner
- Conan O'Brien as David Endochrine
- Rob Paulsen as Rob
- Andrea Romano as Woman #2
- Tara Strong as Michelle, Anchor Trish, Elsie, Kid
- James Patrick Stuart as Voice Over Radio, Governor Mahoney
- Bruce Timm as a Firefighter by the Hydrant
- Frank Welker as Mayor Stevenson, Frank, Lt. O'Halloran
- Gary Anthony Williams as Anchor Bill
- Gwendoline Yeo as Lola Chang
- Andy Richter as Frank

== Music ==
Christopher Drake, veteran DC Animated Universe composer, scored both parts of the film. A deluxe two-disc edition soundtrack was released on October 8, 2013, to coincide with the deluxe version of the film.

== Reception ==
=== Sales ===
Part 1 earned $5,993,747 from domestic home video sales, while Part 2 earned $4,283,741, which bought total home video earnings to $10,277,488.

=== Critical response ===
Rotten Tomatoes gives Part 1 a score of 100% based on reviews from six critics, with an average rating of 7.9/10.

IGN reviewer Joey Esposito gave Part 1 a score of 7.5 out of 10, praising the voice performances and animation. Esposito noted that the newscasters' segments do not translate well to the screen and lack the impact that they had exhibited in the comic, making them extraneous at best. He also criticized Batman's inner monologue and the poor quality of the DVD extras. Esposito went on to give Part 2 a score of 8.6 out of 10, praising Michael Emerson's portrayal of the Joker, as well as an improvement in Blu-ray extras. Gil Kellerman of Collider praised Part 1 overall, praising Weller's portrayal of Batman but also denigrating the DVD extras. Spencer Perry at SuperHeroHype considers Part 1 to be "one of the best Batman films ever made", scoring it nine out of ten. Noel Murray of The A.V. Club gave Part 1 a grade B+, saying that "there are ways in which the animated Dark Knight Returns gets across Miller's vision even better than the comics page did".

Kofi Outlaw of Screen Rant gave Part 2 three out of five stars, criticizing the outdated Cold War subplot as "a major distraction from an otherwise focused narrative", as well as the toning down of the Joker's character. He went on to say that "The film is a lovingly faithful recreation of the story that spawned it – for better or for worse, depending on the viewer."

=== Accolades ===
Part 1 received a Golden Reel Awards nomination for Best Sound Editing in Direct to Video Animation.
