= Bruce Timm =

American artist, character designer, animator (born 1961)

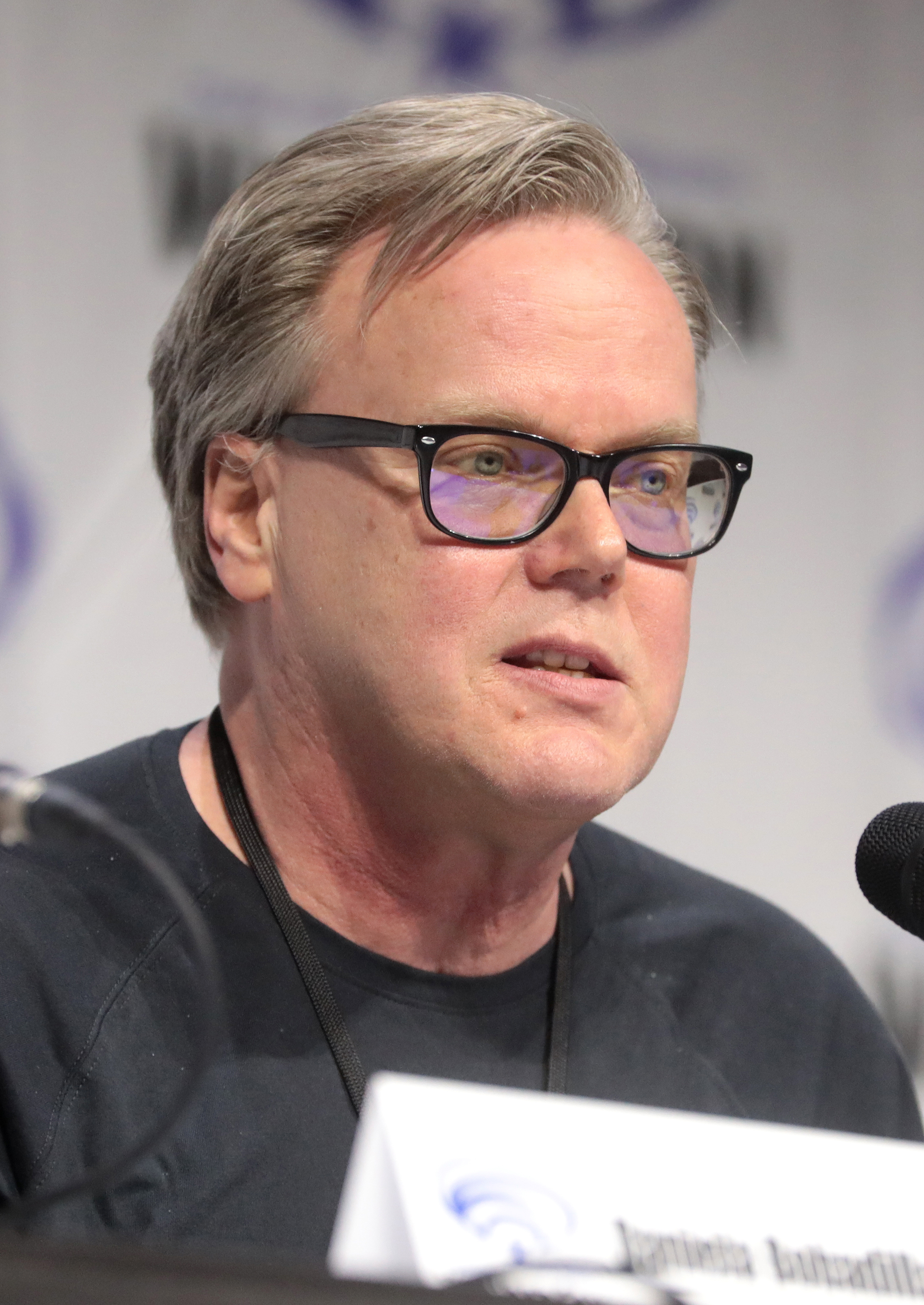
- Timm at the 2019 WonderCon
- Born: Bruce Walter Timm; February 5, 1961 (age 65) Oklahoma, U.S.
- Areas: Artist, animator, writer, producer, director, voice actor
- Notable works: Batman: The Animated Series (1992–1995); Batman: Mask of the Phantasm (1993); Superman: The Animated Series (1996–2000); Batman Beyond (1999–2001); Justice League (2001–2004); Justice League Unlimited (2004–2006)
- Awards: Inkpot Award (2013)
- Children: 1

Bruce Walter Timm (born February 5, 1961) is an American artist, animator, writer, producer, and director. He is best known for contributing to building the modern DC Comics animated franchise, most notably as the head producer behind Batman: The Animated Series (1992–1995), Superman: The Animated Series (1996–2000), The New Batman Adventures (1997–1999), Batman Beyond (1999–2001), Justice League (2001–2004), and Justice League Unlimited (2004–2006).

He also co-created Freakazoid! (1995–1997) alongside Paul Dini and developed Green Lantern: The Animated Series (2012–2013). Following the conclusion of the DCAU, Timm went on to produce several DC animated films under the DC Universe Animated Original Movies line, such as Wonder Woman (2009), Batman: Under the Red Hood (2010), Superman/Batman: Apocalypse (2010), Justice League Doom (2012), Superman vs The Elite (2012), The Dark Knight Returns (2013) and Justice League: Gods and Monsters (2015).

Outside of animation, Timm has also drawn and written several comic books. Timm and Dini collaborated on The Batman Adventures: Mad Love, which told the origin story of Harley Quinn and won the Eisner Award for Best Single Story in 1994.

== Early life ==
Bruce Timm was born on February 5, 1961, in Oklahoma, the third of four brothers. His father was an engineer and his mother worked for the phone company. Timm's family first moved to Ohio when Timm was two years old, and then to California when Timm was five or six.

Timm began drawing from a young age and developed a serious interest in comics around age 12 or 13. His first exposure to superhero media was the 1960s Batman television series. Timm went to college for only one year before dropping out due to bad grades. After dropping out, he began working full-time at Kmart until he saw a Filmation ad inviting new artists to take a layout test. Timm applied in mid-1980, but wasn't offered the job and went back to working for Kmart. The next year, Filmation began hiring again. Timm passed the layout test on his second try and from that point on began working in animation.

== Career ==
=== Animation ===
==== 1985–1989 ====
Timm's early career in animation started at Filmation, working on the layout of Blackstar, Flash Gordon, He-Man and the Masters of the Universe, its spin-off She-Ra: Princess of Power, and The Lone Ranger. He also did background work on G.I. Joe. He also worked for numerous other employers, including Ralph Bakshi and Don Bluth Productions, and attempted to find work at Marvel Comics and DC Comics, but was unsuccessful. During an animators strike in 1982, Timm found himself out of work and went back to Kmart for about half a year, before being hired by Don Bluth to help work on The Secret of NIMH. In 1987, he was hired by John Kricfalusi to do layouts for Mighty Mouse: The New Adventures, which Timm called "artistically and creatively the most fulfilling job that I'd had in the animation business". He worked at DIC Entertainment on The Real Ghostbusters for one season in 1988, then joined Warner Bros. in 1989. At Warner, Timm worked on Tiny Toon Adventures.

==== 1992–2006 ====
Timm was one of the creators and producers of the animated series based on various DC Comics superheroes, known as the DC Animated Universe. The DCAU has also named the "Timmverse" or "Diniverse", after both him and Paul Dini, a writer and producer.

Along with his Tiny Toons partner Eric Radomski, Timm co-created and produced the Emmy Award-winning Batman: The Animated Series, which premiered on September 5, 1992, through which he and Dini co-created the character of Harley Quinn. Timm created virtually all the original character designs for Batman: The Animated Series himself, with the exceptions of Mr. Freeze and the Riddler, who were designed by Mike Mignola, and the characters Man-Bat and the Mad Hatter, who were designed by Kevin Nowlan.

After the success of Batman: The Animated Series, Timm went on to co-create and produce Superman: The Animated Series (premiered in September 1996), The New Batman Adventures (premiered in September 1997), and Batman Beyond (premiered in January 1999), through which he and Dini co-created Terry McGinnis, the teenage Batman of the future, and his supporting cast. He also served as producer on the feature-length Batman Beyond: Return of the Joker (2000) before taking the helm as creator and producer of the animated version of Justice League, which debuted in November 2001; the series continued in the form of Justice League Unlimited in July 2004. Timm was also the producer and creator of Green Lantern: The Animated Series (premiered in November 2011). Along with Dini he created the animated series Freakazoid! (premiered in September 1995).

He shared character designer duties on Superman: The Animated Series and Justice League with James Tucker.

==== 2008–present ====
The 2008 project Batman: Gotham Knight is a departure from the "Timmverse" style, with Timm in a producer role collaborating with Japanese animators on a direct-to-DVD anthology that takes place between the live-action Batman Begins (2005) and The Dark Knight (2008) films. In 2013, following the release of The Dark Knight Returns animated feature, Timm stepped down as DC animation supervising producer; James Tucker was named as his replacement. Timm still works at Warner Brothers, and executive produced the DC Universe Original Animated Movies Justice League: Gods and Monsters (2015) and Batman: The Killing Joke (2016), and series Justice League: Gods and Monsters Chronicles (2015). He was a writer and executive producer for Batman and Harley Quinn (2017).

Timm worked with Man of Steel director Zack Snyder in creating a 75th anniversary short of Superman in 2013. In 2014, he released Batman: Strange Days, an animated short celebrating the 75th anniversary of Batman and an homage to one of Hugo Strange's first appearances in the comic books.

During DC FanDome 2021, Timm was announced to be executive producing a new Batman animated series titled Batman: Caped Crusader alongside J. J. Abrams and Matt Reeves. Comparing the new series to Batman: The Animated Series, Timm stated, "There were certain limitations on what we could do in terms of adult content; in terms of violence and adult themes. My idea is basically to say, 'OK, it's 1990 again, I get to do what I want to do this time, and I got JJ and Matt backing me up.'"

==== Acting ====
Timm has played several characters in the animated series he has been involved in. His cameos include the 1992 episode of Batman: The Animated Series, "Beware the Gray Ghost", playing the toy shop owner, as himself in the 1997 episode of The New Batman Adventures, "Holiday Knights", and as the leader of the Jokerz gang in Batman Beyond, which he joked he did under duress and was "Emmy Award-winning material". He subsequently appeared in an animated form in the 2009 episode of Batman: The Brave and the Bold, "Legends of the Dark Mite", in a comic book convention parody scene, in which he wore Joker's costume, alongside Paul Dini in Harley Quinn's costume. He played a guard in the 2000 direct-to-video animated film Batman Beyond: Return of the Joker.

Timm made a cameo appearance in the 2009 film Green Lantern: First Flight as Bug Boy. He played The Riddler in the 2010 film Batman: Under the Red Hood and appeared as Galius Zed in the 2011 film Green Lantern: Emerald Knights.

=== Comics ===
Harley Quinn (concept by Paul Dini) illustrated by Timm.

Outside of his work in animation, Timm's first ambition was to become a comic-book artist and has thus produced several one-shots and miniseries, mostly for DC Comics. His earliest comic book work was drawing He-Man and other Masters of the Universe mini-comics that would be packaged with Mattel toys in the 1980s.

In 1994, Timm and writer Paul Dini won both the Eisner Award for Best Single Story and the Harvey Award for Best Single Issue or Story for Batman Adventures: Mad Love. Timm won the same Eisner prize the next year as well, for Batman Adventures Holiday Special, (a one-shot with several Christmas-themed stories) with Dini, Ronnie del Carmen, and others. Later, Timm was involved with Batman Adventures and has also worked on Avengers and Vampirella.

In 2000, he did the art for an issue of DC's Vertigo imprint horror title, Flinch.

Timm co-created Harley Quinn (with Dini), working from Dini's original design. Harley's popularity on television led to her inclusion in the mainstream DC Universe. In 2004, Timm and Dini (assisted by Shane Glines as inker) released a three-issue Harley and Ivy miniseries, which was in the works for years.

Timm also drew the 1999 Avengers 1½ special for Marvel Comics, written by Roger Stern. In 2005, he contributed artwork for two comics. One was a short story in Conan #18, titled "Conan's Favorite Joke". The other was a Black Canary short story in Birds of Prey #86. Timm provided the art work for a short two-page Harley Quinn origin story for Dini's Countdown in 2008.

Timm was featured in "Conan Gets Animated", a skit in the December 9, 2010, episode of the TBS late night talk show Conan, in which host Conan O'Brien enlisted his help in designing a new superhero, based on O'Brien's specifications. The superhero, who was designed to resemble O'Brien, included a typically muscular superhero body and costume with chest insignia, as well as idiosyncrasies such as an oven mitt, a jai alai glove, golf shoes, sock garters, and fishnet stockings. One month later, O'Brien aired a clip on his show in which the character, named "The Flaming C", appears in Young Justice.

In 2013, Timm provided the cover artwork for Adventures of Superman #4.

== Art books ==
In 2012, Timm released a book of erotic art, "Naughty and Nice: The Good Girl Art of Bruce Timm," showcasing more than 300 pencil, line, and full color erotic drawings of women. In 2020, he released another book of erotic art, "The Big Tease: A Naughty and Nice Collection," showcasing more than 208 pencil, line, and full color erotic drawings of women. In 2026, he released a book of horror art, "Fiendish Monsters: The Horror Art of Bruce Timm".

== Drawing style and influences ==
Timm's minimalist, angular style is heavily based in his love of 1950s- and 1960s-era comics and Art Deco architecture style. He is also self-taught, having never received any formal art schooling. Timm lists his artistic influences as Jack Kirby, Harvey Kurtzman, Jim Steranko, John Buscema, Wally Wood, Frank Frazetta, Dan DeCarlo, and Alex Toth.

== Personal life ==
Timm is married to his wife, Marta. They have one daughter.

== Filmography ==
=== Film, as writer ===
Year	Title	Credited as			Network
Year	Title	Writer	Producer	Developer	Network
1993	Batman: Mask of the Phantasm	No	Yes		Warner Bros.
2000	Batman Beyond: Return of the Joker	No	Yes		Warner Bros.
2007	Superman: Doomsday	No	Yes	No	Warner Bros.
2008	Justice League: The New Frontier	No	Yes	No	Warner Bros.
2008	Batman: Gotham Knight	No	Yes	No	Warner Bros.
2009	Wonder Woman	No	Yes	No	Warner Bros.
2009	Green Lantern: First Flight	No	Yes	No	Warner Bros.
2009	Superman/Batman: Public Enemies	No	Yes	No	Warner Bros.
2010	Justice League: Crisis on Two Earths	No	Yes	No	Warner Bros.
2010	DC Showcase: The Spectre	No	Yes	No	Warner Bros.
2010	Batman: Under the Red Hood	No	Yes	No	Warner Bros.
2010	DC Showcase: Jonah Hex	No	Yes	No	Warner Bros.
2010	DC Showcase: Green Arrow	No	Yes	No	Warner Bros.
2010	Superman/Batman: Apocalypse	No	Yes	No	Warner Bros.
2010	Superman/Shazam!: The Return of Black Adam	No	Yes	No	Warner Bros.
2011	All-Star Superman	No	Yes	No	Warner Bros.
2011	Green Lantern: Emerald Knights	No	Yes	No	Warner Bros.
2011	Batman: Year One	No	Yes	No	Warner Bros.
2011	DC Showcase: Catwoman	No	Yes	No	Warner Bros.
2012	Justice League: Doom	No	Yes	No	Warner Bros.
2012	Superman vs The Elite	No	Yes	No	Warner Bros.
2012	The Dark Knight Returns Part 1	No	Yes	No	Warner Bros.
2012	The Dark Knight Returns Part 2	No	Yes	No	Warner Bros.
2014	Batman: Strange Days	No	Yes	No	Warner Bros.
2015	Justice League: Gods and Monsters	Yes			Warner Bros.
2016	Batman: The Killing Joke	No	Yes	No	Warner Bros.
2017	Batman and Harley Quinn	Yes		No	Warner Bros.
2016	Batman: Gotham by Gaslight	No	Yes	No	Warner Bros.
2019	Justice League vs. the Fatal Five	No	Yes	No	Warner Bros.
2019	DC Showcase: Sgt. Rock	No	Yes		Warner Bros.
2020	Superman: Red Son	No	Yes	No	Warner Bros.
2020	DC Showcase: The Phantom Stranger	No	Yes		Warner Bros.
2021	Batman: Soul of the Dragon	No	Yes	No	Warner Bros.

=== Television, as writer ===
Year	Title	Credited as				Network
Year	Title	Writer	Producer	Developer	Showrunner	Network
1992–1995	Batman: The Animated Series	Yes				Fox Kids
1995–1997	Freakazoid!	No		Yes		Fox Kids
1996–2000	Superman: The Animated Series	No	Yes			Kids' WB
1997–1999	The New Batman Adventures	No	Yes			Kids' WB
1999–2001	Batman Beyond	No	Yes			Kids' WB
2001–2004	Justice League	Yes				Cartoon Network
2004–2006	Justice League Unlimited	Yes				Cartoon Network
2011–2013	Green Lantern: The Animated Series	No	Yes			Cartoon Network
2024–present	Batman: Caped Crusader	Yes				Amazon Prime Video

=== Film ===
List of voice performances in films
Year	Title	Role	Notes	Ref.
2000	Batman Beyond: Return of the Joker	Guard	Direct-to-video	
2009	Wonder Woman	Attacker	Direct-to-video	
2009	Green Lantern: First Flight	Bug Boy	Direct-to-video	
2009	Superman/Batman: Public Enemies	Mongul	Direct-to-video	
2010	Justice League: Crisis on Two Earths	Uncle Super (credited) / Captain Super Jr. (uncredited)	Direct-to-video	
2010	Batman: Under the Red Hood	The Riddler	Direct-to-video	
2011	Green Lantern: Emerald Knights	Galius Zed	Direct-to-video	
2012	Justice League: Doom	Ace	Direct-to-video	
2012	Superman vs. The Elite	MI-5 Agent	Direct-to-video	
2012	The Dark Knight Returns Part 1	Thomas Wayne	Direct-to-video	
2016	Batman: The Killing Joke	Patrolman	Theatrical release	
2017	Batman and Harley Quinn	Michael J. Carter / Booster Gold	Direct-to-video	
2018	Batman: Gotham by Gaslight	Arkham Radio Man	Direct-to-video	
2019	Justice League vs. the Fatal Five	Two-Face	Direct-to-video	

=== Television ===
List of voice performances in television series
Year	Title	Role	Notes	Ref.
1992–1993	Batman: The Animated Series	Red / The Mad Bomber / Ted Dymer	2 episodes	
1999–2001	Batman Beyond	J-Man / Jokerz Leader / Top Hat Joker	5 episodes	
2003	Justice League	Soldier	Episode: "The Terror Beyond"	
2004	Justice League Unlimited	Solomon Grundy / Stew / Husband (uncredited)	2 episodes	

== Bibliography ==
Dark Horse Comics

- Madman #6 (1995)
- Adventures of the Mask #1–6 (1996)
- He-Man & The Masters of the Universe: Minicomic Collection #1–2 (2015)

DC Comics

- The Batman Adventures #12 (1993)
- Batman: Mask of the Phantasm – The Animated Movie (1993)
- The Batman Adventures: Mad Love (1994)
- The Batman Adventures Holiday Special #1 (1995)
- Batman Black and White #1 (1996)
- Superman Adventures #1 (1996)
- Adventures in the DC Universe #3 (1997)
- Gen 13 Bootleg #18 (1998)
- Batman Beyond #1, 5 (1999)
- Harley and Ivy #1–3 (2004)
- The Spirit #15–16, 22 (2008)
- Adventures of Superman #11–13 (2013)
- Harley Quinn #0, 14, 23 (2014–2016)

Art of Fiction

- All Crime Comics #1–2 (2013)

Eternity Comics

- Ex-Mutants: The Shattered Earth Chronicles #4 (1988)
- The Trouble with Girls #7, 11 (1988)

Flesk Publications

- Naughty and Nice: The Good Girl Art Of Bruce Timm (2012)
- The Big Tease: A "Naughty and Nice" Collection (2020)
- Fiendish Monsters: The Horror Art of Bruce Timm (2026)

Image Comics

- Savage Dragon #100 (2002)
- Giant-Size Kung Fu Bible Stories (2014)

Pied Paper

- The New Humans #1, 5 (1987–1988)

Dynamite Entertainment

- Vampirella: Master Series #3–4 (2011)

Marvel Comics

- All-New X-Men #25 (2014)
- Avengers (Vol. 1) #1½ (penciler, inker and colorist) (1999)
- Captain America (Vol. 3) #50 (penciler, with John Romita Sr., Tom Palmer, Ron Frenz, Sal Buscema and Rick Veitch) (2002)
- Captain America: Red, White & Blue #1 (2002)
- Fantastic Four: The World's Greatest Comics Magazine #1 (penciler and cover artist), #3–4, #7–9 (cover artist), #10 (writer and cover artist) (2001)
- Marvel 75th Anniversary Celebration (Captain America) (2014)

TwoMorrows Publishing

- Back Issue! #17, 99 (2006–2017)

First Comics

- Whisper #13–16, 22–23, 25 (1988–1989)
- Twilight Man #1–4 (1989)

H. H. Windsor

- Masters of the Universe minicomic #25, 30, 32–35, 39, 42–44, 48–49 (1984–1986)

== Accolades ==
- Eisner and Harvey Award in 1994 for The Batman Adventures: Mad Love; an Eisner for Batman Adventures Holiday Special in 1995.
- Winsor McCay Award in 2009.
- Inkpot Award in 2013.

== Sources ==
- Nolen-Weathington, Eric (2004). Modern Masters Volume 3: Bruce Timm. Raleigh, North Carolina: TwoMorrows Publishing. ISBN 1-893905-30-6.
