= Neil Marshall =

English filmmaker

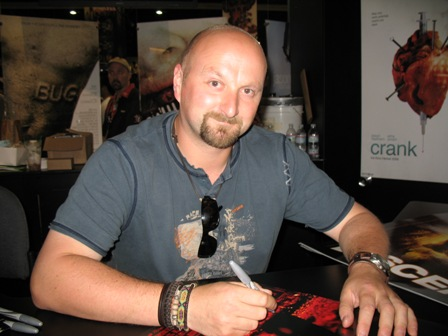
- Marshall at the 2006 San Diego Comic-Con
- Born: 25 May 1970 (age 56); Newcastle upon Tyne, England
- Occupations: Director; editor; producer; screenwriter
- Years active: 1989–present
- Spouse: Axelle Carolyn (m. 2007; div. 2016)
- Website: neilmarshalldirector.com

Neil Marshall (born 25 May 1970) is an English film and television director, editor, producer, and screenwriter. He directed the horror films Dog Soldiers (2002) and The Descent (2005), the science fiction action film Doomsday (2008), the historical war film Centurion (2010), the superhero horror film Hellboy (2019), and the adventure horror film The Reckoning (2020).

Marshall has also directed numerous television series, including two episodes of the HBO fantasy drama series Game of Thrones: "Blackwater" and "The Watchers on the Wall", the latter of which earned him a nomination for the Primetime Emmy Award for Outstanding Directing for a Drama Series.

== Early life ==
Marshall was born in Newcastle upon Tyne, England. He was inspired to become a film director when he saw Raiders of the Lost Ark (1981) at the age of eleven. He began making home movies using Super 8 mm film, and in 1989, he attended film school at Newcastle Polytechnic. In the next eight years, he worked as a freelance film editor.

== Career ==
In 1995, he was hired to co-write and edit for director Bharat Nalluri's first film, Killing Time. Marshall continued to write and develop his own projects, directing his first film in 2002, Dog Soldiers, a horror film that became a cult film in the United Kingdom and the United States. In 2005, he followed up with a second horror film, The Descent. With his direction of The Descent, he was identified as a member of the Splat Pack. Marshall won the British Independent Film Award for Best Director, and the film received the Saturn Award for Best Horror Film.

His next film, Doomsday, is a 2008 science fiction action film he wrote and directed. The film takes place in the future in Scotland, which has been quarantined because of a deadly virus. When the virus is found in London, political leaders send a team led by Major Eden Sinclair (Rhona Mitra) to Scotland to find a possible cure. Sinclair's team runs into two types of survivors: marauders and medieval knights.

Doomsday was conceived by Marshall based on the idea of futuristic soldiers facing medieval knights. In producing the film, he drew inspiration from various movies, including Mad Max, Escape from New York and 28 Days Later. Marshall had a budget three times the size of his previous two films. The director filmed the larger-scale Doomsday in Scotland and South Africa. The film was released on 14 March 2008 in the United States and Canada and in the United Kingdom on 9 May 2008. Doomsday did not perform well at the box office, and critics gave the film mixed reviews. Rotten Tomatoes reported that 49% of critics gave the film positive write-ups, based on a sample of 69, with an average score of 5.1/10. At Metacritic, which assigns a normalised rating out of 100 to reviews from mainstream critics, the film has received an average score of 51, based on 14 reviews.

Marshall went on to write and direct the 2010 historical war film Centurion, starring Michael Fassbender and Dominic West. He also wrote and directed a segment, titled "Bad Seed", of the anthology horror film Tales of Halloween, which had its world premiere on 24 July 2015 at the Fantasia International Film Festival.

Marshall directed episodes of several television series, including Black Sails, Constantine, Hannibal, Westworld, Timeless, and Lost in Space, the lattermost two of which he also executive produced. He was nominated for a Primetime Emmy Award for Outstanding Directing for a Drama Series for his work on the Game of Thrones episode "The Watchers on the Wall". In February 2015, Marshall and his agent Marc Helwig founded the television production company Applebox Entertainment and signed with this company, a two-year deal with Legendary TV.

In 2017, Marshall signed on to direct a reboot of Hellboy, released in April 2019. Marshall has since disowned the film, criticizing the script and calling the job "the worst professional experience of my life." Marshall only accepted the film due to not making a feature film in nine years and also being initially intrigued by the horror pitch.

He then wrote and directed the horror film The Reckoning, which was released in 2020. He created a production company, Scarlett Productions, with actress Charlotte Kirk.

Marshall signed with Verve, an agency, in November 2019. In late August 2020, Verve dropped Marshall without comment. As of August 2020, Marshall is still signed with Artists First, a management firm.

== Personal life ==
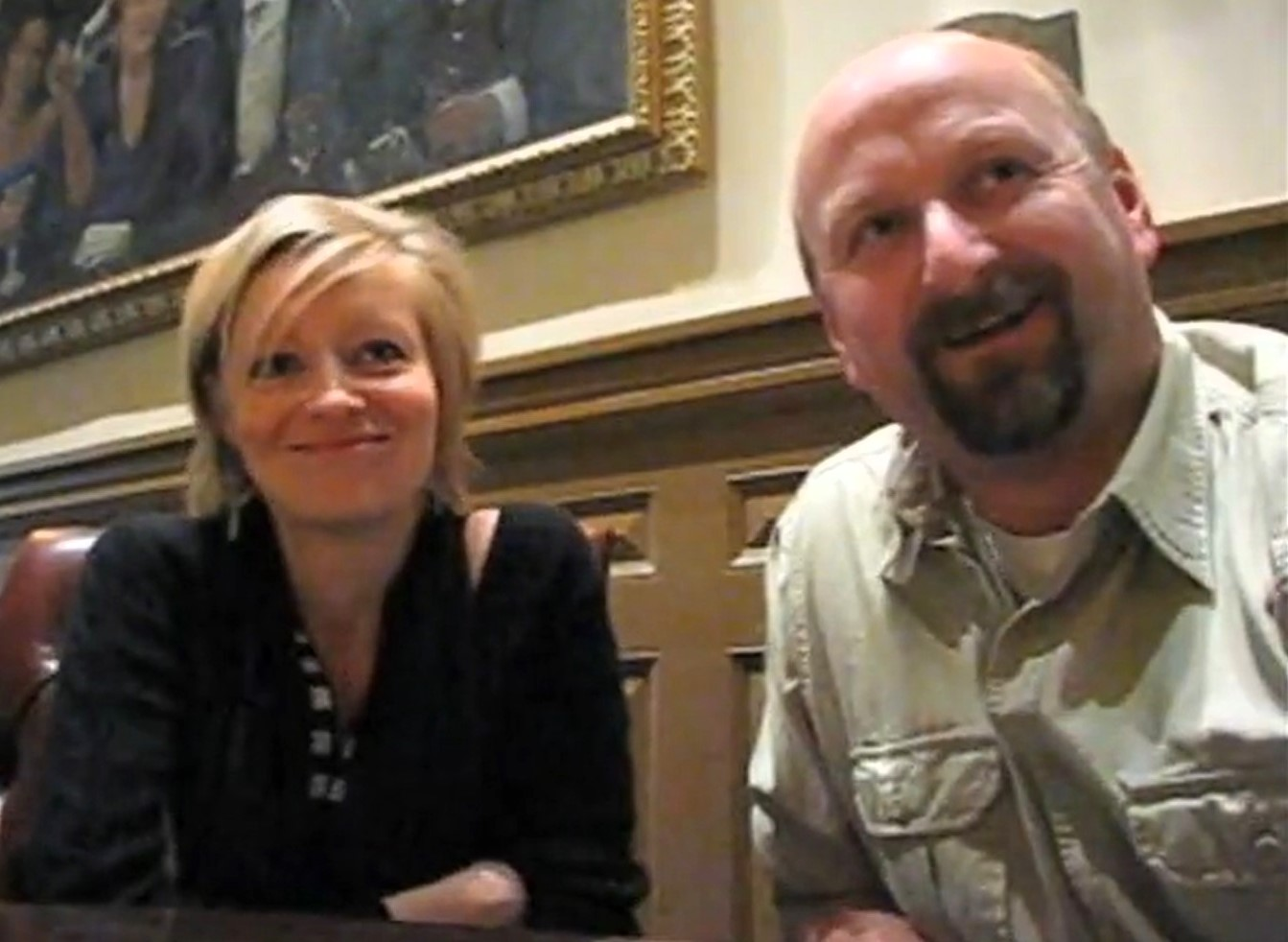
Marshall with Axelle Carolyn in 2010

Marshall was married to the Belgian film director Axelle Carolyn from 2007 to 2016; both acted in Centurion. As of August 2020, he was engaged to the British actress Charlotte Kirk.

== Filmography ==
=== Film ===
Year	Title	Director	Writer	Executive Producer	Editor	Notes
1998	Killing Time	No	Yes	No	Yes	
2002	Dog Soldiers	Yes	Yes	No	Yes	
2005	The Descent	Yes	Yes	No	No	
2008	Doomsday	Yes	Yes	No	Yes	
2010	Centurion	Yes	Yes	No	No	
2015	Tales of Halloween	Yes	Yes	No	No	Segment: "Bad Seed"
2019	Hellboy	Yes	No	No	No	
2020	The Reckoning	Yes	Yes	Yes	Yes	
2022	The Lair	Yes	Yes	Yes	Yes	
2024	Duchess	Yes	Yes	Yes	Yes	
2024	Compulsion	Yes	Yes	Yes	No	

Executive producer only

- The Descent Part 2 (2009)
- Soulmate (2013)
- Dark Signal (2016)

=== Television ===
Year	Title	Director	Executive Producer	Notes
2012, 2014	Game of Thrones	Yes	No	Episodes "Blackwater" and "The Watchers on the Wall"
2014	Black Sails	Yes	No	Episodes "I." and "III."
2014	Constantine	Yes	No	Episodes "Non Est Asylum" and "Rage of Caliban"
2015	Hannibal	Yes	No	Episode "The Great Red Dragon"
2016	Poor Richard's Almanack	Yes	Yes	Episode "Pilot"
2016	Timeless	Yes	Yes	Episodes "Pilot" and "The Assassination of Abraham Lincoln"
2016	Westworld	Yes	No	Episode "The Stray"
2018	Lost in Space	Yes	Yes	Episodes "Impact" and "Diamonds in the Sky"

Writer

- Dog Soldiers: Legacy (2011) (Pilot episode)

== Awards and nominations ==
Year	Association	Category	Work	Result
2006	British Independent Film Awards	Best Director	The Descent	Won
2006	Saturn Awards	Best Horror Film	The Descent	Won
2013	Hugo Awards	Best Dramatic Presentation, Short Form	Game of Thrones	Won
2014	Primetime Emmy Awards	Outstanding Directing for a Drama Series	Game of Thrones	Nominated
2020	Golden Raspberry Awards	Worst Director	Hellboy	Nominated
