= Doomsday (2008 film) =

2008 film by Neil Marshall

- Theatrical release poster
- Directed by: Neil Marshall
- Written by: Neil Marshall
- Produced by: Benedict Carver; Steven Paul
- Starring: Rhona Mitra; Bob Hoskins; Adrian Lester; David O'Hara; Malcolm McDowell
- Cinematography: Sam McCurdy
- Edited by: Andrew MacRitchie
- Music by: Tyler Bates
- Production companies: Rogue Pictures; Crystal Sky Pictures; Intrepid Pictures; Scion Films
- Distributed by: Universal Pictures (United States, United Kingdom, Australia, New Zealand, Spain and Latin America); Concorde Filmverleih (Germany); Ster-Kinekor (South Africa)
- Release dates: 14 March 2008 (United States); 9 May 2008 (United Kingdom)
- Running time: 105 minutes (United States); 113 minutes (United Kingdom)
- Countries: United Kingdom; United States; Germany; South Africa
- Language: English
- Budget: £17 million
- Box office: $22.5 million

Doomsday is a 2008 science fiction action film written and directed by Neil Marshall. The film takes place in the future in Scotland, which has been quarantined because of a deadly virus. When the virus is found in London, political leaders send a team led by Major Eden Sinclair (Rhona Mitra) to Scotland to find a possible cure. Sinclair's team runs into two types of survivors: marauders and survivors styling themselves after medieval knights. Doomsday was conceived by Marshall based on the idea of futuristic soldiers facing medieval knights. In producing the film, he drew inspiration from various movies, including Mad Max, Escape from New York (1981) and 28 Days Later (2002).

Marshall had a budget three times the size of his previous two films, Dog Soldiers (2002) and The Descent (2005), and the director filmed the larger-scale Doomsday in Scotland and South Africa. The film was released in the United States and Canada on 14 March 2008 and in the United Kingdom on 9 May 2008. It received mixed reviews from critics, who praised the casting, pacing, narrative, and homage to previous films, but criticized the plot holes, character development, confusing editing, and excessive gore. The film grossed $22 million worldwide, making it a box office bomb.

== Plot ==
In 2008, the Reaper Virus ravages Scotland. Unable to contain the outbreak or cure the infected, the UK government erects a 30-foot wall isolating Scotland. The quarantine succeeds, but the extreme method turns the country into a pariah state.

In 2035, authorities discover several people in London infected with Reaper. Satellite imagery spots survivors in Scotland, indicating the existence of a cure or immunity. To prevent an outbreak, Prime Minister John Hatcher orders Captain Nelson to send a team to Scotland to investigate, pointing at famed medical researcher Dr. Kane as a likely creator of the cure.

Nelson assembles a team led by Major Eden Sinclair, who hails from Scotland and was separated from her mother during the evacuation. Other team members include Sergeant Norton, Sinclair's deputy; virologists Dr. Stirling and Dr. Talbot; and several DDS troopers.

The team crosses the wall to Glasgow. While searching a hospital for survivors, they are ambushed by a group of marauders. Norton and Stirling escape, but the team suffers heavy casualties. Sinclair and Talbot are captured by a gang of brutal cannibals led by the power-hungry Sol, who plans to use Sinclair as leverage to cross the wall and invade England. Talbot is roasted and eaten. With the help of Cally, another prisoner, Sinclair escapes and kills Viper, Sol's second-in-command. She finds Norton and Stirling, and they flee on a train. Cally reveals that she and Sol are Kane's children. She also explains that Sol overthrew the previous government with his army of insurgents and refuted Kane's rule.

In London, the Reaper epidemic continues to spread. As he is being evacuated from the city, Hatcher is infected by an attempted assassin. Michael Canaris, Hatcher's Machiavellian advisor, uses it as an excuse to quarantine Hatcher and take command as the de facto Prime Minister. Hatcher commits suicide rather than succumb to the virus.

After leaving the train, Sinclair's group is captured by soldiers armed with archaic weapons and armor. They are taken to a castle and imprisoned by Kane, who reveals that there is no cure, but that people have developed an immunity to the Reaper Virus. After being left behind during the Scottish quarantine and losing his wife, Kane became a twisted and sadistic feudal lord who blamed science for the downfall of civilization. He sentences Sinclair, Cally, Norton, and Stirling to death. Sinclair is pitted against Telamon, Kane's executioner, in a duel. Sinclair wins, killing Telamon before escaping with the others.

They find an underground facility in the forest that contains various equipment and vehicles, including an intact Bentley. Before they can escape, Kane's knights arrive and kill Norton. Sinclair, Cally, and Stirling escape the facility but are soon intercepted by Sol and his gang. After a high-speed chase, Sol and many of his men are killed.

Sinclair calls Canaris and tells him she has the cure. Canaris arrives via helicopter, and Sinclair bargains with him to take Cally and Stirling back to London, where Stirling can use samples of Cally's blood to manufacture a vaccine. Canaris admits to Sinclair that he plans to hold back any cure until Reaper successfully eliminates much of the underclass in the form of social cleansing. Unbeknownst to Canaris, Sinclair secretly records the conversation using her bionic eye.

Instead of returning to London, Sinclair goes to Glasgow to search for her mother, but discovers she died during the quarantine. Nelson arrives, and Sinclair gives him the recording of Canaris' admission. Canaris is exposed on television, upon which he fearfully realizes that his career has ended and conviction is inevitable. Sinclair remains in Scotland and uses Sol's severed head as a means to assume leadership over his band of marauders.

== Cast ==
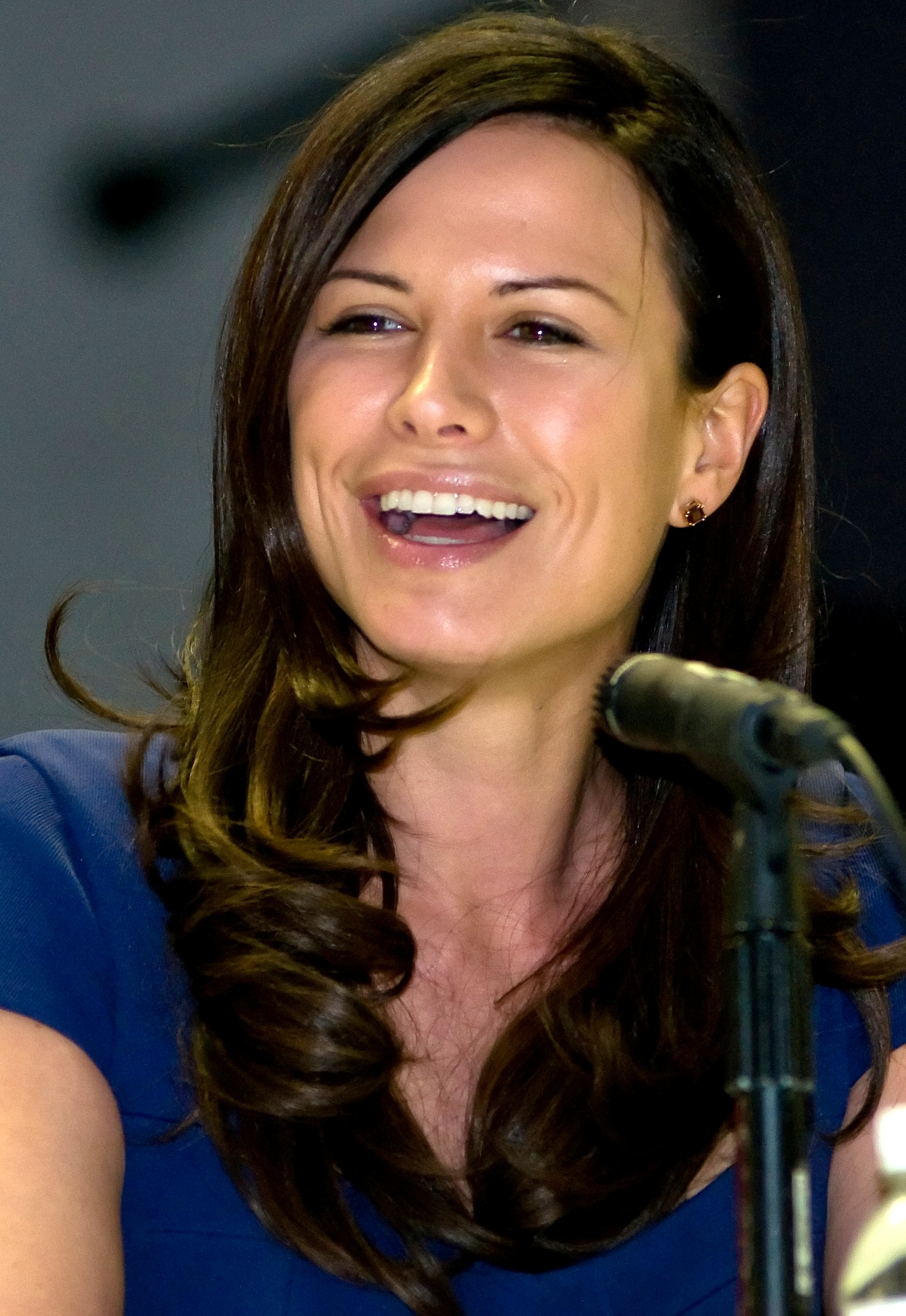
Actress Rhona Mitra starred in Doomsday as Major Eden Sinclair.

- Rhona Mitra as Eden Sinclair, a Major of the Department of Domestic Security, was selected to lead a team to find a cure. The heroine was inspired by the character Snake Plissken. Mitra worked out and fight trained for eleven weeks for the film. Marshall described Mitra's character as a soldier who has been rendered cold from her military indoctrination and her journey to find the cure for the virus is one of redemption. The character was originally written to have "funny" lines, but the director scaled back on the humor to depict Sinclair as more "hardcore".
- Bob Hoskins as Bill Nelson, Eden Sinclair's boss. Marshall sought to have Hoskins emulate his "bulldog" role from the 1980 film The Long Good Friday.
- David O'Hara as Michael Canaris, a corrupt senior official within the British government whose position is never stated, who acts as Hatcher's puppeteer. Canaris was depicted to have a fascist background, speaking lines that paralleled Adolf Hitler's mindset of cleansing.
- Malcolm McDowell as Marcus Kane, a former scientist who now lives as a feudal lord in an abandoned castle, having medieval army under his command and controlling parts of the country. McDowell described his character as a King Lear. According to Marshall, Kane is based on Kurtz from Joseph Conrad's Heart of Darkness. The director originally sought to bring Sean Connery out of retirement to play Kane but was unsuccessful. McDowell is the maternal-uncle of Alexander Siddig.
- Alexander Siddig as Prime Minister John Hatcher. Marshall originally wrote Hatcher as a sympathetic character misguided by Canaris, but revised the character to be more like Canaris in embracing political manipulation. Siddig is the maternal-nephew of Malcolm McDowell.
- Adrian Lester as Sergeant Norton, a member of Sinclair's team
- Craig Conway as Sol, Kane's son and the leader of the marauders. He has a biohazard sign tattooed on his back and a large scar across his chest. Even though he is Kane's son, he distanced himself from him and formed his own army. He was a young child in the original 2008 quarantine.

In addition, Lee-Anne Liebenberg portrays Viper, the wild woman who is Sol's second-in-command, while Hennie Bosman portrays Telamon (The Gladiator). Also cast as part of Eden Sinclair's team were Chris Robson as Miller, and Leslie Simpson as Carpenter. The names Miller and Carpenter were nods to directors George Miller and John Carpenter, whose films influenced Marshall's Doomsday. Sean Pertwee and Darren Morfitt portrayed the team's medical scientists, Dr Talbot and Dr Stirling, respectively. MyAnna Buring portrayed Kane's daughter Cally. Emma Cleasby played Eden's mother at the start of the film.

Miss Scotland and Miss United Kingdom, Nieve Jennings was an extra in the movie.

== Production ==
=== Conception ===
Director Neil Marshall lived near the ruins of Hadrian's Wall, a Roman fortification built to defend England against Scotland's tribes. The director fantasised about what conditions would cause the Wall to be rebuilt and imagined a lethal virus would work. Marshall had also visualised a mixture of medieval and futuristic elements: "I had this vision of these futuristic soldiers with high-tech weaponry and body armour and helmets—clearly from the future—facing a medieval knight on horseback." The director favoured the English/Scottish border as the location for a rebuilt wall, finding the location more plausible than a lengthy boundary between the United States and Canada. Additionally, Scotland is the home to multiple castles, which fit Marshall's medieval aspect.

The lethal virus in Doomsday differs from contemporary films like 28 Days Later and 28 Weeks Later by being an authentic plague that actually devastates the population, instead of infecting people so they become aggressive cannibals or zombies. Marshall intended the virus as the backdrop to the story, having survivors scavenge for themselves and set up a primitive society. The director drew from tribal history around the world to design the society. Though the survivors are depicted as brutal, Marshall sought to have "shades of gray" by characterising some people in England as selfishly manipulative.

The director intended Doomsday as a tribute to post-apocalyptic films from the 1970s and 1980s, explaining, "Right from the start, I wanted my film to be an homage to these sorts of movies, and deliberately so. I wanted to make a movie for a new generation of audience that hadn't seen those movies in the cinema—hadn't seen them at all maybe—and to give them the same thrill that I got from watching them. But kind of contemporise it, pump up the action and the blood and guts." Cinematic influences on Doomsday include:

- Mad Max (1979), Mad Max 2 (1981), and Mad Max Beyond Thunderdome (1985): Marshall drew inspiration from the punk style of the films and also shaped Rhona Mitra's character after Max Rockatansky as a police officer with a troubled history.
- Escape from New York (1981): The director drew from the concepts of gang warfare and the experience of being walled-in. Rhona Mitra's character has an eye patch like Snake Plissken, though the director sought to create a plot point for the eye of Mitra's character to reinforce its inclusion.
- Excalibur (1981): Marshall enjoyed John Boorman's artistry in the film and sought to include its medieval aspects in Doomsday.
- The Warriors (1979): The director the films of Walter Hill, including the "visual style of the gang warfare" in The Warriors. During the scene where Sol addresses the crowd in Glasgow, a Baseball Furies gang member can be seen in the crowd.
- No Blade of Grass (1970): Marshall perceived the film as a predecessor to 28 Days Later and 28 Weeks Later, though he sought to make Doomsday less straight-faced.
- The Omega Man (1971): The director was inspired by the "empty city" notion of the film and drew upon its dark and gritty nature.
- A Boy and His Dog (1975): Marshall created a homage to the 1974 film's ending by including a scene of a human being cooked.
- Waterworld (1995): The director was inspired by the gritty atmosphere and how people scavenge to survive and adapt in their new world.
- Gladiator (2000): As with the Russell Crowe character in the Ridley Scott film, Marshall sought to put Mitra's character through a trial by combat.
- Children of Men (2006): With this film coming out during the development of Doomsday, the director realised the similarity of the premises and sought to make his film "more bloody and more fun".

Marshall also cited Metalstorm (1983), Zulu (1964), and works of director Terry Gilliam like The Fisher King (1991) as influences in producing Doomsday. Marshall acknowledged that his creation is "so outrageous you've got to laugh". He reflected, "I do think it's going to divide audiences... I just want them to be thrilled and enthralled. I want them to be overwhelmed by the imagery they've seen. And go back and see it again."

=== Filming ===
Rogue Pictures signed Marshall to direct Doomsday in October 2005, and in November 2006, actress Rhona Mitra was signed to star in Doomsday as the leader of the elite team. Production was budgeted at £17 million, an amount that was triple the combined total of Marshall's previous two films, Dog Soldiers (2002) and The Descent (2005). The increase in scale was a challenge to the director, who had been accustomed to small casts and limited locations. Marshall described the broader experience: "There's fifty or more speaking parts; I'm dealing with thousands of extras, logistical action sequences, explosions, car chases — the works."

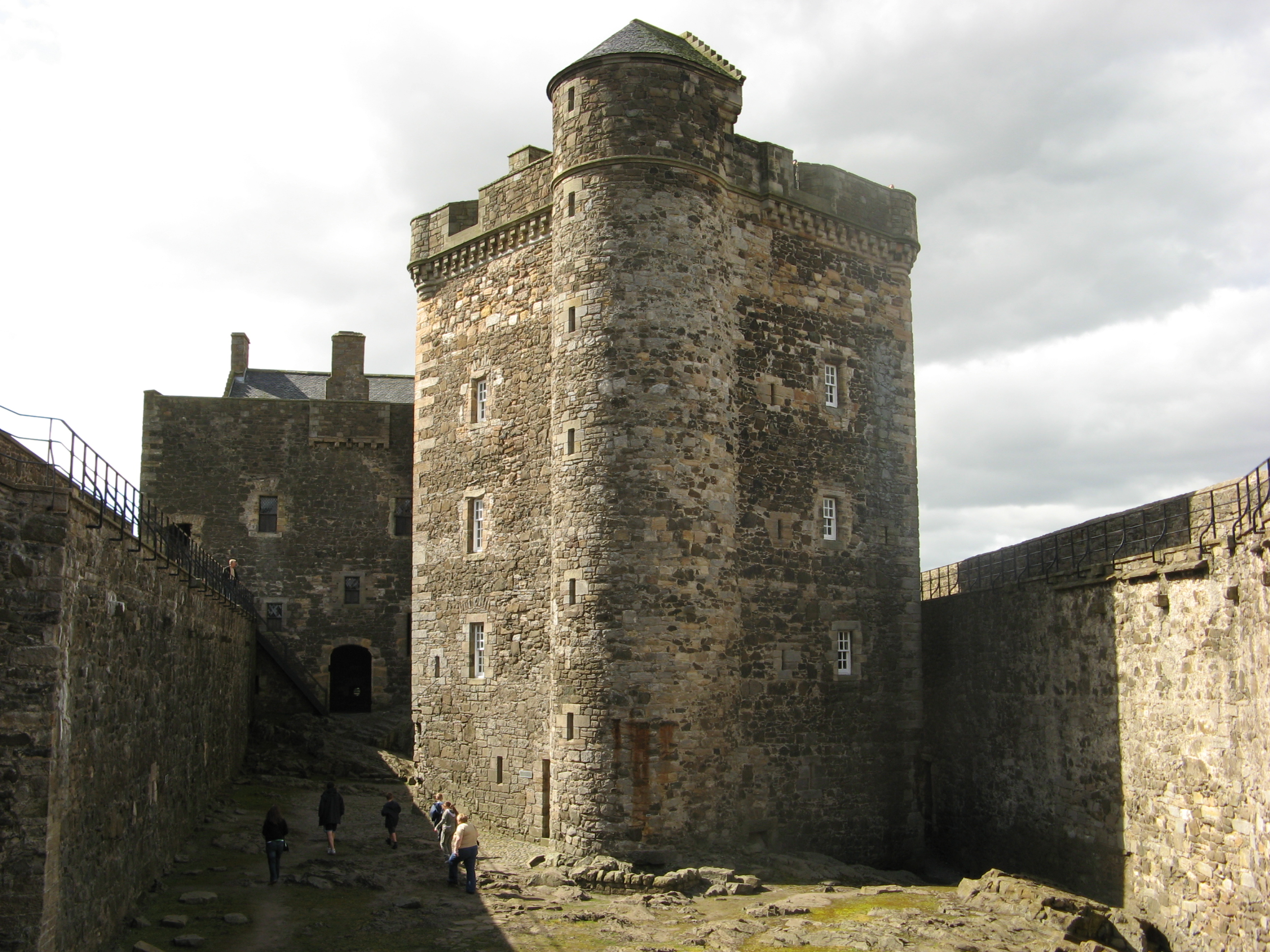
Part of filming took place inside Blackness Castle in Scotland.

Production began in February 2007 in South Africa, where the majority of filming took place. South Africa was chosen as a primary filming location for economic reasons, costing a third of estimated production in the United Kingdom. Shooting in South Africa lasted 56 days out of 66 days, with the remaining ten taking place in Scotland. Marshall said of South Africa's appeal, "The landscape, the rock formations, I thought it was about as close to Scotland as you're likely to get, outside of Ireland or Wales." In Scotland, secondary filming took place in the city of Glasgow, including Haghill in the city's East End, and at Blackness Castle in West Lothian, the latter chosen when filmmakers were unable to shoot at Doune Castle. The entire shoot, involving thousands of extras, included a series of complex fight scenes and pyrotechnical displays. The director sought to minimise the use of computer-generated elements in Doomsday, preferring to subscribe to "old-school filmmaking". In the course of production, several sequences were dropped due to budgetary concerns, including a scene in which helicopter gunships attacked a medieval castle.

A massive car chase scene was filmed for Doomsday, described by Marshall to be one part Mad Max, one part Bullitt (1968), and one part "something else entirely different". Marshall had seen the Aston Martin DBS V12 used in the James Bond film Casino Royale (2006) and sought to implement a similarly "sexy" car. Since the car company did not do product placement, the filmmakers purchased three new Bentley Continental GTs for US$150,000 each. The film also contains the director's trademark gore and violence from previous films, including a scene where a character is cooked alive and eaten. The production was designed by Simon Bowles who had worked previously with Marshall on Dog Soldiers and The Descent. Paul Hyett, the prosthetic make-up designer who worked on The Descent, contributed to the production, researching diseases including sexually transmitted diseases to design the make-up for victims of the Reaper virus.

=== Visual effects ===
The Bentley was filmed crashing through the bus without use of pyrotechnics due to fire hazards, and visual effects were later added to show the explosion.

The visual effects for Doomsday stemmed from the 1980s stunt-based films, involving approximately 275 visual effects shots. While filmmakers did not seek innovative visual effects, they worked with budget restrictions by creating set extensions. With most shots taking place in daylight, the extensions involved matte paint and 2D and 3D solutions. The visual effects crew visited Scotland to take reference photos so scenes that were filmed in Cape Town, South Africa could instead have Scottish backgrounds. Several challenges for the visual effects crew included the illustration of cow overpopulation in line with a decimated human population and the convincing creation of the rebuilt Hadrian Wall in different lights and from different distances. The most challenging visual effects shot in Doomsday was the close-up in which a main character is burned alive. The shot required multiple enhancements and implementations of burning wardrobe, burning pigskin, and smoke and fire elements to look authentic.

Neil Marshall's car chase sequence also involved the use of visual effects. A scene in which the Bentley crashes through a bus was intended to implement pyrotechnics, but fire marshals in the South African nature reserve, the filming location for the scene, forbade their use due to dry conditions. A miniature mock-up was created and visual effects were applied so the filming of the mock-up would overlay the filming of the actual scene without pyrotechnics. Other visual effects that were created were the Thames flood plain and a remote Scottish castle. A popular effect with the visual effects crew was the "rabbit explosion" scene, depicting a rabbit being shot by guns on automatic sensors. The crew sought to expand the singular shot, but Neil Marshall sought to focus on one shot to emphasise its comic nature and avoid drawing unnecessary sympathy from audiences.

=== Music ===
Marshall originally intended to include 1980s synth music in his film, but he found it difficult to combine the music with the intense action. Instead, composer Tyler Bates composed a score using heavy orchestra music. The film also included songs from the bands Adam and the Ants, Fine Young Cannibals, Siouxsie and the Banshees, Frankie Goes to Hollywood, and Kasabian. The song "Two Tribes" by Frankie Goes to Hollywood was the only song to remain in the film from the first draft of the screenplay. "Spellbound" by Siouxsie and the Banshees was a favourite song of the director, who sought to include it. Marshall also hoped to include the song "Into the Light" by the Banshees, but it was left out due to the producer disliking it and the cost being too high to license it.

== Release ==
=== Theatrical run ===
For its theatrical run, the film was originally intended to be distributed by Focus Features under Rogue Pictures, but the company transferred Doomsday among other films to Universal Pictures for larger-scale distribution and marketing beginning in 2008. Doomsday was commercially released on 14 March 2008 in the United States and Canada in 1,936 theatres, grossing US$4,926,565 in its opening weekend and ranking seventh in the box office, which Box Office Mojo reported as a "failed" opening. Its theatrical run in the United States and Canada lasted 28 days, ending on 10 April 2008, having grossed US$11,463,861. The film opened in the United Kingdom, Republic of Ireland, and Malta on 9 May 2008, grossing a total of US$2,061,794 in its entire run. The film's performance in the UK was considered a "disappointing run". The film premiered in Italy in August 2008, grossing an overall US$500,000. Worldwide, Doomsday has grossed US$22,472,631.

=== Critical response ===
"The director of top horror flicks The Descent and Dog Soldiers was given more money for his latest effort, but many thought he wasted it on a collection of flashy set pieces without much interlinking plot in between."

— Rotten Tomatoes editorial on UK's general consensus

Doomsday was not screened for critics in advance of its commercial opening in cinemas. On Rotten Tomatoes the film has an approval rating of 50% based on reviews from 74 critics, with an average rating of 5.3/10. The website's consensus reads, "Doomsday is a pale imitation of previous futuristic thrillers, minus the cohesive narrative and charismatic leads." On Metacritic it has a weighted average score of 51 out of 100, based on reviews from 14 critics, indicating "mixed or average" reviews. Audiences polled by CinemaScore gave the film an average grade of "B−" on an A+ to F scale.

Alison Rowat of The Herald perceived Doomsday as "decidedly everyday" for a thriller, with Marshall's script having too many unanswered questions and characters not fully developed despite a decent cast. Rowat said, "In his previous films, Marshall made something out of nothing. Here he does the opposite". The critic acknowledged the attempted homages and the B-movie approach but thought that "there has to be something more". Steve Pratt of The Northern Echo weighed in, "As a writer, Marshall leaves gaping holes in the plot while as a director he knows how to extract maximum punch from car chases, beatings and fights without stinting on the gore as body parts are lopped off with alarming frequency and bodies squashed to a bloody pulp." Philip Key of the Liverpool Daily Post described the film, "Doomsday is a badly thought-out science fiction saga which leaves more questions than answers."

Alonso Duralde of MSNBC described Doomsday: "It's ridiculous, derivative, confusingly edited and laden with gore, but it's the kind of over-the-top grindhouse epic that wears down your defenses and eventually makes you just go with it." Duralde believed that Mitra's character would have qualified as a "memorable fierce chick" if the film was not so silly. David Hiltbrand of The Philadelphia Inquirer rated Doomsday at 2.5 out of 4 stars and thought that the film was better paced than most fantasy-action films, patiently building up its action scenes to the major "fireworks" where other films would normally be exhausted early on.

Reviewer James Berardinelli found the production of Doomsday to be a mess, complaining, "The action sequences might be more tense if they weren't obfuscated by rapid-fire editing, and the backstory is muddled and not all that interesting." Berardinelli also believed the attempted development of parallel storylines to be too much for the film, weakening the eventual payoff. Dennis Harvey of Variety said Neil Marshall's "flair for visceral action" made up for Doomsday's lack of originality and that the film barely had a dull moment. He added, "There's no question that Doomsday does what it does with vigor, high technical prowess and just enough humor to avoid turning ridiculous." Harvey considered the conclusion relatively weak, and found the quality of the acting satisfactory for the genre, while reserving praise for the "stellar" work of the stunt personnel. Peter Hartlaub of the San Francisco Chronicle also praised the film's stunts, noting that it was reminiscent of "the beauty of the exploitation film era". Hartlaub said of the effect, "Hire a couple of great stuntmen and a halfway sober cinematographer, and you didn't even need a screenwriter."

Matt Zoller Seitz of The New York Times saw Rhona Mitra's character as a mere impersonation of Snake Plissken and considered the film's major supporting characters to be "lifeless". Seitz described his discontent over the lack of innovation in the director's attempted homages of older films: "Doomsday is frenetic, loud, wildly imprecise and so derivative that it doesn't so much seem to reference its antecedents as try on their famous images like a child playing dress-up."

=== Scottish response ===
Scotland's tourism agency VisitScotland welcomed Doomsday, hoping that the film would attract tourism by marketing Scotland to the rest of the world. The country's national body for film and television, Scottish Screen, had contributed £300,000 to the production of Doomsday, which provided economic benefits for the cast and crew who dwelt in Scotland. A spokesperson from Scottish Screen anticipated, "It's likely to also attract a big audience who will see the extent to which Scotland can provide a flexible and diverse backdrop to all genres of film."

In contrast, several parties have expressed concern that Doomsday presents negativity in England's latent view of Scotland based on their history. Angus MacNeil, member of the Scottish National Party, said of the film's impact: "The complimentary part is that people are thinking about Scotland as we are moving more and more towards independence. But the film depicts a country that is still the plaything of London. It is decisions made in London that has led to it becoming a quarantine zone."

Doomsday was not nominated or considered as a possible contender at the BAFTA Scotland awards despite being one of the largest film productions in Scotland in years; £2 million was spent on local services. Director Neil Marshall applied for membership with the organisation to add "fresh blood", but Doomsday was not mentioned during jury deliberations. According to a spokesperson from the organisation, the film was not formally submitted for consideration, and no one directly invited the filmmakers to discuss a possible entry. Several of BAFTA Scotland's jury members believed that the criteria and procedures for a Scottish film were unclear and could have been more formalised.

=== Haunted house ===
Doomsday was used as inspiration in building a haunted house for Halloween Horror Nights in Orlando.

=== Home media ===
Doomsday was the first Blu-ray title released by Universal Pictures after the studio's initial support of the now-folded HD DVD format. The unrated version was released on DVD and Blu-ray on 29 July 2008 in the United States, containing an audio commentary and bonus materials covering the film's post-apocalyptic scenario, visual effects, and destructive vehicles and weapons, as well as the film's original theatrical version. IGN assessed the unrated DVD's video quality, writing, "For the most part, it's a crisp disc that's leaps above standard def." The audio quality was considered up to par with the film's loud scenes, though IGN found volume irregularity between the loud scenes and the quiet scenes. IGN called the commentary "a pretty straight-up behind-the-scenes take on the movie and a bit over-congratulatory". It found the "most fascinating" featurette to be about visual effects, while deeming the other featurettes skippable.

== See also ==
- Apocalyptic and post-apocalyptic fiction
- Cannibalism in popular culture
- List of apocalyptic films
- List of dystopian films
