= The Descent Part 2 =

2009 film by Jon Harris

- Theatrical release poster
- Directed by: Jon Harris
- Screenplay by: James McCarthy; J Blakeson; James Watkins
- Produced by: Christian Colson; Ivana MacKinnon
- Starring: Shauna Macdonald; Natalie Mendoza; Douglas Hodge; Krysten Cummings; Gavan O'Herlihy; Josh Dallas; Anna Skellern
- Cinematography: Sam McCurdy
- Edited by: Jon Harris
- Music by: David Julyan
- Production companies: Celador Films; Pathé
- Distributed by: Warner Bros. Entertainment UK
- Release dates: 24 August 2009 (Fantasy Filmfest); 2 December 2009 (United Kingdom)
- Running time: 93 minutes
- Country: United Kingdom
- Language: English
- Box office: $7 million

The Descent Part 2 is a 2009 British adventure horror film and sequel to the 2005 horror film The Descent. It was directed by Jon Harris from a screenplay by James McCarthy, J Blakeson, and James Watkins. The film was produced by Christian Colson and Ivana MacKinnon; Neil Marshall, the writer and director of the original, was an executive producer. Shot in London and Surrey, it was released in cinemas in the UK on 2 December 2009 and was given a straight-to-DVD release on 27 April 2010 in the US.

== Plot ==
Two days after the events of the first film, in which six women, Sarah, Juno, Beth, Sam, Rebecca, and Holly entered an uncharted cave system, a traumatized and blood-covered Sarah escapes the cave system with amnesia. She is taken to a hospital, where the doctor finds that some of the blood on her is of the same blood type as Juno, one of her missing friends. Sheriff Vaines and his deputy Rios bring along the amnesiac Sarah and three pothole cave specialists – Dan, Greg, and Cath – to find the missing women. They are sent to the cave via an old mine shaft operated by an old man, Ed. The group discovers Rebecca's corpse near the entrance, causing Sarah to experience flashbacks of previous events before her escape. Vaines believes that she was responsible for the other women's disappearances. While crawling through a tunnel, Sarah suddenly attacks Vaines and Greg before fleeing.

When the team splits up in search of her, Vaines accidentally discharges his pistol after a crawler scares him. As a result, part of the cavern collapses and traps Cath under a pile of rocks, separating her from the rest. They decide to find an alternate way around in to try to free Cath and arrive in a room full of bones, finding Holly's damaged video camera among the debris. They watch the recordings and realize the missing women had been attacked by the crawlers. Sarah, hiding nearby, overhears the recording and regains her memories. A panicked Rios starts calling for help, alerting the crawlers to her location. Sarah saves her by covering her mouth, as the crawlers are blind and they hunt by relying on sound. The two of them watch and wait as a crawler kills Dan and drags his body away.

Meanwhile, Cath squeezes her way out and kills a crawler by crushing it under the rocks. She runs into Greg; they escape from another crawler and find Sam's body dangling from the ceiling across a chasm. They decide to use her body to swing across the chasm but are attacked by crawlers again. Greg sacrifices himself to buy time for Cath. Although Cath gets to the other side of the chasm, she is killed by a crawler when she breaks down and screams Greg's name.

Elsewhere, Vaines is attacked by a crawler but is saved by Juno, who is still alive. Sarah and Rios kill a crawler in a pool. They soon meet Vaines and Juno, and are shocked to see Juno alive. Juno is furious that Sarah left her to die after stabbing her leg with a pickaxe. Juno almost kills her before Rios lies that Sarah brought them to find her voluntarily. Juno then leads them to a feeding pit, which she claims has a passage to the surface that the crawlers use to gather food from above ground. Vaines handcuffs Sarah to himself so that she will not abandon them as she did Juno. When he falls over a ledge, he almost drags Sarah down with him. As crawlers approach them, Juno orders Rios to cut off Vaines's hand to save Sarah. Despite his protests, she does so, causing Vaines and the crawlers latched onto him to fall to their deaths.

Sarah, Juno, and Rios reach the exit, where they are blocked by a group of crawlers led by their large leader. They try to sneak past but Greg, who is dying from his injuries, appears and grabs Juno's leg in a last effort to save himself. She screams and attracts the crawlers. Greg dies and the women are left to fight once again. After all of the crawlers are killed, Sarah tries to rescue Juno from the leader, but it slashes Juno's stomach, mortally wounding her. Sarah then kills it before Juno dies in her arms. When more crawlers arrive, Sarah draws their attention to herself by screaming, giving Rios a chance to escape.

Rios escapes from the cave and tries to call for help. However, she is knocked unconscious with a shovel by Ed, who drags her back to the cave entrance and leaves her there. As Rios slowly regains consciousness, a blood-covered crawler emerges from the cave with its arms outstretched.

== Cast ==
- Shauna Macdonald as Sarah Carter
- Natalie Mendoza as Juno
- Krysten Cummings as Rios
- Gavan O'Herlihy as Vaines
- Anna Skellern as Cath
- Josh Dallas as Greg
- Douglas Hodge as Dan
- Michael J. Reynolds as Ed Oswald
- MyAnna Buring as Sam
- Saskia Mulder as Rebecca
- Alex Reid as Beth
- Nora-Jane Noone as Holly

== Production ==
Due to the first film being a commercial and critical success, it was decided that a sequel would be produced. While Neil Marshall would not direct the film, he was assigned to oversee its production as an executive producer.

Marshall received the first draft of the film in late July 2006, with no directors or cast in mind. He made it clear that he intended to incorporate more of the feeling of claustrophobia like that of a particular scene in the previous film. Marshall told Bloody Disgusting about new ideas for the film, "The monsters they can deal with, and a bit of the claustrophobia, they can deal with, but the combination is definitely something we want to incorporate that into the sequel, by putting the monster and the girls in a really tight spot." Jon Harris, the editor of the first film, was brought on to direct and edit the sequel. It is his only directing credit as of 2019.

The Descent was released in 2005 in the UK. test screenings for the movie done by Lionsgate, the film's American distributor, indicated an audience member was dissatisfied with the ending. The company edited out the last minute of the film, so that Sarah survives. This version of the film received higher scores in test screenings. When Dread Central asked Marshall which of the film's two endings the sequel would be picking up after, he said that it would not be announced until he approved a script.

Filming began in May 2008 at Ealing Studios in London. Ealing Studios was featured on BBC London in June 2008 going behind the scenes of the filming of Part 2. In that broadcast it was confirmed that Shauna MacDonald would be returning to play her character Sarah and that most of the other original cast members would return, some in flashbacks and possible hallucinations. The film was shot on all three of the main stages at Ealing Studios and some scenes were filmed on location at the Bourne Woods near Farnham in southwest Surrey, England.

The production designer was Simon Bowles, who designed the original film, with Mark Scruton as supervising art director. The sets were built by DRS Construction and Armordillo. The film used elaborate sets, miniatures, and blue screen digital images. This was revealed on BBC London's behind-the-scenes look. The VFX and digital set extensions were created by Swedish VFX company Filmgate.

== Release ==
The film was originally set to be released by Pathé in May 2009, but was delayed. It was released in France on 14 October, Japan on 7 November and Argentina on 19 November. It was released in UK cinemas on 4 December 2009. The film did not reach its expectation in the UK debuting at No. 9 making the first week domestic gross £313,739. Total gross in the UK stands at £674,550. In France the film has proven successful reaching No. 5 and grossing $1,097,535 in its opening weekend. Total gross in France now stands at $2,438,834.

=== Home media ===
In DVD sales, the film made over $7 million in the US. The US release date for The Descent: Part 2 was announced by the Weinstein Company on 12 February 2010 and was set for 27 April 2010, as a straight to DVD release through Lionsgate Home Entertainment. During its first week of release, it sold 46,000 units, with a gross of $982,000.

A Blu-ray version of the film has yet to be released in the US. The film debuted on Blu-ray in the UK by Pathé via 20th Century Fox Home Entertainment on 12 April 2010 as a Region B Locked disc.

== Reception ==
On the review aggregator website Rotten Tomatoes, 48% of 42 critics' reviews are positive, with an average rating of 5.1/10. The website's consensus reads: "The Descent 2 goes spelunking for its predecessors' unnerving power but never digs beyond surface chills, although this efficient splatterfest contains enough nasty set pieces to sate the gore-prone."

Tim Robey of The Telegraph gave the film 3/5 stars, stating, "Though it stretches credulity ... The last half-hour is a tense team scramble to get out, and stay out, but the best move in this above-par shocker is digging right back into the claustrophobic emotional traumas which made Part One so thrilling." Variety gave the film a mixed review stating, "Treading closely in the steps of its predecessor in every sense, the sequel has less emotional nuance, shows more of the monsters and opts this time for a less-interesting coed cast instead of the all-femme crew used so effectively in the original. Nevertheless, as popcorn entertainment, it delivers, and should satisfy fans on all platforms."

When asked about the film years later, Marshall stated that it was "totally unnecessary. The first film resolves itself, whichever ending you choose. It wraps it up in a way that was bleak, whichever way you cut it. The second film began and it didn't pick up from either ending."
