= Krysten Cummings =

American actress

- Born: 1974 or 1975 (age 51–52)
- Origin: Pennsauken, New Jersey, U.S.
- Genres: Pop, R&B
- Occupations: Singer, actress
- Instruments: Vocals, guitar
- Years active: 1996–present
- Labels: J:Funk Recordings, Soulfuric Trax
- Member of: OffWorld

Krysten Cummings (born 1974 or 1975) is a stage and film actress. She is also a musician. She appeared as Tina in the 1997 production of The Fix, and as Mimi in the 1998 version of the musical Rent for which she was a 1999 Olivier Award nominee.

== Background ==
Cummings is originally from Pennsauken Township, New Jersey. As a stage actress, she got her start at age 17 at the Ritz Theatre in Haddon Township, New Jersey. She graduated in 1992 from Camden Catholic High School. By 2014, she had been in more than 20 theatrical productions, and musically performed in more than 30 countries. Her career has taken her from Broadway to the West End in London.

She had a co-starring role in the 2009 horror, The Descent Part 2.

While she was in London, she came in to contact with Richard Archer, who fronted the rock band Hard-Fi. Certain recent-then events in the media put them both in a musical collaboration.

== Stage ==
Cummings played the original part of Tina in See Jane Run which premiered at London's Donmar Warehouse in 1997.

She was part of the ensemble of the Jesus Christ Superstar Arena Tour, and was a soul girl on the song "Superstar", sang by Tim Minchin.

In 2014, she performed a one-woman show at the Ritz Theatre for the "Build Jake's Place" project.

In 2015, she played the part of Mimi Marquez, a woman with HIV positive in the production of Rent which played at the Ritz Theater in Haddon Township NJ. In late 2015, it was announced that Cummings along with Debbie Kurup and Damien Flood would be appearing in the Seasons of Larson concert, a celebration of the life of Broadway composer Jonathan Larson. The concert was to be held at London's Lyric Theatre.

In late 2017, she played the Fairy Godmother in the Cinderella at the Hackney Empire Theatre.

She is a co-creator of The Bisley Boy, a gothic musical fantasy that follows the private life of Bram Stoker, which was to run at the Ritz Theatre from September 16 to October 2, 2022.

== Film work ==
Cummings provided the voice for Submerge in the 2009 sci-fi film, Ghost Machine which was directed by Chris Hartwill.

She played the role of Deputy Elen Rios in The Descent Part 2, a horror film about cave crawling creatures. It was the sequel to the 2005 film, The Descent. Cummings' character Rios was the only one to survive the ordeal following Shauna Macdonald's character Sarah sacrificing herself to let her escape.

== Music ==
In 2009, the single, "Sunrise" by Hoxton Whores feat. Krysten Cummings was released.

In 2013, she backed Bonnie Tyler on her song, "Believe in Me at the Eurovision Song Contest that year. She later backed Elnur Huseynov on his song, "Hour of the Wolf" at the 2015 Eurovision Song Contest.

In 2020, Cummings was a member of the band OffWorld which was made up of Richard Archer, herself, Wolsey White, Smiley Barnard and Dale Davis. Playing a mixture of blues, gospel and soul, on April 9 they released their EP, Brave to Be Alive. Later that month they released a single, "Burnt Out Star". Also that month Cummings and Richard Archer performed a set of songs from his home which included songs from the EP and some Hard-Fi songs. It was part of the Royal Albert Home sessions. The songs were transmitted from the homes of the artists while the Royal Albert Hall was closed.
