= MyAnna Buring =

Swedish-born British actress (born 1979)

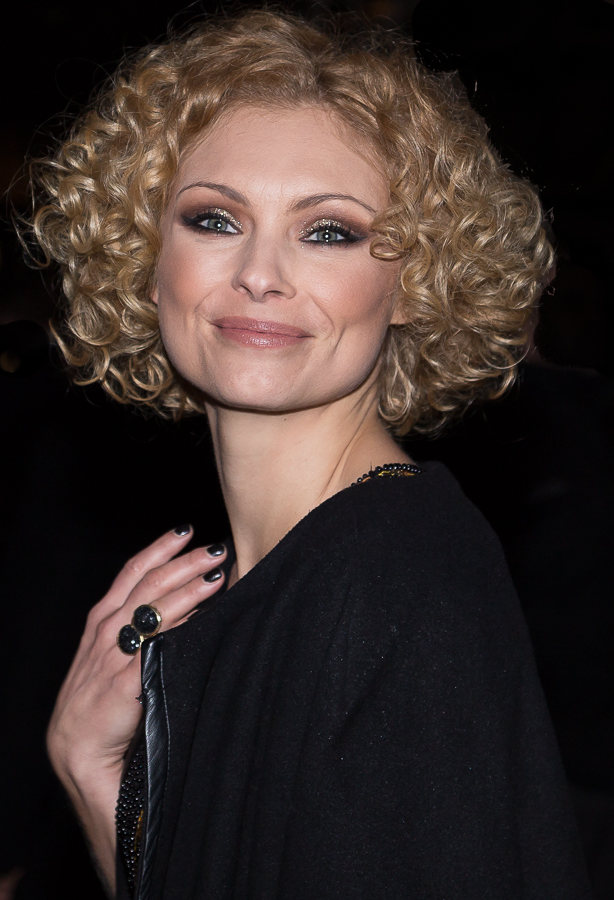
- Buring in 2014
- Born: My Margaretha Anna Buring Rantapää; 22 September 1979 (age 47); Sundsvall, Västernorrland, Sweden
- Education: University of Bristol; London Academy of Music and Dramatic Art
- Occupation: Actress
- Years active: 2004–present
- Children: 1

My Margaretha Anna Buring Rantapää (born 22 September 1979), known professionally as MyAnna Buring (Swedish: [mʏˈânːa ˈbʉ̂ːrɪŋ]), is a Swedish-born British actress. Her films include The Descent (2005), Kill List (2011), and The Twilight Saga: Breaking Dawn – Part 1 (2011) and Part 2 (2012). On television, she is known for her roles in the BBC series Ripper Street (2012–2016) and the Netflix series The Witcher (2019–2023).

== Early life and education ==
Buring was born My Margaretha Anna Buring Rantapää on 22 September 1979 in Sundsvall, Sweden, and later moved to the Middle East. Her father, Klas, was an orthopaedic consultant and surgeon, while her mother sold fur coats and Christmas trees in Kuwait.

Buring attended secondary school at the American British Academy in Muscat, Oman. As a teenager, Buring temporarily quit school and worked collecting glasses in a Stockholm bar. She then moved to England, where she completed the International Baccalaureate at a boarding school in Oxford. She studied drama and Spanish (though she eventually dropped Spanish) at the University of Bristol, and went on to graduate from the London Academy of Music and Dramatic Art (LAMDA) in 2004.

She was the associate director of the MahWaff Theatre Company.

== Career ==
=== Television ===
In 2006, Buring appeared in "The Impossible Planet", the first episode of a two-episode Doctor Who story. Her character, Scooti, perished in the vacuum of space. Buring also starred in Midsomer Murders (ITV), Casualty (BBC One) and Murder Prevention (Channel 5).

Buring played the role of the CND peace activist and student Adriana Doyle in series 3, episode 2, of Inspector George Gently, which was screened in the UK on BBC One in October 2010. In 2012, Buring had significant supporting roles in the BBC drama serials Blackout and Ripper Street. She also joined the cast of Downton Abbey, playing the role of the maid Edna Braithwaite in the 2012 Christmas special episode and the fourth season. In December 2012, Buring played protagonist Karen Clarke, a woman who is haunted by her past which eventually catches up with her, in a two-part drama called The Poison Tree that was broadcast on ITV1. In 2013, Buring appeared in an episode of NBC's Crossing Lines, playing villainess Anika Hauten. In July 2017, she played the lead role of Manchester police Detective Inspector Helen Weeks in BBC 4-part drama In the Dark.

In 2019, she started playing sorcereress Tissaia de Vries in the Netflix fantasy series The Witcher.

She played the role of Dawn Sturgess in the 2020 mini-series The Salisbury Poisonings. In 2022 she played the role of Kate Carson in the BBC TV drama The Responder.

=== Film ===
In her first film role, Buring starred in a leading role in the 2005 horror film The Descent, as one of the main characters among the women who ventured down into an uncharted cave system. Buring also appeared in the film's sequel, The Descent Part 2, in the form of flashbacks.

In 2008, Buring starred as Alice in the independent film Credo (also known as The Devil's Curse). Other film roles include Doomsday (2008), Lesbian Vampire Killers (2009), and Kill List (2011).

Buring also played Tanya, a vampire and leader of the Denali Coven who are "cousins" of Edward Cullen's family, in The Twilight Saga: Breaking Dawn Part 1 (2011) and Part 2 (2012).

=== Theatre ===
In 2006, Buring played Olivia in a production of Shakespeare's Twelfth Night by Exeter's Northcott Theatre Company, and appeared in a new play, Seduced, at London's Finborough Theatre. For MahWaff Theatre Company, she starred in Guardians, Monologue for an Ensemble and An Inspector Calls.

Buring played the lead as Vera in Mathilde Dratwa's Milk and Gall in South London's Theatre503. The show ran from 2 to 27 November 2021.

== Personal life ==
In May 2017, Buring gave birth to a son. In 2022, she opened up about her experience with antenatal depression, but generally prefers to keep the details of her personal life private.

== Activism ==
A 2013 interview with The Herald noted Buring's knowledge of and "interest in the world around her". She is a Women for Women ambassador and became involved with SolarAid in 2014. She is vocal on a number of social issues, such as climate change and the rights of refugees. In light of the Gaza war, Buring was one of over two thousand to sign an Artists for Palestine letter calling for a ceasefire and accusing western governments of "not only tolerating war crimes but aiding and abetting them."

== Filmography ==
=== Film ===
Year	Title	Role	Notes
2005	The Descent	Sam	
2006	The Omen	Tabloid Reporter #2	
2007	Grindhouse	Featured Woman	Segment "Don't"
2007	English Language (with English Subtitles)	Esther	Short film
2008	Doomsday	Cally	
2008	Freakdog	Shelby	
2008	Credo	Alice	
2009	The Road to Vengeance		Short film
2009	Lesbian Vampire Killers	Lotte	
2009	City Rats	Sammy	
2009	The Descent Part 2	Sam	
2010	Devil's Playground	Angela	
2010	Half Hearted	Lauren	Short film
2011	Au Revoir Monkeys	Anna	
2011	Way of the Morris	Will-O'-Wisps	Documentary, voice role
2011	Kill List	Shel	
2011	The Twilight Saga: Breaking Dawn – Part 1	Tanya Denali	
2012	The Twilight Saga: Breaking Dawn – Part 2	Tanya Denali	
2014	Hyena	Lisa	
2014	Lost in Karastan	Chulpan	
2015	Hot Property	Melody Munro	
2016	The Comedian's Guide to Survival	Nell	
2019	Official Secrets	Jasmine	
2019	Killers Anonymous	Joanna	
2023	97 Minutes	Kim	
2025	Last Breath	Hanna	

=== Television ===
Year	Title	Role	Notes
2004	Murder Prevention	Michelle Wynne	Episode "Last Man Out: Part 1"
2004	Casualty	Kirsty Morrison	Episode "Past Imperfect"
2006	Doctor Who	Scooti Manista	Episode "The Impossible Planet"
2007	The Bill	Kim Heyes	Episode "Stealth Attack"
2008	Midsomer Murders	Mandy	Episode "Midsomer Life"
2008	The Wrong Door	Various	5 episodes
2010	Comedy Lab	Inga	Episode "Filth"
2010	Witchville	Jozefa	Television film
2010	Inspector George Gently	Adriana Doyle	Episode "Peace & Love"
2010	Any Human Heart	Ingeborg	1 episode
2011	Super Eruption	Claire	Television film
2012	White Heat	Lilly	6 episodes
2012	Blackout	Sylvie	Three-part drama
2012–2013	Downton Abbey	Edna Braithwaite	Series 3 (Christmas special), Series 4 (4 episodes)
2012	The Poison Tree	Karen Clarke	Two-part drama
2012–2016	Ripper Street	Susan "Long Susan" Hart / Caitlin Swift	Series regular
2013	Agatha Christie's Marple	Lucky Dyson	Episode "A Caribbean Mystery"
2013	Crossing Lines	Anika	Episodes "The Animals" and "Desperation & Desperados"
2014	The Great War: The People's Story	Dorothy Lawrence	Episode: "Reg, Alan, James and Dorothy"
2015	Prey	Jules Hope	Series 2 (3 episodes)
2015	Dag	Anne	Series 4 regular
2015	Banished	Elizabeth Quinn	7 episodes
2017	In the Dark	DI Helen Weeks	4 episodes
2018	One Night	Elizabeth	NRK series
2019–2023	The Witcher	Tissaia de Vries	Main role (seasons 1–3)
2020	The Salisbury Poisonings	Dawn Sturgess	3 episodes
2022	Primal	Rikka	Voice role, episode "The Red Mist"
2022	Count Magnus	Froken de la Gardie	Television film
2022-2024	The Responder	Kate Carson	9 episodes
2024	The Fall: Skydive Murder Plot	Victoria Cilliers	Documentary
2025	Unforgotten	Melinda Ricci	Series 6
2026	Slow Horses	Jane	Series 6

=== Video games ===
Year	Title	Role	Notes
2016	The Witcher 3: Wild Hunt – Blood and Wine	Anna Henrietta	
2023	Mia and the Dragon Princess	Benicia	

== Stage ==
Year	Title	Role	Notes
2006	Twelfth Night	Olivia	Northcott Theatre, Exeter
2006	Seduced		Finborough Theatre, London
2021	Milk and Gall	Vera	Theatre503, London
2023	Anthropology	Merril	Hampstead Theatre, London
