= Arachnid (film) =

- Spanish theatrical release poster
- Directed by: Jack Sholder
- Written by: Mark Sevi
- Produced by: Brian Yuzna; Julio Fernandez; Sheri Bryant
- Starring: Chris Potter; Alex Reid; José Sancho; Neus Asensi; Ravil Isyanov; Luis Lorenzo; Rocqueford Allen; Robert Vicencio
- Cinematography: Carlos González
- Edited by: Jaume Vilalta
- Music by: Francesc Gener
- Production company: Fantastic Factory
- Distributed by: Filmax
- Release dates: June 29, 2001 (Spain); October 12, 2001 (US limited release)
- Running time: 90 minutes
- Country: Spain
- Language: English
- Budget: $561.000
- Box office: $1.136.807

Arachnid is a 2001 Spanish natural-horror film directed by Jack Sholder. The film centers on a group of plane crash survivors who have to survive the attacks of a giant alien spider and some mutated insects. The film stars Alex Reid, Chris Potter, José Sancho, Neus Asensi and Ravil Isyanov. It was the second film under the Fantastic Factory Label, created by Brian Yuzna and Julio Fernandez in Spain. The film received mostly negative reviews.

== Plot ==
In the South Pacific, a translucent alien spaceship hovers over the sea while a test stealth plane piloted by Joli Mercer encounters the spaceship and chases it. The plane begins to malfunction. He lands on a nearby island and finds the spaceship destroyed and its alien pilot. A big spider kills the alien and attacks Mercer, killing him with a dark screen, beginning the movie.

Ten months later, Loren Mercer, Joli's sister, is hired to be the pilot of a medical expedition organized by Dr. Samuel Leon and assistant Susana Gabriel, after having received a native from an island who died from an unknown virus. The expedition is led by Lev Valentine with soldiers Bear and Reyes, arachnologist Henry Capri, native guide Toe Boy and two other native helpers. Once they reach the island, the plane begins to malfunction (possibly due to the alien spaceship) and they are forced to crash land onto the beach.

The next morning, some mutated ticks burrow into Reyes, causing extreme pain as they move under his skin, along with Mercer falling and getting halfway stuck in a spider nest before being pulled out and saved. Upon reaching the village, they find it deserted and Capri discovers that several insects have mutated. Ticks then start to come out of Reyes in an extremely gory scene and Bear mercy kills him to end his pain. At night, the group is attacked by a giant centipede, killing one of the natives by slitting their neck. Mercer finds some of her brother's clothes and confesses to Valentine that she's looking for her brother, as she kept it a secret until then. Valentine decides they all are leaving the island next morning, although Mercer and Capri refuse.

Next day, Valentine agrees to help Mercer find Joli once they get everyone off the island but Capri has left the village. Bear is sent with a native to find a radio signal for help but while on a river, the native is killed by a small spider-like creature, spitting what seems like acid. Capri finds the giant centipede dying and the giant spider dangles above him, slowly descending. The rest of the group find the remains of Joli stuck in a tree. Then they find Capri trapped in spider web and bitten by it, he deduces that there's a giant alien spider trying to breed, he is numbed by it's venom and claims his insides will be food for the babies. Capri asks to be killed and Susana does so, by lethal injection. The spider reaches them and they flee. While doing so, Susana is trapped in spider webs and she escapes thanks to Mercer and Valentine. Samuel is caught by the spider and kills him by throwing acid to his face.

The three enter a military bunker after Toe Boy disappears. The spider attacks through one of the windows and Valentine attacks back, getting cut by one of its fangs. Mercer shoots the spider in an eye and it flees. At night, the spider sneaks through the bunker's roof and they run away before becoming locked in a small room. Susana, suffering from claustrophobia, opens the door, seeing no spider outside and gets ambushed, pulled out and impaled through the chest by its stinger. After cutting one of its legs with the door, the rest of the remaining crew escape through a trapdoor to some underground tunnels. Once outside Mercer falls asleep and has a nightmare about her brother. He appears beside her and she goes to hug him before spider legs come from his body and his face is ripped open to reveal the spider. Upon waking up the next morning, Bear and Toe Boy find them and they all try to kill the spider.

In the tunnels, a weak Valentine stays behind. They find the spider breeding in a silk cocoon over a giant egg sac. Mercer plans to knock the spider down and have Bear shoot it but it awakes early and kills Bear. Mercer throws Toe Boy's vial of black widow poison to the spider's face, hurting it and causing it's face to foam up. The spider chases Mercer but upon stumbling, it traps her in spider web. When it is about to kill her, Valentine appears shooting at it while Toe Boy throws poisoned darts. As it tries to flee, Mercer pulls the spider web thread, causing the spider to fall off the ceiling, directly onto a stalagmite, killing it. As they walk through the jungle to the plane, another giant spider watches them from an overhead cliff as the movie fades to black with "The End."

== Cast ==
- Alex Reid as Loren Mercer
- Chris Potter as Lev Valentine
- José Sancho as Dr. Samuel Leon
- Neus Asensi as Susana Gabriel
- Ravil Isyanov as Henry Capri
- Rocqueford Allen as "Bear"
- Robert Vicencio as "Toe Boy"
- Luis Lorenzo Crespo as Reyes
- Jesús Cabrero as Joli Mercer / "Lightfoot"
- Héctor Chuquín as Native 1
- Conejo Wilson as Native 2
- Fausto Gualsaqui as Native 3

Arachnid was the first role of Alex Reid's acting career. José Sancho agreed to participate in the movie since he had never worked a film with so many special effects. Neus Asensi was excited about working on the film as it was her first role in a film shot entirely in English, also because this type of movies are not normally made in Spain.

== Production ==
Written by Mark Sevi, the script was brought to Yuzna by co-producer Sheri Bryant. Yuzna wanted the Fantastic Factory label to represent different types of horror movies, so he liked the idea of making a monster movie arguing that those movies has no plot elements that would be controversial in any country in the world. The script was re-written by Yuzna and Sevi, adding the little creatures before the giant spider shows up to build tension.

It is the second film under the Fantastic Factory label and the second film to be released by the label in 2001 after Faust: Love of the Damned got released in Spain in January. The film was shot in Barcelona for on-set scenes and Mexico for outdoors scenes from May 15 to July 1, 2000. The main spider design and other creatures practical effects were created by Steve Johnson and his team, XFX. Anthony C. Ferrante, director of the Sharknado film series, was a special makeup effects consultant in the film.

Brian Yuzna contacted Robert Kurtzman and Tobe Hooper to direct the film but producer Julio Fernández suggested Jack Sholder after watching The Hidden. At that time, Sholder was going to direct a 12 million dollar action film with Steven Seagal but the project fell apart:

I was supposed to do another movie, a 12 million dollar action movie with Steven Seagal. While I was trying to get that movie together, they were asking me to do Arachnid. I kept holding them off, in the hopes that we could finally get a green light for the Seagal movie. Finally, the Arachnid people said: we have to go forward, so it’s either yes or no right now. At that point the Seagal movie basically fell apart. It never got made. So, I agreed to do Arachnid.

About the design and operation of the main giant spider, Sholder recalls:

They spent a lot of money on the spider. It was done by Steve Johnson in LA. I flew there to work with him on the design. When ready, he was going to send over two people to help operate it, but it also needed six or eight more professional puppeteers. Each leg had to be operated by somebody, and there was the mouth and a lot of electronic stuff. So, they got six university students who had no experience whatsoever. And they had like a day to figure out who’s moving what. By the end of the shoot, they finally figured out how to operate it.

On the editing of the film, Sholder stated:

When the shoot was done, I flew back to the States, while the editor was working on it. I don’t remember if they chose him or I did, but I don’t think the guy ever edited a horror film before. I came back to Barcelona to look at the first cut. It was a giant spider movie without a giant spider. The spider didn’t work at all. I ended up using every trick and skill I had ever learned as an editor to fix it. Every working shot of the spider we used multiple times. We would speed it up, blow it up, run it in reverse.

== Release ==
=== Theatrical release ===
Arachnid received a limited release in United States on October 12, 2001. In Spain got released on June 29, 2001. It grossed around €301.832 ($351.364) and had 73.542 viewers.

According to Fantastic Factory: El Cine de los Condenados (Fantastic Factory: Cinema of the Damned), a Spanish book about the label, the budget was €543.400 ($561.000) and grossed €1.100.656 ($1.137.414) worldwide.

=== Home media ===
The film was released on DVD by Mosaic Movies on February 18, 2002. It was re-released by both Lionsgate and Maple Pictures in the United States and Canada respectively on March 26, 2002. It was released by Mosaic Movies again on February 17, 2003.

In Spain had a VHS and DVD release in late 2001. The DVD version includes a trailer, interviews (with José Sancho, Neus Asensi and Luis Lorenzo Crespo), making of, Spanish TV spots and some storyboards. This DVD version was also included in a Fantastic Factory DVD collection along Faust: Love of the Damned, Dagon and Romasanta. Arachnid was released on Blu-ray in April 2026 by Gabita Barbieri Films.

In April 2011, Arrow Video released in United Kingdom a DVD collection named "Fantastic Factory presents..." which included Arachnid, Faust: Love of the Damned, Romasanta and Beyond Re-Animator. This DVD has the original trailer and interviews with producer Brian Yuzna and creature designer Steve Johnson.

== Reception ==
Arachnid received negative reviews for its lackluster CGI, script, low budget and acting while the practical special effects received some praise.

Spanish reviews were mixed to negative. El País said: "Sholder knows that the important thing is to have a good time and scrupulously comply with the commandments of the subgenre: monsters with a rancid look, killing the actors in inverse order to their charisma and their salary. To watch and discuss with friends, a lot of desire to party and a lot of popcorn." Film magazine Fotogramas rated it 3/5. Juan Luis Daza, author of the book Fantastic Factory: El Cine de los Condenados, gave it a negative review: “Arachnid is a mediocre film that encapsulates all the virtues and flaws that shaped the essence of Fantastic Factory, but with an uninspiring result despite the efforts of almost everyone involved in its creation.”

Dread Central rated the film 1 and a half out of 5. Buzz McClain from Allmovie gave the film a more positive review: "In spite of the film's numerous flaws, there's a certain brainless charm to it all that will amuse those looking for nothing more than a few cool maulings and no amount of intellectual challenge." In 2024, Bloody Disgusting said: "Arachnid, while far from flawless, somewhat redeems itself by having chosen practical effects and animatronics over CGI, which had become the new normal in these kinds of films. While there is no denying the reality and outcome of Arachnid, even the most mediocre films have their strokes of brilliance, small as they may be."

In retrospective, director Jack Sholder has stated his dislike on the film:

It was a really stupid script. I was at a point in my career where I really couldn’t say no to anything that was for sure going to happen. And Arachnid was for sure going to happen. I thought I could work on it but I discovered there wasn’t a whole lot I could do. But they paid me my fee and I got to live in Barcelona for six months. Everything was great, except for the fact that I had to make a stupid movie. It’s the only film I’ve done that I think is a real dud. I’ve had people tell me that they like it, but it doesn’t change my opinion.

On the CGI and final product, producer Brian Yuzna said:

To have good digital effects, you needed a budget like Jurassic Park. It was too expensive, so we shot mostly with miniatures. I don't know if we should have gone digital, but the digital effects in Arachnid are poor and detract from the film's credibility. Today it could be done much better. But I really liked the concept. It was a good movie for all ages, and Jack Sholder did a good job; I think it worked well.

Special effects artist Steve Johnson praised the practical special effects:

I look back at that movie and I have to say that I'm really pleased with the effects on it. I really am. I mean for a low budget movie with a bunch of people from a foreign country, I loved what we did. I think we did some pretty outstanding stuff and it's all practical. I'm really pleased with it.
