= National Register of Historic Places listings in New Jersey =

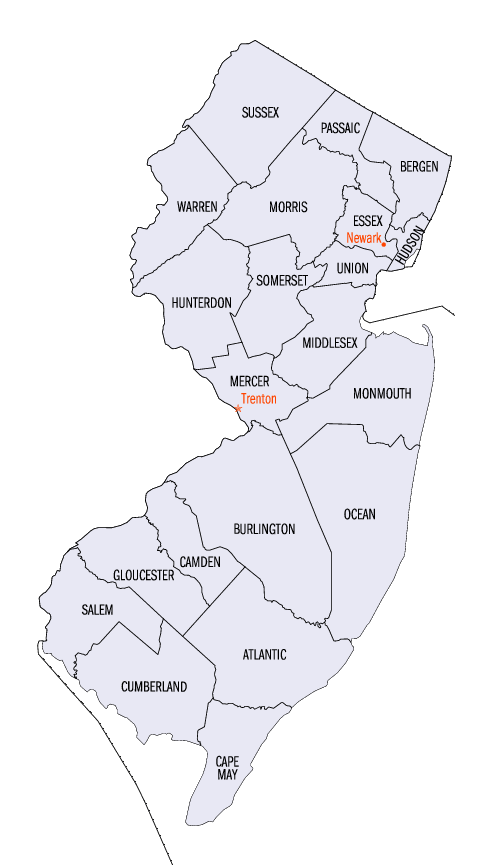
New Jersey counties (clickable map)

This is a list of properties and districts listed on the National Register of Historic Places in New Jersey. There are more than 1,700 listed sites in New Jersey. Of these, 58 are further designated as National Historic Landmarks. All 21 counties in New Jersey have listings on the National Register.

This National Park Service list is complete through NPS recent listings posted September 25, 2026.

Contents: Counties and communities in New Jersey
Atlantic – Bergen (Closter, Franklin Lakes, Ridgewood, Saddle River, Wyckoff) – Burlington – Camden – Cape May – Cumberland – Essex – Gloucester – Hudson – Hunterdon – Mercer – Middlesex – Monmouth – Morris – Ocean – Passaic – Salem – Somerset – Sussex – Union – Warren

== Current listings by county ==
The following are approximate tallies of current listings in New Jersey on the National Register of Historic Places. These counts are based on entries in the National Register Information Database as of April 24, 2008 and new weekly listings posted since then on the National Register of Historic Places web site. There are frequent additions to the listings and occasional delistings and the counts here are approximate and not official. New entries are added to the official Register on a weekly basis. Also, the counts in this table exclude boundary increase and decrease listings which modify the area covered by an existing property or district and which carry a separate National Register reference number. The numbers of NRHP listings in each county are documented by tables in each of the individual county list-articles.

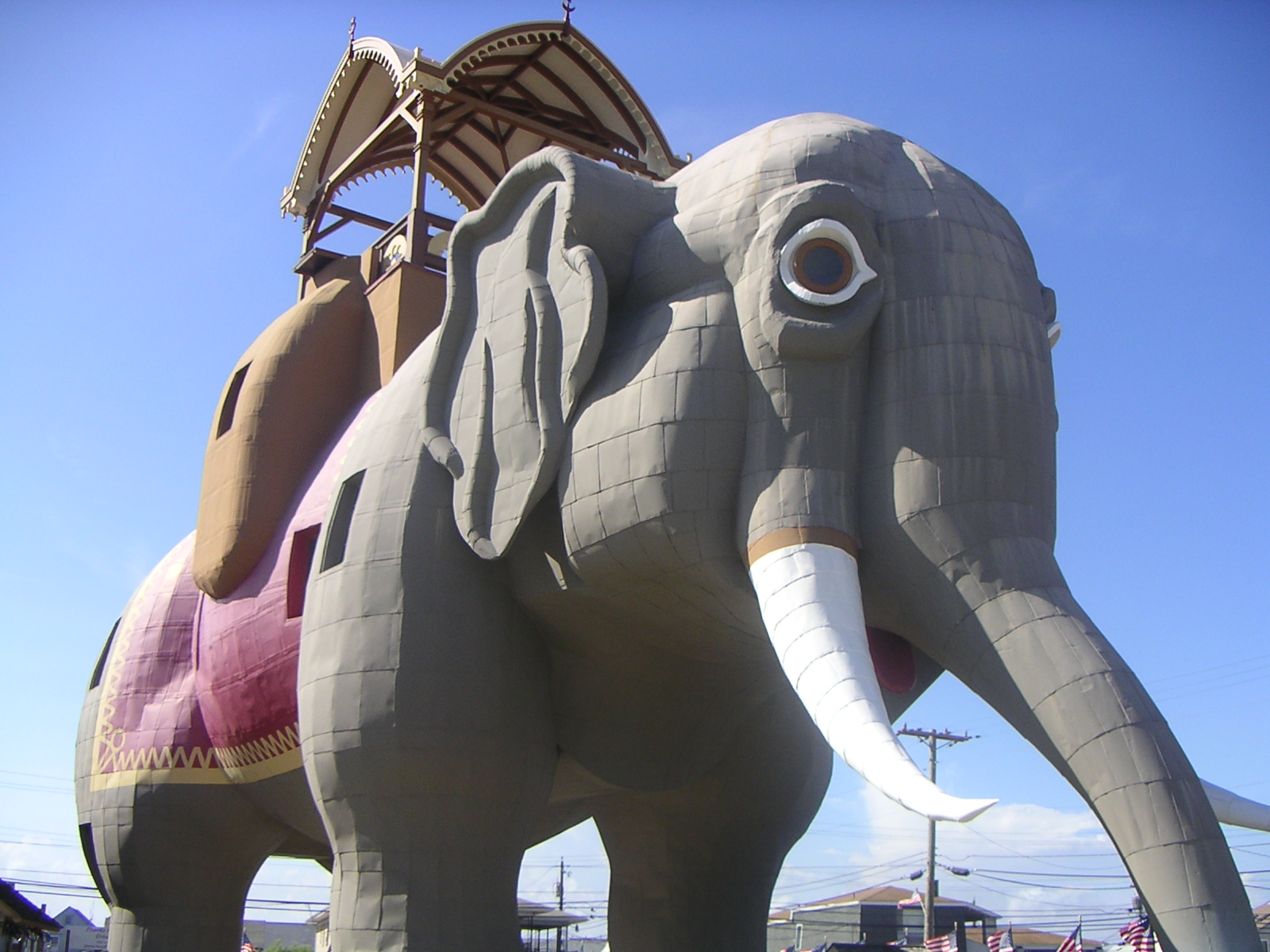
The Margate elephant, Atlantic County

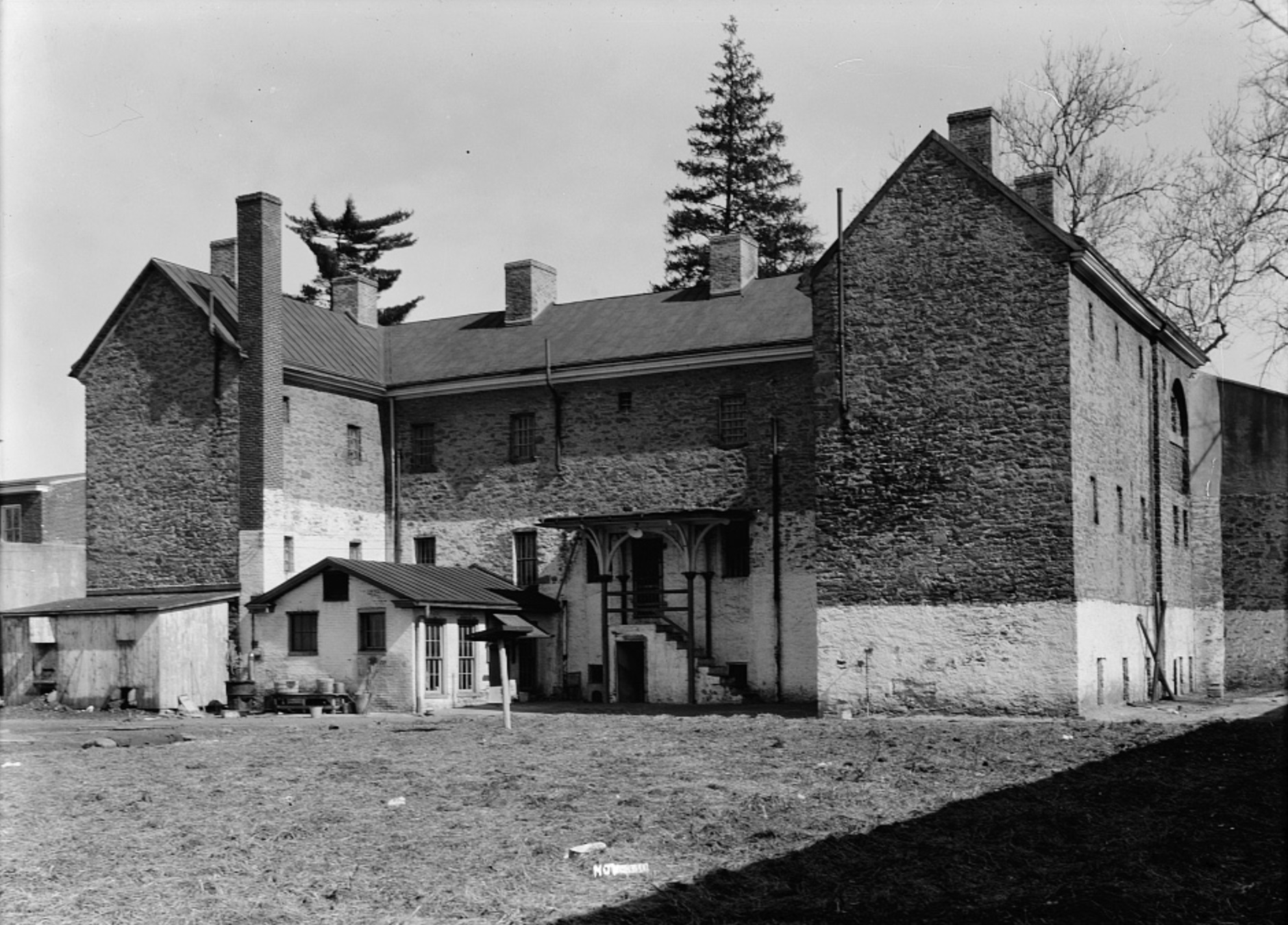
Burlington County Prison, Burlington County

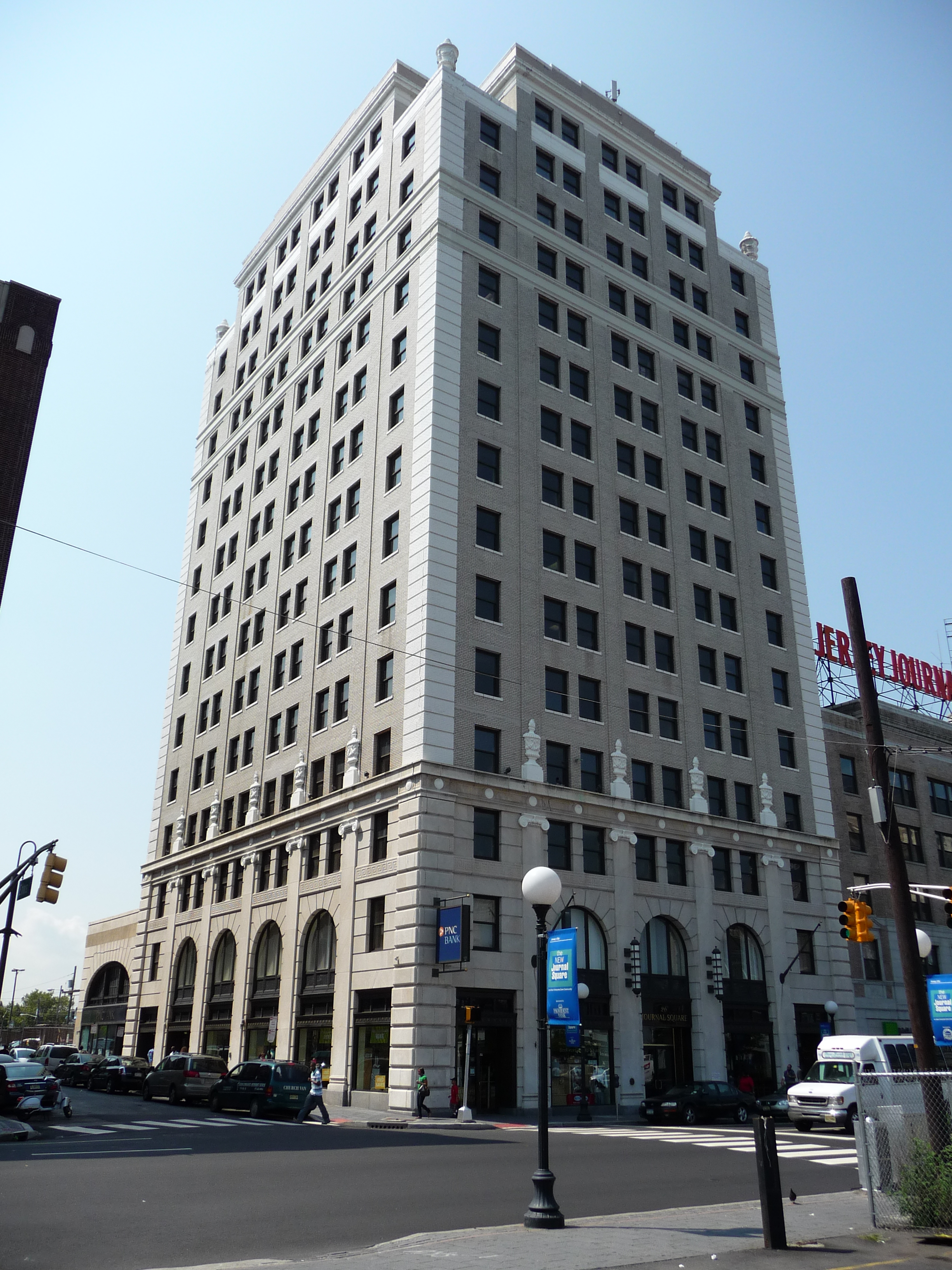
Labor Bank Building, Hudson County

| | County | # of Sites |
|---|---|---|
| 1 | Atlantic | 50 |
| 2.1 | Bergen: Closter | 10 |
| 2.2 | Bergen: Franklin Lakes | 14 |
| 2.3 | Bergen: Ridgewood | 14 |
| 2.4 | Bergen: Saddle River | 23 |
| 2.5 | Bergen: Wyckoff | 15 |
| 2.6 | Bergen: Other | 202 |
| 2.7 | Bergen: Total | 278 |
| 3 | Burlington | 100 |
| 4 | Camden | 100 |
| 5 | Cape May | 55 |
| 6 | Cumberland | 30 |
| 7 | Essex | 178 |
| 8 | Gloucester | 36 |
| 9 | Hudson | 64 |
| 10 | Hunterdon | 105 |
| 11 | Mercer | 119 |
| 12 | Middlesex | 81 |
| 13 | Monmouth | 113 |
| 14 | Morris | 160 |
| 15 | Ocean | 37 |
| 16 | Passaic | 44 |
| 17 | Salem | 27 |
| 18 | Somerset | 94 |
| 19 | Sussex | 38 |
| 20 | Union | 71 |
| 21 | Warren | 47 |
| (duplicates) | | (33) |
| Total: | | 1,794 |

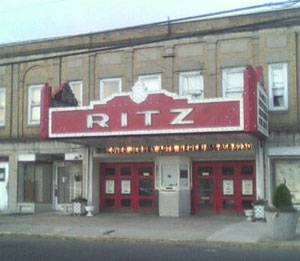
Ritz Theatre, Camden County

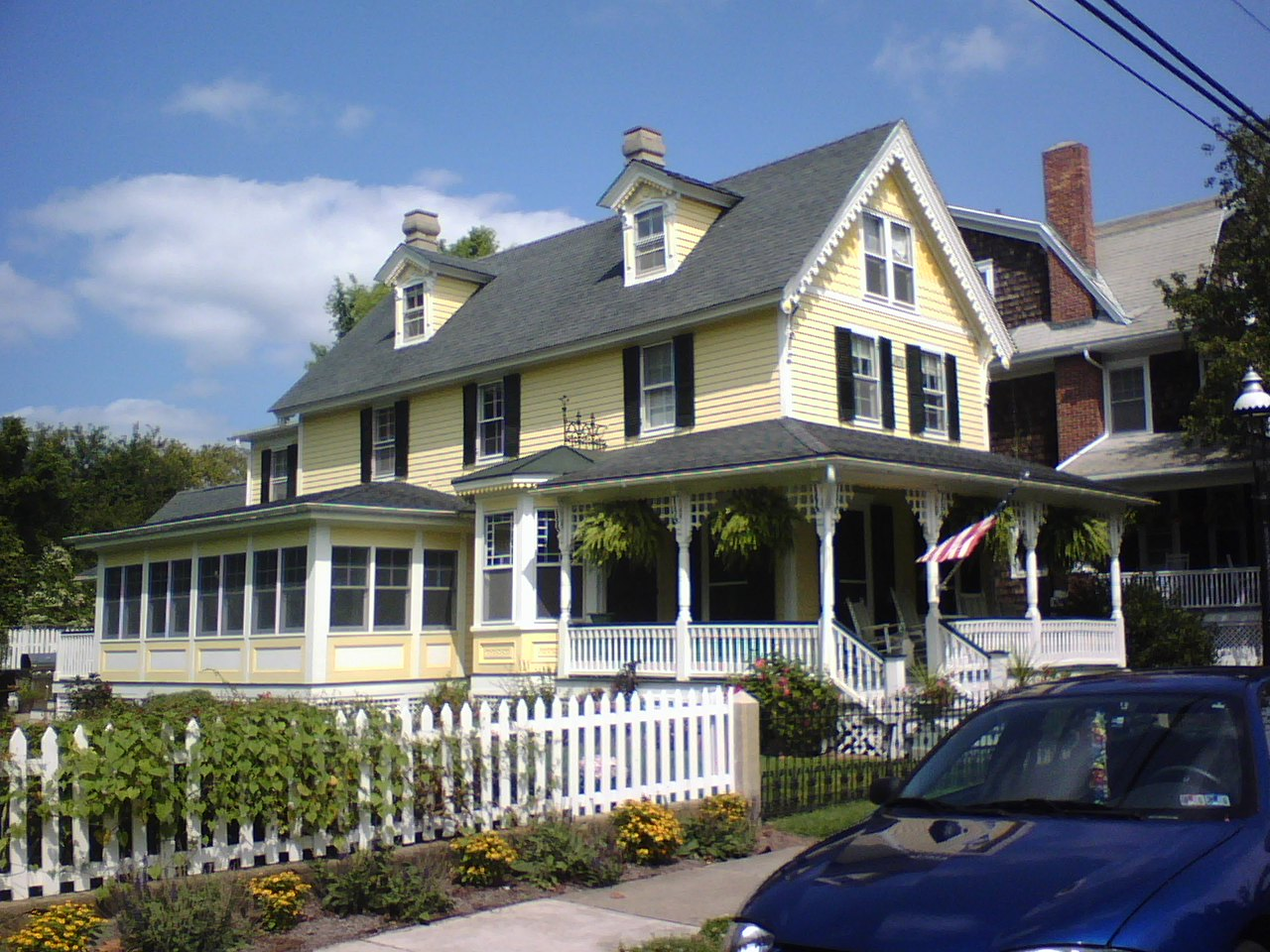
Cape May Historic District, Cape May County

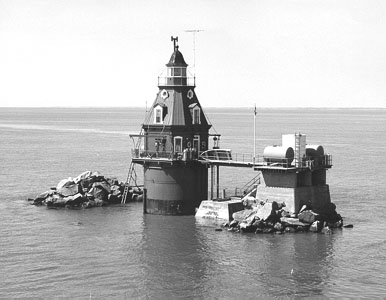
Ship John Shoal Light Station, Cumberland County

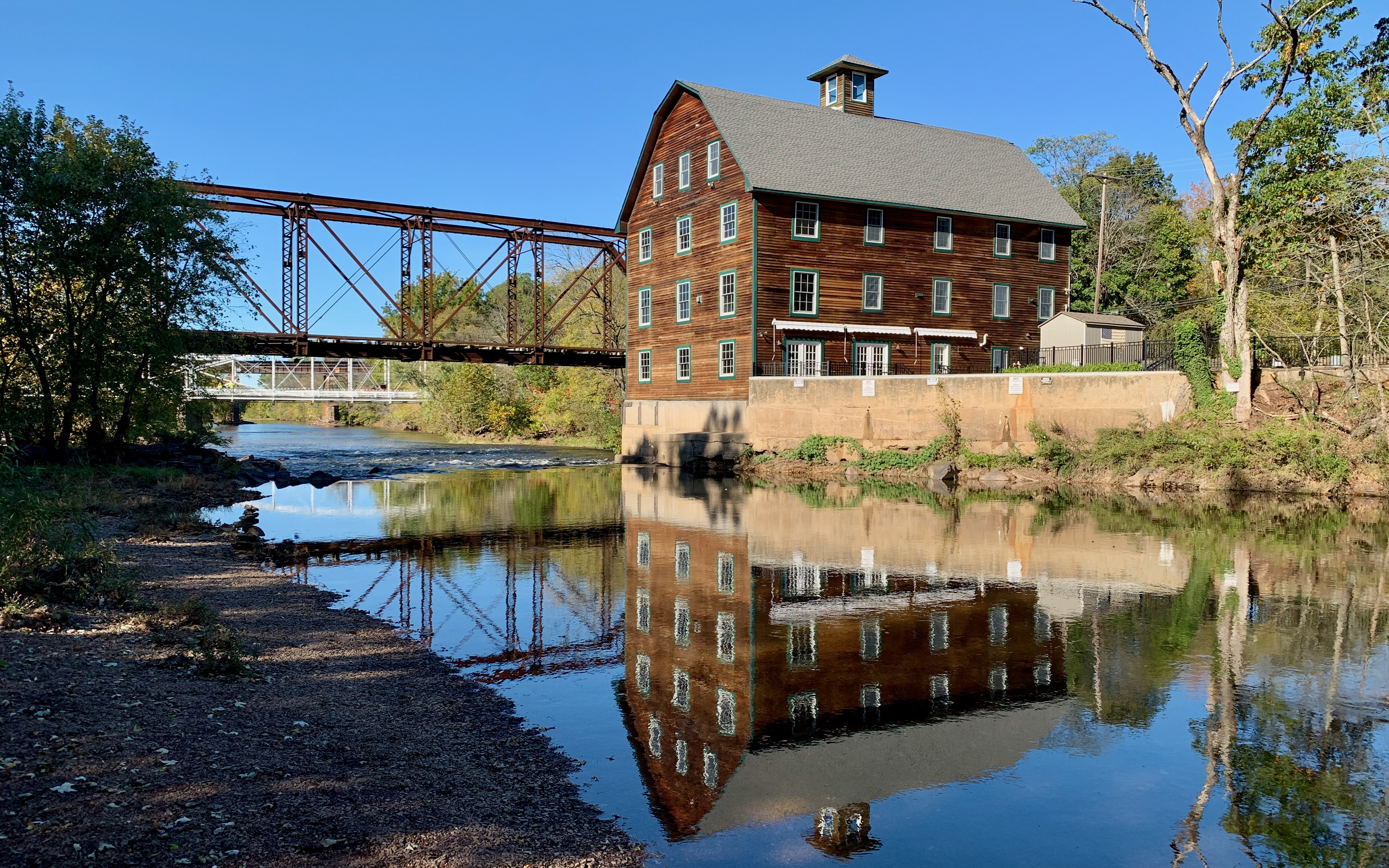
Neshanic Mills, Somerset County

== See also ==
- Operating Passenger Railroad Stations Thematic Resource
- List of National Historic Landmarks in New Jersey
- List of bridges on the National Register of Historic Places in New Jersey
- List of historical societies in New Jersey
