= Ritz Theatre (Haddon Township, New Jersey) =

Theater in Haddon Township, New Jersey, USA

- U.S. National Register of Historic Places
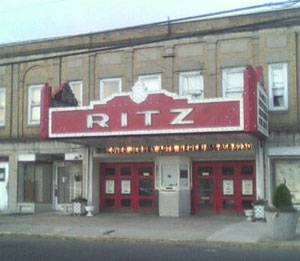
- Ritz Theatre, October 2005

- Location within Camden County, New Jersey Location within New Jersey Location within the United States
- Location: 915 White Horse Pike, Haddon Twp., NJ 08104
- Coordinates: 39°54′1″N 75°4′33″W
- Area: less than one acre
- Built: 1927
- Architect: Hodgens & Hill
- Architectural style: Colonial Revival
- NRHP reference No.: 02001625
- Added to NRHP: December 26, 2002

The Ritz Theatre is a theater located in Haddon Township, New Jersey. The venue is owned and operated by The Ritz Theatre Company, a nonprofit organization. The theater was added to the New Jersey and National Register of Historic Places in 2002.

== History ==
The Ritz Theatre was built in 1927 by William E. Butler for an estimated $400,000 and designed by the architectural firm Hodgens and Hill with 800 seats. It was named after the Ritz hotel in Paris. The groundbreaking ceremony in February 1927 was attended by Oaklyn, New Jersey, borough officials. It was built in a Classical Revival architectural style as a movie theater and opened on September 12, 1927, with the film Tillie the Toiler. Vaudeville acts also performed alongside movie showings. The auditorium walls feature neo-classical canvas murals with gilt trimmed columns and velvet draped balconies enclosed by classic carved balustrades.

The ceiling of the theater collapsed in the 1930s and after the repairs were made, the seating capacity changed to 600. By 1948, the theatre was operated by the Peerless Corporation. Starting in March 1954 with The Lavender Hill Mob, through the 1960s, the Ritz showed fine art and foreign films. In the 1970s, the Ritz became an adult movie theater operated by a company that operated another pornographic movie theater. The theater closed in early 1985.

On October 7, 1985, a theatre company led by producing artistic director Bruce A. Curless, Puttin' on the Ritz, Inc., rented the Ritz Theatre and renamed it the Ritz Vaudeville Theater. The stage was expanded over existing rows of seating, reducing the capacity to 400 seats. Actors hired to perform in the first season of shows were unpaid. The company produced its first season of theatre performances beginning in January 1986 with a production of The Boy Friend. In 1990, the theatre's production of Children of a Lesser God began a commitment to American Sign Language. This initiative later turned into having Shadow Interpreters for the theatre's annual Christmas tradition of Scrooge in 2006 and 2008, as well as mainstage shows such as Arsenic and Old Lace in 2010.

The Ritz Theatre Company, Inc. presents six mainstage productions and eight children's productions each season. They serve more than 73,300 patrons annually. Also offered are holiday shows, special events, summer theatre camp, dramatic workshops and outreach programs. The Theatre building also boasts The Gallery at the Ritz, an in-house art gallery that offers professional monthly art exhibits.

In 2001, the board of directors purchased the 466-seat theatre, making it the permanent home of the ensemble. On December 26, 2002, the Ritz was added to the New Jersey and National Register of Historic Places.

During a renovation, the roof was replaced, the electrical system was upgraded, and sprinklers were installed. The lobby was renovated with new carpeting and paint, and work had begun on restoring the front of the building and the classic marquee as well as the classical Greek interior murals.

In April 2014, the Ritz held its first fundraiser to keep the building and theatre going. The first annual "Rock The Ritz" fundraiser brought in over $11,000 to help the organization.

== Notable people ==
- Krysten Cummings
- Cory Wade Hindorff
- Cristin Milioti: Ritz productions include Carousel, Romeo and Juliet, as well as the Christmas tradition of Scrooge

== See also ==
- National Register of Historic Places listings in Camden County, New Jersey
