= The Honeymooners (2003 film) =

2003 Irish film by Karl Golden

The Honeymooners is a 2003 Irish independent comedy film. It was directed and written by Karl Golden. The film stars Jonathan Byrne and Alex Reid as a jilted groom and waitress who make an unlikely alliance and embark on an unusual adventure in rural County Donegal.

== Plot ==
Dubliner David (Jonathan Byrne) is left at the altar by his fiancée Fiona, who meets him to calls off the wedding saying she is reluctant to marry him. Returning to the wedding reception alone, he finds out he has been gifted a holiday cottage in Donegal as a wedding present. Meanwhile, Claire (Alex Reid) is getting ready for work on her birthday when her boyfriend Peter cancels their weekend plans so as to spend time with his wife and children, who do not know he is seeing Claire. She leaves on bad terms with him for her waitressing job.

Leaving the wedding guests, David takes a bottle of champagne and drives to the airport, intending to go on his honeymoon alone, but gets drunk, missing the flight. Remembering the holiday cottage, he tries to convince a taxi driver to take him there, with no success. At work, Claire throws a drink on a customer and is fired. Her manager refuses to pay her. She attempts to take her wages from the till but is prevented from doing so. On the way to her car, she is approached by David who asks her to drive him to Donegal. She begrudgingly accepts after bargaining a price, including a few hundred euro and his wedding ring.

They reach the cottage at night. David invites Claire to stay and to drive her to the bus stop the following day. She asks if she can stay for a few days but he refuses. Later she spies him crying in his bedroom. The next morning, David's car won't start and they are stranded at the cottage. David sprains his hand and Claire uses her pink scarf to bandage it. David unsuccessfully searches for help for his car while Claire visits the beach. Entering a neighbour's cottage, he is ambushed by the elderly owner brandishing a gun, thinking he is being robbed. As his clothes are wet, returning home, David changes into an outfit of Claire's. While drying his clothes, Claire finds a letter in his pocket. She reads and hides it. They have a picnic on a cliff, their relationship softening somewhat with David making her a birthday treat with sparklers. Peter phones Claire but she tells him she does not want to see him. Larry, a neighbour, visits, enquiring about an attempted robbery. He is taken aback by David's feminine attire and the pink scarf on his hand.

David agrees to let Claire stay another night. They drink whiskey and Claire tries to lighten the mood. They dance to an old record but Claire spins David and he falls, breaking a lamp. They have a disagreement and he tells Claire to leave the next morning.

The next day David apologises with a bouquet of wild flowers and tells Claire she can stay as long as she likes. He borrows her phone and calls Fiona to let her know where he is. David and Claire go swimming in the sea. They make a fire and get to know each other better. Claire reveals she removed a part from the car's engine so that she could stay longer. Once the part is back in the engine, David drives Claire to the bus station and on the way they encounter Larry. He invites them for lunch with him and his wife Mary. Mary convinces Claire to try on her wedding dress while Larry shows David his waterbed and tells him that he likes to try on his wife's clothes. David panics and he and Claire leave in a hurry, with Claire still wearing Mary's wedding dress. On the drive, Claire makes a smart comment and David stops the car and tells her to get out. They have a disagreement, ending with Claire throwing the car keys into the distance and walking away. Claire hitches a lift in a farm truck. Meanwhile, Peter unexpectedly arrives at the now empty cottage.

David finds his keys in a field. He pulls in at a rural pub where the farm truck is parked outside. A traditional music session is on in the pub and David sees Claire. David and the truck driver get in an argument when he tries to talk to Claire. Also in the pub is the elderly neighbour. He accuses David of attempted robbery. A pub brawl ensues and to interrupt it, Claire releases a flock of sheep from the truck. The sheep run amok in the pub.

The couple escape the scene and drive back to the cottage where Peter is waiting. He has left his wife and is angry to find Claire with David, assuming they are a couple. David stands up for Claire and Peter punches him in the face. Claire tells Peter to go home and he leaves.

Later, they hear a knock on the door. Larry is hiding behind the door and he tackles David to the ground, accusing him of stealing his wife's wedding dress. Claire takes off the dress and gives it back to Larry. Afterwards, Claire and David share a romantic moment.

The next morning, Claire goes to the shop to get breakfast. In the meantime, Fiona and Ben arrive at the cottage unexpectedly. When Claire returns, Fiona introduces herself as David's fiancé and acts as if they are still together. David doesn't correct her. Fiona tries to write Claire a cheque to pay her back for the weekend's expenses and asks Claire for her wedding ring back. Claire says no. She then reads out the letter she found in David's pocket that reveals Fiona had been seeing her ex-boyfriend Ray.

Claire storms out and Ben goes with her to bring her to the bus. David and Fiona have a talk about their relationship and Fiona asks David to marry her. David says that he can't marry her because he is in love with someone else. He drives to the town in a hurry to catch Claire. He thinks the bus has left and he is dejected, but she is on a different bus that hasn't left yet. They meet and share a romantic moment before walking away together.

In the last scene in Claire's bedroom, he offers her back the wedding ring. She throws it out the window, saying it's just a ring.

== Production ==
According to Variety, though the film does not proclaim to subscribe to Dogme 95 filmmaking movement, it was allegedly shot according to the movement's values. Most of the music in the film was by Ash, a Northern Irish rock band.

== Reception ==
Leslie Felperin for Variety gave a positive review of The Honeymooners, calling the performances engaging and saying it "look[ed] a lot better than one would expect given its reported limited resources", though not impressed by the final act. Caroline Hennessy for RTÉ called it "contrived but entertaining", hailing the use of digital video to "get right into the faces of the actors, which initially gives the film a great sense of immediacy although it does lag in the middle." Hennessy thought it a promising debut for director Golden.
