= Rebecca Jackson Mendoza =

Australian actress, singer, and dancer

- Born: Melbourne, Australia
- Occupations: Actress, singer, dancer
- Relatives: Natalie Mendoza (sister)

Rebecca Jackson Mendoza is an Australian actress, singer, and dancer.

== Early life ==
Rebecca Jackson Mendoza was born in Melbourne, Australia to a Filipino father and an Australian mother of German descent. She first came to national prominence as half of the pop duo Jackson Mendoza, with her sister Natalie. They had minor success releasing two singles that reached the Top 30 in Australia before disbanding in 2000.

== Career ==
Mendoza has had film roles in Howling III (1987) as a dancer, and Star Wars: Episode III – Revenge of the Sith (2005) as Queen Breha Organa. Her stage roles include Australian and German productions of Miss Saigon, Australian productions of Show Boat and Hair, Australian and Japanese productions of We Will Rock You, and Lady Galadriel in the Toronto production of The Lord of the Rings. Mendoza played "Miss Bell" in Fame, Australia.

== Stabbing incident ==
In 1999, Mendoza suffered a stroke after being stabbed in the chest by her estranged husband and fellow Show Boat cast member Marlon Brand, who committed suicide after the attack. The couple had a daughter named Phoenix.

== Filmography ==
=== Film ===
Year	Title	Role	Notes
1987	Howling III	Dancer	
2005	Star Wars: Episode III – Revenge of the Sith	Queen Breha Organa	

== Theatre ==
- Miss Saigon
- Show Boat
- Hair
- We Will Rock You
- The Lord of the Rings (2006) as Lady Galadriel
- Fame: The Musical (2010) as Miss Bell
