= Jackson Mendoza =

Australian pop duo

- Origin: Melbourne, Victoria, Australia
- Genres: Pop, pop rock
- Years active: 1998–2000
- Label: EastWest
- Past members: Natalie Jackson Mendoza; Rebecca Jackson Mendoza

Jackson Mendoza was a short-lived Australian pop duo consisting of the sisters Natalie (born 1978) and Rebecca Jackson Mendoza (born 1973). Jackson Mendoza's first single, "Venus or Mars", was the first song written by the music production team, the Matrix. "Venus or Mars" was released in October 1999, spent ten weeks on the top 50 of the ARIA Singles Chart, and peaked at No. 24. It reached No. 31 in New Zealand. Their follow-up single, "Ordinary Girl" (August 2000), also reached No. 24 in Australia but did not enter the top 50 in New Zealand. The group disbanded soon after with both members pursuing acting careers.

== Discography ==
=== Singles ===
List of singles, with selected chart positions
Title	Year	Peak chart positions	
Title	Year	AUS	NZ
"Venus or Mars"	1999	24	31
"Ordinary Girl"	2000	24	—
