= Natalie Mendoza =

Australian actress (born 1978)

- Born: Natalie Jackson Mendoza; 12 August 1978 (age 48); British Hong Kong
- Occupation: Actress
- Years active: 1995–present
- Spouse: Eliot Kennedy (m. 2006; div. 2010)
- Relatives: Rebecca Jackson Mendoza (sister)

Natalie Jackson Mendoza (born 12 August 1978) is an Australian actress. She is best known for her roles as Jackie Clunes in the British drama series Hotel Babylon (2006–2008) and Juno Kaplan in the horror film The Descent (2005) and its sequel, The Descent Part 2 (2009). Mendoza has also performed in various stage productions across the West End and Broadway, including Miss Saigon (role of "Gigi"), Here Lies Love ("Imelda Marcos"), and Spider-Man: Turn Off The Dark ("Arachne").

== Life and career ==
Mendoza was born in Hong Kong in 1978, to mother Robin Jackson, an Australian television personality of German descent, and father Noel Mendoza, a jazz pianist and arranger of Filipino descent. She is one of six artist siblings. She was raised in Sydney, Melbourne, and Hong Kong. She also went to school and trained in London and New York. She performed in many musicals such as Cats, Miss Saigon, The Music of Lloyd Webber Concert Tour (understudying Sarah Brightman), Oh What A Night, 25th Annual Putnam County Spelling Bee, as the lead Frugue girl in Sweet Charity, and took the role of Eponine in the 10th Anniversary Australasian Tour of Les Miserables.

In 1998, Mendoza formed the band Jackson Mendoza with her sister Rebecca. They had No 1 chart success and signed internationally to Virgin Records, releasing two singles that reached the Top 10 music charts in Australia. They disbanded in 2000.

Mendoza appeared in Golden Globe award-winning film Moulin Rouge!, as the lead dancer China Doll. After Moulin Rouge! she began working on a solo album in Melbourne and signed a three-picture deal with Miramax. She filmed several US series including Farscape and played Liat in ABC's South Pacific opposite Harry Connick Jr. and Glenn Close.

In 2003, Mendoza returned to England to focus her attention on acting. She trained as an actor at the prestigious Bristol Old Vic Theatre School, training in Classical Theatre. Mendoza appeared on stage in many classical theatre and modern theatre productions, including Coup d'État at MTC, Five Kinds of Silence, The Vagina Monologues, Macbeth, Romeo and Juliet, and The Importance of Being Earnest.

In 2005, Mendoza was cast in a lead role Juno in the film The Descent, which was directed by Neil Marshall.

In 2006, she performed in the series regular role of Jackie Clunes in the BBC1 British drama series Hotel Babylon. Mendoza appeared in seasons 1-3 of the series.

In 2007, Mendoza guest-starred in the Doctor Who audio dramas Absolution and The Girl Who Never Was. She filmed The Descent Part 2 sequel and horror film Surviving Evil, which she wrote the title track for, "Alone Again". She workshopped the lead role of Molly in Matthew Warchus' production of Ghost which was based on the original screenplay by Bruce Rubin.

In 2010, Mendoza originated the role of Arachne in the Broadway musical Spider-Man: Turn Off the Dark. After playing a handful of preview performances, she was forced to leave after an injury occurred backstage.

Mendoza won her first film festival entry as best director, best writer, and best film at the 72-hour film festival in Los Angeles 2011.

From 2017 to 2020, Mendoza guest starred in various television productions, including Blue Bloods, Holby City, and McDonald & Dodds.

Mendoza appeared in the Leos Carax-directed musical film Annette, starring Adam Driver and Marion Cotillard.

In 2021, she joined the cast of the musical Moulin Rouge! on Broadway, playing the lead role of Satine.

== Filmography ==
=== Film ===
| Year | Title | Role | Notes |
|---|---|---|---|
| 2000 | Muggers | Tran | |
| 2001 | Moulin Rouge! | China Doll | |
| 2003 | Horseplay | Jade | |
| 2003 | Code 46 | Sphinx Receptionist | |
| 2005 | The Descent | Juno Kaplan | |
| 2005 | The Great Raid | Mina | |
| 2009 | Surviving Evil (aka Evil Island) | Cecilia 'Chill' Reyes | |
| 2009 | The Descent Part 2 | Juno Kaplan | |
| 2021 | Annette | Six Women Accuser Chorus Member | |

=== Television ===
| Year | Title | Role | Notes |
|---|---|---|---|
| 1998 | Wildside | Sim | Episode: 1.29 |
| 1999 | Fearless | Jade | TV movie |
| 1999 | Farscape | Lishala | Episode: Jeremiah Crichton |
| 1999–2000 | BeastMaster | Kyra | 7 episodes |
| 2001 | South Pacific | Liat | TV movie |
| 2001 | Hard Knox | Ellie | TV movie |
| 2006–2008 | Hotel Babylon | Jackie Clunes | 21 episodes |
| 2012 | Midsomer Murders | Sasha Fleetwood | Episode: The Dark Rider |
| 2012 | Americana | Wendy Law-Soulter | Pilot |
| 2018 | Blue Bloods | Lindsay Stewart | Episode: Tale of Two Cities |
| 2019 | Holby City | Sunny Lin | Episode: Don't Leave Me |
| 2020 | McDonald & Dodds | Mathilde Crockett | Episode: The Fall of The House of Crockett |
| 2022 | Tom Clancy's Jack Ryan | Seiko Arnell | Episode: Druz'ya I Vragi |

== Theatre ==
| Year | Production | Role | Venue | Director |
|---|---|---|---|---|
| 2010 | Spider-Man: Turn off the Dark | Arachne | Lyric Theatre, NYC | Julie Taymor |
| 2013 | Arms of Fire | Josephina | Chester Theatre Company | Byam Stevens |
| 2014 | Here Lies Love | Imelda Marcos | Royal National Theatre | Alex Timbers |
| 2015 | Miss Saigon | Gigi | Prince Edward Theatre | Laurence Connor |
| 2021 | Moulin Rouge! | Satine | Al Hirschfeld Theatre | Alex Timbers |
