= Alex Reid (actress) =

English actress

- Born: Penzance, Cornwall, England
- Occupation: Actress
- Years active: 2001–present

Alex Reid is a British actress, trained at the Webber Douglas Academy of Dramatic Art.

== Acting ==
She portrayed the probation officer Sally in E4's Misfits and also the character of Captain Caroline Walshe in series 1 and 2 of ITV's SAS drama Ultimate Force.

She starred as Mercer in 2001's Arachnid and portrayed Beth O'Brien in 2005's The Descent and was featured in Guinea Pigs. She reprised her role in The Descent Part 2 for a cameo.

== Filmography ==
=== Film ===
Year	Title	Role	Notes
2001	Arachnid	Loren Mercer	
2001	Last Orders	Young Pam	
2001	Summer Rain	Club Torso	
2003	The Honeymooners	Claire	
2005	The Descent	Beth O'Brien	
2006	Wilderness	Louise	
2006	The Descent: 'Beneath the Scenes'	Herself	Video Documentary Short
2007	The Midnight Drives	Sophie	
2007	The Tailor	Antastazia	Short
2007	Jetsam	Grace	
2008	Love Me Still	Gemma Ronson	
2009	One Hundred Mornings	Hannah	
2009	The Descent Part 2	Beth O'Brien	
2010	Deeper and Darker: The Making of the 'Descent Part 2'	Herself	Video Documentary Short
2011	Pork	Ella	Short
2012	The Facility	Joni	
2013	To The Sea	Jenna	Short
2014	I Am Soldier	Captain Dawn Canterbury	
2017	Joanne	Joanne	Post-Production
2020	A Beautiful Death	Catherine	Dantalion Film
2022	The Princess	The Queen	

=== Television ===
Year	Title	Role	Notes
2001	Relic Hunter	Simone	1 Episode
2002–03	Ultimate Force	Captain Caroline Walshe	11 Episodes
2003	Blue Dove	Nell Brennan	Mini Series
2004	Casualty	Shelley Brooks	1 Episode
2005	The Government Inspector	Claire	Television Movie
2006	Sorted	Pippa	1 Episode
2007	Mobile	Stacy Cox	1 Episode
2007	Life on Mars	Layla Dylan	1 Episode
2009–2011	Misfits	Sally	8 Episodes
2015	Vera	Karen Pryor	1 Episode
2016	The Tunnel	Helen	2 Episodes
2018	Collateral	Amanda Hall	2 episodes
2020	Unorthodox	Leah	4 episodes

== Videogames ==
year	Title	Role	Notes
2017	Planet of the Apesː Last Frontier	Jess Ross	Voice
