= I Am Soldier =

- I Am Soldier DVD Cover
- Directed by: Ronnie Thompson
- Written by: Ronnie Thompson
- Produced by: James Harris; Mark Lane
- Starring: Tom Hughes; Noel Clarke; Alex Reid; George Russo
- Cinematography: Tim Sidell
- Edited by: Tommy Boulding
- Music by: Paul Arnold; Andrew Barnabas
- Production companies: Tea Shop Productions; Lionsgate UK
- Distributed by: SC Films International
- Release date: 17 March 2014
- Running time: 84 minutes
- Country: United Kingdom
- Language: English

I Am Soldier is a 2014 British action thriller film directed by Ronnie Thompson and starring Tom Hughes, Noel Clarke and Alex Reid. The film follows Mickey and JJ as they attempt the Special Air Service (SAS) selection.

== Plot ==
The film follows Mickey Tomlinson (Tom Hughes) and JJ (George Russo) as they attempt the selection course for the SAS. Mickey claims to be a military chef, but suffers from flashbacks. JJ is attempting the test for the second time (only two attempts are allowed). After a series of endurance tests, the original 200 candidates are whittled down to 36. The remaining candidates undergo an "Escape & Evasion & Tactical Questioning" exercise, released into the wild without rations and wearing only vintage World War II cloaks. Mickey admits to JJ he was a pathfinder in the Parachute Regiment, and had a friend who was killed in a parachute accident. They are captured, tortured and interrogated, but do not reveal anything except their name, rank and service number. After a final parachute jump, they pass selection. Mickey and JJ are assigned to a counter-terrorism team. They make an assault on the warehouse of a small Bosnian Muslim terrorist organisation. They defeat the terrorists, but JJ is killed.

== Cast ==
- Tom Hughes as Mickey
- Noel Clarke as Carter
- Alex Reid as Dawn
- George Russo as JJ
- Miranda Raison as Stella
- Josh Myers as Chris

== Reception ==
The film was not widely reviewed, with zero reviews on Rotten Tomatoes.
