= A United Kingdom =

2016 film by Amma Asante

- Theatrical release poster
- Directed by: Amma Asante
- Screenplay by: Guy Hibbert
- Based on: Colour Bar by Susan Williams
- Produced by: Brunson Green; Charlie Mason; Rick McCallum; Cameron McCracken; Justin Moore-Lewy; David Oyelowo
- Starring: David Oyelowo; Rosamund Pike; Terry Pheto; Jack Davenport; Tom Felton; Abena Ayivor; Vusi Kunene
- Cinematography: Sam McCurdy
- Edited by: Jonathan Amos; Jon Gregory
- Music by: Patrick Doyle
- Production companies: BBC Films; British Film Institute; Ingenious Media; Pathé
- Distributed by: 20th Century Fox (United Kingdom); Pathé Distribution (France); Fox Searchlight Pictures (United States)
- Release dates: 9 September 2016 (TIFF); 25 November 2016 (United Kingdom); 10 February 2017 (United States)
- Running time: 111 minutes
- Countries: Czech Republic; France; United Kingdom; United States
- Languages: English; Tswana
- Budget: $14 million
- Box office: $14.4 million

A United Kingdom is a 2016 biographical romantic drama film directed by Amma Asante and written by Guy Hibbert, based on the true-life romance of Seretse Khama, heir to the throne of the Bangwato Tribe in Serowe – one of many tribes found in then Bechuanaland Protectorate – with his wife Ruth Williams Khama. David Oyelowo and Rosamund Pike portray Seretse and Ruth, respectively.

It was screened at the 2016 Toronto International Film Festival, and was the opening film at the 60th London Film Festival.

== Plot ==
The film is based on the true story of the heir to the throne of Bechuanaland, Seretse Khama of the Bamangwato people, who studied law in London immediately after World War II. There he meets an Englishwoman, Ruth Williams, whom he eventually marries in 1948, despite the protests of both their families and opposition from the British government, which is concerned about relations with South Africa and the stability of the entire region of southern Africa. The National Party government in South Africa fears that the marriage of a black king to a white woman in neighbouring Bechuanaland will inspire unrest, as it was in the process of making such a marriage illegal, and demands that the British government prevents the marriage, as do the governments of South West Africa and Rhodesia.

Khama's uncle, the Regent, also asks Khama to end his marriage and instead marry a Bamangwato princess, which Khama rejects. The British administrators use the dispute to argue that the marriage is causing unrest. Seretse discovers that the British have allowed a US mining corporation to prospect for precious stones, and is eager to make sure that, if anything is found, the exploitation of the country's resources should solely be done by the people of Bechuanaland.

Khama wants his people's support and wins their backing, upon which the British government decides to exile him. Meanwhile, Ruth gives birth to their baby and becomes accepted by the local people by "walking the road with them". When the British want to replace the king with an administrator, the tribe refuses to convene the necessary meeting. The British prime minister, Clement Attlee, tells backbencher Tony Benn that Britain needs South Africa's gold and destroying the Khamas' marriage is a price worth paying. Meanwhile, diamonds are found in Bechuanaland and Khama ensures the British government acknowledges their sovereign ownership by the Bechuana people.

Winston Churchill promises, if elected, to lift Khama's exile term of five years, but instead makes it permanent. However, powerful people in London and the US government support Khama's case. Meanwhile, apartheid develops in South Africa and begins to overshadow Bechuanaland as well. Eventually, with the help of pressure from local people, he is allowed to return to Bechuanaland and negotiates its independence from the British. Khama shows his uncle a leaked British government document showing he is qualified to be king, and that British government hostility is based only on opposition from South Africa. A postscript reveals that Khama was elected as the first president of present-day Botswana, that their son becomes the country's fourth elected president in 2008 and that Ruth and Khama are buried together on a hilltop overlooking Serowe village, where they had lived for the remainder of their lives.

== Cast ==
- David Oyelowo as Seretse Khama
- Rosamund Pike as Ruth Williams Khama
- Terry Pheto as Naledi Khama, Seretse's younger sister
- Vusi Kunene as Tshekedi Khama, Seretse's uncle, who is Regent of the Bangwato Kingdom
- Abena Ayivor as Ella Khama, Tshekedi's wife and Seretse's aunt
- Anton Lesser as Clement Attlee, Prime Minister of the United Kingdom
- Jack Davenport as Alistair Canning, the British government representative in Southern Africa
- Jack Lowden as Tony Benn
- Nicholas Rowe as Fenner Brockway
- Tom Felton as Rufus Lancaster
- Charlotte Hope as Olivia Lancaster
- Nicholas Lyndhurst as George Williams, Ruth's father
- Anastasia Hille as Dot Williams, Ruth's mother
- Laura Carmichael as Muriel Williams-Sanderson, Ruth's sister
- Jessica Oyelowo as Lady Lilly Canning

== Production ==
Pike joined the cast in May 2015, with Asante joining shortly afterwards. In September 2015, Asante revealed that shooting would be split between Botswana and London, and that it would begin in October in preparation for a 2016 release coinciding with the 50th anniversary of independence in Botswana.

In October 2015, Jack Davenport and Tom Felton joined the cast. In November 2015, some filming took place around Hyde Park/Kensington Gardens including Imperial College Union. The cinematographer was Sam McCurdy and the production designer was Simon Bowles.

== Director ==
Amma Asante is a British director, screenwriter, and former actress, born on 13 September 1969, in London, England. She grew up in a working-class family of Ghanaian and British descent. Asante started her career as a child actress, starring in the BBC TV series Grange Hill. Later, she transitioned into writing and directing. Asante's debut feature film, A Way of Life (2004), premiered at the Toronto International Film Festival and won the BAFTA Carl Foreman Award for best debut by a British filmmaker. She gained further critical acclaim for her work on the period dramas Belle (2013) and A United Kingdom (2016). Asante has also directed episodes of TV series such as The Handmaid's Tale, Mrs America, and Lovecraft Country. In 2017, she was awarded an MBE (Member of the Order of the British Empire) for her services to film. Asante is known for her focus on exploring themes of identity, race, and politics in her works.

== Release ==
The film had its world premiere at the Toronto International Film Festival on 9 September 2016. It will also screen at the BFI London Film Festival on 6 October 2016. Shortly after, Fox Searchlight Pictures acquired U.S distribution rights to the film.

The film was released in the United Kingdom on 25 November 2016. It was scheduled to be released in the United States on 17 February 2017, but was pushed up to 10 February.

== Reception ==
=== Box office ===
A United Kingdom grossed $3,902,185 in the United States and Canada and $10,557,145 in other countries for a worldwide total of $14,459,330, against a production budget of $14,000,000.

=== Critical response ===
On review aggregator website Rotten Tomatoes, the film has an approval rating of 84% based on 164 reviews, with an average rating of 6.8/10. The website's critical consensus reads, "Well-acted, solidly crafted, and all-around worthy, A United Kingdom presents an absorbing look at a singular true-life love story." On Metacritic, the film has a weighted average score of 65 out of 100, based on 41 critics, indicating "generally favourable reviews".

Glen Kenny, in The New York Times, described the filmmaking as "staid" but with "an acute sense of pace". He was complimentary about the performances and described Oyelowo's as "remarkable, genuinely riveting work". In Time Out, Tom Huddleston wrote that "David Oyelowo and Rosamund Pike are strong in this compelling and moving, if basic, true-life tale" but that the film "is just a little too cosy and sentimental for its own good."

The film was nominated for several awards, winning many. At the 2016 BFI London Film Festival, it won the Festival's Best Film award. The film also received a nomination for Best British Film at the 70th British Academy Film Awards. At the 10th African American Film Critics Association (AAFCA) Awards, the film won the award for Best World Cinema. It was also nominated for Best International Independent Film at the 21st British Independent Film Awards. Overall, A United Kingdom was well-received by critics and audiences alike.
