= Simon Bowles =

British production designer

- Simon Bowles
- Born: 7 June 1971 (age 55); London, England
- Occupation: Production designer
- Years active: 1993–present
- Children: Indy Bowles; Pippa Bowles

Simon Bowles (7 June 1971, London) is a British feature film production designer. Bowles has worked with directors Neil Marshall, Armando Iannucci, Amma Asante, Oliver Parker, Roger Michell and Edgar Wright and . He trained at the Bristol Old Vic Theatre School.

== Career ==
Bowles designed the underground maze of caves built at Pinewood Studios for The Descent, which won accolades at the Evening Standard British Film Awards, Empire Awards, British Independent Film Awards and Philadelphia Film Festival. Reviews credited to Bowles such as "cave sets by production designer Simon Bowles look just like the real thing" and "Simon Bowles’ beautifully designed cave sets conjure a world of subterranean darkness".

In 2012 Simon Bowles designed Roger Michell's "Hyde Park on Hudson" starring Bill Murray, set in 1930s Upstate New York about a British royal family visiting the US and their stay with Franklin Roosevelt, shot entirely in the UK. Bowles's work was mentioned in reviews; "handsomely decked out with a sharp eye for telling eye for production design" by Todd McCarthy in The Hollywood Reporter and "Hyde Park on Hudson boasts top-notch production design" by Geoffrey MacNabb in The Independent and "excellent production design from Simon Bowles completes this dreamy, impeccable film" by Clare Stuart, BFI. Bowles went on to win the British Film Designers Guild award for his design of this film.

Simon Bowles designed Amma Asante's "Belle (2013 film)" set in 18th-century Kenwood House, London and "Pride (2014 film)" about English gay and lesbian group supporting the striking miners in the 1980s. Both films received rave reviews and many awards including Best Feature Film at the 2014 British Independent Film Awards and nominations at the 2015 BAFTA awards for Pride.

Between 2013 and 2015 Simon Bowles was the elected chairman of The British Film Designers Guild which represents and promotes the creative talent of Production Designers and the art department in the British film industry.

Simon Bowles worked with Amma Asante again on "A United Kingdom" which tells the true story of the relationship between Seretse Khama, the chief to be of the Bamangwato tribe in the British colony of Bechuanaland in the late 1940s, and a white, middle-class Englishwoman, Ruth Williams. It stars David Oyelowo and Rosamund Pike directed by Amma Asante produced by Rick McCallum. It was released in the UK in October 2016, US release in February 2017.

Simon Bowles won at the British Film Designers Guild awards in 2019 for his work on Universal Pictures Johnny English Strikes Again starring Rowan Atkinson.

Bowles designed three movies in succession set in New York City ; The Son (2022 film) written and directed by Florian Zeller, starring Laura Dern, Hugh Jackman and Anthony Hopkins, Apartment 7A directed by Natalie Erika James and the hugely successful A Quiet Place: Day One created by John Krasinski, written and directed by Michael Sarnoski.

== Filmography ==
=== Production designer ===
- Primate (film) (2025)
- A Quiet Place: Day One (2024)
- Apartment 7A (2024)
- The Son (2022)
- Avenue 5 (TV series) (2022)
- Avenue 5 (TV series) (2020)
- Crooked House (film) (2018)
- Johnny English Strikes Again (2018)
- A United Kingdom (2016)
- Spooks: The Greater Good (2015)
- Dad's Army (2015 film) (2016)
- Pride (2014 film) (2014)
- Belle (2013 film) (2014)
- Hyde Park on Hudson (2012)
- The Reckoning (TV series) (2011)
- Centurion (2010)
- The Deep (TV series) (2010)
- The Descent Part 2 (2009)
- Eden Lake (2008)
- Doomsday (2007)
- Straightheads (2007)
- The Descent (2005)
- Cold and Dark (2005)
- Killing Hitler (2003) (TV)
- Dog Soldiers (2002)
- The Lost Battalion (2001)
- The Enemy (2001)
- Lighthouse (2000)
- Wired (1997)
- Virtual Terror (1996)
- A Fistful of Fingers (1994)

=== Commercials ===
- Stella Artois
- Playstation
- Xbox(for which Bowles won silver at the British Television Advertising Awards craft awards in 2026)
- Volkswagen
- McDonald's
- Sainsbury's (for which Bowles won gold at the British Television Advertising Awards craft awards in 2016)
- Heinz
- Hula Hoops
- Xerox
- EuroMillions
- Nescafe
- Npower (United Kingdom)
- The Telegraph
- Coca-Cola
- Kellogg's
- RSA Insurance Group

== Awards ==
- Won at British Film Designers Guild Awards in 2025 - A Quiet Place: Day One in the category Best Production Design in a Contemporary Studio Feature Film.
- Nominated at the American Art Directors Guild Awards in 2025 - Apartment 7A in the category Best Production Design in a Period Television Movie.
- Won at British Film Designers Guild Awards in 2023 - The Son in the category Best Production Design in a Contemporary Feature Film.
- Won at British Film Designers Guild Awards in 2021 - Avenue 5 in the category Best Production Design in a International Television Drama.
- Won at British Film Designers Guild Awards in 2019 - Johnny English Strikes Again in the category Best Production Design in a Contemporary Feature Film.
- Won gold at the British Television Advertising Awards craft awards in 2016.
- Nominated at British Film Designers Guild Awards in 2016 - A United Kingdom in the category Best Production Design in a Feature Film.
- Nominated at British Film Designers Guild Awards in 2016 - Dad's Army in the category Best Production Design in a Feature Film.
- Nominated at British Film Designers Guild Awards in 2014 - Belle in the category Best Production Design in a Feature Film.
- Won at British Film Designers Guild Awards in 2013 - Hyde Park on Hudson in the category Best Production Design in a Feature Film.
- Nominated at British Independent Film Awards in 1999 - Best Newcomer.
