= Jon Harris (film editor) =

English film editor (born 1967)

- Born: 11 July 1967 (age 59); Sheffield, Yorkshire, England
- Occupation: Film editor

Jon Harris (born 11 July 1967) is an English film editor known for his work on Snatch (2000), Layer Cake (2004), The Descent (2005), Stardust (2007), 127 Hours (2010), The Woman in Black (2012), T2 Trainspotting (2017), Yesterday (2019), The Dig (2021), Speak No Evil (2024), Long Day's Journey Into Night (2025), 28 Years Later (2025) and Clayface (2026).

He was nominated for an Academy Award for Best Film Editing for 127 Hours (2010).

== Career ==
Harris received a British Independent Film Award (BIFA) for Best Technical Achievement 2005 for his work on Neil Marshall's The Descent (2005).

In 2011 Harris was nominated for an Academy Award (Oscar) and a British Academy of Film and Television Arts (BAFTA) Award for his editing work on Danny Boyle's 127 Hours (2010) and subsequently became a member of the American Academy of Motion Picture Arts and Sciences (AMPAS). He has a further 13 nominations including a Saturn Award Best Editing nomination for his editing work on Kingsman: The Secret Service (2015) alongside Eddie Hamilton.

== Filmography ==
Editor

- Clayface (2026)
- 28 Years Later (2025)
- Speak No Evil (2024)
- The Unlikely Pilgrimage of Harold Fry (2023)
- Pistol (2022)
- The Dig (2021)
- Yesterday (2019)
- Darkness Visible (2019)
- Tell It to the Bees (2018)
- McMafia (2018)
- T2 Trainspotting (2017)
- Bastille Day (2016)
- Kingsman: The Secret Service (2014)
- The Two Faces of January (2014)
- Christmas in a Day (2013)
- Trance (2013)
- The Woman in Black (2012)
- 127 Hours (2010)
- Kick-Ass (2010)
- The Descent Part 2 (2009) (Also director)
- Eden Lake (2008)
- Stardust (2007)
- Starter for 10 (2006)
- Being Cyrus (2005)
- The Descent (2005)
- Layer Cake (2004)
- The Calcium Kid (2004)
- dot the i (2003)
- Ripley's Game (2002)
- Snatch (2000)

Additional editor

- Unlocked (2017)
- Swallows and Amazons (2016)
- Paddington (2014)

Assistant editor

- The Secret Agent (1996)
- When Saturday Comes (1996)
- The Turnaround (1995)

Assistant director

- Solitaire for 2 (1995)

Supervising editor

- Access All Areas (2017)

Executive producer

- Filth (2013)

Associate Producer

- On the Count of Three (2021)
