= Saskia Mulder =

Dutch actress (born 1973)

- Born: 18 May 1973 (age 53); The Hague, Netherlands
- Occupation: actress
- Years active: 1994–present

Saskia Mulder (born 18 May 1973 in the Hague) is a Dutch film and television actress. She is the younger sister of model Karen Mulder.

== Career ==
Mulder appeared in The Beach and the British horror movie The Descent. She also starred as Fist in the Channel 4 series, The Book Group. She made an appearance as "Francesca" in series 1, episode 1 of Jonathan Creek.
