= The Descent =

2005 film directed by Neil Marshall

- Theatrical release poster
- Directed by: Neil Marshall
- Written by: Neil Marshall
- Produced by: Christian Colson
- Starring: Shauna Macdonald; Natalie Mendoza; Alex Reid; Saskia Mulder; Nora-Jane Noone; MyAnna Buring
- Cinematography: Sam McCurdy
- Edited by: Jon Harris
- Music by: David Julyan
- Production companies: Celador Films; Northmen Productions
- Distributed by: Pathé Distribution
- Release dates: 6 July 2005 (Dead by Dawn); 8 July 2005 (United Kingdom)
- Running time: 100 minutes
- Country: United Kingdom
- Language: English
- Budget: £3.5 million
- Box office: $57.1 million

The Descent is a 2005 British horror film written and directed by Neil Marshall. The film stars actresses Shauna Macdonald, Natalie Mendoza, Alex Reid, Saskia Mulder, Nora-Jane Noone and MyAnna Buring. The plot follows six women who enter an uncharted cave system and struggle to survive against the monstrous creatures inside.

Filming took place in the United Kingdom. Exterior scenes were filmed at Ashridge Park, Hertfordshire, and in Scotland. Because the filmmakers considered it too dangerous and time-consuming to shoot in an actual cave, interior scenes were filmed on sets built at Pinewood Studios near London and designed by Simon Bowles.

The Descent opened in cinemas in the United Kingdom on 8 July 2005. It had its North American premiere at the 2006 Sundance Film Festival and was released in the United States on 4 August 2006. The film received positive reviews with praise for the performances, cinematography and Marshall's direction. It was also a box-office success, grossing $57.1 million worldwide against a £3.5 million budget. Since its release, it has been regarded as one of the best horror films of the 2000s. A sequel, titled The Descent Part 2, was released in 2009.

== Plot ==
Sarah is picked up by her husband Paul and daughter Jessica after a whitewater rafting trip with her thrill-seeking friends Juno and Beth. Paul is distracted on the ride home, causing a car crash that kills both him and Jessica. Sarah awakens in the hospital and collapses after Beth tells her about their deaths.

One year later, Sarah, Juno, and Beth reunite for a spelunking adventure in the Appalachian Mountains of North Carolina along with sisters Sam and Rebecca, and newcomer Holly. They hike to a mountain cave entrance and descend. Making their way through the caves, Sarah becomes stuck in a narrow tunnel, but manages to escape before it collapses, blocking the way back. Juno admits that she has led the group into an unexplored cave system instead of the mapped one they had filed with local authorities, which means that a rescue party would be unable to locate them.

The group searches for an exit and discovers old climbing equipment and a cave painting that suggests a way out. Holly, thinking she sees sunlight, runs ahead but falls into a hole and breaks her leg. As the others help her, Sarah wanders off and sees a pale, humanoid creature drinking from a pool before it scampers away. Later, they come across a den of animal bones and are suddenly attacked by a creature they call a "Crawler", which kills Holly. Sarah runs, but falls down a hole and is knocked unconscious. Juno, trying to stop Holly's body from being dragged away, kills a Crawler with her pickaxe, but then accidentally stabs Beth in the neck after being startled. Beth grabs Juno's pendant as she collapses and a traumatized Juno flees.

Sarah awakens in a den of human and animal carcasses, and sees Holly's body being eaten by Crawlers. Juno discovers cave markings left by previous explorers, pointing to a potential exit from the caves. She finds and saves Sam and Rebecca from a Crawler, and Sam deduces that the creatures are blind and hunt by sound. Sarah finds a dying Beth, who reveals both that Juno stabbed her and that Juno's pendant was a gift from Paul, confirming Sarah's suspicions that Juno and Paul were having an affair. Beth begs Sarah to end her suffering, and Sarah reluctantly kills her with a rock. Sarah then encounters several Crawlers and manages to kill them all, falling into a blood-filled pool in the process.

Elsewhere, Juno, Sam, and Rebecca are pursued by a large group of Crawlers. They reach a chasm, and Sam tries to climb across but is attacked by a Crawler on the ceiling. It rips out her throat, but she kills it before bleeding to death. Rebecca is dragged away and disemboweled as Juno flees. Juno later reunites with Sarah and lies about seeing Beth die. After defeating a group of Crawlers near an exit, Sarah confronts Juno, revealing the pendant, and her knowledge of Beth's fate and the affair with Paul. She then stabs Juno in the leg with a pickaxe and leaves her to die as a horde of Crawlers approaches. Juno removes the pickaxe from her leg to hold back the Crawlers, and is heard screaming as Sarah escapes.

Sarah falls into a hole and loses consciousness. When she wakes, she sees sunlight and clambers up a bone-strewn slope to escape the cave. She reaches her car and speeds away, eventually pulling over to break down in tears. After a truck passes, she vomits out of the window. When she sits back up, she hallucinates seeing a bloodied Juno beside her, and screams.

In the UK version, Sarah awakens, still in the cave, and has a vision of Jessica, smiling as the sounds of approaching Crawlers grow louder.

== Cast ==
- Shauna Macdonald as Sarah
- Natalie Mendoza as Juno
- Alex Reid as Beth
- MyAnna Buring as Sam
- Saskia Mulder as Rebecca
- Nora-Jane Noone as Holly
- Oliver Milburn as Paul
- Molly Kayll as Jessica

== Production ==
After Neil Marshall's film Dog Soldiers (2002) was a moderate success, he received numerous requests to direct other horror films. Initially wary of being typecast as a horror film director, he eventually agreed to make The Descent, emphasizing, "They are very different films."

=== Casting ===
Filmmakers originally planned for the cast to be both male and female, but Neil Marshall's business partner realized that horror films rarely have all-female casts. Defying convention, Marshall cast all women, and to avoid making them clichéd, he solicited advice from his female friends. He explained the difference, "The women discuss how they feel about the situation, which the soldiers in Dog Soldiers would never have done." He also gave the characters different accents to enable the audience to tell them apart in the dimly lit caves and to establish a more "cosmopolitan feel" than the British marketing of Dog Soldiers.

The cast included Shauna Macdonald as Sarah, Natalie Mendoza as Juno, Alex Reid as Beth, Saskia Mulder as Rebecca, MyAnna Buring as Sam, Nora-Jane Noone as Holly, Oliver Milburn as Paul, and Molly Kayll as Jessica. Craig Conway portrayed one of the film's crawlers, Scar.

=== Filming ===
While The Descent is set in North America, the film was shot entirely in the United Kingdom. According to Marshall, "It was a mixture of amazing sets by Simon Bowles, a couple of matte paintings and a miniature set built by Leigh Took – the water pouring down the waterfall wasn’t water, it’s salt." Exterior scenes were filmed in Scotland, and interior scenes were filmed in sets built at Pinewood Studios, near London. The cave was built at Pinewood because filmmakers considered it too dangerous and time-consuming to shoot in an actual cave. Set pieces were reused with care, and filmmakers sought to limit lighting to the sources the characters bring with them into the cave, such as helmet lights.

Marshall cited the films The Texas Chain Saw Massacre, The Thing, and Deliverance as influences in establishing tension in The Descent, saying "We really wanted to ramp up the tension slowly, unlike all the American horror films you see now. They take it up to 11 in the first few minutes and then simply can't keep it up. We wanted to show all these terrible things in the cave: dark, drowning, claustrophobia. Then, when it couldn't get any worse, make it worse." Marshall said at the 63rd Venice International Film Festival that he was inspired by older Italian horror films, in particular, those by Dario Argento and Lucio Fulci.

Production designer Simon Bowles built a network of caverns and tunnels for The Descent at Pinewood Studios. Much of the cave system was constructed from self-expanding foam, which provided a rock-like surface texture and could be cut away to give the camera and lighting crew access.

Production of The Descent competed with a big-budget American film that had a similar premise, The Cave. The Descent was originally scheduled to be released in the United Kingdom by November 2005 or February 2006, but The Cave began filming six months before its competitor. The filmmakers of The Descent decided to release their film before The Cave, so they fast-tracked production to complete by the end of February 2005.

=== Editing ===
The Descent was released in North America with approximately one minute cut from the end. In the American cut, Sarah escapes from the cave and sees Juno, but the film does not cut back to the cave. The 4 August 2006 issue of Entertainment Weekly reported that the ending was trimmed because American viewers did not like its "uber-hopeless finale". Lionsgate marketing chief Tim Palen said, "It's a visceral ride, and by the time you get to the ending you're drained. [Director Neil] Marshall had a number of endings in mind when he shot the film, so he was open [to making a switch]". Marshall compared the change to the ending of The Texas Chain Saw Massacre, saying, "Just because she gets away, does that make it a happy ending?" The ending is featured on DVD as an "unrated cut" in the United States.

== Creature design ==
In the film, the women encounter subterranean creatures referred to as crawlers by the production crew. Marshall described the crawlers as cavemen who have stayed underground. He explained, "They've evolved in this environment over thousands of years. They've adapted perfectly to thrive in the cave. They've lost their eyesight, they have acute hearing and smell and function perfectly in the pitch black. They're expert climbers, so they can go up any rock face and that is their world." Filmmakers kept the crawler design hidden from the actresses until their characters encountered the creatures, to allow for natural tension.

=== Conception ===
Marshall first chose to have a dark cave as the setting for The Descent then decided to add the element of the crawlers, describing them as "something that could get the women, something human, but not quite". The crawlers were depicted as cavemen who for some reason never left the caves and evolved in the dark. Marshall included mothers and children in the colony of creatures, defining his vision, "It is a colony and I thought that was far more believable than making them the classic monsters. If they had been all male, it would have made no sense, so I wanted to create a more realistic context for them. I wanted to have this very feral, very primal species living underground, but I wanted to make them human. I didn't want to make them aliens because humans are the scariest things."

The crawlers were designed by Paul Hyett, a makeup and prosthetics creator. Production designer Simon Bowles said that the crawler design started out as "wide-eyed and more creature-like", but shifted toward a more human appearance. They originally had pure white skin, but the look was adjusted to seem grubbier. The skin was originally phosphorescent in appearance, but the effect was too bright and reflective in the darkened set, so the adjustment was made for them to blend in with shadows. Marshall barred the film's cast from seeing the actors in full crawler make-up until their first appearance on screen. Actress Natalie Mendoza said of the effect, "When the moment came, I nearly wet my pants! I was running around afterwards, laughing in this hysterical way and trying to hide the fact that I was pretty freaked out. Even after that scene, we never really felt comfortable with them."

The crawlers reappear in The Descent Part 2, a sequel by Jon Harris with Marshall as executive producer. For the sequel, Hyett improved the camouflaging ability of the crawlers' skin tones to deliver better scares, saying, "Jon wanted them more viciously feral, inbred, scarred and deformed, with rows of sharklike teeth for ripping flesh." A charnel house was designed for the crawlers as well as a set that the crew called the "Crawler Crapper".

=== Description ===
Rene Rodriguez of The Miami Herald described the crawlers as "blind, snarling cave-dwellers, looking much like Gollum's bigger kin". Douglas Tseng of The Straits Times also noted that the crawlers looked like cross between Gollum and the vampiric Reapers from Blade II. David Germain of the Associated Press noted the crawlers, "have evolved to suit their environment—eyes blind because of the darkness in which they dwell, skin slimy and gray, ears batlike to channel their super-hearing." The crawlers are sexually dimorphic, with males being completely bald, whilst females sport thick dark hair on their heads. They are nocturnal hunters which surface from their caves to hunt for prey and bring the spoils of their hunts to their caverns.

== Marketing ==
The skull of women motif used in some advertising material is based on Philippe Halsman's In Voluptas Mors photograph.

The film's United Kingdom marketing campaign was disrupted by the London bombings in July 2005. Advertisements on London's public transport system (including the bus that had exploded) had included posters that carried the quote, "Outright terror... bold and brilliant", and depicted a terrified woman screaming in a tunnel. The film's theatrical distributor in the UK, Pathé, recalled the posters from their placement in the London Underground and reworked the campaign to exclude the word "terror" from advertised reviews of The Descent. Pathé also distributed the new versions to TV and radio stations. The distributor's marketing chief, Anna Butler, said of the new approach, "We changed tack to concentrate on the women involved all standing together and fighting back. That seemed to chime with the prevailing mood of defiance that set in the weekend after the bombs." Marshall stated in an interview that "Shauna was pretty upset about it; it was on newspapers all across the county" and cites the attacks as harming the film's box office, as "people were still trapped underground in reality, so no one really wanted to go see a film about people trapped underground...".

== Release ==
=== Reception ===
...When it was released in July [2005], this claustrophobic story of six women who stumble across something nasty on a caving trip got arguably the best reviews of any Brit pic this year.

— Variety columnist Adam Dawtrey

The Descent had its world premiere at the Edinburgh horror film festival Dead by Dawn on 6 July 2005. It opened to the public in the UK on 10 July 2005, showing on 329 screens and earning £2.6 million. The film received limited releases in other European countries. The London bombings were reported to have affected the box office performance of The Descent.

The picture had its North American premiere at the Sundance Film Festival just after midnight on January 26, 2006. On its debut weekend in the US, The Descent opened with a three-day gross of $8.8 million, and finished with $26,005,908. Total worldwide box office receipts are $57,051,053.

On the review aggregator website Rotten Tomatoes, 87% of 189 critics' reviews are positive, with an average rating of 7.4/10. The website's consensus reads: "Deft direction and strong performances from its all-female cast guide The Descent, a riveting, claustrophobic horror film." Metacritic, which uses a weighted average, assigned the film a score of 71 out of 100, based on 30 critics, indicating "generally favorable" reviews. Audiences polled by CinemaScore gave the film an average grade of "B" on an A+ to F scale.

Peter Bradshaw of The Guardian awarded The Descent three stars out of five, saying, "Neil Marshall carries it off with a punky flair and keeps the yeecch factor cranked up high." However, Bradshaw criticised "silly moments" and plot-holes. Writing on the BBC's website, Andy Jacobs gave it four stars out of five, dubbing it "like Aliens meets Deliverance", praising the cast, especially Mendoza, and calling The Descent "the horror film of the year." Empire also scored the film four stars out of five, with reviewer Dan Jolin praising the economy of the concept and the effective use of sound design and limited lighting. Jolin summed up: "The most significant Brit chiller since 28 Days Later."

Roger Ebert's editor, Jim Emerson, reviewed the film for Ebert's column whilst Ebert was on leave due to surgery, giving it four out of four stars. He wrote, "This is the fresh, exciting summer movie I've been wanting for months. Or for years, it seems."

Manohla Dargis of The New York Times described The Descent as "one of the better horror entertainments of the last few years", calling it "indisputably and pleasurably nerve-jangling". Dargis applauded the claustrophobic atmosphere of the film, though she perceived sexual overtones in the all-female cast with their laboured breathing and sweaty clothing. Rene Rodriguez of The Miami Herald thought that the film devolved into a guessing game of who would survive, though he praised Marshall's "nightmare imagery" for generating scares that work better than other horror films. Rodriguez also noted the attempt to add dimension to the female characters but felt that the actresses were unable to perform.

Lawrence Toppman of The Charlotte Observer thought a weakness of The Descent was the failure of the writer to explain the evolution of the creature, though he said, "Their clicking and howling, used for echolocation and communication, makes them more alien; this otherness gives humans permission to mutilate them without seeming too disgusting to be sympathetic." Michael Wilmington of the Chicago Tribune thought that the crawlers should have been left out of the film, believing, "Watching those gray, slithering beings chasing and biting the women makes it hard to maintain any suspension of disbelief."

Top ten lists, 2006:

- 1st – Bravo's 13 Even Scarier Movie Moments
- 7th — Sight & Sound
- 10th – Nathan Lee, Village Voice
- 10th – Stephen Hunter, The Washington Post

=== Home media ===
The Descent was released on DVD in the United Kingdom on 20 March 2006. It was released in the United States on DVD and Blu-ray on 26 December 2006. The discs contain both the unaltered UK release and the edited US theatrical cut, the former being advertised as an "unrated" version. On 11 November 2025, Lionsgate released a 20th-anniversary edition of The Descent on 4K Ultra HD Blu-ray in the United States. The SteelBook edition featured a new 4K presentation with Dolby Vision, both the theatrical and unrated versions, and new retrospective featurettes. On 29 June 2026, StudioCanal and Pathé released a newly restored 4K Ultra HD Blu-ray edition in the United Kingdom. The three-disc release included the alternative American theatrical ending, audio commentaries, behind-the-scenes documentaries and a retrospective interview with director Neil Marshall.

== Legacy ==
The Descent has been retrospectively regarded as one of the most significant horror films of the 2000s. In 2014, Michael Blyth of the British Film Institute included it among ten great horror films of the 21st century, comparing its use of suspense to Jaws (1975) and Alien (1979), and praising its claustrophobic atmosphere and use of darkness. In a 2025 retrospective marking the film's 20th anniversary, Maria Lattila of Film Stories described it as one of the best British horror films, highlighting its exploration of grief, character development and use of restricted lighting.

The film has also attracted academic analysis. In 2013, Liverpool University Press published James Marriott's monograph The Descent as part of its Devil's Advocates series, examining the film's treatment of female relationships, psychological trauma and the archaic within horror cinema.

The Descent influenced subsequent works in both film and video games. Darrell Gallagher, studio head at Crystal Dynamics, identified the film as an inspiration for the darker tone of the 2013 Tomb Raider reboot. Director Andrew Cumming also cited it as an influence on his prehistoric horror film Out of Darkness (2022), particularly its claustrophobic environments and gradual transition from implied threats to direct confrontation with monsters.

== Sequel ==
A sequel to The Descent was filmed at Ealing Studios in London during 2008 and was released on 2 December 2009 in the UK.
