= Gino Alache =

Peruvian music journalist and producer

- Born: Gino Sandro Alache Salas; March 22, 1973 (age 53); Lima, Peru
- Occupations: Music journalism, publicist, creative director, press agent
- Years active: 1990–present
- Spouse: Patricia Ballenas
- Website: rockumweb.com

Gino Alache (born March 22, 1973) is a Peruvian-Canadian public relations specialist, music journalist, publicist and radio personality. He is best known as a specialist with in-depth knowledge of hard rock and heavy metal music. His interviews have been broadcast in different languages.

== Biography ==
Gino Alache was born in Lima, Peru. He grew up in La Molina district and attended a Catholic school on Marianist education. In his adolescence, he started to feel a deep admiration for bands such as Manowar, Metallica, Judas Priest, Led Zeppelin and Black Sabbath. Since then, he began to write music articles finding what it would be his passion.

== The beginning ==
During his first years of adolescence, he listened a lot the American heavy metal radio programming such as KNAC 105.05, Pure Rock and Pirate Radio, he also followed the MTV television program Headbangers Ball, and then in 1994, the Latin American version of MTV launched, under the name of Headbangers. It was the perfect opportunity for him to send his first articles by mail from Peru. Those articles were always about the Latin American heavy metal and hard rock scene, and, fortunately, they were accepted by the following programs up to 1997. In an interview on January 17, 2006, for the Portuguese webpage SounD(/)ZonE, he said: “I think that all started when I was in elementary school, a classmate brought a long duration of Iron Maiden – The Number Of The Beast, it was 1982, since then, I become passionate about all this.”

== Career ==
By January 2002, using the Internet, he began the creation of a website and later an online radio station called Rockum. His first steps in the web were as editor-in-chief and writer about Anglophone hard rock and heavy metal. By 2002, he began to write about records that just launched in Europe and United States, and then the ones from Latin America and Asia.

In 2004, Rockum made its debut with its first interviews with international artists, with two programs such as World Premiere and Breaking The Rock by streaming.

By 2006, he started to do live international coverage, beginning a new period, he travelled to countries such as Argentina and Chile to broadcast the events of the Latin American scene.

In summer 2008, he began to work in public relations, specialized in training. He was a press agent for the most important international shows in Peru. He worked with artists such as Aerosmith, Metallica, Stryper, Cerati, Skid Row, The Cranberries, José Luis Perales, Rotting Christ and Yellowcard. In February 2010, Terra Networks hired him as an editor-in-chief of a new blog called Zona de Metal.

In March 2010, the Phantom Magazine invited him to be a staff writer, with a monthly column called "Sólido como el Metal"

In April 2010, he did his first international journalistic interview for the most important newspaper of Peru, El Comercio.

In May 2012, he got a postgraduate degree in public relations and corporate communication from San Martin de Porres University.

In June 2012 by the Radio Clasicas Actuales.com, he released his first radio program, apart from Rockum, called Rockum Classics with just 1970s rock music.

By September 2013, as a general producer and creative director, he was in charge of the intellectual creativity and production of the first heavy metal song of the famous Peruvian singer of Creole and Afro Peruvian music Eva Ayllón with the band of hard rock Temptation Xplodes, the song was called "Desaparecer".

In the same year, the Archbishop of Lima hired him as a producer and press director to create the first massive March for Life by producing and directing three testimonial video clips and a song with a video clip where the Peruvian artist Sandra Muente sang "Vengo a cuidar de ti" ("I come to take care of you").

In September 2014, he released his new video clip with the band Kikasban called Seis (This music comes from the soul), and he tried to mix the different fusions that our cultures, ethnics, and traditions have.

== Support to Peruvian rock ==
In April 2010, in a new press interview made by the Peruvian newspaper El Chino, he declared: "The rock in Peru is not only (his commercial stars) Pedro Suárez Vertiz and Libido, be heavy is a matter of survival, we ask the Peruvian State for support to the real rock scene in Peru". The Chino newspaper qualified his work as a "quixotic" example that a man does not need to be used to "hang on to boom" to have success.

== Personal life ==
On September 20, 2014, he married the constitutional lawyer Patricia Ballenas.

== Present ==
Nowadays, he lives with his wife and continues editing and broadcasting Rockum. Gino produces new artists, and he is a business consultant in matters of press and corporate reputation. He is writing an autobiographical book about his experiences in the world of rock, which will launch by the middle of 2020.

In May 2019, Alache had his first TV appearance in Canada. Global Television Network in Canada invited him to their "The Morning Show" aired via Global News CKWS-TV in Kingston. In that Canadian breakfast television show, Gino Alache was considered a celebrated music journalist and publicly named a New Kingstonian by the MuchMusic’s and MuchMoreMusic’s longest running on-air Canadian television personality Bill Welychka.

Alache joined CFRC-FM 101.9FM, a non-commercial campus radio station at Queen's University in Kingston, Ontario, Canada, in June 2019. He hosts the Rockum Radio Show, a two-hour program featuring hard rock and heavy metal music.
