= Harrigan =

Harrigan may refer to:

- Harrigan (surname)
- Harrigan (TV series), Canadian children's television series
- "Harrigan" (song), by George M. Cohan, from Fifty Miles from Boston
- Harrigan and Son, a 1960–1961 ABC situation comedy starring Pat O'Brien and Roger Perry, which used Cohan's song as its theme tune
- Harrigan, N.Y., part of Ellenburg, New York
- Harrigan (film), a British crime drama film
