= Jana Lynne White =

Canadian television and radio personality

Jana Lynne White is a Canadian television and radio personality, most noted as a reporter and video jockey for MuchMusic and MuchMoreMusic in the 1990s and 2000s.

Originally from Kingston, Ontario, she grew up in Kingston and the small outlying village of Sunbury. She briefly moved back to Kingston to attend St. Lawrence College, but soon dropped out and moved to Calgary, Alberta, with a band she was singing with at the time. After the band broke up, she further moved to Victoria, British Columbia, to study radio and television broadcasting at Camosun College, and worked in radio and television in Vancouver in the 1980s.

She joined MuchMusic in 1990 as a cohost of the music magazine series The NewMusic, and was also frequently host of Intimate and Interactive live specials. After she and co-host Kim Clarke Champniss were replaced as hosts of The NewMusic by Avi Lewis in 1996, she remained with MuchMusic in other roles until joining MuchMoreMusic upon its launch in 1998. Within months, John Doyle of The Globe and Mail was writing that White appeared to be the channel's only employee, stating that "the woman does everything — interviews, running down the appalling video chart, promos, everything except come to your house and turn on the TV for you." Although she was essentially positioned as the channel's primary public face in this era, she wasn't actually its sole on-air personality, as the channel also aired Diego Fuentes's Clip Trip; in 2000, Bill Welychka also joined the channel as host of several programs.

CHUM Limited programming head Denise Donlon said of White's M3 interview series SpeakEasy in this era that "Jana's real strengths are in interviewing. She's an incredibly insightful and warm interviewer. ... An artist will come in and they'll basically want to curl up in her lap, [which] is not the easiest thing to do with artists, because, you know, the interviewing thing's bizarre -- you sit across from somebody and you expect them to tell you things they wouldn't tell their own mother."

She was also later host of the documentary series SexTV, until leaving CHUM in 2004.

She returned to the Vancouver media market with a talk radio show on CIWV-FM when it launched in 2015 as Roundhouse Radio.
