= The NewMusic =

- Created by: John Martin
- Presented by: Jeanne Beker; J. D. Roberts; Daniel Richler; Laurie Brown; Denise Donlon; Jana Lynne White; Kim Clarke Champniss; Avi Lewis; Byron Wong; George Stroumboulopoulos; Hannah Sung; Hannah Simone

Original release
- Network: MuchMusic; MuchMoreMusic; Citytv, A-Channel; CP24
- Release: 1979 – 2008

The NewMusic was a weekly Canadian music and culture television newsmagazine.

Created by John Martin, and intended to combine the spirit of magazines like Rolling Stone and New Musical Express with the format of a television newsmagazine, The NewMusic presented current popular music in a broad social, political and economic context.

The NewMusic aired on several Canadian television stations including MuchMusic, MuchMoreMusic, Citytv, A-Channel and CP24.

== Origin story ==
The NewMusic was conceived in 1979 by Martin, who sought to create a program blending music with social and political commentary. Martin was frustrated by the lack of meaningful television coverage of music’s cultural impact, particularly during a time when youth culture was navigating major social shifts. He envisioned a program that treated music as a lens to explore issues like politics, identity, and activism.

Before finding a home for The NewMusic, Martin pitched the concept to CBC and CTV, but both networks passed, deeming it too unconventional for their audiences. Undeterred, Martin approached Moses Znaimer at Citytv, whose boundary-pushing ethos made it a perfect match for the program. Znaimer supported Martin's vision, allowing him the creative freedom to produce what became a pioneering show.

The first episode aired on September 29, 1979, with hosts Jeanne Beker and J. D. Roberts. From the start, The NewMusic broke ground with on-location interviews and stories examining topics like censorship and activism, merging journalistic depth with the vibrancy of pop culture. Its success laid the foundation for MuchMusic, shaping Canadian music journalism for decades.

== Opening Theme ==
The NewMusic's most commonly used instrumental opening was "Papa's Got a Brand New Pigbag" by British post-punk band Pigbag. Very early episodes used Rush's "2112: Overture."

== Hosts ==
- Jeanne Beker (1979–1985)
- J. D. Roberts (1979–1985)
- Daniel Richler (1985–1987)
- Laurie Brown (1985–1990)
- Denise Donlon (1986–1993)
- Jana Lynne White (1990–1996)
- Kim Clarke Champniss (1993–1996)
- Avi Lewis (1996–1998)
- Byron Wong (1998–2000)
- George Stroumboulopoulos (2000–2004)
- Hannah Sung (2004–2006)
- Hannah Simone (2006–2008)

== Notable interviews ==
The NewMusic interviewed many of the biggest names in popular music during its history including Bono, Robert Plant, Joe Strummer, members of Guns N' Roses, Chuck D, Jeff Buckley, Kate Bush, Peter Tosh, Tupac Shakur, Joni Mitchell, David Bowie, Thom Yorke, members of The Ramones, Courtney Love, members of Blur and many others.

A few standout interviews delivered unforgettable exchanges between interviewer and guest.

- Sting - Jeanne Beker interviewed The Police frontman from the side of a bathtub as he bathed.
- Iggy Pop - Jeanne Beker wrapped an interview with Pop early when the musician teased and taunted her, saying things like "I have more talent than you could ever dream of."
- Johnny Rotten - The Sex Pistols frontman pelted Kim Clarke Champniss with grapes and walked out of his interview after taking issue with the line of questioning. He also told Champniss to "shut up."
- Maurice Gibb - The Bee Gees' vocalist stormed out of a full band interview with Kim Clarke Champniss, visibly upset by questions that challenged the band's legacy.
- Marianne Faithfull - Faithfull abruptly cut the interview short, asking Kim Clarke Champniss to wrap it up when she lost interest midway through. The reason for her sudden change of heart remains a mystery.

== Awards ==
- 1992 - Best Light Information Series - Gemini Awards
- 2001 - Best Talk/General Information Series - Gemini Awards
- 2010 - Masterworks Honouree - Gemini Awards

== Cancellation and legacy ==
In November 2008, The NewMusic was officially canceled after nearly 30 years on air, marking the end of a groundbreaking era in Canadian music journalism. The news came as part of wider layoff announcement from CTVglobemedia, owner of MuchMusic. The cancellation reflected broader industry shifts, as MuchMusic pivoted toward youth-oriented reality content amid declining budgets and changing viewer habits.

The NewMusic aired its final episode on November 17, 2008.

Several former hosts have commented on the program post-cancellation:

- ""We really did look at it as the '60 Minutes' of music journalism. It was the opportunity to do our specials on media literacy, or gender, or issues of racism. Bigger more substantive storytelling that was based in music. And when you look at the legacy of 'The NewMusic' it really was one of those shows from which so much great television and outstanding journalists and personalities came, people really cut their teeth on that show and went on to do wonderful new things after that." - Denise Donlon (speaking to Canoe.com)
- "It was this golden era of television that I don't think could ever be created again." - George Stroumboulopoulos (speaking to The Canadian Press)
- "The NewMusic was very influential. It helped [us] take pop culture and rock music really seriously as something to be discussed and to think deeply about, for sure. And that permeates all of our culture today in media." - Hannah Sung (speaking to Exclaim! Magazine)
- "It was groundbreaking; two kids from Toronto running around interviewing rock stars on smoky buses, hanging around backstage... We weren’t music journalists. Later I wasn’t a fashion journalist. It was entertainment reporting, first and foremost." - Jeanne Beker (speaking to the Toronto Star)

At the 25th Gemini Awards, the public was invited to vote for their favorite Canadian TV programs from the ceremony's 25-year history. The NewMusic ranked 24th on that list.
