= Peter Gzowski Award =

Canadian literacy award

- Awarded for: Contributions to adult literacy in Canada
- Country: Canada
- Presented by: Peter Gzowski Invitational
- First award: 1993; 33 years ago

The Peter Gzowski Award (originally styled the Peter Gzowski Literacy Award of Merit) is an award given annually by Peter Gzowski Invitational in memory of Peter Gzowski to recognize contributions to adult literacy in Canada.

== Winners ==
| Year | Winner | Notes |
|---|---|---|
| 2021 | John Chew | In recognition of years of volunteer service to Frontier College's Scrabble fundraisers. |
| 2020 | Dianne Smith | Presented for her work with the P.E.I. Literacy Alliance. |
| 2019 | Jacey Firth Hagen | In recognition of her Indigenous language advocacy. |
| 2019 | Nicole Alty | For volunteer service to the John Howard Society of Manitoba. |
| 2018 | Christine Melnick | In recognition of her creating and running the Share the Magic charity while serving as a Manitoba MLA. |
| 2017 | Beth Gillis | For work as co-chair of NS PGI. |
| 2016 | Joan Kenny | As organizer of the first New Brunswick PGI. |
| 2015 | Peter Mansbridge | For three decades of commitment to adult literacy. |
| 2014 | Mike Stevens | For 15 years of participation in PGI events in Northern Canada. |
| 2013 | Gillian Lortie | |
| 2012 | John Boraas | |
| 2011 | Jane Patrick | |
| 2010 | The Arrogant Worms | First two-time recipients. |
| 2008 | Rick Peddle | |
| 2005 | Sean Fine | |
| 2004 | The Arrogant Worms | |
| 1998 | Jacqueline Thayer Scott | |
| 1996 | Peter Calamai | |
| 1994 | Allan Cooper | |
| 1993 | Denise Donlon | First recipient. |
| ? | John Fitzpatrick | Date of award uncertain. |
| ? | Joe Hlavay | Date of award uncertain. |
