= Harrigan (surname) =

Harrigan is a surname of Irish origin, an Anglicized form of the Gailge patronym Ò hArragaìn, which is itself a variant of Ò hAnradhaìn. Notable people with the surname include:

- Abi Harrigan (born 2002), Australian freestyle skier
- Anthony Hart Harrigan (1925–2010), American journalist and conservative
- Bill Harrigan (born 1960), Australian rugby league football referee
- Claire Harrigan (born 1964), Scottish artist
- Dan Harrigan (born 1955), American swimmer
- David Xavier Harrigan (1948–2000), singer, actor, and painter known as Tomata du Plenty
- Duncan Harrigan (1921–2005), Scottish footballer
- Edward Harrigan (1845–1911), American playwright, lyricist, actor and theater owner
- Frank Harrigan (1904–1969), American basketballer
- Henry J. Harrigan (1873–1940), American firefighter
- John Harrigan (fl. 1990s), actor, writer and filmmaker
- Lanville Harrigan (born 1967), Anguillan cricketer
- Lori Harrigan (born 1970), American softball player
- Matt Harrigan (born 1969), American actor, producer, and writer
- Mikiah Herbert Harrigan (born 1998), British professional basketball
- Nedda Harrigan (1899–1989), American actress, daughter of Edward Harrigan
- Pat Harrigan (born 1987), American politician in North Carolina
- Stephen Harrigan (born 1948), American journalist
- Steve Harrigan, American journalist
- Tahesia Harrigan (born 1982), British Virgin Islands sprinter
- Thomas M. Harrigan, American counter-narcotics official
- Veronica Harrigan, Canadian rugby union player
- William Harrigan (1893–1966), American actor, son of Edward Harrigan

== Fictional characters ==
- Barry Harrigan, from Harrigan (film)
- "Big John" Harrigan, from L.I.E.
- Hop Harrigan, comic book character
- James Harrigan Sr and James Harrigan Jr, from Harrigan and Son
- Mike Harrigan, from Predator 2
- Conrad Harrigan, from the TV series Mobland
