= Bill Fellows =

British actor (born 1957)

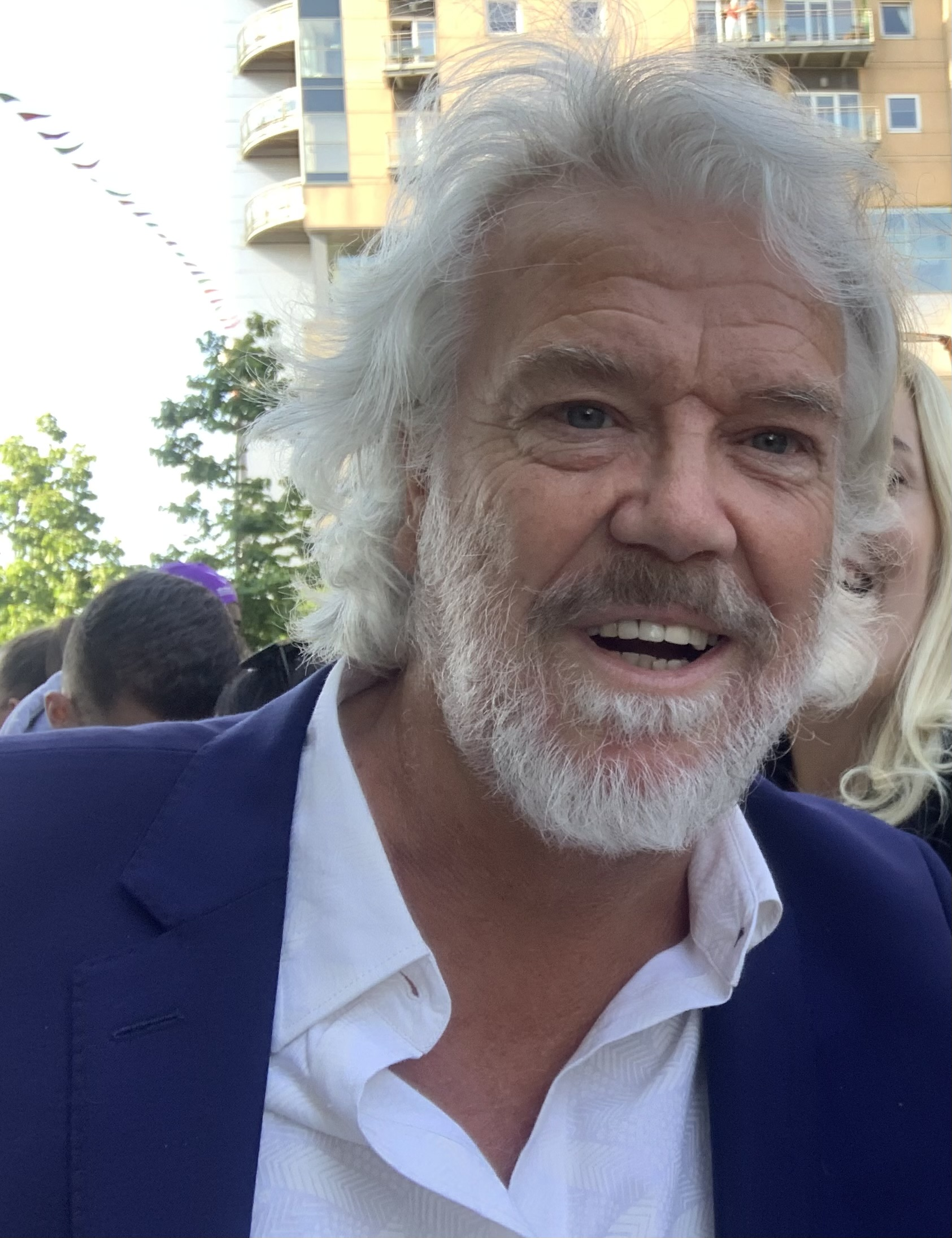
- Fellows in 2023
- Born: May 1957 (age 69); Middlesbrough, North Yorkshire, England
- Occupation: Actor
- Years active: 1980s–present

Bill Fellows (born 25 May 1957) is an English actor, known for his roles as Stu Carpenter in Coronation Street and George Cartrick in Ted Lasso.

== Life and career ==
Fellows was born in Middlesbrough.

His theatre work includes Mickey in the West End's Blood Brothers and The Trackers of Oxyrhynchus at the Royal National Theatre. Fellows' son, Dylan Reeves Fellows, has appeared alongside him in the film Splinter.

== Filmography ==
Year	Title	Role	Notes
1982	Scene	Eric	Episode: "Ties"
1982	How Sleep the Brave	Jamieson	
1985	The Tripods	Moritz	Episode: "Travel"
1985	Silas Marner	Aaron Winthrop	TV movie
1986	The Monocled Mutineer	Geordie	3 episodes
1987–1989	Flying Lady	Andy Gregson	Main; 13 episodes
1988	White Peak Farm	Martin Tanner	3 episodes
1988	Stormy Monday	Workman	
1988	Playing for Real	Roderick Ferris	Episode 3
1990	The Paradise Club	Sammy Chase	Episode: Rock and Roll Roulette
1992	Kevin and Co	Christ	TV series
1993	Spender	Eddie Lipscomb	Episode: "Puck"
1993	Fighting for Gemma	Andy Pearson	TV movie
1993	Harry	DS Vernon	Series 1, Episode 9
1993–2025	Casualty	Don/Jerry/Philip Trent/Malc Walsh/Vince Cartwright/Colin Starky/Nick Gwyn/Terry	8 episodes
1994	London's Burning	Trevor	5 episodes
1995	Dangerfield	Gerry Collins	Episode: "Dr. Stevens' Stalker"
1995–1996	Julia Jekyll and Harriet Hyde	Jerry Jekyll	2 episodes
1996	Heartbeat	Taxi Driver	Episode: "Snapped"
1997	Hetty Wainthropp Investigates	Stan Griffin	Episode: "All Stitched Up"
1997–1998	Dream Team	Des Baker	Main; 67 episodes
1999	Badger	Snow	Episode: "Rhino and Chips"
2000	Nature Boy	Ken Davis	4 episodes
2000	In Defence	DCI Bobby Calvert	2 episodes
2000	A Dinner of Herbs	Peter Greenbank	2 episodes
2000–2001	Byker Grove	Mr. Rivers	Recurring
2001	A Touch of Frost	James Ingram	2 episodes
2002	Until Death	P.C. Davis	
2002	In Deep	Holland	2 episodes
2002	Is Harry on the Boat?	Ray	Series 1, Episode 7
2002	Rose and Maloney	Alan Kerraway	Pilot
2002–2009	Holby City	Frank Bridger/Rob Landis	Episodes: "Pills and Frills", "Future Perfect"
2003	Serious & Organised	Wilson	Episode: "Human Trade"
2003	Clocking Off	Tim Woodbridge	Episode: "Colin's Story"
2003	Burn It	Solicitor	Series 2, Episode 5
2003	Gifted	Ian Norris	TV movie
2003–2020	Doctors	Peter Hedges/Bill Farrell/Brian Clarkson/Carl Bater/Inspector Pete Owens/Jerry Bayfield/Nobby Gosden/Ted Dawes	9 episodes
2004	The Bill	Morris Tucker	Episode: "Running with Scissors:
2004	No Angels	William Van Ments	Series 1, Episode 7
2004	55 Degrees North	George	Series 1, Episode 4
2004	Waking the Dead	Neil Wilcox	2 episodes
2005	Supervolcano	Reporter	Uncredited
2006	Sub Zero	Bridges	
2006	Blackbeard	Dr. Peter Bruce	3 episodes
2006	Pocket Thief	Policeman	Short film
2006	EastEnders	Chaplain	1 episode
2007	Perfect to Begin	Dad	short film
2008	Romans 12:20	Cid 2	Short film
2008	Witch House: The Legend of Petronel Haxley	John Stearne	
2008	Dear Mum	Paul Green	Short film
2009	Inspector George Gently	Ronnie Chadwick	Episode: "Gently in the Night"
2009	The Tournament	Pub Landlord	
2009	Zombie Women of Satan	Dr. Henry Englebert Zander III	
2009	Once Upon a Time in Dublin	Neville Jessop	
2009	Act of God	Ronnie Chadwick	Episode: "Gently in the Night"
2009	Bait Room	Adamson	Short film
2009	Innocence	Tom	Short film
2010	Sports Day 3D	Headmaster	Short film
2010	Soulboy	Billy McCain	
2010	In Our Name	Dr. John Tennant	TV film
2010	Downton Abbey	Joe Burns	Series 1, Episode 4
2010	Other Side of the Game	Gary Dempsey	
2010	Laminat	Jack	Short film
2010	Dawn & the Living Dad	Dad	Short film
2010	Dark Room	Patrick Donaghy	Short film
2011	United	Robert Charlton	TV film
2011	Bride & Gloom	Aiden's dad	Short film
2011	Land Girls	Ellis Harper	3 episodes
2011	Freya	Detective	Short film
2011	Darlo Til I Die	Norman Hodgson	Short film
2011	Welcome to Leathermill	The Hunter	Short film
2011	Sunday Best	Albert	Short film
2012	Hunderby	Geoff	Series 1, Episode 4
2012	Waterloo Road	Trevor Croft	Episode: "A Woman Scorned"
2012	Hebburn	Geoff	Episode: "Feeling Dynamic"
2012	Shakespeare's Wart	Director 2	Short film
2012–2013	Wolfblood	Bernie	8 episodes
2013	Broadchurch	Laurie	3 episodes
2013	King of the Sands	St John Philby	
2013	Harrigan	DS Colin Moss	
2014	Bloodless	John T. Richardson	
2014	The Midnight Beast	Homeless Man	Episode: "Beast Holliday Ever"
2014	Almost Married	Lydia's Dad	
2014	New Worlds	Busby	2 episodes
2014	The Stagg Do	The Judge	
2014	As He Lay Falling	William	Short film
2014	Harriet's Army	Dad	8 episodes
2015	Blood and Carpet	Rhodes	
2015	Vera	Alec	Episode: "Shadows in the Sky"
2015	The Witcher 3: Wild Hunt	Scholar/Fisherman/Guard	Video game, voice
2015	I Do Harm	Jim	Short film
2015	Objects to See Further	Robert Sterling Newall	Short film
2015	All in a Day's Work	The Seller	Short film
2015	The Lost Girl	DCI Grimm	Short film
2016	Ripper	Frederick Abberline	Short film
2016	Moving On	Charlie	Episode: "Scratch"
2016	The Mixture	Old Oscar	Short film
2016	The Five	Graham	Episode 9
2016	Broken	Evie's Father	
2016	Lady Macbeth	Dr. Burdon	
2016	Dark Angel	Mr. Brownlee	Episode 1
2016	Almost Married	Lydia's Dad	
2016	The National Union of Space People	Bomb Specialist Jones	
2017	Father Brown	Teddy O'Connell	Episode: "The Chedworth Cyclone"
2017	Shadow	Dad	Short film
2017	In Extremis	Homeless Man	
2017	Torment	Jack	2 episodes
2018	Hit the North	Dad	
2018	The Last Witness	Bill the Farmer	
2018	Lambeth Nights		Short film
2018	Final Score	Superintendent Thompson	
2018	Stealing the Binds	Hector	Short film
2019	One Track Mind	Jack	Short film
2019	Ransom	Hank Atkins	Episode: "Life and Limb"
2019	The Wrong Car	Terry	Short film
2019	Girlfight	Jonno	Short film
2019	Parasomniac	Gus	Short film
2019	Moreland's Firm	Jimmy Pearson	
2019	Gold Digger	Landlord	Episode: "Her Baby"
2019–2021	This Time with Alan Partridge	Ted	3 episodes
2020	Charlotte Link - Im Tal des Fuchses	Aaron Graig	TV film
2020	Geminus	William	Short film
2020	The Reckoning	Sutter	
2020–2023	Ted Lasso	George Cartrick	10 episodes
2021	Palamós	Jack	Short film
2021	Winifred Meeks	Dad	
2021	Whitstable Pearl	Keith	Episode: "The Man on the Blue Plaque"
2021	A Bird Flew In	Drew	
2021	Splinter	John	Lead role
2021	Between Worlds	Last Man	Short film
2021–2024	Coronation Street	Stu Carpenter	Regular role
2022	Give Them Wings	Norman Hodgson	
2023	Lore	Jeff	
2023	Sky Peals	Terry	
2023	Seeing	Brian Woodland	Short film
2024	Smoggie Queens	Keith	2 episodes
2027	Always Double-Knot	Nigel Smith	Short film
