= Captain Tractor =

Canadian folk rock band

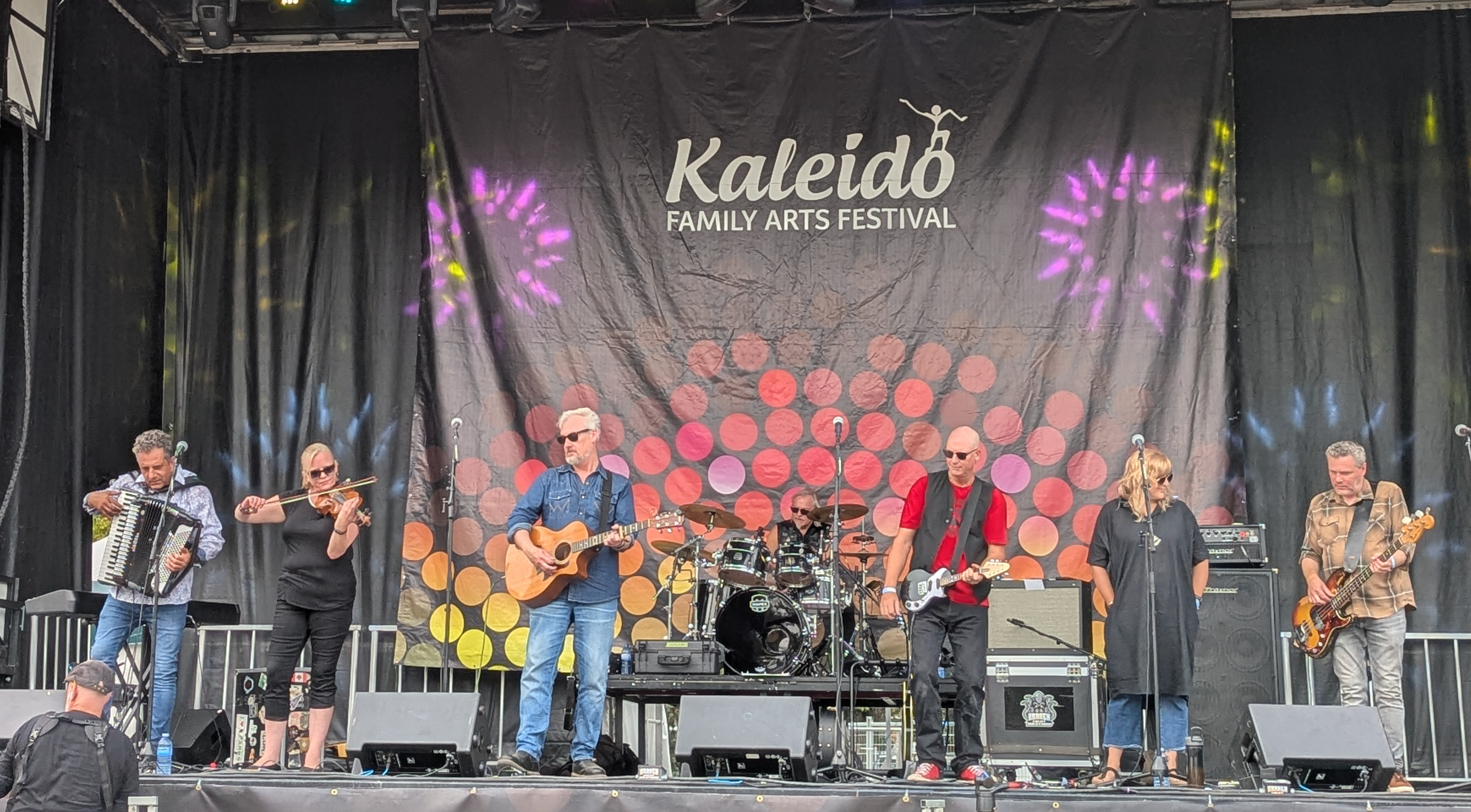
- Captain Tractor in 2025; from left to right: Jason Kodie, Shannon Johnson, Chris Wynters, Jules Mounteer, Scott Peters, Aimee Hill and Jon Nordstrom

Background information
- Origin: Edmonton, Alberta, Canada
- Genres: Folk rock
- Years active: 1993–present
- Members: Chris Wynters; Scott Peters; Jules Mounteer; Jon Nordstrom; Jason Kodie; Shannon Johnson
- Past members: Aimee Hill; Jeff Smook; Brock Skywalker
- Website: www.captaintractor.com

Captain Tractor is a Canadian folk rock band, based in Edmonton, Alberta. They play a punk-influenced variant of Celtic folk music, which has been compared to Great Big Sea, The Pogues or Spirit of the West. Their songs are often rich in local, cultural, and geographical references.

== History ==
The band's most famous songs have been renditions of the folk music classics "The Log Driver's Waltz" and "Drunken Sailor", as well as a cover of the Arrogant Worms' "The Last Saskatchewan Pirate". They have also developed a following for their brand of Canadian rock, with singles such as "Up the Hill", "Frozen Puck to the Head", "This Is Not a Sad Song", "Another Drinking Song", and "The Bastard of Strathcona County".

In celebration of the release of the band's sixth album, North of the Yellowhead (2005 Six Shooter Records), Edmonton's Alley Kat Brewing Company released Captain Tractor's Yellowhead Wheat Ale.

Their seventh studio album, Famous Last Words, was released on May 3, 2011. A live record, Live at the Roxy, was released in 2015.

To celebrate their 25th anniversary in 2018, the band released 25 Years On, a re-mastered retrospective with four new tracks recorded in February 2018 with Nik Kozub at The Audio Department in Edmonton, two unreleased tracks from the vaults, and seventeen previous tracks. In addition, they partnered with Hansen Distillery to create the Twenty-Fifth Anniversary Limited Edition Captain Tractor Spiced Rye Whiskey.

== Band members ==
The band consists of five men, one woman, and their mascot, a deer named Bucky. The band members are:

- Chris Wynters - vocals, guitar, songwriter
- Scott Peters - vocals, mandolin, guitar, bodhran, songwriter, driver
- Jules Mounteer - drums, percussion, driver
- Jon Nordstrom - bass, trumpet, guitar, vocals, songwriter. Joined before Hat Trick.
- Jason Kodie - keyboards, vocals, musical restraint. Joined before North of the Yellowhead.
- Shannon Johnson - fiddle, vocals

Former members include:

- Aimee Hill - flute, vocals. Left after East of Edson.
- Jeff Smook - bass, vocals, songwriter. Left after Bought the Farm.
- Brock Skywalker - accordion, flute, guitar, bodhran, penny whistle, harmonica, mandolin, keyboards, vocals, songwriter. Left just before North of the Yellowhead.

== Discography ==
Captain Tractor has released seven albums:

- Land (1994)
- East of Edson (1995)
- Bought the Farm (1997)
- Hat Trick (1998)
- Celebrity Traffic Jam (1999)
- Hoserista (2000)
- North of the Yellowhead (2005)
- Famous Last Words (2011)
- Live at the Roxy (2015)
- 25 Years On (2018)

They have also released a video entitled Inconsequential Things in 1998, and an interactive CD-ROM, Bus Madness, in 1995.

Members' solo albums:

- Chris Wynters's Skywriting (Six Shooter Records, 2005) and 2010-1982 (Shameless Records, 2010).
- Jon Nordstrom's Brick and Stone (Independent, 2003) and Waiting for Summer (Independent 2005).
- Former member Brock Skywalker's Cerebral Reruns (FrozenPuck, 2004).
