= Christmas Turkey =

Studio album by The Arrogant Worms
- Released: 1997
- Genre: Comedy
- Label: Arrogant Worms Records

The Arrogant Worms chronology
Live Bait (1997)	Christmas Turkey (1997)	Dirt! (1999)

Christmas Turkey is a Christmas-themed album released in 1997 by the Canadian comedy music group The Arrogant Worms. It includes a re-recorded version of "The Christmas Song", which first appeared on their debut album, The Arrogant Worms.

== Track listing ==
No.	Title	Length
1.	"Santa's Gonna Kick Your Ass"	1:22
2.	"The Christmas Song"	1:40
3.	"Santa Got Arrested"	2:18
4.	"Christmas Sucks"	3:54
5.	"Things Are Looking Bad for Santa"	2:24
6.	"Christmas Turkey Blues"	3:47
7.	"Oh God, I'm Santa Claus"	2:49
8.	"Christmas is Almost Here"	2:15
9.	"Dad Threw Up on Christmas Day"	2:02
10.	"The Same Christmas Cake"	2:59
11.	"Christmastime"	3:12
12.	"Christmas Blues"	1:49
13.	"Christmas Hangover"	2:46
14.	"Vincent the Christmas Virus"	1:47
15.	"Christmas in Ignace"	2:14
Total length:		36:24
