= Darren Morfitt =

British actor

- Born: 12 September 1973 (age 53); Hartlepool, England
- Occupation: Actor

Darren Morfitt (born 12 September 1973) is an English actor who has appeared in Dream Team (1997-1998), Grafters (1998-1999), Warriors (1999), Dalziel and Pascoe (2001), Dog Soldiers (2002), 55 Degrees North (2004), Making Waves (2004), The Government Inspector (2005), Doomsday (2008), and Doctor Who (2010).

== Early life ==
Morfitt was born 12 September 1973 in Hartlepool, England. After finishing his A-levels at Hartlepool Sixth Form College, Morfitt studied acting at Mountview Academy of Theatre Arts, London, graduating in 1997.

== Career ==
In 1997, Morfitt landed his first major television role as Dean Hocknell for 71 episodes of the football drama series Dream Team (1997-1998). He appeared as Simon Purvis in 15 episodes of Grafters (1998-1999). From 2004, he starred as D.S. Patrick Yates in 14 episodes of the Newcastle upon Tyne based detective series 55 Degrees North (2004).

In 2002, he starred in the werewolf horror film Dog Soldiers (2002), in a cast which included Sean Pertwee and Liam Cunningham.

In 2005, he appeared in the television movie The Government Inspector (2005), alongside Mark Rylance. In 2006, he portrayed Jesus in the Manchester Passion, a live dramatization of the Easter story using songs associated with Manchester. A year later, in 2008, he appeared in the science fiction action film Doomsday as Dr. Ben Stirling. He has also appeared in two 2010 episodes of science fiction programme Doctor Who, "The Time of Angels" and "Flesh and Stone" as Billy.

In 2017, Morfitt appeared as a Transport Deck Officer in Star Wars: The Last Jedi.

== Personal life ==
It was while at Mountview that Morfitt met his wife, the actress Helen Latham. They met in 1995 and were married in 2004.

== Filmography ==
Film
Year	Title	Role	Notes
2002	Dog Soldiers	'Spoon' Witherspoon	
2008	Doomsday	Dr. Ben Stirling	
2012	Now Is Good	Mark	
2013	How I Live Now	Sergeant	
2013	Harrigan	Swift	
2016	K-Shop	Steve	
2016	Una	Barman	
2017	Star Wars: The Last Jedi	Transport Deck Officer	

Television
Year	Title	Role	Notes
1997 - 1998	Dream Team	Dean Hocknell	Episodes
1998 - 1999	Grafters	Simon Purvis	15 Episodes
2001	Dalziel and Pascoe	Matthew Collingwood	Episode: "Home Truths"
2004	55 Degrees North	DS Patrick Yates	All 14 episodes
2010	Doctor Who	Billy	Episode: "The Time of Angels"/"Flesh and Stone"
2011	Silent Witness	Sgt Jason McDermott	Episode: "First Casualty"
2011	Inspector George Gently	Paul Collison	Episode: "Goodbye China "
2012	Line of Duty	Brackley	3 episodes
2013	Atlantis	Nilas	Episode: "The Furies"
2013	Casualty	Marcus Leyton	Episode: "A History of Violence"
2014	Scott & Bailey	Barry Keane	Episode: "Damaged"
2015	DCI Banks	Jason McCready	Episode: "What Will Survive"
2017	Silent Witness	DCI Andy Steemson	Episode: "Discovery"
2017	Holby City	Jerry Farnell	Episode: "Keeping the Faith"
2018	The Split	Max Lacey	Episode: "Episode 5"
2023 - 2024	Coronation Street	Dom Everett	recurring
