= Seymour Mace =

British comedian and actor

- Born: Seymour Leon Mace; 1969
- Occupations: Comedian and actor

Seymour Mace (born 1969) is a British comedian and actor.

== Life and career ==
Mace was born in 1969, and he moved with his family soon afterwards to South Africa as his father worked as a gold miner. The family returned to the UK, to Bedworth, near Coventry. Mace later returned to his native Tyneside.

In 1992 Mace had a non speaking part as a removal man in series 4, episode 11 of Byker Grove, he also worked as a clown in the mid-1990s before becoming a stand-up comedian. He was a finalist at the So You Think You're Funny competition at the Edinburgh Festival Fringe in 2001. He has performed several shows at the Fringe, including Marmaduke Spatula's Fuckin' Spectacular Cabaret of Sunshine Show in 2013.

Mace played Steve (and his twin Craig) in the BBC sitcom Ideal between 2005-2010. In 2009, he starred in the horror comedy Zombie Women of Satan. He appeared in the second series of Hebburn as music producer Eric.

Mace was the continuity announcer for CITV between 2009 and 2013.

In 2010, he appeared on Dave's One Night Stand.

Mace also appears in the offbeat comedy film What Happened After Macbeth, which will be released in 2014.

Mace hosted the monthly Giggle Beats Comedy Pub Quiz in Newcastle upon Tyne.

He took part in the 'Laughing for a Change' project in 2014, which aimed to raise awareness of mental health through a comedy tour, also featuring Mrs Barbara Nice and Rob Deering. The project was supported by Time to Change.

In 2015 Mace was nominated for an Edinburgh Comedy Award, for his show Seymour Mace is Niche as F**k!
