= Dirt (The Arrogant Worms album) =

Dirt!

Studio album by The Arrogant Worms
- Released: 1999
- Genre: Comedy
- Label: Arrogant Worms Records

The Arrogant Worms chronology
| Christmas Turkey (1997) | Dirt! (1999) | Idiot Road (2001) |

Professional ratings
Review scores
| Source | Rating |
|---|---|
| Allmusic | 4/5 stars |

Dirt! is the sixth album by the Canadian comedy music group The Arrogant Worms, released in 1999.

== Track listing ==
All tracks by The Arrogant Worms

1. "A Man Has Needs" – 3:46
2. "Steel Drivin' Man" – 4:03
3. "Great to Be a Nerd" – 1:57
4. "Celine Dion" – 3:14
5. "Rocks and Trees" – 1:58
6. "Gaelic Song" – 2:56
7. "Wong's Chinese Buffet" – 2:15
8. "I Am Cow" – 2:02
9. "Johnny Came Home Headless" – 2:57
10. "Heimlich Maneuver" – 3:19
11. "Scary Ned" – 3:19
12. "Sponges" – 2:18
13. "Log in to You" – 3:59
14. "Winnebago" (CD bonus track; not included on cassette release) – 6:23

== Personnel ==
- Andrew "The Steamroller" Affleck – bass, accordion
- The Arrogant Worms – arranger
- Craig Bignell – banjo, percussion, drums
- Al Cross – drums
- Stephen Fearing – acoustic guitar
- Richard Flohil – screenplay
- Jeff May – artwork, video editor
- Jon Park Wheeler – guitar, mandolin
- Don Reed – fiddle
- Andy Thompson – keyboards, producer, mastering, mixing
- Terry Tufts – electric guitar
