= Lore (2023 film) =

- Directed by: James Bushe; Patrick Ryder; Greig Johnson
- Starring: Richard Brake; Bill Fellows; Andrew-Lee Potts
- Release date: August 2023 (FrightFest)
- Running time: 87 minutes
- Country: United Kingdom
- Language: English

Lore is a 2023 British supernatural horror film directed by James Bushe, Patrick Ryder, Greig Johnson and starring Richard Brake, Bill Fellows and Andrew-Lee Potts.

== Cast ==
- Bill Fellows as Jeff
- Richard Brake as Darwin
- Andrew-Lee Potts as Daniel

== Release ==
The film premiered at FrightFest in August 2023.

== Reception ==
Joel Harley of Starburst awarded the film three stars out of five.

Phil Hoad of The Guardian awarded the film two stars out of five.
