= Three Worms and an Orchestra =

Canadian comedy music DVD

Three Worms and an Orchestra DVD cover.

Three Worms and an Orchestra is a DVD of a performance of the Canadian comedy music group The Arrogant Worms with the Edmonton Symphony Orchestra. It includes their most popular songs performed live, as well as two music videos. Prior to the show, the group met with the symphony for a single practice session together. Filming of the concert by Aidan Cosgrave, the group's friend, happened in January 2002 at Winspear Centre.

The original, and heavily edited, version of this performance aired on Bravo! Canada. The Arrogant Worms also released a related CD, Semi-Conducted, with most of the tracks on it.

Rob Salem of the Toronto Star penned a positive review of the recording, praising the song choices for accurately reflecting the group's overall repertoire. He said that despite their casual, upbeat tone, The Arrogant Worms hold their own alongside the full power of an orchestra.
