= Zombie Women of Satan =

- DVD cover
- Directed by: Warren Speed; Steve O'Brien
- Written by: Warren Speed; Seymour Mace; Steve O'Brien
- Produced by: Steve O'Brien
- Starring: Victoria Hopkins; Christian Steel; Warren Speed; Seymour Mace; Bill Fellows; Pete Bonner; Kate Soulsby; Victoria Broom; Joe Nicholson; Gillian Settle; Kathy Paul
- Cinematography: Steve O'Brien
- Edited by: Richard Johnstone
- Music by: Dan Bewick
- Production companies: Growling Clown Entertainment; 24:25 Films
- Distributed by: Revolver Entertainment
- Release dates: 31 August 2009 (FrightFest); 21 June 2010 (United Kingdom)
- Running time: 85 minutes
- Country: United Kingdom
- Language: English
- Budget: £70,000

Zombie Women of Satan is a 2009 British comedy horror film directed by Steve O'Brien and Warren Speed. It was written by Warren Speed with contributions from Seymour Mace and O'Brien. Speed, Victoria Hopkins, and Christian Steel star as a group of circus freaks who must combat zombies and cultists while trying to rescue a captive.

== Plot ==
Johnny Hellfire, Pervo the Clown, Zeus, and Damage the strongman are a circus freak troupe on a promotional tour along with a goth group fronted by Skye Brannigan, whose sister Rachel has gone missing. Along the way, they appear on a show hosted by Tycho Zander, who also leads a sex cult consisting of kidnapped scantily clad girls who are kept hypnotized and drugged. As a result the girls are also very willing subjects in experiments conducted by Tycho's father Henry, an evil scientist who loves keeping the lingerie clad girls strapped down to an operating table in his lab. He accidentally transforms the women in Tycho's cult into zombies, and they attack. The circus freaks must stop the zombies, confront Tycho and the lunatic scientist Henry and rescue Rachel before she becomes the next victim on Henry's operating table.

== Cast ==
- Warren Speed as Pervo the Clown
- Seymour Mace as Johnny Hellfire
- Victoria Hopkins as Skye Brannigan
- Victoria Broom as Rachel Brannigan
- Peter Bonner as Zeus
- Joe Nicholson as Damage
- Bill Fellows as Dr. Henry Englebert Zander III
- Christian Steel as Tycho Zander
- Kathy Paul as Florence 'Mother' Zander
- Marysia Kay as Red Zander
- Gillian Settle as Blue Zander
- Kate Soulsby as Harmony Starr

== Production ==
Zombie Women of Satan was shot in Newcastle and Gateshead in 2009 for £70,000.

== Release ==
The premiere was at the 2009 London FrightFest Film Festival. Supermarkets in the United Kingdom refused to stock the DVD due to its lurid title. Revolver Entertainment released it on DVD in the UK on 21 June 2010. Screen Media Films released it on DVD in the United States on 29 March 2011.

== Reception ==
Ian Berriman of SFX rated it 1/5 stars and compared it negatively to amateur porn. Berriman concluded that it is "dull and ugly", suited only as propaganda against decadent Western culture. Jeremy Blitz of DVD Talk rated it 2/5 stars and wrote, "Zombie Women of Satan provides sporadic fun, lots of blood and gore, and even more bare female flesh. But that's about it. The jokes fall flat as often as they work, the story is pretty incomprehensible and there are few really likeable characters." Marc Patterson of Brutal As Hell called it "a lowbrow, craptastic good time, exploding with cheap gore gags and bountiful nudity." Peter Dendle wrote, "The movie is adolescent in tone and content, and the zombies are played mostly for visual objectification and batting practice."

== Sequel ==
Warren Speed and Chris Greenwood shot a sequel, Zombie Women of Satan 2, in 2013. It stars Speed, Pete Bennett and Michael Fielding amongst others, and was finally released worldwide in 2018. In America it was renamed "Female Zombie Riot".
