= John Martin (Canadian broadcaster) =

Founder of MuchMusic (1947–2006)

John Martin (1947 – February 23, 2006) was a Canadian broadcaster, credited with "almost single-handedly" creating music television in Canada.

== Early life and career ==
Born in Manchester, England, Martin left school at 16 and moved to London, where he worked as a rock drummer and freelance writer. At 20, he moved to Canada, finding work as a researcher for CBC Radio, then CBC Television. On the radio side, he was the first Canadian to break the story of the use of Agent Orange in the Vietnam War; on the television, he produced segments for series like Weekend and Peter Gzowski's 90 Minutes Live. (Filling in once on the current affairs series Viewpoint, he hired the Cambridge University Choir to sing the Canada Elections Act in harmony.)

== The New Music and MuchMusic ==
After the cancellation of 90 Minutes Live, Martin found himself driving a taxicab and pitching a new concept to Canadian TV broadcasters: "rock and talk," bringing a sensibility like those of Rolling Stone and the New Musical Express to bear presenting and interpreting musical culture in a documentary television newsmagazine.

The idea didn't sell to Canadian television networks of the day – at the CBC, it was caught between the departments of variety and current affairs – but Moses Znaimer, the impresario of Toronto independent station CITY-TV, took on Martin's plan, and The NewMusic launched in 1979. It was a great success, becoming Canada's most popular syndicated television series.

Martin then began to plan an entire station devoted to music, and the result, MuchMusic launched in 1984 under Znaimer, Martin and CITY's corporate parent CHUM Limited. "We were a bunch of loonies," Martin later recalled. "My gig was to sort of mould the anarchy. It was a bunch of absolutely crazy people reinventing their lives every day. It was fun." Much went on to great success in its own right, inspired spin-off, joint venture and licensed sister networks and programs, within Canada and internationally, and underwrote the music video arts foundation VideoFACT.

== After Much ==
After leaving Much and CHUM in 1993 – "His mercurial temperament and guerilla management style," CITY's news website would recall after his death, had started "to clash with others in the industry" – he worked on specials, directing The Genius of Lenny Breau (1999), which explores the short and tragic life of Canadian guitar legend Lenny Breau, and also directing Hank & Jimmie: A Story of Country (2000), a portrait of the troubled lives and relationship of Hank Snow and his only child, singer-turned-preacher Jimmie Rodgers Snow. Martin was also program director for the Canadian dance music specialty channel bpm:tv.

He died in 2006, of esophageal cancer.
