= Toast! =

Live album by The Arrogant Worms
- Released: March 2004
- Recorded: June 2003
- Genre: Comedy
- Label: Arrogant Worms Records

The Arrogant Worms chronology
Semi-Conducted (2003)	Toast! (2004)	Beige (2006)

Toast! is a live album by the Canadian comedy music group The Arrogant Worms, which was recorded live in Hugh's Room, Toronto, Ontario, in June 2003 and released the following year. It is different from their previous two live albums in two respects: first, it is made up of all-new material, and second, the live banter in between songs is separated into different tracks. The drumming in the background was performed by professional percussionist Michael Beauclerc.

== Track listing ==
1. "Life On The Road"
2. "I like toast" (banter)
3. "New Car Smell"
4. "Waltz, waltz, Walt's" (banter)
5. "Hot Dog Song"
6. "Little Cuban Friend"
7. "I Am Not American"
8. "Allies land in Normandy" (banter)
9. "The Golf Song"
10. "All the Lego in Scandinavia" (banter)
11. "I Pulled My Groin"
12. "So disappointed by you all" (banter)
13. "Bottle Of Booze"
14. "Circulation Man" (banter)
15. "Head In The Freezer"
16. "The Monkey Song"
17. "Take your shirt off" (banter)
18. "Particle Board"
19. "Shipwreck Balladeer"
20. "The Coffee Song"
21. "We're very ethnic" (banter)
22. "Trip To Greece"
23. "Wolfe Island Ferry"
24. "Thank you very much" (banter)
