= Torpid (album) =

Live album by The Arrogant Worms
- Released: September 2008
- Genre: Comedy
- Label: Arrogant Worms Records

The Arrogant Worms chronology
| Beige (2006) | Torpid (2008) | Hindsight 20/20 (2010) |

Torpid is an album by the Canadian comedy music group, The Arrogant Worms. Torpid was the twelfth album for the band and was released on September 30, 2008.

Torpid was recorded in the year 2008 during three shows at the Kingston Brewing Company. All three shows were fundraisers for the Music Instrument Lending Library, which lets Kingston residents borrow musical instruments for free.

== Track listing ==
1. "Big Box Store"
2. "Banter"
3. "Hollywood Girl"
4. "Cellphone Vigilante"
5. "Boring"
6. "Banter"
7. "Blah Blah Blah Blah Blah Blah"
8. "The Me Song"
9. "I Got Fingers"
10. "Banter"
11. "Uncle Lou"
12. "She Talks During Movies"
13. "My Neighbour's Learning Saxophone"
14. "Punk Rocker"
15. "Banter"
16. "My Boy"
17. "Banter"
18. "If I Were Prime Minister"
19. "Reprise"
