= Christian Rodska =

British actor (1945–2024)

- Born: Christian Rodskjaer; 5 September 1945; Cullercoats, Northumberland, England
- Died: 21 March 2024 (aged 78)
- Occupation: Actor
- Years active: 1968–2024

Christian Rodska (born Christian Rodskjaer; 5 September 1945 – 21 March 2024) was an English actor who appeared in many television and radio series and narrated a number of audiobooks, including Sir Winston Churchill's Nobel Prize winning The Second World War. He is perhaps best known for his regular role as Ron Stryker in 1970s series, Follyfoot.

== Career ==
Rodska began acting professionally in the late 1960s and got his first big break when he was chosen to appear in Follyfoot, which ran for three years from 1971 to 1973. From then on, he appeared in numerous series such as the 1977 BBC adaptation of Rosemary Sutcliff's The Eagle of the Ninth, in which he played Esca, and the film version of The Likely Lads, Z-Cars, The Tomorrow People, Coronation Street, Brookside, Bergerac and Casualty, and Duncan Fraser in the feature-length Tenko Christmas special Reunion. More recently he worked extensively as a voice artist, featuring in many radio plays and on Audiobooks. He was known for his narration of Ice Road Truckers on the Discovery Channel, as well as MegaStructures for British channel, Five. In 2004, Rodska guest-starred in the Doctor Who audio drama Faith Stealer. He continued to act on television, recently appearing on Doc Martin and as DI Dennis Carter in the BBC's 55 Degrees North, and in the 2008 drama Margaret Thatcher - The Long Walk to Finchley. He was also the narrator for the series The Future Is Wild. On TV he played Winston Churchill three times (in l'Appel du 18 Juin for France 2, for the BBC and on The History Channel), 'Bomber' Harris, Captain Smith of the Titanic, Neil Kinnock, Lord Beaverbrook, and President Truman.

== Personal life ==
Rodska was born in Cullercoats, Northumberland. He was the son of a Danish sailor, who was at one time the Captain of the Royal Yacht of King Faisal of Iraq. Rodska was married to a French woman, Jacqueline Mousny, while in Follyfoot and they had a son, Benjamin, who played the lead role in the 1985 television adaptation of Oliver Twist, in which his father also appeared and a daughter, Camille. He was later married to Barbara Kellermann.

Christian Rodska died from cancer on 21 March 2024 at the age of 78.
