= The Arrogant Worms (album) =

Studio album by The Arrogant Worms
- Released: 1992
- Genre: Comedy
- Label: Festival Records

The Arrogant Worms chronology
The Arrogant Worms (1992)	Russell's Shorts (1994)

The Arrogant Worms is the self-titled debut album of the Canadian comedy music group The Arrogant Worms. It was released in 1992. It was the only album to include bassist Steve Wood, who left the band afterwards. The role of bass would be taken over by John Whytock, and later by Chris Patterson.

== "The Last Saskatchewan Pirate" ==
"The Last Saskatchewan Pirate" is one of The Arrogant Worms' more popular songs, about a down-and-out farmer who takes up piracy on the Saskatchewan River, stealing shipments of grain and farm equipment from ships and barges. He goes on about a Mountie who attempts to capture him, but fails and loses his job, and proceeds to join the crew. In the end, he comments about the arrival of winter and the river freezing over, and that he's off to New Mexico to plunder there during the winter.

Live versions of this song have been included on The Arrogant Worms albums Live Bait (1997) and Semi-Conducted (2002).

The song was later covered by Captain Tractor, on their album East of Edson (1995), but the line "Cause they know that Tractor Jack is hidin' in the bay..." was changed to "Cause they know that Captain Tractor is hidin' in the bay". Hoja, a Canadian a cappella group, covered the song on their album, Have You Herd?. This song has also been covered by Canadian country singer Brad Johner. The Longest Johns covered the song as "The Last Bristolian Pirate", with some of the lyrics and geographical references changed to British equivalents along the River Severn. The Scottish metal band Alestorm covered the song on their 2024 EP Voyage of the Dead Maurader.

The song is often played during the "third quarter stretch" at the Regina home games of the Canadian Football League's Saskatchewan Roughriders, using a shortened loop highlighting the lyric "on Regina's mighty shores"; in reality, the closest the Saskatchewan river system gets to Regina is Lake Diefenbaker, a bifurcation lake on the South Saskatchewan River, roughly 140 kilometres (87 mi) to their west-northwest, though the sentiment of the Roughriders, like the general fun of the song's references to the fearful pirates, is an equally lighthearted comparison.

== Track listing ==
1. "The Last Saskatchewan Pirate"
2. "The Credit Song"
3. "Let's Go Bowling"
4. "Goin' Huntin'"
5. "Don't Go Into Politics"
6. "No Sale/No Store"
7. "The Canadian Crisis Song"
8. "The Ballad of Dan"
9. "Car Full of Pain"
10. "I Want to Look Like Arnold"
11. "Jesus' Brother Bob"
12. "The Christmas Song"
