= Hindsight 20/20 (album) =

Greatest hits album by The Arrogant Worms
- Released: July 2013
- Genre: Comedy
- Label: Arrogant Worms Records

The Arrogant Worms chronology
Torpid (2008)	Hindsight 20/20 (2013)	SPACE (2014)

Hindsight 20/20 is a greatest hits compilation album by the Canadian comedy music group The Arrogant Worms. The album consists of twenty songs spanning the band’s twenty-year career and a dance remix of "The Last Saskatchewan Pirate."

== Track listing ==
1. The Last Saskatchewan Pirate
2. Pressure Washer
3. Uncle Lou
4. I Am Cow
5. Jesus' Brother Bob
6. Rippy The Gator
7. The Mounted Animal Nature Trail
8. Rocks And Trees
9. Celine Dion
10. Big Box Store
11. Canada's Really Big
12. I Ran Away
13. Mime Abduction Song
14. The Happy Happy Birthday Song
15. Carrot Juice Is Murder
16. Go To Sleep Little Leech
17. Me Like Hockey
18. Big Fat Road Manager
19. Santa's Gonna Kick Your Ass
20. We Are The Beaver
21. Dance Club Remix: The Last Saskatchewan Pirate
