= In Defence =

- Genre: Legal drama
- Created by: Mike Cullen
- Written by: Maxwell Young; Abigail Fray
- Directed by: Roy Battersby; Simon Massey
- Starring: Ross Kemp; Sophie Okonedo; Brigid Zengeni; Jeff Nuttall; Aden Gillett
- Composer: Debbie Wiseman
- Country of origin: United Kingdom
- Original language: English
- No. of series: 1
- No. of episodes: 4

Production
- Executive producers: Susan Hogg; Simon Lewis
- Producer: Helen Gregory
- Production locations: London, United Kingdom
- Cinematography: James Aspinall
- Editors: Anne Sopel; David Spiers
- Running time: 90 minutes
- Production company: Granada Television

Original release
- Network: ITV
- Release: 26 June – 17 July 2000

In Defence is a four-part British television legal drama series, created and partially written by Mike Cullen, that first broadcast on ITV on 26 June 2000. The series stars Ross Kemp and Sophie Okonedo, and follows Sam Lucas (Kemp), a lawyer and legal detective, who leaves his job at the CPS after exposing a police cover-up to work alongside his former lover, Bernie Kramer (Okonedo) at a private law firm.

The series was co-written by Maxwell Young and Abigail Fray, and was initially billed as a "star-vehicle" for Kemp, as part of a "golden handcuffs" deal to lure Kemp away from the BBC. The series broadcast weekly until 17 July 2000.

== Production ==
In Defence was co-produced by Helen Gregory and Louise Mutter through Granada Television, and was one of a number of projects commissioned by the broadcaster as "star vehicles" for Ross Kemp.

Despite rumours that a second series was in the pipeline, no further episodes were produced, and in November 2000, the series was axed by ITV's then head-of-drama, Nick Elliott. A behind-the-scenes documentary, Best Defence, directed by filmmaker Peter Markham, was broadcast alongside the series, detailing the journey from commission to production, as well as interviews with the cast and behind the scenes footage from the set.

== Broadcast ==
The first episode drew in just more than seven million viewers, although by the end of this series, figures had dropped to just 4.9 million. Poor ratings led to the series being axed by ITV, which in turn led to discussions regarding Kemp's contract with the broadcaster.

However, following the success of Without Motive, a fellow ITV stablemate which Kemp filmed concurrently alongside In Defence, his contract was renewed, with a second series of Without Motive commissioned.

The series has yet to be released on DVD, but was made available on streaming sites such as Prime Video, Britbox and Tubi in the US as of 2025.

== Cast ==
=== Main ===
- Ross Kemp as Sam Lucas
- Sophie Okonedo as Bernie Kramer
- Brigid Zengeni as Martha Wilson
- Jeff Nuttall as Geoff Whelan
- Aden Gillett as James Glayzer

=== Supporting ===
==== Episode 1 ====
- Liz May Brice as PC Sally Higson
- Mark Wakeling as PC Crispin Mills
- Stuart Graham as DI Paul Howard
- Peter Wight as DCI George Mercer
- James Laurenson as Michael Foulds QC
- Lorna Heilbron as Karen Squires QC

==== Episode 2 ====
- Bill Fellows as DCI Bobby Calvert
- Stephen Mangan as John Henderson
- Luisa Bradshaw-White as Jackie Ellmann
- Louisa Millwood-Haigh as Alex Ellmann
- Ellen Thomas as Mrs. Hope

==== Episode 3 ====
- Idris Elba as PC Paul Fraser
- Jason Pitt as PC Steve Breeze
- Ian McElhinney as DCS David Dillne
- Vincent Pickering as DS Frank Burns
- Nick Day as DCI Brian Minter
- Timothy Davies as William Cole QC

==== Episode 4 ====
- Nicholas Hewetson as DI Duncan Greig
- John McArdle as DCI Brian Walsh
- Stanley Townsend as Jack Gower
- Gabrielle Hamilton as Tilly Kramer
- Ursula Mohan as Ruth Kramer
- Darrel D'Silva as Terry Shepherd

== Episodes ==
No.	Title	Directed by	Written by	Original release date	UK viewers (millions)
1	"Episode 1"	Roy Battersby	Mike Cullen	26 June 2000	7.03
A woman is found brutally murdered on the tracks at a train terminus, bearing the hallmarks of two similar murders committed by the now incarcerated paedophile and pimp Sean Moore. The PC who discovered the body, Sally Higson, is sent to inform the victim’s husband, and in the process, unwittingly transfers forensic evidence which leads the police to suspect the husband of murder. Higson subsequently suffers a breakdown, and is sent home on medical leave. Aware of an upcoming appeal for Moore’s release, the lead officer on the case, DI Paul Howard, tries to bury any evidence that Higson was ever involved in the discovery of the body, or that the murder has any connection to Moore’s victims. Sam Lucas, the CPS attaché, grows close to Higson, and unable to let his conscience go, decides to resign from his job and testify in court in an attempt to stop an innocent man going to prison.
2	"Episode 2"	Roy Battersby	Maxwell Young	3 July 2000	5.75
After accepting a new job at Whelan’s, Sam snatches his first case from Bernie - an appeal. Jackie Ellman, a prostitute and smack addict, has been imprisoned for causing death by arson, accusing of setting fire to a fellow junkie’s flat. A new witness has reportedly come forward, claiming to have seen a mystery man outside the flat just before the fire began. Sam suspects the man may be Paul Cox, a local dealer who had previously accosted the victim for an unpaid drug debt. However, when Sam discovers Cox is a police informant and has an alibi in the form of a senior police officer, he is forced to take a second look at who the mystery man seen by the witness might be.
3	"Episode 3"	Simon Massey	Abigail Fray	10 July 2000	5.63
The attempted escape of three prisoners from a local custody suite results in a death. PCs Fraser and Breeze are charged with the murder of Craig Kelly by unreasonable force. Lucas is charged with representing both men, until at a pre-trial hearing, the prosecution announces that it intends to drop the case against Breeze and instead solely prosecute Fraser for the murder. Fraser’s wife claims he has long suffered racial abuse at the hands of his colleagues, and his incarceration is simply an attempt by the Met to cover up a white-on-black killing. Lucas attempts to plea Fraser’s case by getting a corroborating witness statement from a police doctor caught up in the incident. Meanwhile, Bernie questions her future as a lawyer after trying to defend a man on death row in Jamaica.
4	"Episode 4"	Simon Massey	Mike Cullen	17 July 2000	4.91
Alice Gower, a respected child therapist and wife of prominent celebrity doctor Jack Gower, is found murdered in her own home. With Bernie still on leave, Sam offers to take Gower's case. With very little evidence to suggest a credible suspect, the police begin to drip-feed information to local journalist Terry Shepherd, who paints an unsavoury picture of Gower as an unstable alcoholic in the press. And when Gower's alibi for the time of the murder falls apart, his innocence is called into question. Sam tries to get Gower clean in order to help jog his memory of the events that occurred on the night in question, but is later himself arrested for his trouble. And when Bernie gets wind of a possible alternative suspect, her pursuit of the truth leads her into potential danger.
