= CKWS-FM =

Hot adult contemporary radio station in Kingston, Ontario

Coordinates: 44°10′02″N 76°25′39″W

- Kingston, Ontario; Canada
- Broadcast area: Eastern Ontario
- Frequency: 104.3 MHz
- Branding: 104.3 Fresh Radio

Programming
- Format: Hot adult contemporary
- Affiliations: Kingston Frontenacs

Ownership
- Owner: Corus Entertainment; (Corus Premium Television Ltd.)
- Sister stations: CFMK-FM, CKWS-DT

History
- First air date: August 31, 1942
- Former call signs: CKWS (1942–1987); CFFX (1987–2007); CFFX-FM (2007–2010)
- Former frequencies: 960 kHz (1942–2007)
- Call sign meaning: Kingston Whig-Standard

Technical information
- Licensing authority: CRTC
- Class: B
- ERP: 4,000 watts (average); 8,000 watts (peak)
- HAAT: 247.9 metres (813 ft)

Links
- Website: 1043freshradio.ca

CKWS-FM (104.3 FM) is a Canadian radio station in Kingston, Ontario. The station airs a hot adult contemporary format branded on-air as 104.3 Fresh Radio. The station is owned by Corus Entertainment, which also owns CFMK-FM and CKWS-DT.

== History ==
The station was launched in 1942 as CKWS, a CBC radio affiliate taking over CBC responsibilities from Queen's University radio station CFRC. When CKLC launched in 1953, it became affiliated with the CBC's second network, the Dominion Network, while CKWS remained with the main CBC network, the Trans-Canada Network (later CBC Radio). Broadcasting on 960 AM, CKWS was owned by Allied Broadcasting, a partnership of Roy Thomson and Rupert Davies, owner of the Kingston Whig-Standard newspaper. The call letters were derived from the newspaper's name, as was common at the time.

FM sister station CKWS-FM (now CFMK-FM) signed on in 1947 (originally as CKWR-FM), and CKWS-TV launched in 1954. For most of the 1960s and 1970s, CKWS battled local rival CKLC for listenership, since both stations had adopted a similar Top 40 format, although CKWS always carried more news and community programming.

The stations were purchased by Paul Desmarais and Claude Pratte in 1977. CKWS disaffiliated from CBC Radio in 1978 with the opening of CBCK-FM. In 1982, the station would move to new studios on Counter Street. In 1987, the station became part of Desmarais' Power Corporation and adopted the call letters CFFX, as it would no longer be associated with the television station, which retained the CKWS name. At the same time, CFMK-FM relocated its studios to the Counter Street location.

The stations were subsequently sold to their current owner, Corus Entertainment, in 2000, at which time they were "reunited" with the television station and moved back to the studios on Queen Street.

On February 14, 2005, the CRTC denied an application by 591989 B.C. Ltd., a subsidiary of Corus Entertainment Inc. to operate a low-power FM transmitter in Kingston. The proposed transmitter would operate at 93.7 MHz with an effective radiated power of 50 watts. The applicant indicated that approval of its proposal would improve the quality of CFFX's signal in Kingston's downtown core. Corus stated that in the central core area of Kingston, the CFFX signal dropped significantly in volume and that it was weak, or very weak, in shopping centres. The licensee further stated that while both AM and FM signals would experience signal degradation in downtown areas, AM signals were significantly more susceptible to electrical noise and interference from computers and similar devices. Corus stated, with respect to the use of the FM spectrum, that it had evaluated the availability of low-power FM frequencies, and found that numerous channels of that type were available for use in Kingston.

=== Conversion to FM and format changes ===
As of 2007, CFFX was carrying an oldies format as Oldies 960. In April 2007, CFFX applied to move to FM, and was given approval by the CRTC on August 28, 2007. In September, CFFX began testing at 104.3 FM playing a wide variety of different music formats.

On October 15, 2007, CFFX moved from 960 AM to 104.3 FM, adopting an adult contemporary format as Lite 104.3. Because of CRTC regulations, oldies was not yet allowed on FM radio, necessitating a change of formats. At midnight on the evening of January 14, 2008, the AM frequency began a final test of their equipment using their 10,000 watt daytime directional antenna. At the top of each hour, on both AM and FM stations, a special announcement was broadcast, followed by special test material, including morse code and sweep tones. This lasted for several minutes before returning to regular programming. This test was repeated again at 1:00 AM and 2:00 AM. The 960 AM signal was turned off at 6:00 AM EST on January 15, 2008.

On August 19, 2010, after the CRTC allowed oldies on FM radio, the station changed its format back to a classic hits format, as well as changing its call sign to CKWS-FM, regaining the CKWS calls it lost back in 1987 as an AM station.

On February 24, 2014, the station flipped back to adult contemporary as Hits 104.3. On February 13, 2015, the station rebranded to 104.3 Fresh Radio and changed its format to hot adult contemporary.

In July 2024, as a result of company-wide cuts by Corus Entertainment, CKWS and CFMK laid off the entirety of their local airstaff. They were replaced by voice tracked talent from other markets. Corus stated that the voice tracked content would remain locally relevant to Kingston.
