= Idiot Road =

Studio album by The Arrogant Worms
- Released: September 19, 2001
- Genre: Comedy
- Length: 34:00
- Label: Arrogant Worms

The Arrogant Worms chronology
Dirt! (1999)	Idiot Road (2001)	Gift Wrapped (2002)

Professional ratings
Review scores
Source	Rating
Allmusic	3/5 stars

Idiot Road is the seventh album by the Canadian musical comedy group The Arrogant Worms. It was released in 2001.

== Background ==
According to band member Trevor Strong, the song "Worst Seat on the Plane" was never performed live due to Idiot Road being released on September 19, 2001, the week after the September 11 attacks. He also states that Idiot Road is probably his least favourite Arrogant Worms album.

== Track listing ==
No.	Title	Length
1.	"Idiot Road"	3:05
2.	"Boy Band"	3:41
3.	"We Are the Beaver"	4:06
4.	"Baby Poo"	1:37
5.	"Fuzzy Dice"	3:27
6.	"I Ran Away"	3:10
7.	"Trichinosis"	1:52
8.	"Billy the Theme Park Shark"	2:28
9.	"Stalker Girl"	3:01
10.	"Worst Seat on the Plane"	2:39
11.	"Really Scary"	2:10
12.	"Drink With Me"	2:44

Bonus track on CD release
No.	Title	Length
13.	"Mrs. Catto Loves Her Budgie"
