= C'est Cheese =

Studio album by The Arrogant Worms
- Released: 1995
- Genre: Comedy
- Label: Arrogant Worms Records

The Arrogant Worms chronology
Russell's Shorts (1994)	C'est Cheese (1995)	Live Bait (1997)

Professional ratings
Review scores
Source	Rating
Allmusic	3/5 stars

C'est Cheese is the third album of the Canadian comedy music group The Arrogant Worms. It was released in 1995. It was the last album for co-founder John Whytock, and the first appearance of Chris Patterson, who replaced Whytock on bass guitar onstage. Many of the songs on which Whytock took lead vocal were also passed down to Patterson for concert performance.

== Track listing ==
1. "Sam, the Guy from Quincy"
2. "Kill the Dog Next Door"
3. "Lonely Lab of Broken Hearts"
4. "Sex, Drugs & RRSPs"
5. "History Is Made by Stupid People"
6. "My Voice Is Changing"
7. "Proud to Be a Banker"
8. "Horizon"
9. "The Happy Happy Birthday Song"
10. "Dangerous"
11. "The Mountie Song"
12. "Dog Food Woman"
13. "Mounted Animal Nature Trail"
14. "A Real Letter from a Real Yahoo"
15. "Let There Be Guns"
