= CKWS-DT =

Television station in Kingston, Ontario

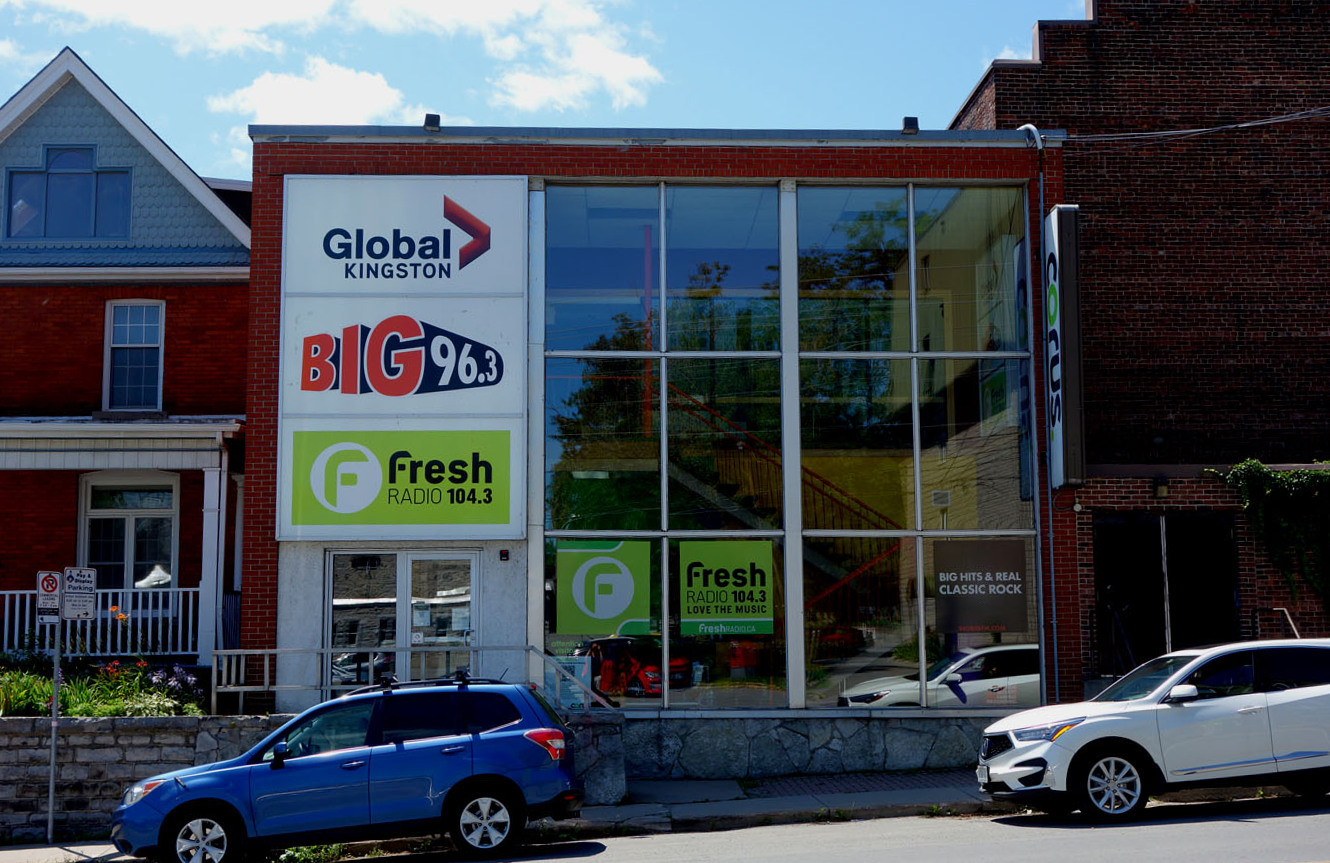
- Global Kingston's former studios on Queen Street in downtown Kingston.
- Kingston, Ontario; Canada
- Channels: Digital: 11 (VHF); Virtual: 11
- Branding: Global Kingston; CKWS News on Global Kingston

Programming
- Affiliations: 11.1: Global

Ownership
- Owner: Corus Entertainment; (591987 B.C. Ltd.)
- Sister stations: CHEX-DT, CIII-DT, CFMK-FM, CKWS-FM

History
- First air date: December 18, 1954
- Former call signs: CKWS-TV (1954–2013)
- Former channel numbers: Analog: 11 (VHF, 1954–2013)
- Former affiliations: CBC (1954–2015); CTV (2015–2018)
- Call sign meaning: The Kingston Whig-Standard

Technical information
- Licensing authority: CRTC
- ERP: 9.4 kW
- HAAT: 312.5 m (1,025 ft)
- Transmitter coordinates: 44°9′59″N 76°25′28″W
- Translator(s): see § Transmitters

Links
- Website: Global Kingston

CKWS-DT (channel 11) is a television station in Kingston, Ontario, Canada, owned and operated by the Global Television Network, a division of Corus Entertainment. The station formerly maintained studios at 170 Queen Street in downtown Kingston, now operating from offices at 574 Princess Street, and its transmitter is located near Highway 95 on Wolfe Island, south of the city.

== History ==
1987 logo of CKWS-TV

CKWS signed-on December 18, 1954, as an affiliate of the CBC network. It was originally a joint venture between Roy Thomson and the Davies family, owners of The Kingston Whig-Standard (the source of its callsign). The station has been sold three times: to the Kanatec Corporation, bought by Power Corporation in 1977 and to Corus in 1999.

Children across the country were exposed to CKWS programming in the late 1970s and 1980s by the Harrigan series – a particularly innocent and low budget show about a leprechaun, starring Barry Dale. Shelagh Rogers of CBC Radio fame started out presenting the weather for the station's newscasts.

During its days as a private CBC affiliate, it aired the minimum amount of CBC programming (40 hours per week).

On May 20, 2015, Corus and Bell Media announced an agreement whereby Corus' CBC affiliates, including CKWS, would leave the public network and instead "affiliate" with CTV. The switch took effect on August 31, 2015. Most TV service providers serving the region also carry CBC owned-and-operated station CBOT Ottawa, and any that did not have to add a CBC affiliate such as CBOT to their basic services to comply with Canadian Radio-television and Telecommunications Commission (CRTC) regulations. Legally, the partnership was described as a "program supply agreement", and not as an "affiliation" (a term with specific legal implications under CRTC rules), as Corus maintained editorial control over the stations' programming and the ability to sell local advertising, and did not delegate responsibility for CTV programs aired by the station to Bell Media. Affiliations also require the consent of the CRTC.

The switch was approved by the CRTC on August 27, 2015, when it dismissed objections by Rogers Media (who argued that the change was an "affiliation" and thus required CRTC consent to implement, and was not in the public interest because it created duplicate sources of CTV programming), and by a resident who complained that as he only received television over the air, he would lose his ability to receive CBC Television as a result of the disaffiliation.

On August 14, 2018, it was announced that CKWS' agreement with CTV would expire on August 27; the station subsequently became a Global owned-and-operated station, rebranding itself as Global Kingston.

== News programming ==
Until 2024, CKWS produced 28 hours per week of local news programming, with 4 1/2 hours each weekday, and one hour on Saturdays and Sundays. Prior to 2018, the station did not air any news programs on Sundays.

In September 2016, CKWS began to align its news programming with Global News rather than CTV News; it added airings of Global National in September 2016, and introduced a local morning show, The Morning Show (which was patterned after the Global News Morning format used in other markets, and shared its branding with the program of the same name aired by Global flagship station CIII-DT in Toronto), on October 17, 2016, replacing CTV's national morning show Your Morning. At the same time, the station's noon newscast was shortened to half an hour, the CTV National News was dropped, and the station rebranded its newscasts from Newswatch to CKWS News.

Due to cuts by Corus Entertainment, most of CKWS's staff were laid off in July 2024, including much of the news department. Both CKWS and CHEX's newscasts were suspended for a period, before returning in a regionalized format using contributions from local reporters. Corus stated that it had "reimagined our broadcast schedule in Kingston, Peterborough, and Kelowna with a focus on supper hour and late-night news programming".

Logo of CKWS used until October 2016

=== Notable former on-air staff ===
- Bill Luxton – first program director and news anchor
- Wayne Rostad – host
- Bill Welychka – anchor; also producer

== Technical information ==
=== Subchannels ===
Subchannels of CKWS-DT
Subchannel	Res.	Short name	Programming
11.1	1080i	CKWS-DT	Global
2.1	1080i	CIII-DT	Global Toronto (CIII-DT)

Simulcast of subchannels of another station

=== Analog-to-digital conversion ===
In January 2013, CKWS applied to the CRTC to convert its main Kingston transmitter to digital. The station had not announced plans to convert its transmitters in Prescott and Smiths Falls to digital, but did convert its Brighton translator CKWS-TV-1 to digital channel 30 on August 31, 2011, as its former analog UHF channel 66 is now out-of-band. The Brighton digital signal was not initially broadcast in HD as it went on-air before CKWS converted its cable TV feed (and, later, its main signal) to high-definition digital TV.

The main CKWS transmitter at Wolfe Island/Kingston flash cut to digital on July 5, 2013, on its existing frequency, VHF channel 11. The station was not obligated to convert this transmitter, as Kingston was not one of the 31 markets in which the CRTC imposed a mandatory analog shutdown on August 31, 2011.

=== Transmitters ===
Station	City of licence	Channel	ERP	HAAT	Transmitter coordinates
CKWS-DT-2	Prescott	Digital: 28 (UHF); Virtual: 26	0.13 kW	118.2 m (388 ft)	44°49′55″N 75°31′16″W

==== Former transmitters ====
Station	City of licence	Channel	ERP	HAAT	Transmitter coordinates
CKWS-TV-3	Smiths Falls	36 (UHF)	10 kW	100 m (328 ft)	45°0′42″N 76°3′16″W
CKWS-DT-1	Brighton	Digital: 23 (UHF); Virtual: 30	0.938 kW	158.6 m (520 ft)	44°2′40″N 77°47′35″W

Although CKWS' Smiths Falls repeater overlapped its signal with that of CBC owned-and-operated station CBOT/Ottawa while CKWS was a CBC affiliate, CKWS-TV-3 usually served the Brockville area, along with the station's Prescott rebroadcaster. In 2018, Corus applied to the CRTC to shut down several of its transmitters, including CKWS-TV-3.

As a result of a CRTC decision in December 2020, CKWS-DT-1 shuttered its transmitter in Brighton on August 31, 2022. CKWS-DT-1 is now available via a subchannel of CHEX-DT out of Peterborough. CKWS-DT-1 briefly broadcast on UHF 23 (virtual channel 30) before ultimately being shuttered as it was required to vacate UHF 30 as a result of the DTV repack.

== See also ==
- CKWS-FM (formerly CKWS AM)
- CFMK-FM (formerly CKWS-FM)
