= Live Bait (album) =

Live album by The Arrogant Worms
- Released: 1997
- Recorded: October 1996 through January 1997
- Genre: Comedy
- Label: Arrogant Worms Records

The Arrogant Worms chronology
C'est Cheese (1995)	Live Bait (1997)	Christmas Turkey (1997)

Live Bait is a 1997 live album by the Canadian comedy music group The Arrogant Worms. It features concert versions of some of the songs from their previous releases plus some new material. The cover notes for the album feature an absurdist history of the band.

== Track listing ==
1. "Jesus' Brother Bob"
2. "The Mountie Song"
3. "Canada's Really Big"
4. "Me Like Hockey"
5. "Proud to be Canadian"
6. "Malcolm"
7. "TV Weather Guy"
8. "The Ballad of Dan"
9. "Car Full of Pain"
10. "Mounted Animal Nature Trail"
11. "Carrot Juice is Murder"
12. "The Last Saskatchewan Pirate"
