= CFRC-FM =

Radio station at Queen's University in Ontario, Canada

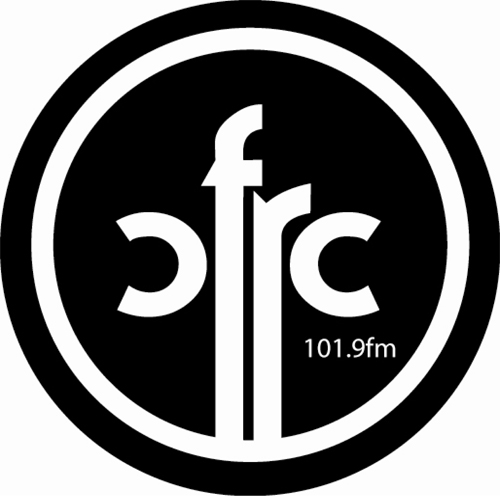
- Kingston, Ontario; Canada
- Frequency: 101.9 MHz
- Branding: CFRC 101.9 FM

Programming
- Format: Campus, community
- Affiliations: CRBC (1934–1936), CBC (1936–1942)

Ownership
- Owner: Radio Queen's University

History
- First air date: October 7, 1922 (on AM); 1954 (CFRC-FM)
- Former call signs: 9BT (1922–1923)
- Former frequencies: 450 m (c. 1923–1925); 1120 kHz (1925–1930); 930 kHz (1930–1933); 915 kHz (c. 1933); 1510 kHz (1933–1941); 1490 kHz (1941–1990); 91.9 MHz (1954–1990)

Technical information
- Class: A
- ERP: 3,000 watts
- HAAT: 90 metres (300 ft)
- Transmitter coordinates: 44°17′24″N 76°25′54″W

Links
- Website: www.cfrc.ca

CFRC-FM (101.9 MHz) is the non-commercial campus radio station at Queen's University in Kingston, Ontario, Canada. The station has one of the longest radio histories in Canada, with experimental broadcasts dating back to 1922 and serves Queen's University students and faculty as well as the greater Kingston community. CFRC-FM is also a member of the National Campus and Community Radio Association.

CFRC-FM has an effective radiated power (ERP) of 3,000 watts. The transmitter is on Station Road in Kingston, near the Macdonald-Cartier Freeway (Ontario Highway 401).

== History ==
A comprehensive oral history of the station was compiled by Arthur Zimmerman, which was broadcast on the station in 1982 and was published in book form in 1991.

Radio technology has a surprisingly long history in Kingston, dating back to the early radio experimentations of Queen's first Professor of General Engineering, James Lester Willis Gill. He mounted the first public exhibition of wireless telegraphy at a Queen's Convocation lecture on April 28, 1902, only four months after Guglielmo Marconi's first successful trans-Atlantic transmission from Signal Hill. By the 1910s regular courses on wireless technology and theory were being taught by Gill, and Professor Gill set up the Queen's wireless telegraph sets at Barriefield war Camp in 1915 and contributed directly to the use of wireless and radio technologies by the Allied forces during World War I.

An informal wireless club was formed by a group of Gill's students, who kept experimenting with the latest available wireless technology. With the help of Professor Douglas Jemmett an experimental station license (9BT) was obtained in the spring of 1922. The station's equipment was housed in the basement (later moved to the second floor) of the Electrical Engineering building, Fleming Hall (named after Sir Sandford Fleming). It had a power output of approximately 250 watts, and had an estimated range of 160 kilometres. While there were likely some preliminary, unscheduled broadcasts by 9BT, the station's first scheduled public broadcast was on October 7, 1922, as Professor Richard O. Jolliffe called the football game between Queen's and McGill. At that time, the university's football/rugby team, the Queen's Tricolour, were the winners of the Grey Cup for three consecutive years, and it is a common myth that when the current call letters CFRC were assigned, their meaning was "Canada's Famous Rugby Champions"; this acronym being possible, however, was purely coincidental. Some student broadcasters also said that CFRC meant "Crazy Fellows Raising Cain".

An alumnus donation in early 1923 made possible the acquisition of better, more reliable transmitting equipment, and a private commercial licence was obtained under the call letters CFRC by July 1923. CFRC was Kingston's only radio station and began airing programs from the new Canadian Radio Broadcasting Commission in 1934, becoming a full affiliate in 1936 in a commercial partnership with The Kingston Whig-Standard newspaper. With the replacement of the CRBC with the Canadian Broadcasting Corporation in 1936, CFRC became an affiliate.

In 1938, in what was possibly the station's most notable broadcast, United States President Franklin D. Roosevelt's convocation speech at the university was relayed by CFRC to all North American radio networks.

CFRC remained a CBC station for several years however, with a weak signal and with commercial limitations placed on it by the university (such as a ban on advertising for patent medicine), the Whig-Standard sought its own station and, in 1942, launched CKWS 960 (now an FM station), at which time CKWS acquired CFRC's CBC affiliation and its commercial license. In exchange for CKWS carrying some programming from the university, CFRC agreed not to compete commercially with CKWS for ten years and to only engage in broadcasts that filled the university's educational mandate. The station reverted to an experimental outlet for the university's Electrical Engineering Department until 1945 when it resumed programming on a limited basis as part of the Summer Radio Institute - a training program for broadcasters run with the CBC - and thereafter broadcasting non-commercial radio plays by the Queen's Drama Guild. Since the station originally began broadcasting, CFRC periodically changed frequencies until it settled on 1490 AM on March 29, 1941. In 1954, CFRC-FM began broadcasting at 91.9 MHz on the FM dial to simulcast the programming of CFRC 1490. In 1957, the university appointed Margaret Angus as its first director of radio and students formed the CFRC Radio Club to produce programming and operate the station under her supervision as a fully fledged campus radio station. In 1986, the Canadian Radio-television and Telecommunications Commission approved Radio Queen's application to change CFRC-FM's frequency from 91.9 MHz to its current FM frequency, 101.9 MHz. In 1990 the AM frequency went dark and all CFRC programming moved to the FM frequency (which had been broadcasting separate programming since 1970) and a new stereo transmitter.

The station was for many years the only campus radio station in Canada to be owned and operated by a university rather than by its students. This changed in 2003 when ownership and management of the station was transferred from the university to Queen's student government, the Alma Mater Society (AMS).

Due to changes in CRTC regulations, CFRC's ownership transitioned from 2012 to 2014 so that it became an autonomous service, no longer owned and operated by the AMS. As a registered non-profit corporation, CFRC 101.9 FM is owned and operated by Radio Queen's University.

CFRC also hosts a podcasting network providing training and resources for independent podcast production.

In the summer of 2024, Queens University station, CFRC-FM claimed to be the last local radio station outlet in Kingston after Corus Entertainment cut local media on two Kingston FM radio stations, CFMK-FM and CKWS-FM.

== CFRC Sports ==
CFRC has for years provided regular coverage of all Queen's Golden Gaels regular season and playoff football games. Intermittently, they have also provided coverage of Golden Gaels hockey and basketball.

== Notable CFRC alumni ==
- Lorne Greene (1915–1987), CBC wartime announcer, later star of Bonanza and Battlestar Galactica
- Charles P. B. Taylor (1935–1997), radio/TV/print journalist (Reuters in London 1955–1962; The Globe and Mail in China 1962–1970s), author, horsebreeder (son of E. P. Taylor)
- Matthew Barber, musician
- Shelagh Rogers, CBC Radio personality
- Stu (Stuart) Mills, CBC Radio host (Ottawa Morning)
- Jeffrey Simpson, print journalist
- Gord Sinclair, musician
- The Arrogant Worms, musical group
- Chris Cuthbert, hockey & football commentator, TSN
- Peter Watts, football commentator, Calgary Stampeders (CHQR)
- Sandy Webster, actor
