= CFMK-FM =

Radio station in Kingston, Ontario, Canada

Coordinates: 44°10′02″N 76°25′39″W

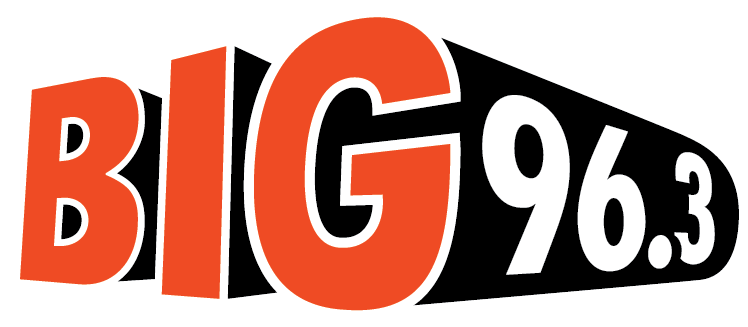
- Kingston, Ontario; Canada
- Broadcast area: Eastern Ontario
- Frequency: 96.3 MHz
- Branding: 96.3 Big FM

Programming
- Format: Classic hits

Ownership
- Owner: Corus Entertainment
- Sister stations: CKWS-FM, CKWS-DT

History
- First air date: May 14, 1947
- Former call signs: CKWR-FM (May–October 1947); CKWS-FM (October 1947 – 1976)
- Call sign meaning: FM Kingston

Technical information
- Licensing authority: CRTC
- Class: C1
- ERP: 14,000 watts (28,000 watts peak)
- HAAT: 247.9 metres (813 ft)

Links
- Website: 963bigfm.com

CFMK-FM (96.3 MHz) is a Canadian radio station in Kingston, Ontario, owned by Corus Entertainment. The station airs a classic hits format, leaning toward classic rock, and branded as 96.3 Big FM.

== History ==
The station was launched on May 14, 1947, as CKWR-FM, an FM simulcast of CKWS. Both stations were owned by Allied Broadcasting, in which the Kingston Whig-Standard was the primary partner. The station's call sign was changed to CKWS-FM in October of the same year, and Allied changed its name to Frontenac Broadcasting in 1954. The station adopted its current call sign in 1976.

In 1977, Paul Desmarais and Claude Pratte purchased Frontenac Broadcasting. In 1987, ownership was transferred directly to Desmarais' Power Corporation, and in 1989, Frontenac and another Power subsidiary, Kawartha Broadcasting, were merged to form Power Broadcasting.

In 1998, both the AM and FM stations were knocked off the air for a week by the Ice Storm of 1998.

The stations were purchased by Corus Entertainment in 2000. A country station for nearly three decades beginning in the late 1970s, CFMK adopted an adult hits format branded as Joe FM in 2004, and switched to a classic rock format branded as FM96 in 2007. On February 13, 2015, CFMK switched to a mainstream rock format and changed its slogan to "Kingston's Best Rock", but retained its "FM96" branding and featured rock music from the late 1960s to today. The "Kingston's Best Rock" slogan is also being used on CIKR-FM. CFMK's sister station, CKWS-FM rebranded its station on the same day.

On August 27, 2015, CFMK's website was replaced with a timer counting down to the following day at Noon, promoting "something exciting is coming soon". At that time, after playing "Can't Get Enough" by Bad Company, FM96 relaunched as 96.3 Big FM with a classic hits format, launching with a commercial free "Big 500 From A to Zed" countdown, playing 500 songs alphabetically and without interruption throughout the weekend before resuming its on-air programming on August 31, 2015. The change comes as CFMK registered a 2.3 share in the Spring 2015 Numeris ratings, placing it well behind CIKR-FM's 9.0 share and CKLC-FM's 6.6 share.

Due to budget cuts, all of the station's on-air personalities were laid off in July 2024. Corus announced that "BIG 96.3 and Fresh 104.3 will remain in Kingston, and the stations will utilize voice tracking to continue to produce local content made for and reflecting Kingston." After Corus' budget cuts, Queen's University radio station, CFRC-FM claimed to be the last local radio outlet in Kingston.

== Former Logos ==
CFMK-FM logo used from 2007 to 2015

Second FM96 logo
