= Bill Welychka =

Canadian television personality

- Born: Welland, Ontario, Canada
- Occupations: Television personality, journalist, author
- Years active: 1988–2024
- Employer(s): MuchMusic (1992–2005), Citytv (2005–2006), A-Channel (2006–2011), CKWS-TV (2012–2024)
- Notable work: A Happy Has-Been: Exciting Times and Lessons Learned by One of Canada's Foremost Entertainment Journalists

Bill Welychka is a Canadian television personality, best known as a VJ for MuchMusic and its sister station MuchMoreMusic from 1992 to 2005.

Born and raised in Welland, Ontario, Welychka first joined CHUM Limited in 1988 as a video editor for MuchMusic before transitioning to an on-air role as host of the channel's country music series Outlaws & Heroes in the early 1990s. In 1995, he became host of the world music show ClipTrip, as well as taking on regular duties as a general videoflow host. He stayed with Much for five more years until moving to MuchMoreMusic in April 2000.

In 2005, Welychka moved to CKEM in Edmonton to take on hosting duties with Breakfast Television when the station was rebranded as Citytv.

In September 2006, Welychka moved to A-Channel in Ottawa, as the new weather anchor, remaining in this role until 2011. The following year he joined CKWS-TV in Kingston. He also writes a column for the city's Kingston Whig-Standard, and is a contributor to CKWS's sister radio station CFMK-FM. In 2023, he wrote the autobiography A Happy Has-Been: Exciting Times and Lessons Learned by One of Canada's Foremost Entertainment Journalists.

His job with CKWS was eliminated in January 2024 in a round of cutbacks to Global News's local morning newscasts, although he remained a host on CFMK-FM until July 2024 when all of the station's on-air personalities were laid off.
