= Denise Donlon =

Canadian television executive

Denise Anne Donlon
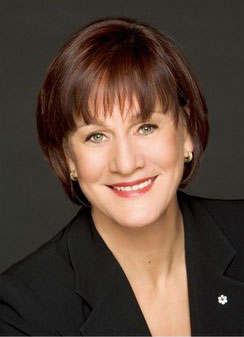
- Born: 22 February 1956 (age 69); Toronto, Ontario, Canada
- Spouse: Murray McLauchlan
- Awards: Order of Canada

Denise Anne Donlon, CM (born 22 February 1956) is a Canadian business executive, television producer, author, public speaker, host, and member of the Order of Canada.

Born in Toronto, Ontario, she joined MuchMusic in 1985 as a host and producer of The NewMusic. In 1992, she became the director of music programming, and was named vice-president and general manager in 1997 where she was responsible for programming direction and successfully launched MuchMoreMusic in 1998.

From 2000 to 2004, she was the president of Sony Music Canada where she led the company and a team of over 300 employees.

On 17 September 2008, Donlon was named executive director of CBC Radio's English-language services. She left the CBC in August 2011 and was succeeded by her 2nd in command, Chris Boyce. From September 2013 to April 2014, Donlon hosted the TV program TheZoomer which she co-hosted with Conrad Black.

In November 2016, Donlon published an autobiography Fearless as Possible (Under the Circumstances).

== Awards and honours ==
Donlon is a member of the Canadian Broadcasters Hall of Fame from the Canadian Association of Broadcasters. In 2009, she was named one of Canada's Top 100 Powerful Women. That same year, she won the Rosalie Trailblazer Award at Canadian Music Week. She was Canadian Music Week's Broadcast Executive of the Year three times from 1993 to 1995. She won the Peter Gzowski Literacy Award of Merit (ABC Canada) in 2001, a Woman of Vision Award, and Woman of the Year from Canadian Women in Communications. She holds two Gemini Awards - Special Event Coverage - Election Night 93 and in 1992, as Producer for The NewMusic. She won a Golden Sheaf Award from the Yorkton Film Festival for "In Your Face - Violence in Music" in 1993.

She received the Walt Grealis Special Achievement Award at the 2018 Juno Awards for her contributions to the Canadian music industry.

== Boards and Committees ==
Donlon is a board member of the Governor General's Performing Arts Awards Foundation, a committee member of Canadian Journalists for Free Expression, a trustee of Lake Ontario Waterkeeper, and a committee member of MusiCounts. She holds two honorary doctorates from the University of Calgary and the University of Waterloo.

Donlon has produced various charitable events including the Clinton Giustra Sustainable Growth Initiative (2008), President Clinton's 60th birthday party (2007 with Frank Giustra and Sam Feldman) which raised over $21 million in one evening for the Clinton Global Initiative, documentaries for War Child Canada in Northern Uganda, Sierra Leone, and the Thai Burmese Border, Live 8 (Co-producer, Toronto 2006), Rock the Walk (Canada's Walk of Fame 2005/2006) and was involved with the Tsunami Concert of Hope event among others.

== Personal life ==
Donlon is married to Murray McLauchlan and they have a son.

== Publications ==
- Fearless as Possible (Under the Circumstances) ISBN 978-1487000028
