= The Arrogant Worms =

Canadian musical comedy trio

- Origin: Kingston, Ontario, Canada
- Genres: Comedy, folk
- Years active: 1991–present
- Labels: Festival Distribution, Oglio Records, Needlejuice Records
- Members: Trevor Strong; Mike McCormick; Chris Patterson
- Past members: John Whytock; Steve Wood
- Website: https://www.arrogantworms.com/

The Arrogant Worms are a Canadian musical comedy trio founded in 1991 that parodies many musical genres. They are well known for their humorous on-stage banter in addition to their music. The members have been Trevor Strong (vocals), Mike McCormick (guitar, vocals), and Chris Patterson (bass, vocals) since 1995.

Their best-known song is "The Last Saskatchewan Pirate", from their self-titled debut album.

== History ==
The Arrogant Worms formed in 1991, with its founding members being Trevor Strong, Mike McCormick, John Whytock, and Steve Wood. They began by performing musical comedy on campus radio station CFRC at Queen's University at Kingston, and quickly moved to doing the same on CBC Radio, particularly on Jack Farr's The Radio Show. Wood left the band in 1991. Whytock left in 1995, and was replaced by Chris Patterson.

The Worms have toured Canada, the United States, the United Kingdom, and Australia, playing to crowds as large as 100,000. They have played at celebrations on Parliament Hill in Ottawa, and at a concert in New York, United States's Central Park.

Since 1992 the Worms have released twenty-two albums and three compilations, mostly independently, with sales exceeding 175,000. Their songs pay homage, always humorously, to different genres and topics. In 2003, they released a CD and DVD that was recorded live with the Edmonton Symphony Orchestra. Some of their albums include contributions from prominent musicians, including Andy Thompson, Andrew Affleck, Gord Thompson, Adrian Dolan, Mike Ford, John Loughrey, Terry Tufts and Tim Readman, who is also their dialect coach.

Rock, folk, ballads, country, and children's music all have been genres parodied by the Worms. When not spoofing a particular style of music, the Worms' material pokes fun at various aspects of daily life in Canada with songs like "Canada's Really Big", "Me Like Hockey", "We Are the Beaver", "I Am Not American", and "Proud to Be Canadian".

They have also recorded music videos for three songs: "Big Fat Road Manager", "Carrot Juice Is Murder", and "The River (River of Snot)". The first two of these are included on the Three Worms and an Orchestra DVD, which includes appearances by Tom Cavanagh, Nathan Fillion and Kurt Browning.

The band has long supported the cause of literacy in Canada, and have twice won the Peter Gzowski Award for their efforts.

== Discography ==
Studio albums

- The Arrogant Worms (1992), Independent
- Russell's Shorts (1994), Festival Distribution
- C'est Cheese (1995), Festival Distribution
- Christmas Turkey (1998), Festival Distribution
- Dirt! (1999), Independent
- Idiot Road (2001), Independent
- Beige (2006), Independent
- SPACE (2014), Independent
- The First Farewell Album (2016), Independent
- Fan Funded Songs 2017 (2017), Independent
- Fan Funded Songs 2018 (2018), Independent
- Fan Funded Songs 2019 (2019), Independent
- Fan Funded Songs 2020 (2020), Independent
- Fan Funded Songs 2021 (2021), Independent
- Fan Funded Songs 2022 (2022), Independent
- Fan Funded Songs 2023 (2023), Independent
- Fan Funded Songs 2024 (2024), Independent
- Canadian Famous (2025), Independent

Live albums

- Live Bait (1997), Independent
- Semi-Conducted (live with the Edmonton Symphony Orchestra) (2003), Independent
- Toast! (2004), Independent
- Torpid (2008), Independent

Compilations

- Gift Wrapped (2002), Oglio Records
- Hindsight 20/20 (2013), Independent
- Completely Canadian Compilation (2015)

== Videos ==
- Three Worms and an Orchestra (DVD of Semi-Conducted performances and other original music videos) (2004)
