= Sean Fine (journalist) =

Canadian journalist

Sean Fine is a Canadian journalist. Fine has covered the justice beat at the Globe and Mail for the past decade.

== Career ==
In May 2015, Fine won the National Newspaper Award for his writing on politics.

In May 2018, Fine won the "beat reporting" award for "an examination of Canada's judicial system after time limits on criminal proceedings were imposed by the Supreme Court."

Fine was part of the team of four writers who won in May 2020 the John Wesley Dafoe Award "for breaking the news that the Prime Minister’s Office had pressured the justice minister to abandon prosecution of SNC-Lavalin, and a series of follow-up reports as the ensuing scandal grew."
