= Harrigan (TV series) =

Canadian children's television series

- Presented by: Barry Dale
- Country of origin: Canada
- Original language: English

Production
- Running time: 30 minutes

Original release
- Network: CJOH-TV (1969-1971); CKWS-TV (1971-1985)
- Release: 1969 – 1985

Harrigan is a Canadian children's television series in the 1970s and 1980s. The show starred Barry Dale as Harrigan, a leprechaun.

Harrigan was produced by Kingston, Ontario television station CKWS-TV, and aired across Canada in syndication.

Part of the theme song included the words: "H - A - double R - I - G - A - N ... it's Harr-i-gan!"

Portions of the half-hour program would involve the title character viewing hand drawn pictures submitted by his loyal fan-base of children by looking into his magical pot of gold. His co-star for these segments was Dale's daughter, Deb-Lyn. Miss Sunflower, who delivered the mail while riding a unicycle, was played by Dale's wife, Jo-Anna.

Another segment would have Harrigan sitting with his good puppet friend Mr. Green (also played by Deb-Lyn) as they read a book to the children watching.

The character originated at CJOH-TV in Ottawa, Ontario, where it ran for its first two seasons. The leprechaun originally appeared on a children's show called Sandbox at 7 a.m. on the CTV Television Network.

Dale suggested syndicating the television show, a request that the station manager was not willing to do. Lorne Freed of CKWS invited Dale to syndicate Harrigan from his station. Harrigan taped original shows until 1985 and then ran re-runs until 1992.

The Harrigan series won three CanPro Awards, which are the Canadian equivalent of the Emmy Awards for syndicated programs.

The Harrigan show is no longer running due to a technical issue. The show was recorded on large two-inch tapes that eventually wore out. At the time nobody thought to transfer the media to a longer-lasting media.

At CKWS, Dale was also promotions manager and for a time had a lunchtime variety show, but left in a dispute and started Godfatha Pizzas. Customers who recognized Dale and performed the song or a little jig, received an extra slice or topping.

The Dales moved to Arizona in 2001.
