= Thomas M. Harrigan =

American administrator

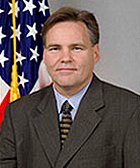
Thomas M. Harrigan, 2011

Thomas M. Harrigan was the Deputy Administrator for the United States Drug Enforcement Administration (DEA) and a DEA Special Agent for nearly 25 years. He was nominated by President Barack Obama to the position of DEA Deputy Administrator on February 18, 2011. He was confirmed as DEA Deputy Administrator by the United States Senate on March 29, 2012.

He was appointed as DEA's Chief of Operations in 2008 and is a principal advisor to DEA Administrator Michele M. Leonhart on all enforcement-related matters.

== DEA career history ==
Special Agent Harrigan began his career as a DEA Special Agent in 1987 in DEA's New York Field Division. Among the cases he was involved with were the notorious Rodriguez-Orejuela Drug Trafficking Organization case that led to the arrest and incarceration of several high-ranking members of this Colombian-based cartel and the seizure of multiple tons of cocaine and millions in illicit proceeds.

In 1994, he was assigned to the Bangkok Country Office in Thailand. While there he directed an investigation that led to the identification and dismantlement of an organization responsible for the importation of large quantities of heroin into the United States. This organization utilized dozens of Americans as couriers who smuggled heroin from Southeast Asia to Chicago.

In 1996 he was promoted to the position of Group Supervisor and returned to the United States to work in the Newark Field Division where he managed a DEA Task Force that was recognized by state and county officials for its significant enforcement achievements.

In 1999 he served as a Staff Coordinator in the Office of Congressional and Public Affairs at DEA Headquarters in Arlington, Virginia.

In 2000, he was promoted to the Operations Division as Section Chief of the Dangerous Drugs and Chemicals Section where he oversaw a multi-jurisdictional investigation that resulted in the largest LSD seizure in history. In 2001, he was reassigned as the Deputy Chief in the Office of Domestic Operations. During that time, he served as Senior Advisor to the Chief of Domestic Operations, assisting in and providing oversight and direction for DEA's Domestic Operations' Section Chiefs on a variety of budgetary and operational matters.

In 2003 he left the Operations Division and began his service as the Assistant Special Agent-in-Charge for the Washington Field Division where he had responsibility over High Intensity Drug Trafficking Area Task Forces (HIDTA) in West Virginia, and in the administrative and special support units.

In 2004, he was appointed to the Senior Executive Service to serve as the Chief of Enforcement Operations. In this role, Mr. Harrigan was the principal deputy for the Chief of Operations and directed the re-organization of DEA's Operations Division.

== Chief of DEA's operations ==
In 2008 Special Agent Harrigan was appointed DEA's Chief of Operations. Among his many domestic and international drug enforcement responsibilities is the coordination of DEA's fight against the Mexico-based drug cartels and working with other governments to defeat them as their violence spreads. In May 2011 he testified before Congress where he said that the lessons learned from the rise in violence from fighting Mexico's drug cartels should be used to shape new efforts to fight the cartels' spread to Central America. "We must manage expectations, and accept that as (counternarcotics) efforts increased in Mexico, so too did violence," and that "DEA will work with our foreign partners to explore means of lessening the degree of any similar outcome in Central America," he continued. "We must recognize that, in such violence, we are witnessing acts of true desperation — the actions of wounded, vulnerable, and dangerous criminal organizations."

On February 18, 2011, Special Agent Harrigan was nominated by the President to serve as Deputy Administrator of the DEA. This nomination is pending confirmation by the United States Senate. Upon hearing of the nomination by President Obama, DEA Administrator Leonhart said, "His years of hands-on drug law enforcement experience in DEA operations around the world, and the proven leadership abilities he has shown will be tremendously important assets as together we continue our work of keeping the American people safe from dangerous drugs and those who traffic in them."

== Personal life ==
Harrigan, a native of New York City, has a master's degree in education from Seton Hall University and has attended a number of government, military, and private leadership courses including Duke University's Fuqua School of Business Leadership Program. Harrigan is married and has four children.
