= Kim Clarke Champniss =

Canadian television personality and musician

Kim Clarke Champniss is a Canadian television personality and musician, best known as a VJ for MuchMusic during the 1980s.

== Background ==
Kim was born in Bahrain and raised in London, England. He was a child actor in his youth, including appearances in the 1960 film Village of the Damned and a television commercial for Quaker Oats. He moved to Canada at age 19, briefly taking a job with the Hudson's Bay Company in Arviat before moving to Vancouver to study at the University of British Columbia. He became a DJ at the city's new wave club Luvafair in 1980, before becoming manager for local band Images in Vogue.

== Broadcasting career ==
He later joined MuchMusic as the host of a daily entertainment news show Rockflash and the alternative rock program City Limits. In addition, he produced music documentaries for the channel, including a tribute special to mark the tenth anniversary of Bob Marley's death, and became a cohost of The New Music in 1993. In this role, Marianne Faithfull, John Lydon and The Bee Gees all walked out of interviews with Champniss because they objected to his interview questions.

After leaving The New Music in 1996, Champniss moved into production roles with MuchMusic and its sister stations within the CHUM Limited media conglomerate, including as a contributing producer for Bravo! and as head of programming for MuchUSA.

In 1997, he released the album A Sound Mind, which was credited to KCC & Dancespeak. His collaborators on the album included Joe Vizvary of Images in Vogue and Dave Rout of Rational Youth and Digital Poodle.

== Post-Much career ==
He left CHUM in 2000 to form his own company, Invisible Republic, which provided music management for artists including Serial Joe and the revived The Grapes of Wrath.

In 2005, Champniss returned to an on-air role, hosting the series The Word This Week on BookTelevision and A-Channel. He has also appeared as a radio host on Toronto radio stations Edge 102 and Boom 97.3.

In 2013, he published the book The Republic of Rock ‘n’ Roll: The Roaring ’80s from Curtis to Cobain.

In 2018, he received a Canadian Screen Award nomination for Best Writing in a Lifestyle or Reality Show for his work on the Juno Awards of 2017.
