= 55 Degrees North =

2004-5 British TV crime series

- Also known as: The Night Detective
- Genre: Police procedural
- Created by: Timothy Prager
- Written by: Timothy Prager
- Directed by: Andy de Emmony; Brian Kelly; Roberto Bangura; Jon Sen; Pip Broughton; Susan Tully
- Starring: Don Gilet; Dervla Kirwan; Andrew Dunn; Emma Cleasby; Darren Morfitt; Christian Rodska; Mark Lewis Jones
- Theme music composer: Nick Green & Tristin Norwell
- Opening theme: "55 Degrees North" (Theme)
- Composers: Nick Green & Tristin Norwell
- Country of origin: United Kingdom
- Original language: English
- No. of series: 2
- No. of episodes: 14

Production
- Executive producers: Barbara McKissack; Adrian Bate
- Producers: Jo Wright; Jacinta Peel
- Production location: Newcastle upon Tyne
- Running time: 60 minutes
- Production companies: BBC, Zenith North

Original release
- Network: BBC One
- Release: 6 July 2004 – 10 July 2005

55 Degrees North is a BBC television drama series starring Don Gilet as DS Nicky Cole, a London detective relocated to Newcastle upon Tyne after exposing police corruption. Dervla Kirwan co-stars as Claire Maxwell, an ambitious solicitor.

The first series was originally broadcast on BBC1 in 2004, with the second series following a year later. The programme was shown in the U.S. under its working title, The Night Detective. But it was axed in 2006, and production company Zenith North entered administrative receivership shortly thereafter; the programme's cancellation was described as a "heavy blow" for the company. Both series were released together in a complete box set on 26 June 2006.

== Plot ==
Detective Sergeant Nicky Cole (Don Gilet) blows the whistle on a senior police officer guilty of corruption in London. Cole is then shunted up North to avoid any difficulties or fallout, and ends up in Newcastle upon Tyne as a Detective Sergeant in a busy CID with the fictional Tyneside Police. To begin with, he finds himself on the night shift and becomes increasingly frustrated at the insistence of his inspector, DI Carter (Christian Rodska) that he stays on nights despite the fact that his ability and motivation clearly exceed the demands of the job.

In the second series he becomes part of the day team and is a key member of the police squad that deals with, over the two series, a wide variety of crimes. Whilst developing his police career, Cole also finds time to help support the family he has brought to the North with him. His uncle, Errol Hill (George Harris), first-generation immigrant from Trinidad and Tobago, and nephew Matty (Jaeden Burke), are an integral part of Cole's life.

Cole's relationship with CPS lawyer, Claire Maxwell (Dervla Kirwan), provides another side to the story, as she is juggling work with caring for a baby, and Cole is caught between a rock and a hard place in choosing between her, or the attractive Sergeant, or one of Matty's school teachers. Another relationship developed is one between Cole and Sergeant Astel who, in the very first scene, smashes Cole's brake light after stopping him and not realising his status as a police officer. This awkward start turns into a strange but strong friendship by the end.

55 Degrees North is a police drama at heart, but covers many different aspects of life, including love and relationships and the importance of family. It also touches on such issues as racism and police corruption. Many crimes committed are pertinent to the age, and complex issues such as genetic engineering are tackled.

== Tyneside Police ==
The exterior of the police station used in the programme is actually the base of HMS Calliope, a Royal Navy Reserve training centre for the North and North East. This building is located on the Gateshead bank of the River Tyne next to the Baltic Centre for Contemporary Art and the Gateshead Millennium Bridge.

The name given for the police force in the series was Tyneside Police; with a logo similar to that of the defunct Tyne and Wear County Council and uniforms with slightly altered badge labels borrowed from Northumbria Police, the real police force which covers the Newcastle upon Tyne area.

== Cast ==
All characters had a major role in the series.

Character	Actor	Years	Series	Episode count
DS Dominic 'Nicky' Cole	Don Gilet	2004–2005	1.1–2.8	14
CPS Claire Maxwell	Dervla Kirwan	2004–2005	1.1–2.8	14
Sgt. Rick Astel	Andrew Dunn	2004–2005	1.1–2.8	14
PC Martin Clark	Mark Stobbart	2004–2005	1.1–2.8	14
Sgt. Katherine Brookes	Emma Cleasby	2004–2005	1.1–2.8	14
DS Frank Maguire	Michael Hodgson	2004–2005	1.1–2.8	14
DS Patrick Yates	Darren Morfitt	2004–2005	1.1–2.8	14
Matty Cole	Jaeden Burke	2004–2005	1.1–2.8	14
Errol Hill	George Harris	2004–2005	1.1–2.8	14
DI Dennis Carter	Christian Rodska	2004	1.1–1.6	6
DI Russell Bing	Mark Lewis Jones	2005	2.2–2.8	7

== Episode list ==
=== Series 1 (2004) ===
The first series sees Cole work on the night shift, and thus, the majority of the scenes are filmed in the dark. This creates an air of suspicion and tension, and this is clear as Cole is unsure who he can trust. His two main co-workers are reluctant to forge a relationship with him, and his immediate commanding officer seems distant, harsh, and somewhat afraid that Cole may blow the whistle on his career if he steps at all out of line. The first series aired from 6 July to 10 August 2004. Christian Rodska (DI Carter) left the show at the end of this series.

No. overall	No. in season	Title	Directed by	Written by	Original release date	Viewers (millions)
1	1	"Between a Rock and a Hard Place"	Andy De Emmony	Timothy Prager	6 July 2004	5.19
DS Cole (Don Gilet) finds himself still stuck on the night shift a month after his initial transfer. However, he soon discovers that the night can be just as exciting as the day. Following the death of a key witness in a major extortion case, Cole goes in pursuit of the only remaining witness who can testify at the trial. The problem is, he has been intimidated by a violent gang and has gone into hiding. After finally tracking him down, Cole is forced to protect the man's parents after their house is firebombed. The case takes a further twist when a ransom note is slipped under his cell door back at the nick. And that's not all Cole has to deal with - the shift also sees him having to deal with a Jane Doe pulled out of the river, and a domestic involving a squabbling husband and wife.
2	2	"Payback"	Andy De Emmony	Timothy Prager	13 July 2004	4.86
DI Carter (Christian Rodska) isn't too happy when the CPS declare that their attempt to bring down the owner of a brothel as corrupt due to the undercover officer offering paid incentives for 'extras'. In a second attempt at catching the slippery villains, Carter sends Cole undercover, but his attempt to make his excuses and leave backfires badly. Meanwhile, Cole is also investigating a violent burglary - but during a search of the property he discovers the occupants may also be a part of the brothel ring which he is trying to close down. After managing to get one of the toms on-side, he arranges a setup to catch the owner and his gang at the property. Meanwhile, Uncle Errol finds an ally of his own when he defends a friendly female neighbour from her drunken boyfriend.
3	3	"Happy Ending"	Brian Kelly	Timothy Prager	20 July 2004	5.80
DS Cole is determined to find a name for his Jane Doe, and it's not long before a missing persons report throws up a vital lead. Meanwhile, a lack of interest from the dayshift leaves Cole the task of investigating when a shopkeeper's efforts to punish a young shoplifter backfire. However, mitigating circumstances surrounding the case leave Cole to suspect that the charges should be against the claimant, rather than the victim. Meanwhile, a father's personal protest over access rights to his children causes traffic problems in Tyneside city centre, but Cole has an ingenious way to get the situation back on track. As the violent unrest against the shopkeeper spills over onto the day shift, Errol and Georgina continue to bond over a round of golf.
4	4	"A Question of Timing"	Brian Kelly	Timothy Prager	28 July 2004	5.51
Cole finds himself investigating the brutal assault of a man and wife by a fellow motorist, but is angered when he manages to track down the prime suspect, only for Maguire to negotiate his release in order to keep up surveillance on a major drugs ring. Meanwhile, Cole is approached and offered money as a bribe for information. He declines, and hands a statement in to Claire in the event that someone spills the beans, feeling that he cannot trust to give the statement to Carter. Meanwhile, after a drunken night out, Sergeant Astel discovers he's hit something - or someone - with his car. As he enlists Cole's help to retrace his steps, a routine check of some youths hanging around a phone box lead to him and Clark being the subject of an explosion.
5	5	"No Loyalty"	Roberto Bangura	Timothy Prager	3 August 2004	6.05
Cole, who has come under investigation for corruption, discovers the person who reported him is the only one who can help clear his name. Meanwhile, a care worker has been found dead in a residential home. Upon assessing the crime scene, the body of a second victim, an elderly resident, is found, but an anxious Yates, who has heard on the grapevine that Cole is being investigated, refuses to let him anywhere near the case. As he finally manages to work out how the attack was committed and who was responsible, he discovers that Carter is on-side after all when he manages to shield him from any further investigation. Meanwhile, Cole finds himself in a difficult situation when a pregnant Claire decides to make a move on him, which leaves him dazed and confused.
6	6	"Officer Down"	Roberto Bangura	Timothy Prager	10 August 2004	6.36
Cole is confronted by Carter, who apologises for the lack of trust shown towards him. He confides in him by claiming that someone on the squad is bent, and he wants him to find out who. Meanwhile, a young girl is found naked in the street, and Cole discovers she has been the latest victim of a serial date rapist. As Cole and company head undercover in a local nightclub in an attempt to catch him, Maguire and Yates are setting up a meet where guns used in several armed jewellery robberies are due to be handed over. They have asked Cole to meet the informant, but tied up with the nightclub op, Carter decides to step in instead. However, the meeting goes horribly wrong and Carter is shot, leaving Cole to realise that he suffered a lucky escape.

=== Series 2 (2005) ===
The second series sees Cole make it on to the day shift, and the introduction of Detective Inspector Bing (Mark Lewis Jones). His character is honest, open and amusing, and signals a stark contrast between the two series. He creates a more positive impression, and allows the show to move in a different direction. The series aired from 22 May to 10 July 2005.

No. overall	No. in season	Title	Directed by	Written by	Original release date	Viewers (millions)
7	1	"Holy Day of Obligation"	Jen Sen	Timothy Prager	22 May 2005	4.47
Cole investigates an intimidation campaign against a local research group, but is dragged off the case when the body of a young man is found in the city centre with a broken neck. Yates, now acting DI, is convinced the motive for the attack is robbery, but when Cole discovers the man worked as a cleaner for the research group, he follows his own theory that the man is the next victim of the intimidaters, until he realises that a number of marks on the body which he initially suspected to be cigarette burns are actually marks from a stiletto shoe, and he discovers the real motive for the attack. Meanwhile, Claire finds herself in court leading a case into a market trader who has been abusing trading standards rules by selling his fruit and veg in metric amounts.
8	2	"Make Me a Hero"	Jen Sen	Timothy Prager	29 May 2005	3.69
Cole and Maguire are eager to find out whether Yates has been handed the DI's job permanently, but during the official announcement, are called away to the scene of an armed robbery at a building society, where they encounter a rather comic Welshman who turns out to be the new Inspector. As Bing (Mark Lewis Jones) gets to grips with his team, Cole discovers that the female victim of the robbery may have been playing along as part of a scam, and it's not long before he is able to locate and identify her from a set of fingerprints at the scene. Yates is downcast at being set aside as blue eyed Cole is moved onto the day shift to help with the investigation. However, an obbo to catch the perpetrators goes wrong when Yates fails to pinpoint the correct location.
9	3	"A Firm Hand"	Pip Broughton	Timothy Prager	5 June 2005	4.25
Cole and the team investigate the death of a man who owed money to two violent loan sharks, but after being assaulted twice in the same day, the case falls down to during which attack the fatal blow was dealt - a difficult task which leaves both suspects open to being released without charge. Meanwhile, Astel and Clarke deal with a persistent man who is repeatedly pulling down a mobile phone mast on his council block. When a mob assembles to prevent the officers from reaching the man before he strikes again, Brookes is injured and Bing loses his cool with the suspect. Meanwhile, Astel decides to sign up for singing lessons after entering himself in the local 'Cop Idol' competition, but soon finds himself in an unexpected romance with his singing teacher.
10	4	"Vague Allegations"	Pip Broughton	Timothy Prager	12 June 2005	4.89
Cole investigates when a group of local residents make a complaint about a group of travelers who have pitched up on a local beauty spot. However, when it is discovered the travelers actually own the land and have a legal right to set up camp, the locals are not best pleased. Meanwhile, Claire is selling her flat, but a row with her mother leaves her in an awkward position. As her mother prepares to leave home, a mysterious package is found in her car, reading "You Will Die". As one of the locals also finds himself as the victim of a campaign of harassment, Cole places Claire under 24-hour-watch in an attempt to catch the perpetrator. Meanwhile, Astel gears himself up for his Cop Idol performance, but finds himself distracted by the new woman in his life.
11	5	"Girl in the Castle"	Roberto Bangura	Timothy Prager	19 June 2005	5.23
Cole takes the family to Lindisfarne for a peaceful weekend break, but unexpectedly finds himself playing detective when Errol is arrested on suspicion of the murder of a local young girl, who is found dead on the causeway. Cole and Maguire attempt to prove Errol's alibi that he was in church at the time of the murder, but soon find themselves in the cells after being arrested by the local DI for interfering in the investigation. Meanwhile, Yates is leading the investigation into an armed robbery, and is pleased when he manages to catch one of the prime suspects as well as recover a haul of stolen goods. However, both Bing and Maxwell are unexpectedly suspicious when Yates changes his statement, claiming that he did not see the suspect leaving the premises.
12	6	"Some Sort of Vigilante"	Roberto Bangura	Timothy Prager	26 June 2005	3.67
Cole and Brookes investigate a campaign of harassment against the residents of a sea-view block of flats. Firstly, a group of 150 rats are placed in the basement of the property, which subsequently causes problems with the building's electric supply, before two young students residing in the property are badly beaten on their own front doorstep. Meanwhile, Astel and Clarke arrest a shoplifter calling himself 'George Bush' after he is cornered by a community support officer. However, with no record of any CSOs being assigned to the area, and no notes on the alleged incident on the police log, it's not long before the team realise that an impostor has been posing as a CSO. However, when the sea-view block of flats goes up in flames, it's the fake CSO who manages to get everyone to safety.
13	7	"Nothing You Want to Be (Part 1)"	Susan Tully	Timothy Prager	3 July 2005	3.57
Yates investigates when pensioner Fred Beacham is attacked and robbed in his own home. However, with the attack having been carried out by Jack Dungary and his mob, who have Yates in their back pocket, Yates is forced to cover their tracks by fitting up a local youth with previous convictions for similar offences. Obtaining DNA from the youth and placing it at the scene, Yates believes he created the perfect alibi for Dungary, but Cole, Maguire and Bing are all suspicious of his motives. A young woman approaches Claire claiming that her husband's conviction for the death of their baby is unsafe, and has new information which could prove his innocence. Meanwhile, Cole's brother, Adam, is released from prison and is desperate to see his son, Matty.
14	8	"Ashes to Ashes (Part 2)"	Susan Tully	Timothy Prager	10 July 2005	3.35
Cole is tasked with keeping Yates under surveillance, and it's not long before he arranges another meet with crime boss Dungary. Realising he has to keep Yates on side, Bing tries to win his confidence in an attempt to fool Yates into slipping up. Meanwhile, the body of another member of the Beacham family is found hanging from a crane, and now, there is no doubt that the rivalry between the two families is the cause of all of the recent unrest. As Yates reveals the source of the rivalry to be £50,000 of stolen bank notes, Bing arranges an obbo to catch Dungary retrieving the money from a safe hiding place. However, Yates calls Cole away from the operation to a secret meeting in a railway tunnel, only for Cole to walk into a firefight. Will either of them make it out alive?
