= Harrigan (film) =

- Film poster
- Directed by: Vince Woods
- Written by: Arthur McKenzie
- Produced by: Kirsty Bell; Robbie Elliott; Paul R. Rogers; Stephen Tompkinson; Mary Woods
- Starring: Stephen Tompkinson; Gillian Kearney; Maurice Roëves; Mark Stobbart; Darren Morfitt; Bill Fellows; Jamie Cho; Amy Manson; Craig Conway; Ronnie Fox
- Cinematography: James McAleer
- Edited by: Michael Pentney
- Music by: James Edward Barker
- Production company: TallTree Pictures
- Distributed by: High Fliers Films
- Release date: 20 August 2013
- Running time: 94 minutes
- Country: United Kingdom
- Language: English

Harrigan (also known as Detective Harrigan) is a British crime drama film, written by Arthur McKenzie and directed by Vince Woods, that premiered on 20 August 2013. Set in 1974, the film stars Stephen Tompkinson as DS Barry Harrigan, a no-nonsense copper driven by the sudden death of his wife and daughter at the hands of a vicious local thug.

Harrigan was released on DVD on 13 January 2014.

== Plot ==
After returning from secondment to Hong Kong, DS Barry Harrigan (Stephen Tompkinson) finds that an old adversary, Dunstan (Craig Conway), a local gang leader who was responsible for the death of his wife and daughter in an arson attack, is targeting a young mother, Vickey Frizell (Amy Manson) and her two children.

After managing to help Vickey out of trouble, Harrigan makes it his personal mission to clean up Newcastle's most notorious estate, the Monkshire, by reopening the former police section house in a bid to rid the city of Dunstan and his associates once and for all.

== Cast ==
- Stephen Tompkinson as DS Barry Harrigan
- Gillian Kearney as DS Bridie Wheland
- Maurice Roëves as Billy Davidson
- Mark Stobbart as DI Larson
- Darren Morfitt as DC Swift
- Bill Fellows as DS Colin Moss
- Jamie Cho as PC Lau
- Amy Manson as Vickey Frizell
- Craig Conway as Dunstan
- Ronnie Fox as Cole
- Steven Hillman as Stringer
- Ian Whyte as Ronnie
- John Bowler as Vince Jenkins
- Shaun Prendergast as Ch. Supt. Atkins
- Mike Elliot as DC Alan Trimble
- Dan Styles as Scott
- Val McLane as Lily
- Niek Versteeg as Gary Cole

== Production ==
Harrigan was filmed on location in Gateshead, Newcastle and Hartlepool during January and February 2012, and was originally intended to be the pilot for a potentially ongoing television series. The character of Harrigan was based upon writer Arthur McKenzie, who served as a policeman in Newcastle during the 1960s and 1970s.

== Reception ==
Harrigan holds a 14% approval rating on Rotten Tomatoes, on the basis of seven reviews with an average score of 4/10. Notably, the Daily Express commented that "there are few surprises in this cliché-ridden plucky effort that may have been better as a television production."
