= CTV Life Channel =

Canadian pay television channel

- Country: Canada
- Broadcast area: Nationwide
- Headquarters: 299 Queen Street West, Toronto, Ontario

Ownership
- Owner: CHUM Limited (1998–2007); CTVglobemedia (CTV Limited) (2007–2011); BCE Inc. (2011–present)
- Parent: Bell Media (branding licensed from Knight Enterprises from 2016 to 2019)
- Sister channels: CTV; CTV Comedy Channel; CTV Drama Channel; CTV Nature Channel; CTV News Channel; CTV Sci-Fi Channel; CTV Speed Channel; Oxygen; USA Network

History
- Launched: October 5, 1998, 26 years ago
- Former names: MuchMoreMusic (1998–2009); MuchMore (2009–2013); M3 (2013–2016); Gusto (2016–2019)

Links
- Website: ctv.ca/life

CTV Life Channel is a Canadian English language discretionary specialty channel owned by BCE Inc. through its Bell Media subsidiary. The channel primarily broadcasts factual and reality programming on lifestyle topics such as cooking, home improvement and real estate, along with scripted drama series.

The channel was established in 1998 as MuchMoreMusic, a spin-off of the youth-oriented MuchMusic, by its owner CHUM Limited, the owner of Citytv, targeting an older demographic with adult contemporary and classic music videos, along with music news programs, concert specials, and pop culture programming (usually sourced from the U.S. network VH1, which shared a similar positioning). Under Bell ownership, and following the lead of its parent network, the channel adopted a general entertainment format and began to heavily downplay music programming outside non-peak hours (similar to Much at the time). On September 1, 2016, M3 was relaunched as the new version of Gusto, acquired from Knight Enterprises.

As part of a rebranding of several Bell Media-owned specialty channels, the channel rebranded as CTV Life Channel on September 12, 2019.

Like all analogue channels prior to 2001, CTV Life Channel was required to be carried on the basic service of all digital cable providers across Canada. Due to its former status of a Category A service, this channel was, and still is, typically offered optionally at the discretion of providers.

== History ==
=== As MuchMoreMusic ===
In June 1993, the Canadian Radio-television and Telecommunications Commission (CRTC) began accepting licence applications for new Canadian specialty channels for the first time since 1987. On August 31, 1993, MuchMusic and CITY-TV co-founder Moses Znaimer announced on-air a proposal by CHUM Limited to launch a specialty channel called MuchMoreMusic as an adult music/lifestyle channel, quoted as offering music more "familiar, tuneful, [and] melodic" for an audience who "could do with a little less rock and rap and metal". This followed CHUM's earlier application for a country music channel, MuchCountry. "Melodic pop, soft rock, jazz, soul and blues" were to be some of the genres played by MuchMoreMusic; according to CHUM, the new channel would be able to provide such music to the "sizable" portion of its existing audience who enjoyed such softer music but could not find it reliably on MuchMusic.

Logo as MuchMoreMusic, used from October 5, 1998 to March 31, 2009. An early version exists where "music" is in a slightly different font.

At a subsequent February 1994 public hearing, the CRTC reviewed a total of seven applications for music channels, comprising five country music channels, MuchMoreMusic, and CHUM's MusiquExtra, which was to be a French-language adult contemporary counterpart. In a Canadian Press article, commissioner Adrian Burns noted concerns with giving one operator control of multiple music channels; Znaimer, meanwhile, claimed that there was no room for more than one operator of music channels in Canada. In June, the MuchMoreMusic application was denied by the Commission, as well as the MuchCountry and MusiquExtra proposals; out of the seven, the only application approved was Maclean-Hunter and Rawlco Communications' The Country Network (which launched as New Country Network, and later became CMT). Subsequently, the CRTC was criticized for passing only 10 of the 48 total applications.

In January 1996, the next round of licensing began, drawing another 44 applications; CHUM submitted nine of these, including MuchMoreMusic and the French-language adult contemporary channel, now called MusiMax (formerly MusicMax). The new application, delivered by MuchMusic programmer Denise Donlon on May 8, 1996, incorporated video testimonials by a number of Canadian musicians, including Anne Murray, Bruce Cockburn, Burton Cummings, Celine Dion, David Foster, Lawrence Gowan, Dan Hill and Marc Jordan, attesting to the need for the channel; Donlon conceded, in a Canadian Press article, that a number of Canadian musicians were no longer filming music videos because MuchMusic was not able to accommodate every music genre equally. On the same day, CHUM also made pitches for Canadian Learning Television and Computer Access, a later rejected computer education channel.

MuchMoreMusic was licensed by the CRTC in 1996 (as well as some of CHUM's other proposals rejected in 1994, including CablePulse24, Space, and Musimax); the channel was launched on October 5, 1998 under the ownership of CHUM Limited.

Logo as MuchMore, used from March 31, 2009 to September 30, 2013

In January 1999, Globe and Mail critic John Doyle commented on the channel's invariant hosting at the time, remarking that it "appears to be staffed by one person only, Jana Lynne White. The woman does everything — interviews, running down the appalling video chart, promos, everything except come to your house and turn on the TV for you." The channel's early lineup also included the MuchMusic program ClipTrip, which was moved to MuchMoreMusic, along with its host Diego Fuentes, the winner of MuchMusic's 1995 VJ search.

From September 1999 to January 2000, the MuchMoreMusic audience in the 18 to 49 age demographic increased 43% over the same period a year earlier.

In April 2000, Bill Welychka also transferred from MuchMusic, to host Freshly Pressed and later The Loop. In April 2000, full-time staff and programming was expanded, including daytime "information segments". Studio space, at 299 Queen Street West, was shared with MuchMusic until May 2000, when it was moved to the fourth floor of the building. In September 2003, MuchMoreMusic launched a sister digital network, MuchMoreRetro, which focuses exclusively on classic music videos.

=== Bell ownership ===
In July 2006, Bell Globemedia (later called CTVglobemedia) announced that it would purchase CHUM for an estimated CA$1.7 billion, including MuchMoreMusic. The sale was subject to CRTC approval and was approved in June 2007, with the transaction completed on June 22, 2007, while the Citytv stations were sold to Rogers Media in the same year.

On March 31, 2009, MuchMoreMusic was relaunched with a new on-air format and subsequently was renamed MuchMore. The changeover took effect at 6:00 a.m. Eastern Time, with the first edition of the newly branded morning video flow series Juiced! Ownership changed hands once again when Bell Canada gained 100% control of CTVglobemedia's assets, including MuchMore, resulting in MuchMore being taken over by Bell Media on April 1, 2011.

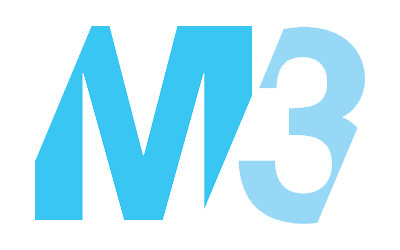
Logo used as M3, used from September 30, 2013 to September 1, 2016.

On September 19, 2013, Bell announced that MuchMore would be relaunched as M3 on September 30, shifting towards an entertainment-oriented "superstation" format with a focus on newly-acquired dramas and comedies alongside music programming. Unlike MuchMore, which was marketed as a spin-off of MuchMusic, M3 was marketed as a separate brand to quell concerns over viewers incorrectly suggesting that the network was catered towards a youth demographic due to its similar name. A high definition feed was also launched.

After the relaunch, MuchMoreRetro was rebranded as MuchRetro, aligning the channel with the Much brand. The MuchMore Countdown became the M3 Countdown and was relaunched with a new format on January 18, 2014. It was the last remaining original music-related program on the network. Juiced was cancelled following the rebrand and M3Top20.ca (formerly known as MMMTop20.ca and, later, MMTop20.ca), a viewer-voted countdown show, was removed from the schedule in the spring of 2014.

On September 7, 2014, M3 debuted a new countdown show called the Retro 30. Replacing the M3 Countdown, Retro 30 focuses on "the biggest news, events and artists of a specific day of a year". Following its introduction, the network began adding more retro videos into its rotation. In January 2015, M3 debuted a new country music block: the M3 Country Brunch. Retro 30 was cancelled in 2015 and the Country Brunch block was later removed from the schedule.

=== As Gusto ===
Gusto logo used from 2016 to 2019; later enclosed within a rectangle.

On May 4, 2016, Knight Enterprises announced that it had sold Canadian rights to the Gusto TV brand to Bell Media and that the current channel would be shut down and replaced by a new version of the service under Bell Media ownership. The brand's parent company, Gusto Worldwide Media (GWM), had licensed Gusto TV's current programming to Bell in addition to producing future series for the channel as GWM continued to own international rights to the Gusto brand and announced plans to launch an internet television service under the brand in 2017. M3 was re-launched on September 1, 2016 as Gusto under its existing Category A license and channel allotments.

=== As CTV Life Channel ===
On June 7, 2018, during the CTV upfronts, it was announced that Gusto would be re-branded as "CTV Life", as part of a re-branding of several Bell Media specialty channels under the CTV name. The following year, it was revealed the channel would rebrand as CTV Life Channel on September 12, 2019. Bell also announced an output deal with Mike Holmes and his studio, under which CTV Life Channel would air his future productions (such as the new series Holmes 911), and acquire reruns of his past series (such as Holmes on Homes).

== Programming ==
Programming on CTV Life Channel consists of cooking, home improvement and real estate, along with scripted drama series. As M3, it consisted of dramas, sitcoms, reality shows, and theatrically-released films. M3 often carried same-week encores of programming aired on CTV and CTV Two, as well as off-network repeats of shows that aired on other Bell Media-owned channels.

Music videos were broadcast from 6:00 a.m to 3:00 p.m. ET on weekdays, and 6:00 a.m to 10:00 a.m. ET on weekends. Originally, the channel's music content was aligned towards lighter genres of music than MuchMusic, including adult contemporary and classic hits. Under the MuchMore branding, the channel began airing a more hotter, pop-driven rotation of videos.

As noted before, M3 was marketed as a "superstation" and a separate channel from Much. Though both channels had diverged from their original purpose, Much still retained its music-based format while expanding to focus on pop culture and adopting more younger-skewing programming (The music-based format has since been removed, as Much eventually changed its demographic to male).
