= James Dale (musician) =

British musician, songwriter and entrepreneur

James Dale (born 25 September 1982) is an English singer, songwriter, record producer and entrepreneur, best known as the frontman for Goldheart Assembly.

== Biography ==
Dale originally ran live music nights at The Rock Garden in London's Covent Garden with magician and television personality Pete Heat before founding Goldheart Assembly with John Herbert in 2007.

In 2009 Goldheart Assembly became the first unsigned band to record a BBC Radio 1 Maida Vale Session in over a decade, gaining DJ Steve Lamacq as a lifelong fan and champion. In the same year, the band performed on the BBC Introducing Stage at the Glastonbury Festival, as well as slots at the Camden Crawl, Isle of Wight, Wychwood, Middlesbrough Music Live, Reading & Leeds and V Festival.

Dale co-wrote and co-produced Goldheart Assembly's debut album Wolves and Thieves, which went on to receive universal acclaim from the music and UK national press, with positive reviews in publications including Mojo, Uncut and NME magazines as well as The Sun and The Independent newspapers.

In October 2011, he appeared on Last Call with Carson Daly with Goldheart Assembly performing four songs from their debut album.

Dale also co-wrote and co-produced the band's second album, Long Distance Song Effects. The album also received widespread critical acclaim with publications such as The Guardian, Metro, Allmusic and NME all awarding the album 4-star reviews.

In 2013 he signed to Faber Music as a songwriter.

Dale has run events and live music nights at the legendary private members club the Groucho Club in Soho since 2015.

In December 2017, the band announced that they would play their final show in London. Goldheart Assembly's Last Waltz was on 7 December 2017 at ULU. The band were joined on stage by members of The Magic Numbers, Starsailor, EMF, The Bluetones, Treetop Flyers, Lyla Foy and Ren Harvieu.

In 2017 it was announced that Dale was heading up a new record label, LGM Records, with former EMF bandleader and hit songwriter Ian Dench, where the two developed and signed indie pop band Friedberg, as well as Jo Goes Hunting, Mono Club and Amaroun. The label was featured in The Times and Dale was invited to talk on BBC World News and on BBC Radio 4's flagship news programme Today.

In 2018 Dale co-founded SINE Digital where he is the managing director. The company specialise in digital advertising. He has worked on hit West End productions such as 2:22: A Ghost Story and Back to the Future: The Musical and has run digital campaigns for theatre producers such as Cameron Mackintosh, Colin Ingram, Sonia Friedman and Playful Productions.

Dale gave the reasons for pivoting from music to running a digital agency in an interview to Performance Marketing World:

I’m not blaming big corporations and record labels for our lack of long-term success as with any artistic endeavour it's a combination of multiple factors. However, not having the ability to contact people that had been listening to us online from day one – combined with never having access to the first-party data of people that had bought our physical products and had paid to see us live across the country – meant that it was impossible for us to be self-sufficient. This was the main driver for starting SINE Digital in 2017 – I wanted to try to make sure that the same thing didn't happen to artists that we worked with.

In January 2023, it was announced in publications such as The Stage that Dale would become the CEO of a group of companies to be called SINE Group, a move that would involve expanding their services to Broadway.
