= James Mullinger =

English comedian based in New Brunswick, Canada

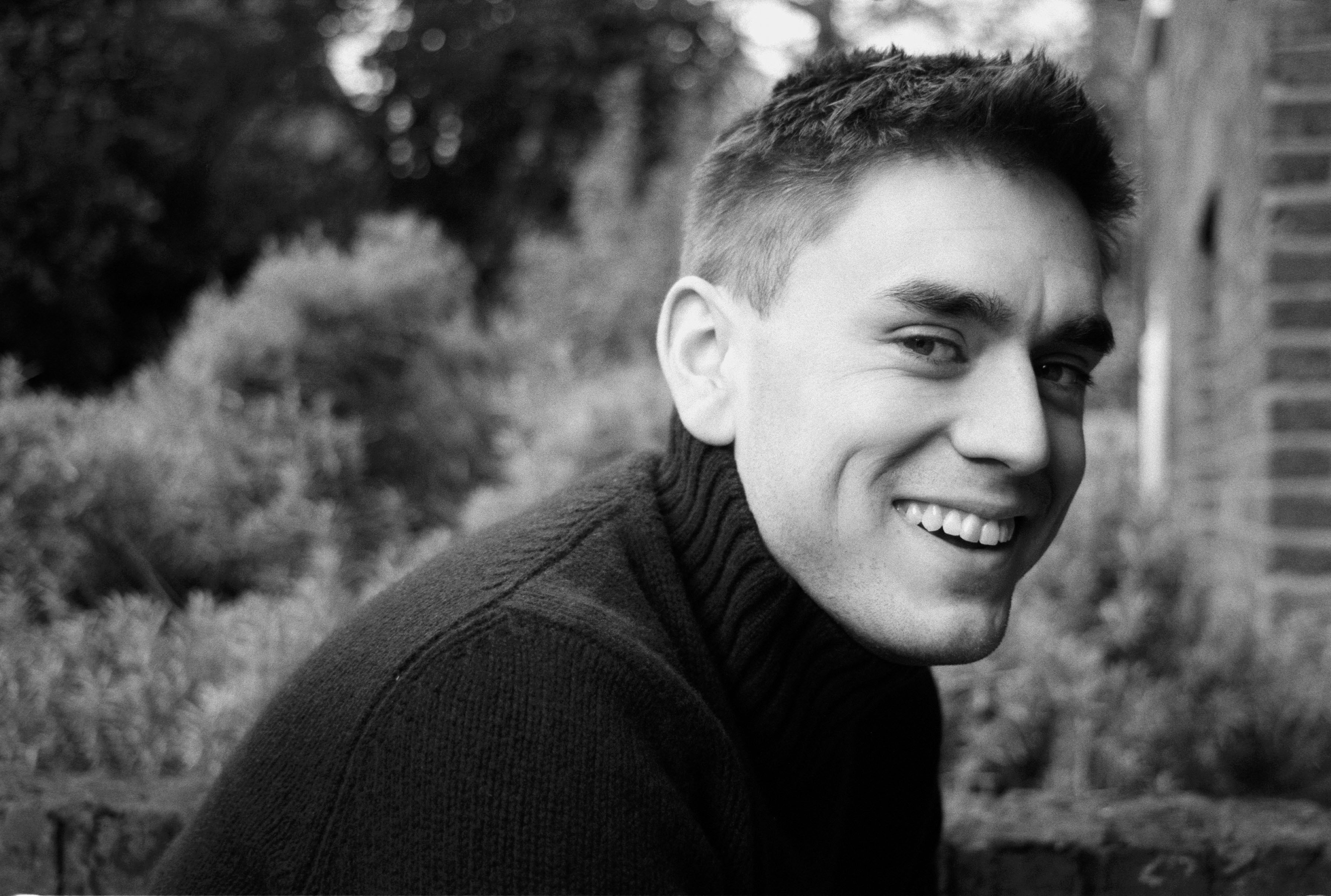
- Born: 11 March 1978 (age 47); Berkshire, England, UK
- Occupation: Comedian
- Years active: 2005–present
- Website: www.jamesmullinger.com

James Mullinger (born 11 March 1978) is an English-Canadian alternative comedian based in New Brunswick. Though primarily a stand-up comic, Mullinger has held a number of roles in other media including a presenter of Blimey! An Englishman in Atlantic Canada, co-writer and co-producer of The Comedian's Guide to Survival, and actor in the upcoming NBrexit. In 2022, he published his memoir, Brit Happens: Or Living the Canadian Dream, with Goose Lane Editions. In 2016, Mullinger broke Jerry Seinfeld's record ticket sales at Harbour Station and outsold performances including Guns N' Roses, Iron Maiden, and Snoop Dogg.

== Early life ==
Mullinger grew up in Maidenhead, Berkshire. He studied English Literature and Women's Studies at Kingston University. Mullinger grew up seeing shows at Norden Farm and has since performed there. As a teenager, his favourite comedians included Ben Elton, Frank Skinner, Steve Martin, and Monty Python.

== Career ==
Mullinger began performing stand-up comedy in 2005. The same year, he reached the finals of Jimmy Carr's Comedy Idol, You Must Be Joking at the Newbury Comedy Festival, and Your Comedy Stars at the Edinburgh Fringe. He also started the Upstairs at the Masons comedy club in the function room of Mayfair's Masons Arms pub which, in addition to bringing in local comedians, attracted comedians such as Russell Brand, Richard Herring, Greg Davies, and Michael McIntyre. His debut show in 2009, The Bad Boy of Feminism, sold out at the Camden Fringe. Since then, he has performed a number of shows—James Mullinger's Schooldays, The Man With No Shame (2012/2013), Living the Canadian Dream (2014/2015), and Anything is Possible—across both Canada and the UK. The Man With No Shame was centred around readings from his teenage diaries.

Between November 2011 and January 2012, Mullinger hosted Movie Kingdom, a web series co-created with friend and collaborator Mark Murphy. The pair reviewed movies and interviewed celebrities. It was later developed as a Comedy Central web series titled A Moment With, which featured actors including Anne Hathaway, Andrew Garfield, and Javier Bardem and comedians Jackie Mason, Ross Noble, and Stewart Lee. In 2016, he and Murphy collaborated on The Comedian's Guide to Survival, a film based on and dramatising Mullinger's experiences as a comedian. The Inbetweeners star James Buckley portrayed the fictionalised version of Mullinger.

The same year, he worked with Hemmings House on City on Fire, a documentary showing Mullinger getting ready for his first sold-out show at Harbour Station and exploring his love of New Brunswick. He also finished shooting the first season of Comedy Bootcamp on Bell Aliant TV1 in 2016. In 2022, Mullinger published his memoir Brit Happens: Or Living the Canadian Dream with Goose Lane Editions. NBrexit, his next major venture, is a sitcom about a comedian forced to move to Canada (whereas Mullinger made the choice) to escape a Brexit scandal. It was filmed in Miramichi and claims to be the first English-speaking sitcom filmed and set entirely in New Brunswick. Mullinger also made an effort to employ people living in New Brunswick. It is scheduled to air in March 2023.

Mullinger worked at GQ 2000-2014, starting during a two-week work experience after university. He was a journalist, comedy editor, and photo editor, and interviewed celebrities such as Daniel Craig, Tom Cruise, and George Clooney. In 2012, he was at the centre of controversy when he airbrushed Kate Winslet to look thinner and have longer legs. While the pushback was difficult, he said that the argument was valid and that he "was just an idiot" and that it was a "big mistake" rather than an intentional act of misogyny.

Mullinger has appeared on Street-Cred Sudoku alongside Robin Ince, Sue Perkins and Rufus Hound. In Canada, he toured the country for Blimey! An Englishman in Atlantic Canada and Atlantic Edition and played villain Mr. Green in the children's show Ug Wug. Mullinger is also editor-in-chief of Maritime [EDIT], a quarterly publication centred on Atlantic Canada, and co-hosts Field & Mullinger's Underground Nights with Paul Field. He has been nominated for a Just for Laughs Comedy Award and a Canadian Comedy Award for Best Live Show. Mullinger credits a comedy course taught by Logan Murray and Hils Jago for helping him garner the confidence needed to perform standup.

== Personal life ==
Mullinger and his Canadian-born wife, Pam, moved to Saint John, New Brunswick from London in 2014. His wife worked with Vanity Fair and Wallpaper* while in London and as of 2022 was a marketing consultant and advertising director for several magazines, including Kinfolk. The couple have two sons, Hunter and River, who play Mullinger's children in his show NBrexit. Mullinger is a self-proclaimed feminist and has performed to benefit women's charities. On November 9, 2021, he became a Canadian citizen. As of 2022, Mullinger lives in the town of Rothesay.
