= NextUp Comedy =

British Media Company

- Website type: OTT streaming platform
- Available in: English
- Founded: November 2016; 9 years ago
- Area served: Worldwide
- Founders: Daniel Berg; Sarah Henley; Kenny Cavey
- Industry: Technology & Entertainment industry, mass media
- Products: Streaming media; Livestreaming media; Video on demand
- Services: Film production; Film distribution
- Website: nextupcomedy.com

NextUp Comedy Ltd is a UK video-on-demand and streaming service, specialising in stand-up comedy shows. Founded in November 2016 by Daniel Berg, Sarah Henley and Kenny Cavey, the platform provides users access to a 200+ library of on-demand comedy specials and short sets and weekly livestreams direct from comedy clubs and festivals. Comedians with shows on the platform are supported through a 50/50 revenue share model and NextUp provides rehearsal space for comedians in its London office.

The platform consists of 60 minute comedy 'specials' which are full length shows available on demand. NextUp also hosts a variety of 'shorts' which are 10 minute clips aimed at giving viewers a taste for the comedian and their show. NextUp Comedy live streams comedy shows happening across the UK from local venues to festivals such as the Edinburgh Fringe straight to the viewer's devices at home. They also scout the circuit to serve their subscribers the best shows, with new and exclusive releases every quarter. NextUp Comedy also reflect the variety of the comedy scene better than any other platform with observational stand-up alongside character comedians, musical comedy, sketch groups, and alternative acts.

Subscribers can watch worldwide instantly on the web on their website or via their apps on Apple Inc. and Android smartphones and tablets, Samsung and LG smart TVs, Amazon Fire TV and Apple TV. NextUp shows can also cast with AirPlay and Chromecast, whilst on their iOS and Android app subscribers can download shows to watch offline.

NextUp Comedy is headquartered in London, England and not only features shows happening in the greater London area, but stand-up gigs happening all over the United Kingdom.

== History ==
NextUp was founded in the UK in November 2016 by Daniel Berg, Sarah Henley and Kenny Cavey, the owners of YouTube channel and live comedy night ComComedy. Their co-Founder is Stuart Snaith, formerly of BBC Worldwide. Bil Bungay from venture capitalist firm Velocity is among their board members.

In 2017 the company secured £230,000 (US$297,000) in its latest investment round, and signed deals with both Amazon Channels and Virgin Atlantic to broadcast their specials on the airline's in-flight entertainment. In 2021, they joined Samsung's Smart Start platform and provided new Samsung Smart TV customers the unique opportunity to access premium apps and entertainment during the initial months of purchase. This partnership let viewers discover exclusive sets from both famous acts and rising stars such as Ed Byrne, Miles Jupp and Maisie Adam – all without leaving their sofa.

Beginning January 2023, select NextUp Comedy shows are also available on ITVX including Anna Mann, Jason Byrne, Lost Voice Guy, and many more.

== Features and access ==
=== Subscription and platform features ===
The company's primary business is its subscription-based platform, which offers a library of live comedy specials (including those filmed and edited by the in-house production team), live recording tickets and discounts. It has been referred to as the "Netflix of UK stand-up Comedy". They offer one subscription plan that includes access to all of their content, 50% of revenue go to the acts, and watch without any ads, access content from any device, and in-person tickets to 50+ live shows a year. During a livestream, platform users are able to utilize a chat feature to engage with other viewers. For those that miss the livestream, NextUp also offers a Catch Up option for certain shows. These shows will be recorded and available to watch on the platform for a limited period of time.

=== Community involvement ===
Comedians with shows on the platform are supported through a 50/50 revenue share model and NextUp provides rehearsal space for comedians in its London office. Social impact projects are supported such as 'The Care Home Tour' that saw comedians perform for dementia care home residents. During COVID-19, they raised over £150k for acts who lost their income.

== Content ==
=== Livestreaming ===
Over the recent years NextUp Comedy has partnered with comedy festivals nationwide such as the Edinburgh Fringe and Leicester Comedy Festival to provide viewers with the opportunity to see some of their favorite acts without having to leave their homes.

=== Edinburgh Fringe Festival ===
In 2022, NextUp Comedy announced that they would be livestreaming 50+ shows from the Edinburgh Fringe for the first time ever since the arts festival's founding. The company highlighted that pandemic and accessibility concerns created a desire for alternative forms of watching stand-up shows. By streaming the Fringe they were able to provide comedy fans from all over the world with the opportunity to watch some of their favorite acts at the biggest comedy festival in the world. They partnered with several venues including the Gilded Balloon and The Pleasance. Fringe events such as The Wrestling, Late N Live and final of So You Think You’re Funny were featured as part of their program highlights. The full streaming lineup included Mark Watson, Harriet Dyer, Patrick Spicer, Arthur Smith, Brennan Reece, the Chortle Student Comedy Awards, Christopher Bliss, Chris Turner, Christy Coysh, Conrad Koch, Esther Manito, Hal Cruttenden, Ignacio Lopez, Jack Tucker, Jake Farrell, Javier Jarquin, Jen Ives, Morgan Rees, NewsRevue, Nick Helm, The Oxford Imps, Pete Heat, Rajiv Karia, Rosie Holt, Schalk Bezuidenhout, Shelf, Sikisa, Tarot, Will Duggan, Yuriko Kotani, Fred MacAulay, Sean McLoughlin, Jamie D'Souza, Rob Rouse, All Killa No Filla Live, Showstopper! The Improvised Musical, Jake Lambert, The Comedy Arcade, Finlay Christie, Celya AB, Tom Rosenthal (actor), Shazia Mirza, and Justin Moorhouse.

In addition to streaming shows on their platform, NextUp Comedy a few shows were streamed to cinemas across the UK so the audience can watch their favorite shows with fellow fans.

NextUp have streamed the Edinburgh Fringe every year since 2022. In 2024 they partnered with ITVx to produce 'ITV Presents:Live Comedy from the Edinburgh Fringe' hosted by Judi Love, a four episode series of mixed bill nights streamed live from Edinburgh. In 2025 NextUp Partnered with Samsung TV+ to stream 15 shows from the Fringe, directly to Samsung TVs.

==== Access Festival ====
The platform launched a partnership in January 2023 with Impatient Productions, co-founded by Mark Watson and Lianne Coop, to stream Access Festival, an online-only comedy festival that allow the audience the opportunity to interact with the comedian through a Zoom show or via NextUp's platform. This festival was inspired by comedians who experimented with hundreds of online comedy gigs that connected people worldwide throughout the pandemic and aims to open up comedy to thousands of people who have had the door barred to them by health, economic, geographical or other factors. NextUp Comedy streamed and moderated over 15 stand-up shows throughout the month including No More Jockeys, Sarah Keyworth, Bilal Zafar, Laura Lexx, and more. The festival was accessible through a NextUp Comedy annual subscription which also provided new users with access to the rest of their content library.

To further emphasize the festival's mission of accessibility NextUp and Impatient Productions teamed up with Below the Line, a charity platform where comedy fans can donate through an anonymous pay-it-forward ticket to buy online comedy tickets for fellow fans who can’t afford them.

=== Platform specials ===
NextUp offers 60 minute comedy 'specials' which are full length shows available on demand. These shows include a wide range of comedic genres such as observational, sketch, character, alternative, and storytelling. 'Specials' feature a variety of comedians from well known acts to up and coming stars.

== Comedians filmed by NextUp ==
Notable comedians who have had their shows filmed by NextUp include:

- Abigoliah Schamaun
- Angela Barnes
- Adam Hess
- Alasdair Beckett-King
- Alice Fraser
- Alison Spittle
- Amy Annette
- Andrew Maxwell
- Brendon Burns
- Brennan Reece
- Bobby Mair
- Clinton Baptiste
- Colin Hoult
- Danielle Ward
- Ed Aczel
- Eleanor Morton
- Esther Manito
- Fern Brady
- Funmbi Omotayo
- Geoff Norcott
- Gráinne Maguire
- Hal Cruttenden
- Holly Burn
- Ian Smith
- Jessica Fostekew
- Jen Brister
- Jason Byrne
- Jordan Brookes
- Josh Glanc
- Joz Norris
- Kiri Pritchard-McLean
- Laura Lexx
- Lauren Pattison
- Lily Philips
- Lou Sanders
- Lucy Porter
- Maisie Adam
- Njambi McGrath
- Paul Sinha
- Rachel Parris
- Sam Simmons
- Shaparak Khorsandi
- Stuart Laws
- Sukh Kaur Ojla
- Tom Stade
- Tiff Stevenson
- Tim Renkow
- Zoe Lyons
