= Road star =

Road star may refer to:

- Roadstar, a British hard rock & heavy metal band
- Yamaha XV1600A motorcycle
