= Lyla Foy =

- Born: 1988 (age 37–38); London
- Genres: Folk; dream pop; pop; rock
- Occupation: Singer-songwriter; Record producer
- Years active: 2012–present
- Label: Sub Pop
- Website: www.lylafoy.co.uk

Lyla Foy (born 1988) is an English, London-based singer-songwriter. Her music has been described as "somewhere between folk and dream pop" and has been praised for its "texture and rhythmic complexity". She sings, writes, and produces her music.

She has been the opening act for The National, Sharon Van Etten, Midlake, Phosphorescent, and Fleet Foxes. Lyla also sings and plays bass with psychedelic six-piece, Mono Club, fronted by John Herbert of Goldheart Assembly.

== Biography ==
=== Early life ===
Foy liked music from an early age; her father listened to Ella Fitzgerald. However, she did not have musical parents. Foy taught herself to play guitar as a teenager.

=== Career ===
Foy released her debut single "Magazine" in September 2012 under her band's name, WALL.

In March 2013, Foy released her debut EP Shoestring, named after the title track of the same name. The EP also included the tracks "Left to Wonder", "Place Too Low" and "All Alone".

In October 2013, Foy dropped her stage name WALL for her real name, Lyla Foy and signed a recording contract with Sub Pop. Foy released a double a-side called "Easy" / "Head Down" via Subpop.

On 18 March 2014, Foy released her debut album, Mirrors The Sky, via Sub Pop. The album contained ten songs, including "Honeymoon", "I Only" and "No Secrets". One of the songs, "Impossible", serves as the end credits music for the season one episode "Say Anything" of BoJack Horseman.

== Discography ==
=== Studio albums ===
- Mirrors the Sky (2014), Sub Pop
- Bigger Brighter (2018), INgrooves
- Fornever (2021), self-released
- Year of the Black Water Rabbit (2023)

=== Singles and EPs ===
As WALL:

- "Magazine" / "Over My Head" (2012), Black Cab Sessions
- "Shoestring" (2013), Big Picnic

As Lyla Foy:

- "Cinderella" (2008), Iffy Records
- "Easy" / "Head Down" (2013), Sub Pop
- "UMi" (2015), self-released
