= The Comedian's Guide to Survival =

- Film poster
- Directed by: Mark Murphy
- Written by: James Mullinger, Mark Murphy
- Produced by: Alan Latham
- Starring: James Buckley; Myanna Buring; Paul Kaye; Neil Stuke; Vas Blackwood; Natalie Stone; Clair Buckley
- Cinematography: Joan Bordera
- Edited by: Dragos Teglas
- Production companies: GSP Studios; Premier Picture; Red Rock Entertainment; Fh-Studio ( Montreal )
- Release date: 28 October 2016
- Countries: United Kingdom, Canada
- Language: English
- Budget: $3 million
- Box office: $95

The Comedian's Guide to Survival is a 2016 British-Canadian comedy film written by James Mullinger and Mark Murphy and starring James Buckley.

== Cast ==
- James Buckley as James Mullinger
- Myanna Buring as Nell
- Paul Kaye as Phillip
- Neil Stuke as Adam
- Vas Blackwood as Dustin
- Natalie Stone as Olivia
- Clair Buckley as Pam
- Kevin Eldon as Nick Secker
- Peter Woodward as Morris
- Jalaal Hartley as Lance
- Richard Sandling as Richard
- James Mullinger as Brad Macey
- Mark Heap as Pick Up Driver
- Adrian Bouchet as Fox and Hounds Landlord
- Jimmy Carr as himself
- Gilbert Gottfried as himself
- Omid Djalili as himself
- Luenell as herself
- Mike Wilmot as himself
- Gina Yashere as herself
- Brendon Burns as himself
- Mike Ward as himself

== Production ==
Principal photography for The Comedian's Guide to Survival took place in London in August 2015, following filming at Just For Laughs in Montreal, Quebec, Canada in July 2015. There was also additional filming in Hampshire, England.
