= James Dale =

James Dale may refer to:

- James Dale (activist) (born 1970), respondent in Boy Scouts of America et al. v. Dale
  - Boy Scouts of America v. Dale, a Supreme Court case involving a New Jersey scoutmaster
- Jim Dale (born 1935), English actor
- James Dale (cricketer) (1789–1828), English cricketer
- James Badge Dale (born 1978), American actor
- James Charles Dale (1792–1872), English naturalist
- James Dale (MP), English politician
- James Dale (footballer) (born 1993), English footballer
- James Dale (scientist), Australian agricultural scientist
- James Dale (musician) (born 1982), English singer and songwriter
