= Goldheart Assembly =

English indie pop/rock band

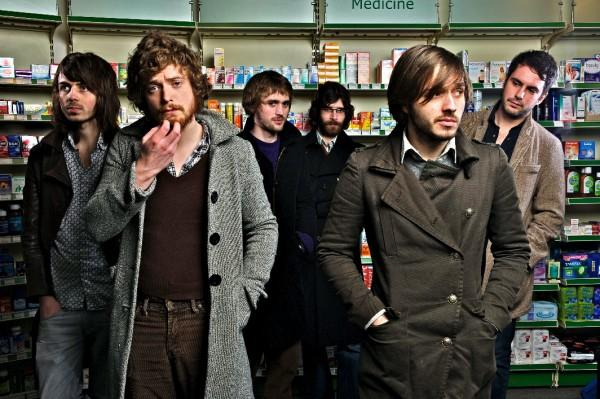

Background information
- Origin: London, England
- Genres: Indie pop, indie rock, indie folk
- Years active: 2007–2017
- Label: Fierce Panda
- Members: Jake Bowser; James Dale; Nicky Francis; Kyle Hall; John Herbert
- Past members: Thomas Hastings; Dominic Keshavarz
- Website: goldheartassembly.com

Goldheart Assembly are an English indie pop/rock band from London, England.

== History ==
Goldheart Assembly formed in 2007, naming themselves after a Guided By Voices song, The Goldheart Mountaintop Queen Directory. They quickly found a lifelong fan in DJ Steve Lamacq, who, in February 2009, made them the first unsigned band to record a Radio 1 Maida Vale Session in over a decade. In the same year, the band performed on the BBC Introducing Stage at the Glastonbury Festival, as well as slots at the Camden Crawl, Isle of Wight, Wychwood, Middlesbrough Music Live, Reading & Leeds and V festival.

Goldheart Assembly’s debut single, a double A-side featuring the tracks "So Long St. Christopher" and "Oh Really", was released on 15 June 2009 on the independent label Heron Recordings, set up by Pat Long the then assistant editor of the NME.

In late 2009, Goldheart Assembly signed to the independent UK label Fierce Panda Records, who had previously launched the career of Coldplay. Their debut album, Wolves and Thieves, was released to digital download on 8 March 2010, with CD release on 15 March. The majority of the album was recorded at Forncett Industrial Steam Museum in Norfolk, England, and several tracks feature the sound of live Victorian steam engines. The remaining tracks were recorded at Jools Holland's Helicon studios with British producer Laurie Latham. The album received widespread critical praise.

The band started working on their second album, Long Distance Song Effects, in 2011. Twenty five tracks initially recorded in London were gradually whittled down during trips back and forth to Lucerne where they recorded with Swiss musician Tobi Gmür, who they had met on an earlier European tour.

In October 2011, the band appeared on Last Call with Carson Daly performing 4 songs from their debut album. Ed Sheeran, Kasabian, Dr Dog, Father John Misty and The Decemberists all made appearances on the show in the same season.

Long Distance Song Effects, their second album, was released in July 2013. The Allmusic journalist, Heather Phares, noted that "the control and variety they display throughout Long Distance Song Effects shows that Goldheart Assembly have come into their own here".

The band signed to Faber Music on 7 May 2013.

In 2017, the band signed to LGM Records, a newly founded label run by former EMF and VP of A&R for Epic Records Ian Dench, James Dale, Kaziu Gill and Felix Matthews.

In December 2017, the band announced that they would be reuniting with original members, Dominic Keshavarz and Thomas Hastings, to perform one final show in London. Goldheart Assembly's Last Waltz was on 7 December 2017 at ULU. The band were joined on stage by members of The Magic Numbers, Starsailor, EMF, The Bluetones, Treetop Flyers, as well as, Lyla Foy, Ren Harvieu and Michelle Stodart.

== Press ==
The band has recently picked up much favourable press, including a double-page article in NME magazine on 3 April 2010 and a feature in The Guardian's First Sight column. They were also awarded the front cover of XYZ Magazine, with the interviewer claiming "Sometimes bands come along and make you remember why you love music. Goldheart Assembly are one of those bands."

Since its release, Wolves and Thieves has received universal acclaim from the music and UK national press, with positive reviews in publications including Mojo, Uncut and NME magazines as well as The Sun and The Independent newspapers.

Mike Diver of the BBC stated that "Such is the inherent sweetness of Goldheart Assembly’s debut that the listener can’t fail to be touched by its charms."

The second album, Long Distance Song Effects, also received widespread critical acclaim with publications such as The Guardian, Metro, Allmusic and NME all awarding the album 4-star reviews.

== Live ==
A popular live act, Goldheart Assembly have toured multiple times with Band of Horses and The Magic Numbers, and have also travelled extensively with acts such as The Civil Wars, The Low Anthem, We Are Scientists and Black Mountain.

The band has sold out legendary London venues such as the Dublin Castle, The Lexington, The Borderline, Bush Hall, the ICA, King's College London Students' Union and Scala.

They have performed at festivals such as Austin's SXSW, Vienna's Frequency Festival, Reading & Leeds, Glastonbury Festival, Isle of Wight, the Camden Crawl, Wychwood, Middlesbrough Music Live, Hard Rock Calling and V festival.

In March 2014, as part of Fierce Panda’s 20th anniversary celebrations, the band played Wolves and Thieves live in its entirety at a sell-out show at The Lexington in King's Cross.

In June 2016 they reformed to play, again at the Lexington. Initially planned as an acoustic set it became a set with the full band. Further dates were announced.

== Style ==
Goldheart Assembly's sound has been described as organic and characterised by pastoral west-coast style vocal harmonies.

Initially compared to Seattle folk group The Fleet Foxes, journalists have since drawn comparisons with The Beatles, Television, Traffic and Dr Dog, with Radio 1 DJ Huw Stephens stating "Live, they succeed in being lovely and rousing, and have melodies to make Fleet Foxes back off and rethink their tunes."

== After the Break Up ==
Band members John Herbert, Jake Bowser, Nicky Francis and Kyle Hall went on to collaborate on new project Mono Club. Nicky Francis has also released music with the orchestral-folk band The Quill.

== Members ==
Goldheart Assembly were:

- James Dale: lead vocals, bass, autoharp, misc.
- John Herbert: lead vocals, guitar, misc.
- Nicky Francis: drums, vocals, misc.
- Jake Bowser: instruments with keys, vocals, misc.
- Kyle Hall: guitar.
- Thomas Hastings: guitar, bass, vocals, misc.
- Dominic Keshavarz: guitar.

== Discography ==
Albums

- Wolves and Thieves (March 2010) Fierce Panda Records
- Long Distance Song Effects (July 2013) EMI / New Music Club

Singles

- "So Long St. Christopher" / "Oh Really" (June 2009) Heron Recordings
- "King of Rome" (March 2010) Fierce Panda Records
- "Under The Waterway" (May 2010) Fierce Panda Records
- "Last Decade" / "Going Down Well" (November 2010) Fierce Panda Records
- "Harvest in the Snow" (free download) (March 2011) Fierce Panda Records
- "Into Desperate Arms" (July 2014) EMI / New Music Club
