= Turn Back Time =

Turn Back Time may refer to:

- "Turn Back Time" (Aqua song), 1998
- "Turn Back Time" (Sub Focus song), 2013
- Turn Back Time (TV series), a 2006 British television series
- Turn Back Time – The High Street, a 2010 British documentary series

== See also ==
- "If I Could Turn Back Time", a 1989 song by Cher
- "Turn Back the Hands of Time", a 1970 song by Tyrone Davis
- "If I Could Turn Back the Hands of Time", a 1999 song by R. Kelly
