= Dara and Ed's Great Big Adventure =

Dara and Ed's Great Big Adventure is a BBC Two TV show containing the events of Dara Ó Briain and Ed Byrne as they journey the Pan-American Highway. In 2017 the two went on a second journey together, which aired as Dara and Ed's Road to Mandalay.
