= Ed Byrne (comedian) =

Irish comedian (born 1972)

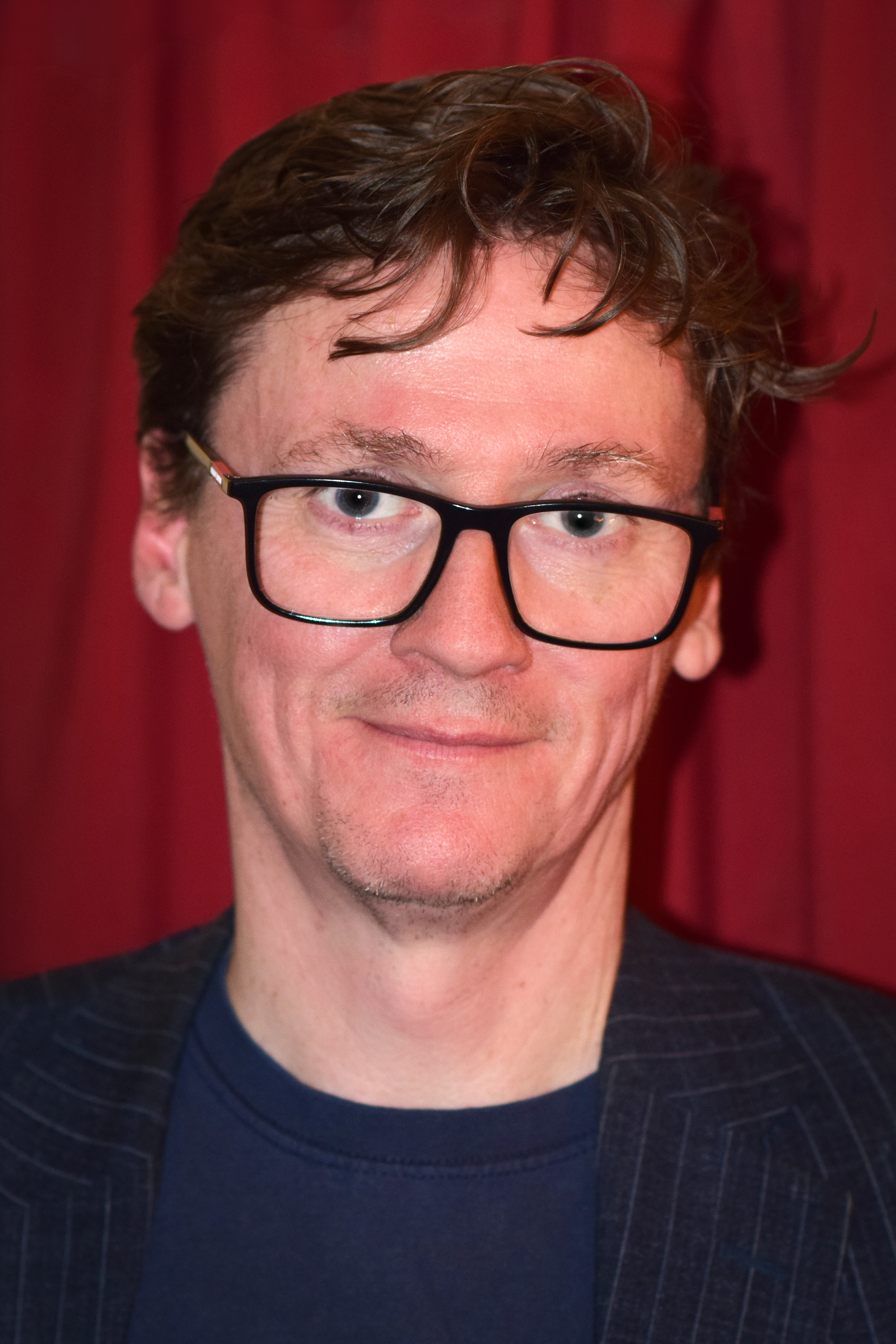
- Byrne in 2023
- Born: Ed Cathal Byrne; April 10, 1972 (age 54); Dublin, Ireland
- Spouse: Claire Walker (m. 2008)
- Children: 2

Comedy career
- Years active: 1993–present
- Medium: Actor, comedian
- Genres: Observational comedy, social satire
- Website: edbyrne.com

Ed Cathal Byrne (born April 1972) is an Irish actor and comedian. He has presented the British television shows Just for Laughs and Uncut! Best Unseen Ads, has been a guest on numerous television panel games and has appeared on a number of television cooking shows.

== Early life ==
Byrne was born on April 10, 1972 in Dublin, Ireland, and grew up in Swords, County Dublin. His father was a sheet metal worker who became a supervisor, and his mother was a radiographer and lectured in radiography.

== Career ==
=== Stand-up comedy ===
Deciding to study horticulture at the University of Strathclyde in Glasgow, he was made entertainments convener at the Students' Union in his second year of study. Byrne also volunteered at the Student Association Welfare Office in his first year. Byrne started a comedy night called The Comedy Cellar in the basement of the 13th Note public house on Glassford Street, Glasgow. On the first night, Byrne appeared on the roster alongside Armando Iannucci's brother David. Over the following few months, acts booked included Ford Kiernan, Phil Kay, Greg Hemphill, Alan Francis and Alan Tyler. After a few months he gave up studying and headed to London. He was later booked to appear at The Comedy Cellar by new convenors Ford Kiernan and J.P. Leach. In 1997 part of a routine famously questioned Ironic (song) by Alanis Morissette for not meeting the definition of irony. After building up his act on observational comedy, Byrne was nominated for the prestigious Perrier Comedy Award at the 1998 Edinburgh Festival Fringe.

In 2006 he toured the UK, recording a DVD in Leeds entitled Pedantic and Whimsical, which was largely a "greatest hits" set of his material to date. He has also appeared in Father Ted and performed voice-over work in the Carphone Warehouse adverts. In February 2007 Byrne appeared on a comedians' special edition of Weakest Link.

Byrne has performed eight sell-out shows at the Edinburgh Festival Fringe and four sell-out UK tours. He has performed in Canada, France, Australia, New Zealand and the United States. He has since garnered a raft of major broadcast credits, including five US appearances on Late Night with Conan O'Brien (NBC). In July 2007, Byrne made his début at the Newbury Comedy Festival, having participated in the Cat Laughs Comedy Festival in Kilkenny shortly before. He recorded a live DVD Different Class at the King's Theatre, Glasgow, on 23 March 2009, which was released on 23 November of that year.

On 15 September 2010, Byrne, along with 54 other public figures, signed an open letter published in The Guardian, stating their opposition to Pope Benedict XVI's state visit to the UK.

Byrne frequently appeared on BBC stand-up comedy programme Mock the Week as the most frequent guest panellist, having appeared on 73 episodes during the show's run.

=== Television work ===
Byrne's earliest television appearances included the ITV shows The Big Big Talent Show and Blind Date. He also appeared in Father Ted as a teenager mocking Father Ted and two other priests on a phone chat line in the episode "A Christmassy Ted". Byrne has presented television shows Uncut! Best Unseen Ads and Just for Laughs, and has been a regular guest on The Panel, HeadJam, Mock the Week and Never Mind the Buzzcocks. He has also appeared on Lily Savage's Blankety Blank, Have I Got News for You, The Bubble, The Unbelievable Truth, Bring Me the Head of Light Entertainment and We Need Answers. He has also appeared on The Graham Norton Show six times.

Byrne featured in a series of comedy shorts on the MSN Video Channel in which he discusses some of his pet hates, including occasional smokers and his girlfriend's snoring. Byrne appeared in the second part of the BBC2 programme Three Men Go to Scotland on 30 December 2010 whilst hitching a ride to reach the Cuillin mountains on Skye for his Munro bagging attempt – climbing every mountain in Scotland over 3,000 feet (910 m). On 31 March 2012, Byrne appeared on All Star Family Fortunes.

On 5 July 2012, Byrne appeared as a guest on The One Show. Byrne presented segments during Volcano Live from 9 to 12 July. He appeared on a celebrity version of The Chase on 30 November 2013, where he successfully brought £117,000 through, a record for the programme. Dara and Ed's Great Big Adventure, a 2015 three-part fly-on-the-wall television series, followed Byrne and Dara Ó Briain (fellow Irish comedian and best friend) in their journey by car down the Pan-American Highway.

In January 2013 Byrne was a contestant on episode 4 of BBC's The Great Comic Relief Bake Off and won the Technical Challenge with his lemon meringue pie. In January 2014 he hosted episode 4 of The Great Sport Relief Bake Off on BBC Two.

In January and February 2021 he was a contestant on BBC's Celebrity Best Home Cook. Describing his signature dish, smoked pork ribs, Byrne said, "I cover them in a dry rub that I've been perfecting by trial and error for years, then shove them in a barrel smoker for about 10 hours, spraying them with apple juice and cider to keep them moist." Byrne was described as "a reasonably strong participant" and was named as one of the judges' favourites in episode two. He was eliminated, along with Karim Zeroual, in episode five, on 8 February.

=== Acting ===
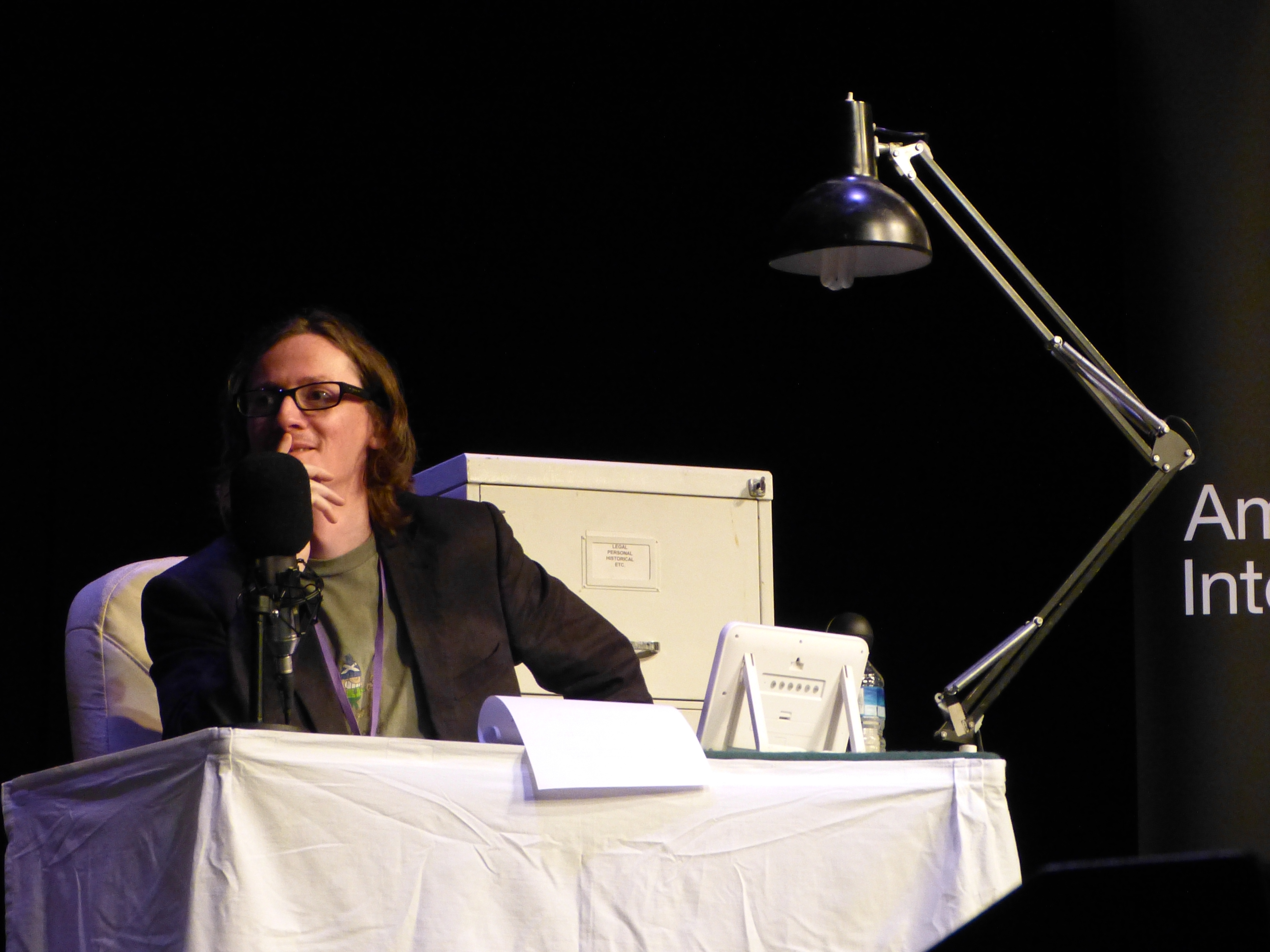
Byrne at the Edinburgh Comedy Festival in 2013

Byrne played the title character in the 2000 ITV adaptation of the pantomime Aladdin and had a small part in the 2000 comedy film Rat. In 2001 Byrne was the main character in an RTÉ-produced sitcom entitled The Cassidys. It was cancelled after one series.

In 2005 he starred in the film, Zemanovaload. The film is about John Davies (played by Byrne) who suffers from multiple obsessive compulsive disorders. When his current model girlfriend leaves him, he decides to replace her with the most attractive woman on the planet, Czech model Veronika Zemanová. The film follows his attempts to curb his old obsessions to meet his latest obsession – Veronika.

Byrne played the part of Luke Dyson in a comedy film set in London called Are You Ready For Love in 2006, for which he won an Angel award at the Monaco Film Festival as best supporting actor.

Byrne plays the part of Irish radio presenter Dylan Dale in the British feature film version of Tony Hawks' book Round Ireland with a Fridge which was released in September 2010 and on DVD on 8 November 2010.

In 2010, Byrne played Rob in the BBC television pilot Reunited.

=== Writing ===
Since 2011, Byrne has written a column for the hillwalking magazine TGO in which he tries a different outdoor activity each month in the company of an expert. He also had a column in the Metro newspaper until January 2012.

== Personal life ==
Byrne married theatre publicist Claire Walker in 2008. The couple live in Essex and have two sons. Fellow comic Dara Ó Briain was best man at his wedding, returning the favour after Byrne was previously Ó Briain's best man in 2006.

On 12 February 2022, Byrne announced via his Twitter account that his younger brother Paul had died aged 44 years old. Paul had also worked in comedy, as a writer, producer and director, developing work with Andrew Maxwell, Roisin Conaty, Glenn Wool, Sarah Keyworth and Sindhu Vee amongst others.

Byrne is an atheist and a patron of Humanists UK.

In September 2026, Byrne was awarded an honorary doctorate at Harper Adams University (Shropshire).

== Stand-up shows ==
Year	Title	Notes
1996	A Stand Up in the Making	First one-man Fringe show
1997	Psychobabble	
1998	A Night at the Opera	
1999–2000	On the Road	
2004–05	Me Again	
2006–07	Standing Up, Falling Down	Biggest-selling comedy show at the 2006 Edinburgh Fringe Festival. Released on DVD as Pedantic and Whimsical
2008–09	Different Class	
2010	Warming Up in the Cold	
2011–12	Crowd Pleaser	
2013–14	Roaring Forties	
2015–16	Outside, Looking In	
2017–19	Spoiler Alert	
2019–23	If I'm Honest...	
2023-	Tragedy Plus Time	

=== DVD releases ===
Title	Released	Notes
Pedantic and Whimsical	21 August 2006	Live at Leeds City Varieties
Different Class	23 November 2009	Live at Glasgow King's Theatre
Crowd Pleaser	28 November 2011	Live at Newcastle City Hall
Roaring Forties	2018	NextUp Comedy special
Outside, Looking In	2018	NextUp Comedy special
Spoiler Alert	2019	NextUp Comedy special

=== Ed Venturing ===
Episode	Location	Platform
1. Rhod Gilbert in Pembrokeshire	Mynydd Carningli	Episode 1 on YouTube
2. Stuart Maconie in the Lake District	High Pike and Carrock	Episode 2 on YouTube
3. Desiree Burch in the South Downs	Bow Hill	Episode 3 on YouTube
4. Hal Cruttenden in the Peak District	Win Hill	Episode 4 on YouTube

== Filmography ==
=== Film ===
Year	Title	Role	Notes
2000	Rat	Rudolph	
2005	Zemanovaload	John Davies	
2006	Are You Ready For Love?	Luke Dyson	
2010	Round Ireland with a Fridge	Dylan Daley	
2021	Creation Stories	Alastair Campbell	Sky Original movie

=== Television ===
Year	Title	Role	Notes
1996	Father Ted	Teenager (uncredited)	Episode: "A Christmassy Ted"
2000	Aladdin	Aladdin	Television pantomime
2001	The Cassidys (TV series)	Barry Cassidy	6 episodes
2001	Sam's Game	Alex	6 episodes
2004	Doctors	Micky Moran	1 episode
2006–2022, 2026	Mock the Week	Himself	75 episodes
2007, 2008, 2009	Have I Got News for You	Himself	4 episodes
2009–2018	Live at the Apollo	Himself/host	4 episodes
2010	Reunited	Rob	Pilot
2010	The Adventures of Daniel	Xantar	
2012	World's Most Dangerous Roads	Himself	1 episode
2013	The Great Comic Relief Bake Off	Contestant	Episode 1.4
2013–2019	Celebrity Chase	Himself	3 episodes
2014	Would I Lie to You?	Guest	Episode 8.4
2014	The Great Sport Relief Bake Off	Host	Episode 3.3
2015	Dara and Ed's Great Big Adventure	Himself	3 episodes
2015	Duck Quacks Don't Echo	Guest	Episode 3.6
2015	The Great Comic Relief Bake Off	Host	Episode 2.4
2016	Into the Wild with Gordon Buchanan	Himself	1 episode
2016	Dara Ó Briain's Go 8 Bit	Contestant	1 episode
2017	Dara and Ed's Road to Mandalay	Himself	3 episodes
2017	Life of a Mountain: A Year on Blencathra	Himself	1 episode
2018	Pilgrimage: The Road to Santiago	Himself	3 episodes
2018	Top Gear	Guest	1 episode
2019	QI	Himself	1 episode
2019	Real Life Superheroes – Our Lives	Himself	1 episode
2019	Al Murray's Great British Pub Quiz	Team Captain	10 episodes
2021	Celebrity Best Home Cook	Contestant	6 episodes
2023	The Weakest Link	Winner	1 episode

=== Radio shows ===
Year	Title	Role	Notes
2018	The Hitchhiker's Guide to the Galaxy: Hexagonal Phase	Hillman Hunter	4 episodes
2019	Puckoon	Dan Milligan	1 episode

== Books ==
- Sit-Down Comedy (contributor to anthology, eds. Malcolm Hardee & John Fleming) Ebury Press/Random House, 2003. ISBN 0-09-188924-3; ISBN 978-0-09-188924-1
