= Dara Ó Briain =

Irish comedian and television presenter (born 1972)

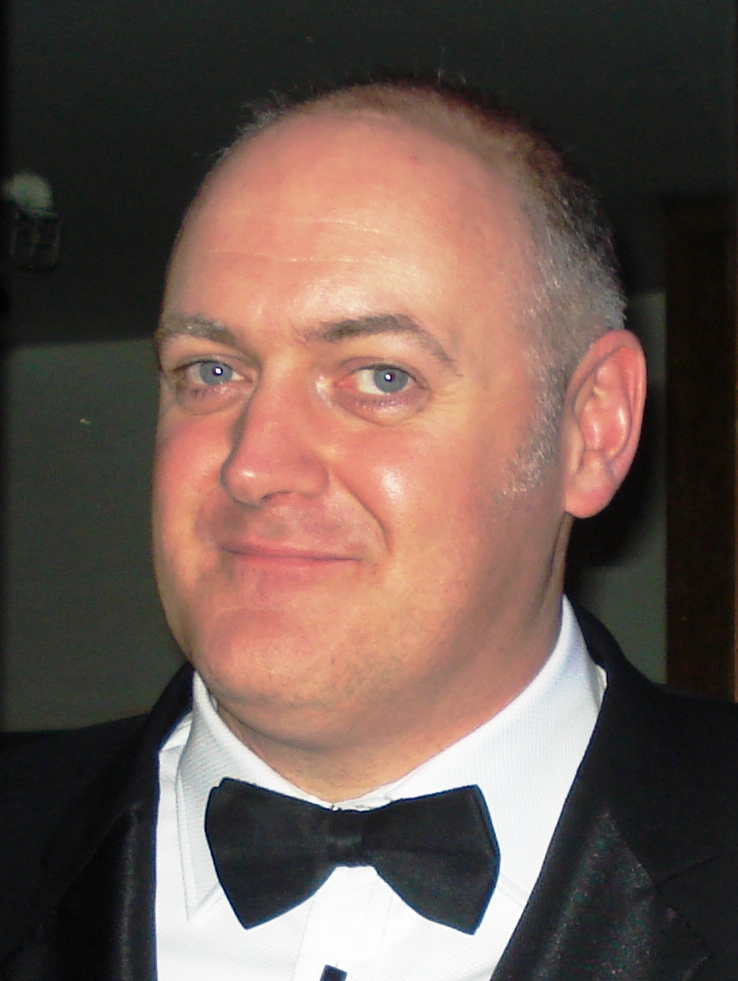
- Ó Briain in 2011
- Born: 4 February 1972 (age 54); Bray, Ireland
- Education: University College Dublin (BSc)
- Notable work: Echo Island; Don't Feed The Gondolas (1998–2000); The Panel (2003–2006); Mock the Week (2005–2022, 2026–); Turn Back Time (2006); The Apprentice: You're Fired! (2010–2014); Stargazing Live (2011–2017); School of Hard Sums (2012–2014); Dara Ó Briain's Science Club (2012–2013); Dara & Ed's Big Adventure (2015); Robot Wars (2016–2018); Dara O Briain's Go 8 Bit (2016–2018); Blockbusters (2019)
- Spouse: Susan Uí Bhriain (m. 2006)
- Children: 3

Comedy career
- Years active: 1994–present
- Medium: Stand-up, television
- Genre: Observational comedy
- Dara Ó Briain's voice Recorded April 2012 from the BBC Radio 4 programme Front Row
- Website: Official website

Dara Ó Briain (/ˈdɑːrə oʊ ˈbriːən, ˈdærə -/ DAR(R)-ə oh BREE-ən, Irish: [ˈd̪ˠaɾˠə oː ˈbʲɾʲiənʲ]; born 4 February 1972) is an Irish comedian and television presenter based in the United Kingdom. He is noted for performing stand-up comedy shows all over the world and for hosting topical panel shows such as Mock the Week, The Panel, and The Apprentice: You're Fired!. In 2009, the Irish Independent described Ó Briain as "Terry Wogan's heir apparent as Britain's 'favourite Irishman'".

In 2012, he was nominated for the BAFTA TV Award for Best Entertainment Performance for his work on Mock the Week.

He has also been a newspaper columnist and written books for both adults and children. His first children's book, Beyond the Sky, was nominated for a Blue Peter Book Award in 2017.

== Early life ==
Ó Briain was born on 4 February 1972 in Bray, County Wicklow, and adopted into what he described as "a stable home" where he enjoyed a happy childhood, raised as an only child by his "supportive" parents.

He attended Coláiste Eoin secondary school, a Gaelcholáiste (Irish-speaking medium school) on Dublin's southside. He attended University College Dublin (UCD), where he studied mathematics and theoretical physics. In 2008, he remarked: "I haven't written it into my act, but it occasionally comes through. I could come on with a chalkboard and say: 'Now you're all going to pay attention.'"

While a student at UCD, he was both the auditor (chairperson) of the Literary and Historical Society (the university's oldest debating society) and the co-founder and co-editor of The University Observer college newspaper.

In 1994, he won the Irish Times National Debating Championship and The Irish Times/Gael Linn National Irish language debating championship; he is a fluent Irish speaker, and speaks to his father only in that language. His granny was a teenage member of the Irish Republican Army (1919–1922), in the war of independence.

He played both Gaelic football and hurling for Bray Emmets and hurling for the Wicklow County minor team.

== After university ==
After graduating in 1994, Ó Briain began working at RTÉ as a children's TV presenter. At this time, he also began performing his first stand-up gigs on the Irish comedy circuit. He admitted, "I did the trip from Dublin to Donegal to play to six people; then I turned round and drove home again. I did about three or four years playing to a lot of bad rooms, but learning as I went. It's not bad when someone gives you £40 for standing up and telling jokes. I remember thinking: 'This is the life.'" Ó Briain spent three years as a presenter on the bilingual (Irish and English) children's programme Echo Island but came to prominence as a team captain on the topical panel show Don't Feed the Gondolas (1998–2000) hosted by Seán Moncrieff. Ó Briain also hosted RTÉ family entertainment gameshow It's a Family Affair.

== Stand-up comedy ==
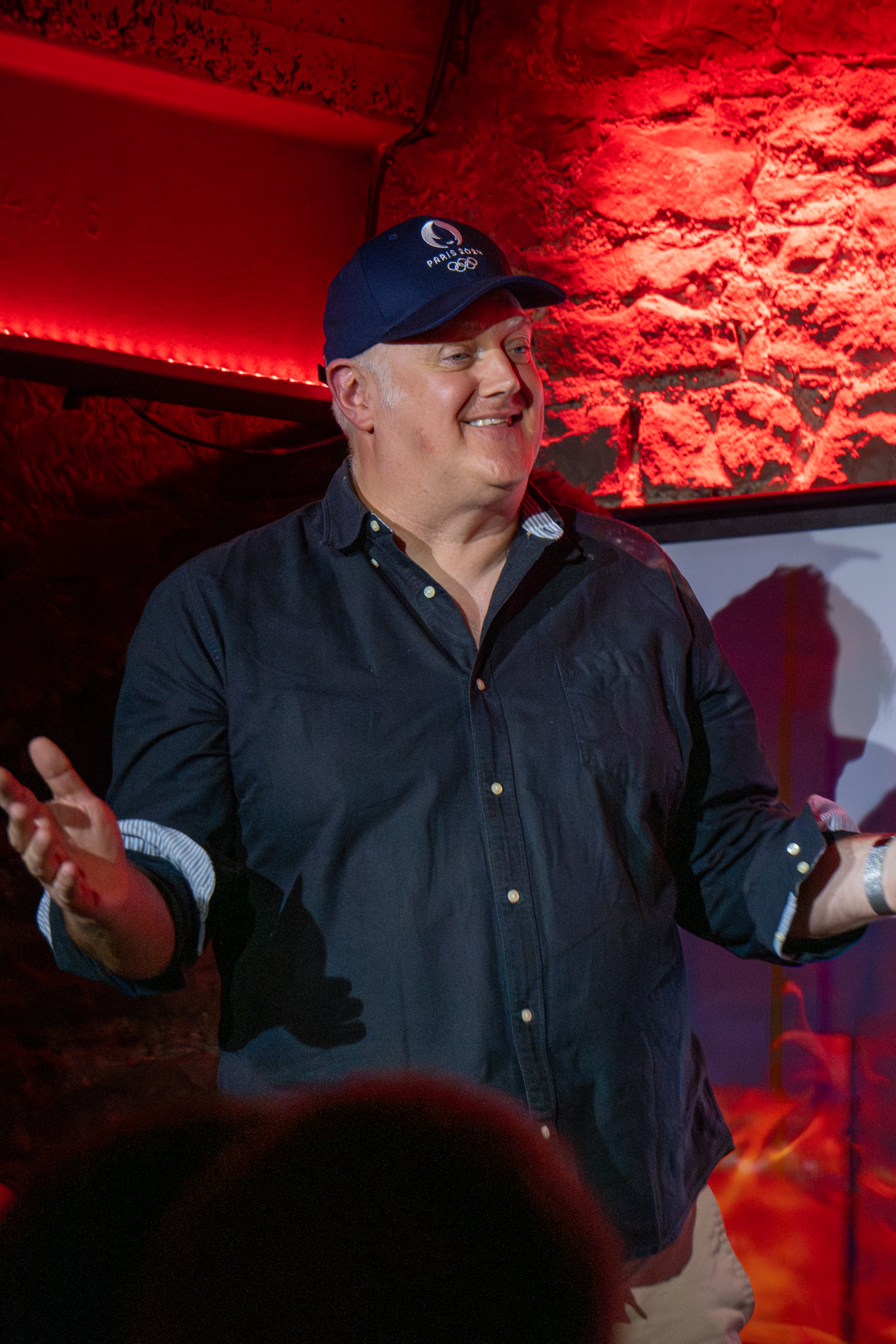
Ó Briain at the 2024 Edinburgh Festival Fringe

Ó Briain's stand-up international career took off around this time as he began to tour heavily, performing across Europe, Asia, Australia and North America, with gigs in Dubai, Paris, Adelaide, Shanghai and New York City. He was a regular at the Kilkenny Cat Laughs and the Edinburgh Festival Fringe, as well as making one notable appearance at the Just For Laughs festival in Montreal in 2002, where he was offered a prestigious gala show because of his performances at the Irish showcase. Around this time, Ó Briain presented the weekend game show It's a Family Affair on RTÉ Television. It was the first time he worked with former Channel 4 commissioning editor Séamus Cassidy. They later set up the production company Happy Endings Productions, and together they produced (and Ó Briain presented) the chat show Buried Alive (2003) and most famously in Ireland The Panel (2003–2006).

In 2005, Ó Briain's eighth show at the Edinburgh Festival Fringe was the biggest-selling solo comedy show of the festival.

In early 2006, Ó Briain conducted his third tour of the United Kingdom and Ireland. This included shows at the Theatre Royal, in London as well as nine nights in Dublin at Vicar Street. His second night in the Theatre Royal, Drury Lane, in London was recorded for his first live DVD. His fourth multinational tour followed in late 2007, which as he says in his routine has "no title" but was almost entitled "You Had to Be There".

He performed new tours across the UK and Ireland in 2008, 2010, 2012, 2015 and 2018. His 2010 tour played for 150 dates, to over 225,000 people, including 37 nights in Vicar St. in Dublin, nine nights at the Hammersmith Apollo in London and a first date in Dubai. Each of those three tours were recorded for DVD, and the 2012 tour, entitled 'Craic Dealer', was similarly recorded during his shows at the Edinburgh Playhouse in May 2012. "Craic Dealer" ran for over 150 shows, as did his 2015 tour "Crowd Tickler", this time with dates in Scandinavia, Northern Europe and Australia added to the tour. The tour was recorded for a DVD release.

On 12 March 2011, Ó Briain, Jack Whitehall and Jon Richardson set a new Guinness World Records title for hosting the 'highest stand-up comedy gig in the world', on a British Airways flight in support of Comic Relief.

In 2011, Ó Briain took part in two shows of the 16-date Uncaged Monkeys tour with Professor Brian Cox, Robin Ince, Ben Goldacre, Simon Singh and Chris Addison.

In October 2017, he started touring his show "Voice of Reason". As well as another 37 nights in Vicar St Theatre in Dublin (to bring his total there to 197 shows), "Voice of Reason" was performed more than 175 times, in 20 countries, including debut shows in Reykjavík, Saint Petersburg, Malta, Germany and New Zealand. It was recorded as a BBC special at the Hammersmith Apollo, for broadcast in 2019. He had originally planned to perform the show on debut tours to the United States and Canada in 2020, but this was postponed after the first four US dates, in early March, due to the COVID-19 pandemic. The Canadian part of the tour resumed in August 2021.

In September 2021, he announced a new show, named "So... Where Were We?", with a tour starting in November 2021. Due to the ongoing COVID-19 pandemic, a portion of the tour in Ireland that was originally planned for January 2022 was pushed back to March through June 2022. He has been touring since and extended the tour.

In February 2025, Ó Briain started his Re:Creation UK and Ireland tour.

== Television career ==
The Panel was hosted by Ó Briain. Three times nominated for the Best Entertainment show IFTA (Irish Film and Television Awards), the show has a rotating cast of panellists, usually drawn from the world of Irish comedy, discussing the events of the week and interviewing guests. The most regular panellists have been Colin Murphy, Ed Byrne, Neil Delamere, Andrew Maxwell and Mairéad Farrell.

Around 2002, with his profile rising in the UK due to his one-man shows at the Edinburgh Festival Fringe, Ó Briain began making appearances on UK television shows such as Bring Me the Head of Light Entertainment (a Channel 5 production) and Never Mind the Buzzcocks. In early 2003, he hosted the second series of BBC Scotland's Live Floor Show. His big break in UK television came in 2003, when he appeared as a guest panellist on the long-running BBC news quiz, Have I Got News for You, subsequently making several appearances as guest host of the show.

In 2003, Ó Briain was nominated at the Chortle Comedy Awards for Live Comedy in the categories Best Compère and Best Headline Act (which he would go on to win). In 2004, he won the Best Headliner award again, as well as being nominated for Best Full-length Show. He hosted the comedy panel show Mock the Week during both its original BBC Two run from 2005–2022, and its TLC revival which premiered in 2026.

On 14 September 2005, Ó Briain appeared as a guest on Room 101, where he got rid of children's television presenters (following his work as a presenter on Echo Island) and once-in-a-lifetime experiences (he was given a once-in-a-lifetime experience on the show by being the second guest to pull the lever that opens the chute to Room 101 – the first had been former host Nick Hancock). He also got rid of banter, Gillian McKeith and magicians.

Between 2006 and 2011, Ó Briain starred in the BBC's Three Men in a Boat series, with Griff Rhys Jones and Rory McGrath. The series included the trio rowing the River Thames, as in the 1889 novel of the same name, sailing from London to the Isle of Wight for a sail boat race, borrowing numerous vessels to make their way from Plymouth to the Isles of Scilly. In 2009, the three took to the Irish canals and rivers on a trip from Dublin to Limerick. In 2010, they explored the Isles of Scotland. In 2011, two more series were made; one travelling from Montenegro to Venice, the other travelling down the New England coast in the US to New York.

Ó Briain has also been an extensive newspaper columnist, with pieces published in many national papers in both the UK and Ireland, from The Sunday Times to The Daily Telegraph. On 9 August 2006 he hosted the first edition of his chat show Turn Back Time, which only ran for one series.

He is a relatively frequent panellist on QI and wrote about Ireland in the QI series E annual. He also occasionally appears on Just a Minute on BBC Radio 4.

He also holds the record for greatest number of appearances on the BBC stand-up showcase Live at the Apollo, where he appeared seven times.

On 1 October 2009, Ó Briain released his first book entitled Tickling the English, about what he considers it means to be English. As part of its promotion, he has stated that he is enthusiastic about English culture and a student of English history, his favourite events being the Gin Craze and the English Civil War. In a review of Tickling the English, Ó Briain was described as Sir Terry Wogan's heir apparent as Britain's "favourite Irishman".

Ó Briain has appeared several times in the BBC Radio science / comedy show The Infinite Monkey Cage which premiered on 30 November 2009 on Radio 4.

Since October 2024, Ó Briain has co-presented Curious Cases, a science programme on Radio 4 with Hannah Fry.

In 2010, Ó Briain replaced Adrian Chiles as the presenter of The Apprentice: You're Fired!. After five years, he quit following the 2014 series.

Ó Briain has hosted the British Academy Video Games Awards 9 times between 2009 and 2019, including 2012, when highlights were also shown on Challenge. In 2012 he hosted the Bafta Television awards, the same year he was nominated for a Best Entertainment Performance Award.

From 3 to 5 January 2011, Ó Briain and Brian Cox presented Stargazing Live on BBC Two, three programmes based at the Jodrell Bank Observatory, scheduled to coincide with the conjunction of Jupiter and Uranus, a partial solar eclipse, and the Quadrantid meteor shower. The two presenters hosted a second series of three-hour-long programmes, plus follow-up 30-minute shows called Stargazing Live: Back to Earth, from 16 to 18 January 2012. From 8 to 10 January 2013, they presented the third series, again accompanied by Back to Earth.

Stargazing Live has continued to run intermittently throughout the decade, including live coverage of the Partial solar eclipse over the UK in 2015, Astronaut Tim Peake's journey to the ISS in 2016, and a 50th anniversary celebration of the Apollo missions in 2019. Stargazing Live was nominated for a Bafta for Best Live Television Event in 2017.

From 16 April 2012, Ó Briain presented an eight-episode series of School of Hard Sums with co-host Marcus du Sautoy on Dave. Each episode was themed and Ó Briain along with a guest attempted to solve various conundrums posted by du Sautoy. Series 2 began on 1 May 2013. On 6 November 2012, Ó Briain began presenting a series called Dara Ó Briain's Science Club, in which he and other celebrities discuss science issues. The first edition of this programme features Ed Byrne talking about how closely related he is to the Neanderthals. Each episode in the series includes a short animated history that has been created by the UK animation and illustration agency 12Foot6.

In 2013, Ó Briain joined Jack Dee, Chelsee Healey, Greg James, Melanie C and Philips Idowu in Through Hell and High Water, a Comic Relief challenge which involved celebrities canoeing the most difficult rapids of the Zambezi River. They raised over £1 million for the charity.

Dara and Ed's Great Big Adventure, a 2015 three-part fly-on-the-wall television series, followed Ó Briain and Ed Byrne on their journey by car down the Pan-American Highway.

In June 2015, Dara Ó Briain Meets Stephen Hawking, in which Ó Briain travels to Cambridge for a series of interviews with theoretical physicist Stephen Hawking, aired on BBC One.

From January to March 2016, Ó Briain presented Tomorrow's Food, a three-episode series alongside Angela Hartnett, Chris Bavin and Dr Shini Somara. The BBC One show looked at the technologies and produce in farms, supermarkets, kitchens and restaurants around the world.

In 2016, Ó Briain began hosting a panel show about video games called Dara O Briain's Go 8 Bit.

Ó Briain presented the 2016 reboot of Robot Wars starting on 24 July, as well as the subsequent two series in 2017.

He hosted a revival of the classic quiz show Blockbusters, which began airing on Comedy Central on 21 March 2019 until 5 December 2019.

In 2019, Ó Briain appeared as a guest on Hypothetical.

In June 2019, he was the host of The Family Brain Games. He co-hosted this with Hannah Critchlow, who was responsible for the psychological analysis and supported by Adam Hampshire.

Ó Briain also presents Channel 4 quiz show One & Six Zeros.

On 23 June 2022, Ó Briain was confirmed to star as a contestant in series 14 of Channel 4 comedy game show Taskmaster. He won the second episode of the series with 30 points, becoming the first person in the show's history to win the maximum possible number of points on offer in a single episode, and later went on to win the series with the highest-ever total score (later eclipsed by John Robins in series 17). In 2024 he returned to compete in the third Taskmaster: Champion of Champions special, against Sarah Kendall, Morgana Robinson, Sophie Duker and Kiell Smith-Bynoe (who was substituting in for Series 15 champion Mae Martin). Once again Ó Briain was victorious.

In August 2023, Ó Briain presented Wonders of the Moon with Dara Ó Briain; a two-part series that aired on Channel 5.

In May 2024, Ó Briain presented a two-part series on Channel 5 called Mysteries of the Pyramids with Dara O Briain.

In July 2024, Wonders of the Sun with Dara Ó Briain; a two-part series presented by Ó Briain aired on Channel 5.

In April 2025, Ó Briain presented Volcano with Dara O Briain, a two-part series on Channel 5.

In February 2026, Ó Briain reprised his role as presenter on Mock the Week, now commisioned by TLC with an increased length of 45 minute shows. In June of the same year, UKTV announced that he would host Dara's Dull Appreciation Society, with comedian John Robins.

== Film work ==
Ó Briain had a cameo role as a generalised alternative comedian in the 2013 British film The Look of Love directed by Michael Winterbottom.

== Personal life ==
Ó Briain married his wife Susan Uí Bhriain, a surgeon, in 2006; they live in West London with their three children, one daughter (born 2008) and two sons (born 2011 and 2015). He was best man at his best friend Ed Byrne's wedding in 2008 after Byrne had previously been Ó Briain's best man. He describes himself as looking like "one of Tony Soprano's henchmen, on a bad day", and said that in 2008, "living in London I probably only get recognised about once a day. And that's okay by me. I'm not a celebrity. And I certainly don't see myself as one".

Ó Briain is an atheist, but has said that he also sees himself as "ethnically Catholic": "I'm staunchly atheist, I simply don't believe in God, even if he believes in me. But I'm still Catholic, of course. Catholicism has a much broader reach than just the religion. I'm technically Catholic, it's the box you have to tick on the census form: 'Don't believe in God, but I do still hate Rangers.'"

His surname is the original Irish form of O'Brien. He said, "My dad was involved in the Irish language movement and changed it. Even Irish people are now confused by it".

Ó Briain is a fan of English football club Arsenal, and of Gaelic games, having played for Wicklow county football team at minor level. When his tweet congratulating London on knocking Sligo out of the 2013 All-Ireland Senior Football Championship was read out on The Sunday Game, Ó Briain expressed amazement and vowed to try to have one read out every week. Ó Briain has also expressed an interest in Irish cricket, and has written about the subject for The Guardian newspaper. As well as this he has attempted to explain hurling to British audiences. He attended many events of the 2024 Summer Olympics in Paris.

Ó Briain was one of fifteen members of a racing greyhound syndicate for several years. The December 2009 transmission of Three Men Go to Ireland featured their dog Snip Nua who, by the time of transmission, had been put down following injuries sustained in a race. Ó Briain was so upset about the death that he and his fellow syndicate members immediately disbanded the syndicate permanently. In early 2010, a series of small demonstrations were held outside some of Ó Briain's tour venues, urging him to publicly denounce the sport of greyhound racing due to the dog's death.

In 2020, Ó Briain tweeted that an asteroid had been named after him: 4901 Ó Briain.

In 2020, having known that he was adopted, Ó Briain successfully sought out his birth family; he eventually met his biological mother, father and six siblings. Ó Briain based two subsequent stand-up comedy tours on the experience of finding and meeting his birth parents.

In 2022, Ó Briain became one of the Patrons for the Plaza Cinema, Stockport.

== Stand-up DVDs ==
Title	Released	Venue
Live at the Theatre Royal	13 November 2006	Theatre Royal, London
Dara Ó Briain Talks Funny – Live in London	17 November 2008	Hammersmith Apollo, London
This Is the Show	22 November 2010	Hammersmith Apollo, London
Craic Dealer	12 November 2012	The Playhouse, Edinburgh
Crowd Tickler	23 November 2015	Hammersmith Apollo, London

== See also ==
- Auditors of the Literary and Historical Society (University College Dublin)
- List of atheists in film, radio, television and theatre
