= Newbury Comedy Festival =

The Newbury Comedy Festival was a festival of comedy which took place every July in the West Berkshire town of Newbury, in England. The last festival took place in 2012 although the You Must Be Joking new act competition continues on its own steam.

== History ==
It was launched in 2004. Committed to showcasing the best comedy talent working in the UK (and not exclusively stand-up), the comedy festival became an annual event, held in the second week of July), and the only fully curated festival of its kind in the UK. In 2006, over 70 acts performed in 12 venues in Newbury.

The Independent described the Festival as "the premier summer comic gathering outside Edinburgh", with The Daily Telegraph urging readers "not to bypass it".

== Notable acts ==
Acts who have appeared include Linda Smith, Emo Philips, Jimmy Carr, Alan Carr, Natalie Haynes, Al Murray, Rich Hall, Russell Brand, Barry Cryer, Laura Solon, Chris Addison, Howard Read, Janet Street-Porter, Wil Hodgson, Jo Brand, Jenny Eclair, Gina Yashere, Sue Perkins, Susie Essman, Ardal O'Hanlon, Ed Byrne, Phill Jupitus and Josie Long.

== You Must Be Joking ==
Sponsored by mobile phone giant, Vodafone, the Festival also promotes a new act competition, You Must Be Joking. The winners to date are:

- 2015: Benji Waterstones
- 2014: Peter Beckley, 2nd Don Tran
- 2013: Matt Dwyer
- 2012: Sean Doyle
- 2011: Chris Chopping
- 2010: Matt Richardson
- 2009: Ian Smith (comedian) 2nd Matthew Highton
- 2008: Gerry Howell, Runners Up Mark Simmons, Tom Goodliffe
- 2007: Hannah Dunleavy, 2nd Gareth Richards
- 2006: Tim Telling
- 2005: Papa CJ
- 2004: Imran Yusuf

In 2006, Wisecrackers, a stand-up competition/professional mentoring programme for young people was also launched. In 2006 the winner was Christian Robertson. In 2007, the winners for the 16–18 category were Jacob Guberg and Alexander Quayle.
