= The Cassidys (TV series) =

2001 Irish television series

- Genre: Comedy
- Starring: Ed Byrne; Alison McKenna; Sinéad Keenan; Niamh Daly; Amelia Crowley; Tom Farrelly; Aidan Kelly; Jason O'Mara; Rynagh O'Grady; Karen Ardiff
- Country of origin: Ireland
- Original language: English
- No. of series: 1
- No. of episodes: 6

Production
- Production locations: Studio 4, RTÉ Television Centre, Donnybrook, Dublin 4, Ireland
- Camera setup: Multi-camera
- Running time: 30 minutes

Original release
- Network: Network 2
- Release: 1 October – 5 November 2001

The Cassidys is an Irish television sitcom that aired on Network 2 for one series in 2001. Written by Brian Lynch, the series starred comedian Ed Byrne and actress Sinéad Keenan.

== Plot ==
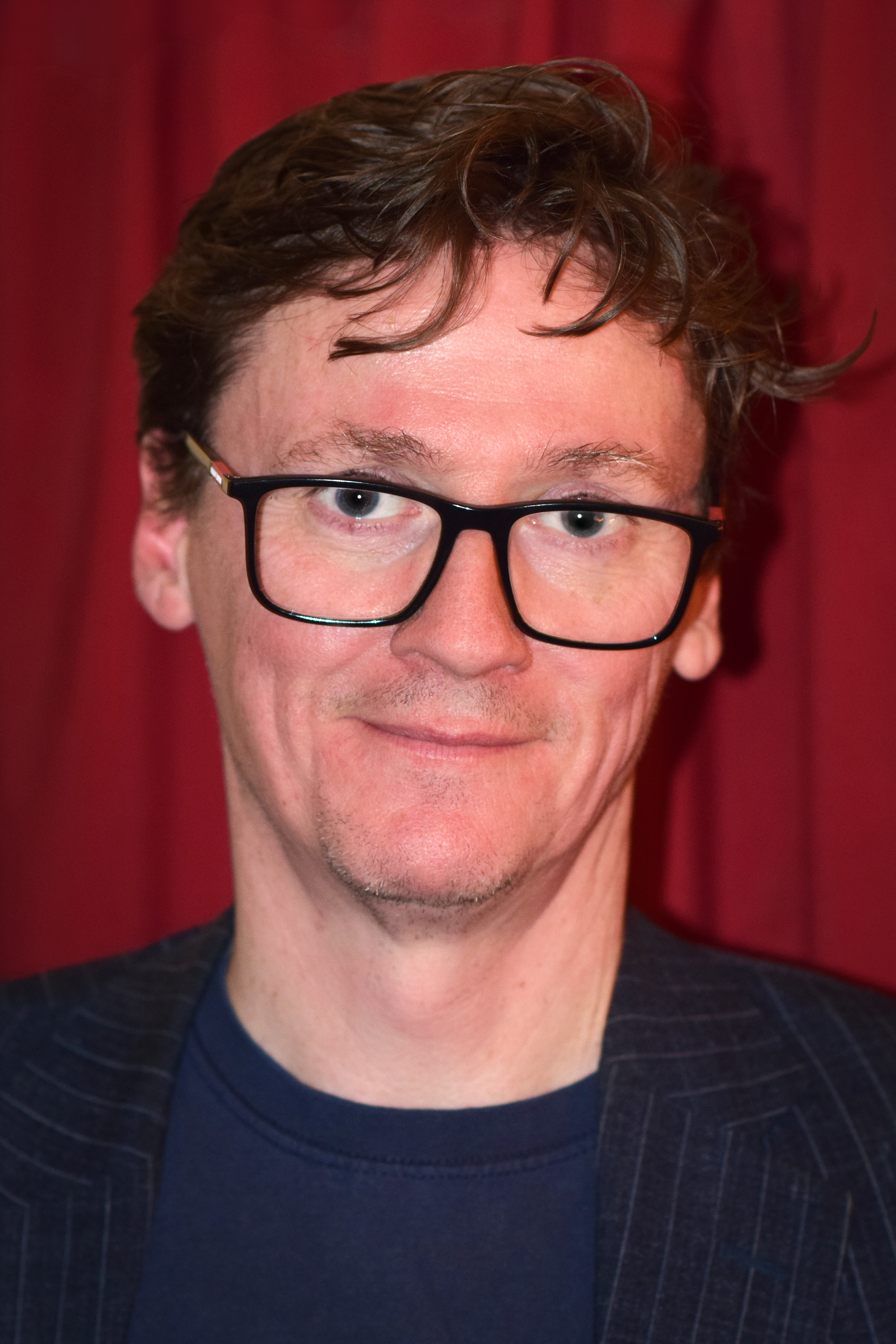
Comedian Ed Byrne, star of The Cassidys

The show evolved around three members of the twenty-something Cassidy family living in a house outside Dublin. Emma is a moderately successful business woman striving to be sophisticated and suave, but she is failing miserably. Barry is a neurotic out of work actor who thinks he is well-rounded and well-balanced. Lisa is deeply insecure but disguises this with her sarcasm and condescension.

== Production ==
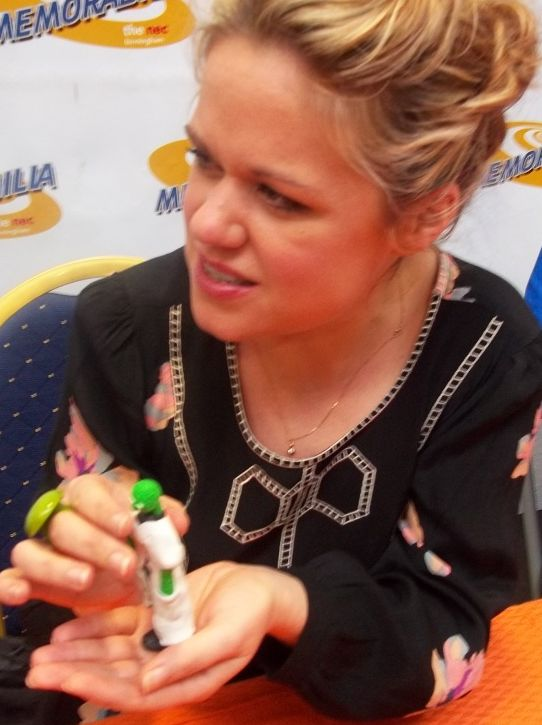
Sinéad Keenan, star of The Cassidys

The interior scenes for the series were shot in Studio 4 at the RTÉ Television Centre while the exterior scenes were shot at various locations around Dublin. The series was filmed in front of a live studio audience.

== Reception ==
The series received mostly negative reviews from the very start. Sinéad Egan, writing in the Sunday Tribune, was critical of the first episode, referring to the script as lame and not funny with stereotypical characters. Liam Fay of the Sunday Times described the show as "relatively awful" and compared it with Upwardly Mobile. Other critics dismissed it as a "second-hand dire comedy, which isn't funny" and derided its weak characterisation and lack of comedy.
