= Buried Alive (talk show) =

Buried Alive is a talk show broadcast on RTÉ One in Ireland. It is hosted by the Irish comedian Dara Ó Briain. Each week a celebrity from Irish society is invited onto the show to view their own "obituary film". The show highlights the careers of different celebrities and sees their reactions to different parts of their lives.

Past guests include:

- Barry McGuigan
- Mary Coughlan
- Dave Fanning
- Ray Houghton
- David Norris
- Eddie O'Sullivan
- Frank Kelly
- Eileen Reid
- Mary Peters
- Louis Walsh

== See also ==
- List of programmes broadcast by Telefís Éireann
