= The Ark (film) =

- Genre: Biblical epic Drama
- Written by: Tony Jordan
- Directed by: Kenneth Glenaan
- Starring: David Threlfall; Joanne Whalley; Ashley Walters; Don Warrington; Michael C. Fox; Ian Smith
- Country of origin: United Kingdom
- Original language: English

Production
- Running time: 90 minutes
- Production companies: BBC; Lipsync Productions; Red Planet Pictures; Winant Productions

Original release
- Network: BBC One
- Release: 30 March 2015

The Ark is a BBC One biblical television film, broadcast on 30 March 2015, which retells the story of Noah's Ark from the Book of Genesis and the Book of Enoch.

== Cast ==
- David Threlfall as Noah
- Joanne Whalley as Emmie
- Ashley Walters as The Angel
- Don Warrington as Paul
- Michael C. Fox as Shem
- Ian Smith as Ham
- Andrew Hawle as Japheth
- Nico Mirallegro as Kenan
- Emily Bevan as Salit
- Hannah John-Kamen as Nahlab
- Georgina Campbell as Aris
- Antonia Thomas as Sabba
