= INTRO Festival =

Music event in North Yorkshire, England

INTRO Festival (known as Middlesbrough Music Live until 2010) was an annual music festival in England held across multiple stages in Middlesbrough town centre. It was run and organised by local promotions company Ten Feet Tall alongside the local council, and was highly regarded as hosting many bands who rose to fame shortly afterwards. It was a free festival that ran from 2000 until 2010. It has attracted large crowds each year.

== Middlesbrough Music Live 2000–2011 ==
=== 2000 ===
Acts included Terrorvision. Eddi Reader, Pellethead, Kitachi, and Loon

=== 2001 ===
Acts included Shed Seven Murry The Hump, Crazy World Of Arthur Brown, Proud Mary, local folk heroes The Wildcats Of Kilkenny, and Space.

=== 2002 ===
Acts included Wheatus, The Cooper Temple Clause, Easyworld, Geno Washington, Dreadzone, Minuteman, James Yorkston & The Athletes, Graham Thornton, Six By Seven, The Crescent, The Burn, Radar Brothers, Longview, Aziz, Electronic Eye Machine, Fingathing, Airwaves, Mixologists, Fleapit, Utopia, Elba (band), and Fence Collective.

=== 2003 ===
Acts included Reef, The Darkness, Keane, Junior Senior, Biffy Clyro, and Oceansize.

=== 2004 ===
Acts included Razorlight, Kasabian, Ordinary Boys, Kaiser Chiefs, Bloc Party, Goldie Lookin Chain, The Eighties Matchbox B-line Disaster, Reuben, Electric Six, Kosheen, Dead 60s, Alistair Griffin, The Black Velvets, and Viking Skull.

=== 2005 ===
Acts included The Thrills, Editors, We Are Scientists, The Proclaimers, ¡Forward, Russia!, The Cribs, Nine Black Alps, The Paddingtons, Kubb, Estelle, Mostly Autumn, Queen Adreena, Towers Of London, Johnny Panic, Fastlane, The Departure, and Hurricane Party.

=== 2006 ===
Acts included Ocean Colour Scene, Paolo Nutini, The Pigeon Detectives, Little Man Tate, Larrikin Love, The Sunshine Underground, The Rumble Strips, Bromheads Jacket, Howling Bells, Morning Runner, The Modern, Zebrahead, XTN Skindred, Sign, Brigade, Chairmen Of The Bored, Hope Of The States, Vincent Vincent and the Villains, Jane Wails, Reverend and The Makers and Enter Shikari.

=== 2007 ===
Acts that played 3 June 2007 included; Tony Christie, The Twang, Dub Pistols featuring Terry Hall, Dykeenies, Drive by argument, The Envy Corps, Elliot Minor, Newton Faulkner, The Films, Shy Child, The Ghost of a Thousand, Good Shoes, The Hours, I was a Cub Scout, Kubichek!, Amy MacDonald, Lucky Soul, Malpractice, Mancini, Mayor McCA, Middleman, Miss Conduct, Nine Lives for Skydives, One Night Only, Pama International, Priestess (band), Ripcord, Steriogram, Tiny Dancers, To My Boy, We Start Fires, Yourcodenameis:Milo, Flood of Red

=== 2008 ===
Bands that played 1 June 2008, included:

Ash, Black Kids, The Infadels, You Me At Six, Outcry Collective, We Are The Ocean, The Bookhouse Boys, Beyond This Oath, One Night Only, Delays, Sam Isaac, Late Of The Pier, Noah And The Whale, Hijak Oscar, The Anomalies, Glamour Of The Kill, Nine Lives for Skydives, Natty, Parka, Slaves Of Gravity, Dan Le Sac vs Scroobius Pip, The Hot Melts, The Master Colony, Go Audio, The Lexingtons. Royworld

=== 2009 ===
Music Live 2009 was on 7 June with a warm up from 4–6 June.

The acts included The Zutons, The Sunshine Underground, Tommy Sparks, Dan Black, Master Shortie.

=== 2010 ===
Music Live 2010 took place on Sunday 6 June 2010, and saw an attendance of 60,000. The headliners were The Blackout and Millionaires, on the sumo stage, The Hoosiers and Example on the TFM Stage.

== INTRO Festival 2011 ==
The festival was renamed to INTRO Festival for 2011, and charged £15 for tickets. Headliners for 2011 were Example and Feeder. The festival had an attendance of 7,000.
