= The Glitterati =

- Origin: Leeds, England
- Genre: Hard rock
- Years active: 2003–2011
- Label: DR2 Records
- Members: Paul Gautrey; John Emsley; Billy James; Baz Morrison; Gaff Guit
- Past members: Jamie Snell; Nic Denson
- Website: Official site (not been updated since 4 October 2006)

The Glitterati were an English hard rock band, originally from Leeds, but primarily based in London, England during most of their career. The band were signed to Atlantic Records and later to DR2 Records/Global Music.

== Debut album ==
In 2004 the band released an EP called "Here Comes a Close Up". Limited to a certain number of copies, it was not eligible for the UK Singles Chart, but did manage to sell all its limited edition units.

The band released their debut album The Glitterati on 25 April 2005 on Atlantic Records The album was produced by Mike Clink, who previously worked with Guns N' Roses (on Appetite for Destruction and Use Your Illusion I and II) and Metallica. The album was completed in a recording studio in Los Angeles. This was followed by the extensive 'Back In Power' tour of the UK.

In early 2005, the band broke into the Top 40 of the UK Singles Chart with their single "You Got Nothing On Me". Their next single, "Heartbreaker", also entered the UK Top 40.

They were nominated in The Best New Band Category at the Kerrang Awards.

In 2005, the band also co-headlined the second Nokia 'New School of Rock' tour, together with The Black Velvets and Hurricane Party.

Over the summer of 2005, The Glitterati played at festivals in the United Kingdom such as T in the Park and Download Festival at Donington Park and The Leeds & Reading Festival.

They also toured with a number of varied acts throughout 2004-2006, including The Killers, The Wildhearts, Kings Of Leon, David Lee Roth, Jet, and The Vines, giving them more notoriety as a live band.

== Second album ==
In 2009, The Glitterati recorded their second album with the record producer, Matt Hyde (also known for his work with Gallows, Acroama, Trivium and Slipknot).

In September 2009, The Glitterati signed a worldwide record deal with DR2 Records/Global - a subdivision of Demolition Records. In November 2009, the band released "Fight Fight Fight" as a free download single.

In May 2010, the Glitterati released Are You One Of Us? to strong reviews in the UK music press, including a 4/5 album review in The Sun.

In June 2010, the band released the single, "Overnight Superstar".

On 11 April 2011, frontman Paul Gautrey announced that the band had decided to call it quits, following difficulties promoting and touring for the band's second album.

== Discography ==
=== EPs ===
- Here Comes A Close Up - (2004) (Atlantic)

=== Albums ===
- The Glitterati (2005, Atlantic) #128 UK
- Are You One of Us? (2010, DR2 Records)

=== Singles ===
Date	Song	UK Singles Chart	Album
2003	"Do You Love Yourself"	76	The Glitterati
2005	"You Got Nothing on Me"	36	The Glitterati
2005	"Heartbreaker"	38	The Glitterati
2005	"Back in Power"	42	The Glitterati
2009	"Fight Fight Fight"	-	Are You One of Us?
2009	"Overnight Superstar"	-	Are You One Of Us?

== Videography ==
- "Do You Love Yourself?"
- "You Got Nothing On Me"
- "Heartbreaker"
- "Back in Power"
- "Keep Me Up All Night"
- "Overnight Superstar"
