= The Black Velvets =

English rock band

- Origin: Liverpool, England
- Genres: Hard rock
- Years active: 2003–2007
- Label: Vertigo
- Members: Paul Carden; Robbie Ross; Dave Dutton; Nick Kilroe

The Black Velvets were a rock band from Liverpool, England. The band formed in 2003 and disbanded in August 2007 after releasing one album.

== History ==
The Black Velvets were formed in 2003 by guitarist Robbie Ross, drummer Nick Kilroe, and cousins Dave Dutton (bass guitar) and Paul Carden (vocals).

The band counted Liam Gallagher as a fan, and he was present when the band joined Vertigo Records, but refused to sign as a witness when the band signed their contract. They also signed with Sanctuary Management.

The band's debut single, "Get On Your Life" was released in November 2004.

In 2005, The Black Velvets co-headlined the second Nokia 'New School of Rock' tour, together with The Glitterati and Hurricane Party. 2005 saw the release of further singles: "3345" (which gave them their biggest chart hit, with a number 34 placing in the UK Singles Chart), "Glamstar", and "Once in a While", and also saw the release of the band's self-titled debut album.

To coincide with the album's release, the band played at The Cavern in Liverpool, where they were awarded the honour of their own signed brick in the wall of the club. Extensive touring followed. The band also played dates supporting The Who, Mötley Crüe, Mark Lanegan, Razorlight, and The Killers, and appeared at the Oxegen, T In The Park, Isle of Wight, Fuji Rock, Reading And Leeds, Glastonbury, Jersey Live, and Tennents ViTal festivals.

The band's eponymous album was produced by Mike Crossey. The band toured to promote this release, but subsequently parted ways with their management, and went on to perform new material live in 2006.

The Black Velvets' song "Fear and Loathing" appeared on the soundtrack to the 2005 combat-driven racing game Burnout Revenge as well as the PlayStation version of Burnout Legends. The song "Get on Your Life" was used in the TV series Sugar Rush and included on the associated soundtrack album.

After the band split up in 2007, Carden and Dutton performed in 'The Marvellous Medicine Band', as well as 'The Dave Dutton Blues Explosion'.

In 2013, Dave Dutton formed a new band called 'Kingdom'. Also in 2013, Paul Carden auditioned for The Voice UK, getting past the 'Blind Auditions' and into Danny O'Donoghue's team. As of 2021 Carden was recording under the name This Is War!

== Musical style ==
The band described their influences as, "Glam Punk Rock 'n' Roll", and their influences included Led Zeppelin, AC/DC and T. Rex.

Drummer Nick Kilroe described the band's sound in 2005 as, "Classic Rock 'n' Roll", going on to say that the band were looking for, "Another Oasis-style vibe". A live review from 2004 described the band as, "Obviously hugely influenced by the '70s, with each song boasting swaggering guitar riffs and drums that almost demanded to be stomped along to".

Carol Hodge of the BBC described the band as follows: "Imagine the lumping energy of Motörhead, the solid guitars of Jimmy Page and the prickly, note-perfect vocals of Roger Daltrey, bearded and wearing a corduroy trilby, and you’re close to The Black Velvets". Michaela Annot of Drowned in Sound webzine described the band's sound as, "Big, stomping boogie-woogie rock, with just enough glam for the girls". Another reviewer thought the band combined, "The dirty chug of primetime Slade and the throat-searing rasp of AC/DC".

== Members ==
- Paul Carden - vocals
- Nick Kilroe - drums
- Dave Dutton - bass guitar
- Robbie Ross - guitar

== Discography ==
=== Albums ===
- The Black Velvets (12 Sept. 2005, CD, Vertigo) - Parentheses indicate composer(s), according to album booklet:
1. "I Won't Lie Down" (Kilroe/Carden/Dutton) 3:21
2. "Get On Your Life" (Kilroe) 3:23
3. "Once In A While" (Kilroe) 2:57
4. "Not All The Time" (Dutton/Ross) 2:56
5. "3345" (Kilroe) 3:14
6. "Glamstar" (Kilroe) 2:47
7. "Lady Lime" (Kilroe/Dutton) 4:25
8. "You Won't Be Changing Me" (Kilroe) 3:08
9. "Save Me" (Carden) 2:51
10. "You're Not Giving It All" (Kilroe/Carden/Dutton/Ross) 4:03
11. "Fear And Loathing" (Kilroe/Carden) 2:52
12. "This Time Later" (Kilroe/Carden) 2:20

The last two songs were added to the Japanese "Summer School Of Rock '05" release of the album.

=== Singles ===
- "Get on Your Life" (2004, Vertigo)

CD: "Get on Your Life"/"Rude Boy"/"Fear and Loathing"
7" vinyl: "Get on Your Life"/"This Time Later"

- "3345" (2005, Vertigo) - UK #34

CD: "3345"/"Not All The Time"/"You're So Rock 'N' Roll"
7" vinyl: "3345"/"Soul Saviour"

- "Glamstar" (2005, Vertigo)

CD: "Glamstar"/"Sing My Melody"/"Close Your Eyes"
7" vinyl: "Glamstar"/"Good Times High"

- "Once in a While" (2005, Vertigo): - UK #75

CD: "Once in a While"/"Sing my Melody"/"Close Your Eyes"
7" vinyl: "Once in a While"/"Now Listen"
