= Turn Back Time (TV series) =

- Presented by: Dara Ó Briain
- Country of origin: United Kingdom
- No. of series: 1
- No. of episodes: 6

Production
- Running time: 30 minutes
- Production company: Hat Trick Productions

Original release
- Network: BBC One
- Release: 9 August – 13 September 2006

Turn Back Time (originally titled If I Could Turn Back Time) is a British television series produced by Hat Trick Productions for BBC One. It aired from 9 August to 13 September 2006, and was hosted by Dara Ó Briain. In the show, famous faces revealed what they regret doing, and not doing, in their life.

Ó Briain explained: "The series is a bit like This Is Your Life, but hosted by the Wizard of Oz, given that all my guests tell me the terrible things they wish they'd done differently - and then I say 'No! But you've been brave all along... ' - and I give them a medal. My guests express deep felt regrets about their lives and then we race to see who can mock them first. Sometimes I win, sometimes the guest wins, either way they get the mickey taken out of them." He continued, "Turn Back Time is basically a chat show, but where the host is really well armed. I had a lot of bullets in my gun. But that's OK. I had a bunch of flowers up my sleeve too."

== Episode guide ==
Guest	Air date	Regrets
Terry Jones	9 August 2006	Kissing bearded men, knowing how to cook like a lady
Vic Reeves	16 August 2006	Spending time in Bible class, not becoming a zookeeper, buying a yacht
Barry Humphries	23 August 2006	Being on Australia's stamps, not giving Les Patterson enough stage time
Johnny Vegas	30 August 2006	Stealing as a child, wanting to be a breakdancer, his early television appearances, saying Sir Cliff Richard had just committed suicide on live television
Ruby Wax	6 September 2006	Not pursuing a career as classical actress
Phill Jupitus	13 September 2006	His time in a private school in Ipswich, a gig he did at the Royal Albert Hall, not being in a rock band, becoming fat
