= Norden Farm Centre for the Arts =

- Interactive map of Norden Farm Centre for the Arts
- Address: Altwood Road; Maidenhead; United Kingdom
- Coordinates: 51.51542°N 0.746087°W
- Owner: Norden Farm Centre Trust
- Capacity: 225 theatre, 100 studio, 80 long barn
- Designation: Listed Building Grade II

Construction
- Opened: September 2000

Website
- nordenfarm.org

Norden Farm Centre for the Arts is a multi form arts centre located in Maidenhead, Berkshire, England providing a 225-seat theatre and 100-seat studio space. Following calls for an arts centre in Maidenhead since the 1970s, Norden Farm eventually opened in September 2000.

Under the direction of Annabel Turpin, the art centre built up an outstanding reputation within the South of England, with a number of top professionals from the worlds of theatre, spoken word, cabaret, comedy, jazz, classical music and literature performing there. Annabel moved in May 2008 to ARC, Stockton Arts Centre, on Teesside. Jane Corry, previously producer of the People Show, one of the UK's longest running theatre companies joined Norden Farm in December 2008 and continues to develop the programme.

== History ==
In 1992 an opportunity arose to consider part of the Norden Farm estate, sought for redevelopment. The site offered listed buildings together with a quality ambiance suited to creative activity, an opportunity to preserve part of Maidenhead's heritage and close proximity to the heart of the community which would enable use of the facility to be maximised. A trust with Registered Charity status, Norden Farm Centre Trust, was established to manage the project. In autumn 1994 the National Lottery commenced and Norden Farm Centre Trust applied to the Arts Council for lottery funding to complete Norden Farm.

Following an intensive and detailed design and public consultation phase, planning approval was granted in September 1994. The Arts Council carried out a full assessment during 1997, prior to an announcement of support and approval for the finished scheme in January 1998. The final design stage of the project was completed in 1998 and Norden Farm Centre for the Arts finally opened its doors on 17 September 2000.

The total project cost was £9 million. The National Lottery awarded £5,295,000 for the capital project plus £492,000 for the initial land purchase. The balance was raised from local authority funding, Foundation for Sports and the Arts, and local fundraising from companies and individuals.

When the centre opened, Norden Farm had a courtyard theatre (seating 225), studio theatre (seating 100), meeting rooms in the Georgian farm house, art gallery, eighteenth century long barn (workshop/meeting space), a media suite, and bar cafe area.

In 2011, the Arts Council announced that it was not renewing its core funding of £143,000 per year which it had given since the opening. After a review of the challenge facing the centre, Maidenhead Council announced in December 2012 support of £100,000 per year for four years. The centre also encourages regular support from the community by 'angels' and 'patrons'.

== Design and construction ==
The site retains two original, listed buildings associated with its architectural roots: a Georgian farmhouse, now used mostly as offices, and an 18th-century barn, now used as a flexible events space. The main theatre was constructed below ground-level, within a purpose-built wing attached to the other sections.

The centre was built with a desire that the building itself would "express the transformative power of the arts"; its founding director was quoted: "We wanted a building that would excite and intrigue and artworks that were integrated into the fabric of the Centre." Thus specific Arts Council funding was awarded, enabling four artists to be recruited. Their resulting work, 'Deep Theatre', was a multimedia collaboration, relaying CCTV images from across the site onto a projection screen at the bottom of the stairs leading down to the auditorium.

In tandem, artist Liza Gough Daniels produced two connected works: 'Poured Wall', an abstract red and white painting in the centre's bar area, and 'Curved Landscape'.

In 2013, with a further Arts Council grant, Norden Farm commissioned a new external sculpture outside the Long Barn. Trevor Leat's living willow work, 'Family Circle', provides an enticing focal-point for passing traffic along Altwood Road.

== Activities ==
In 2005 the centre started a series of sell out monthly cabaret nights in its smaller studio space, with a number of well known West End performers being booked.

Norden Farm has a number of resident companies including 1157, which aims to produce "unique, daring and controversial" work as well as Troublemaker Theatre Company, who run the Norden Lights youth theatre. It hosts the annual Shakespeare As You Like It (SHAYLI) event, at which primary schools create and perform drama inspired by Shakespeare's work.

It also offers venues for hire for companies, product launches, seminars etc. including the 18th century Long Barn, rooms in the farmhouses, and the main theatre and studio. The Farm Out programme for primary and secondary school children host a number of educational initiatives.

Up to 2,500 people a week visit the centre for a variety of live shows, films, classes and workshops.

== Solar Panels ==
The centre has a MaidEnergy Coop Community owned solar panel installation, producing lower carbon power at a discount price compared to power from the network.
