= Wolves and Thieves =

Studio album by Goldheart Assembly
- Released: 8 March 2010 (digital download)
- Genre: Indie folk, indie pop, folk rock
- Length: 50:49
- Label: Fierce Panda

Wolves and Thieves is the first studio album by Goldheart Assembly, released as digital download on 8 March 2010 and on 15 March as a physical release. The first single from the album was "King of Rome".

== Track listing ==
1. King of Rome (4:05)
2. Anvil (3:20)
3. Last Decade (5:02)
4. Hope Hung High (3:31)
5. So Long St. Christopher (4:18)
6. Engraver's Daughter (5:51)
7. Jesus Wheel (4:54)
8. Reminder (2:31)
9. Under the Waterway (3:42)
10. Interlude (0:52)
11. Carnival 4 (The Carrying Song) (8:36)
12. Boulevards (4:04)
13. Oh Really (iTunes Bonus track)
