= Mono Club =

English indie rock band

- Origin: London, England
- Genres: Indie pop, indie rock, indie folk psychedelic rock
- Years active: 2016 – present
- Labels: LGM Records
- Members: John Herbert; Jake Bowser; Lyla Foy; Dan Bell; Nicky Francis; Kyle Hall
- Website: monoclub.co.uk

Mono Club is an English indie rock band from London, England. It is a musical collaboration between members of Goldheart Assembly and Lyla Foy. Their music has been described as 1960s psych and indie-pop. The Beatles and David Bowie are among their influences.

== 2018: Sky High and Submarine ==
On 23 March 2018, they released their debut album, Sky High and Submarine on LGM Records. The album comprises ten songs, including singles Sky High and Submarine, Memory Critical and Best Laid Plans.

== Members ==
Mono Club are:

- John Herbert: lead vocals, guitar.
- Jake Bowser: keyboards, bass.
- Lyla Foy: backing vocals, bass.
- Dan Bell: rhythm guitar, backing vocals.
- Nicky Francis: drums.
- Kyle Hall: guitar.

== Discography ==
Albums

- Sky High and Submarine (March 2018) LGM Records
