= Brendon Burns (comedian) =

Australian comedian

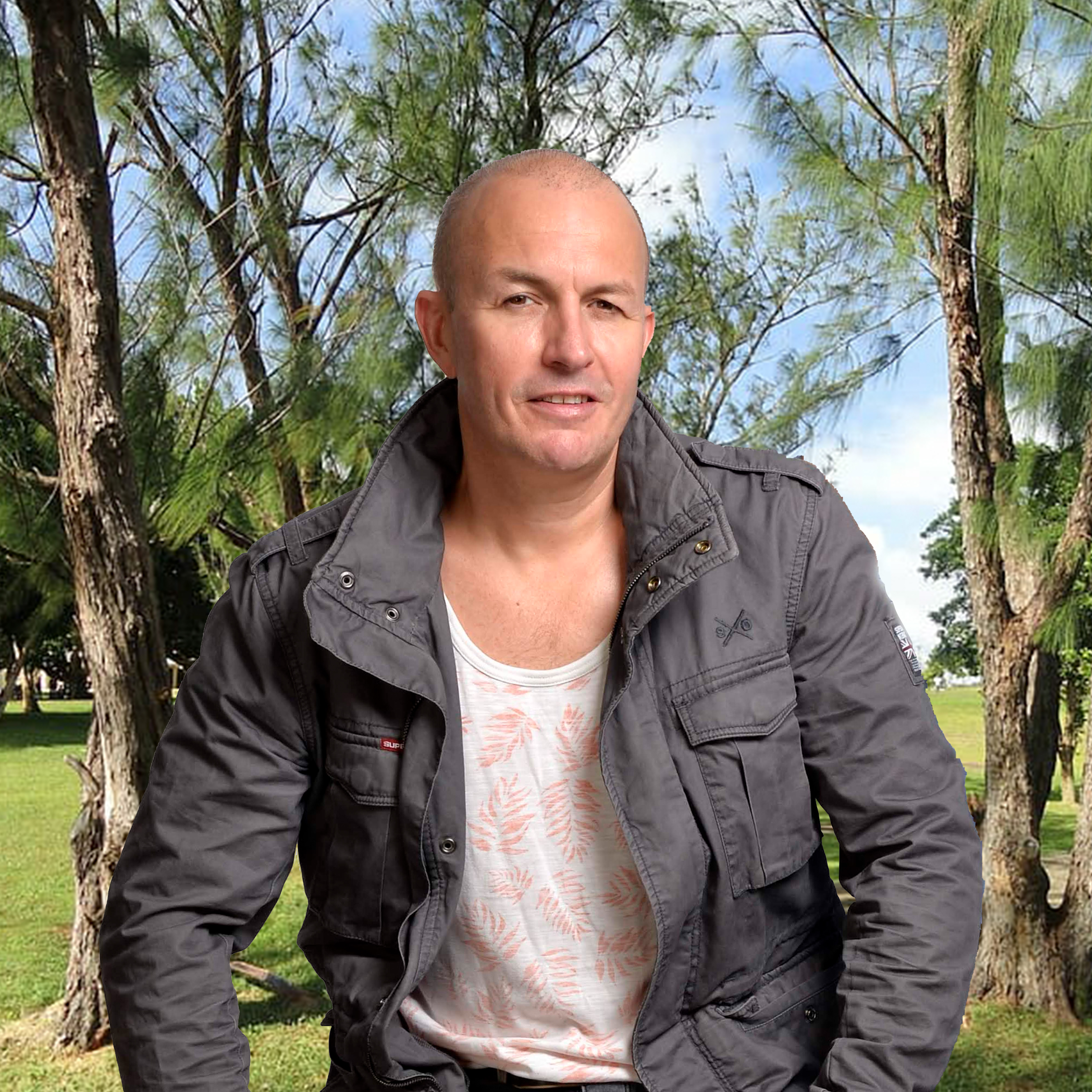
Burns in 2020

Brendon Burns (born 19 April 1971) is an Australian stand-up comedian and author who mostly performs in the United Kingdom. He is known for his aggressive stage performance and offensive material.

== Career ==
Burns' television career began as a performer on Channel 4's late-night spontaneous comedy show The 11 O'Clock Show. He has subsequently appeared as a presenter on the ITV show I'm a Celebrity...Get Me Out of Here! Now!, walking off after just three shows. Furthermore, he was the conductor of masterclasses in stand-up (again on ITV). He has also appeared on ITV2's Comedy Cuts.

He has also performed at Montreal and South African comedy festivals.

He first appeared at the Edinburgh Festival Fringe in 1996, hosting The Comedy Zone showcase of new acts, and performing in his debut solo show 6pm Time To Get Up For Work. He has returned to the Fringe every year since, except for 1999, and in 2007, won its top prize, the if.comedy award for his show So I Suppose THIS Is Offensive Now. Also at the 2007 Fringe, Burns appeared alongside Adam Hills and Sammy J in a stage version of Breaker Morant by The Comedians' Theatre Company directed by Phil Nichol. A trilogy, Burnsy versus Brendon, which ran at Edinburgh in 2004, 2005 and 2006, examined his own life.

On 24 June 2010, he appeared as a guest on the comedy talk-show, The Green Room with Paul Provenza.

Burns released his first semi-autobiographical novel, Fear of Hat Loss in Las Vegas with Transworld publishing in August 2010.

In April 2013, he released his first US comedy album, Pompously Lectures Americans, on Stand Up Records.

In 2014, Burns launched the Dumb White Guy podcast (originally titled The Brendon Burns Show). Initially, Burns used the podcast to voice his opinions on the UK comedy scene and play clips from his recent gigs but eventually it would develop into a travelogue-style show and featured interviews with fellow comedians. The podcast concluded in 2019.

In 2019, Burns had a cameo role as a ring announcer in the wrestling film Fighting with My Family.

=== Live recordings ===
- Buckets and Sulphur (CD)
- Mispent Childhood (CD)
- Not for Everyone (CD)
- Brendon vs Burnsy (CD and Vinyl)
- All My Love All My Rage (CD)
- Sober not Clean (CD and DVD are different shows)
- So I suppose THIS is offensive now (DVD)
- The Thinking Man's Idiot (CD)
- You Know, Love n God n Metaphysics n Shit (Digital Download and DVD)
- Selfies in the Grand Canyon (Streaming on NextUp Comedy)
