= Long Distance Song Effects =

Studio album by Goldheart Assembly
- Released: 1 July 2013
- Recorded: 2012
- Genre: Rock/pop
- Length: 49:11
- Label: EMI
- Producer: Goldheart Assembly / Tobi Gmur

Goldheart Assembly chronology
Wolves and Thieves (2010)	Long Distance Song Effects (2013)

Long Distance Song Effects is the second studio album by Goldheart Assembly, released on 1 July 2013 by EMI / New Music Club.

== Background ==
The band started working on their second album, Long Distance Song Effects, in 2011. Twenty-five tracks initially recorded in London were gradually whittled down during trips back and forth to Lucerne where they recorded with Swiss musician Tobi Gmür, who they had met on an earlier European tour.

In an interview with Gigsultz magazine, John Herbert spoke of the band's love of Lucerne and Switzerland: "We fell in love with the city and the people. We kept going back whenever we could even though our manager wanted us to mix it in London."

James Dale also commented “We met a guy on our European tour who had a studio and he asked if we wanted to come in the day after. So we got up early – the earliest we’ve ever got up – and he liked the vibe so we came back two weeks later and started recording. Stunning surroundings certainly played a part in the album’s content, especially the experience of writing over a distance, being away from home and people putting complete faith in our music”.

== Release ==
Long Distance Song Effects was released in the UK on 1 July 2013 by EMI / New Music Club. The Allmusic journalist, Heather Phares, noted that "the control and variety they display throughout Long Distance Song Effects shows that Goldheart Assembly have come into their own here".

== Critical reception ==
Long Distance Song Effects received positive reviews from the UK press, with publications such as The Guardian, Metro, Allmusic and NME all awarding the album 4-star reviews.
