= Pete Heat =

Magician and television personality in the UK

- Born: Peter Mark Hathway; 17 January 1983
- Occupation: Magician
- Website: http://www.peteheat.co.uk

Pete Heat (born Pete Hathway; 17 January 1983) is a UK-based magician and television personality.

== Career ==
Heat starred in the TV shows Around The World In 80 Tricks (Insight, 2016), Secrets Of The Brain (Insight, 2016) and Magic Party (BBC2NI, 2008).

He has also appeared at the Edinburgh Fringe with two shows, "The Magical Adventures Of Pete Heat" and "Miracles Etc".

He is a regular performer in The Magicians Table in London.
