= Ian Smith (comedian) =

English comedian

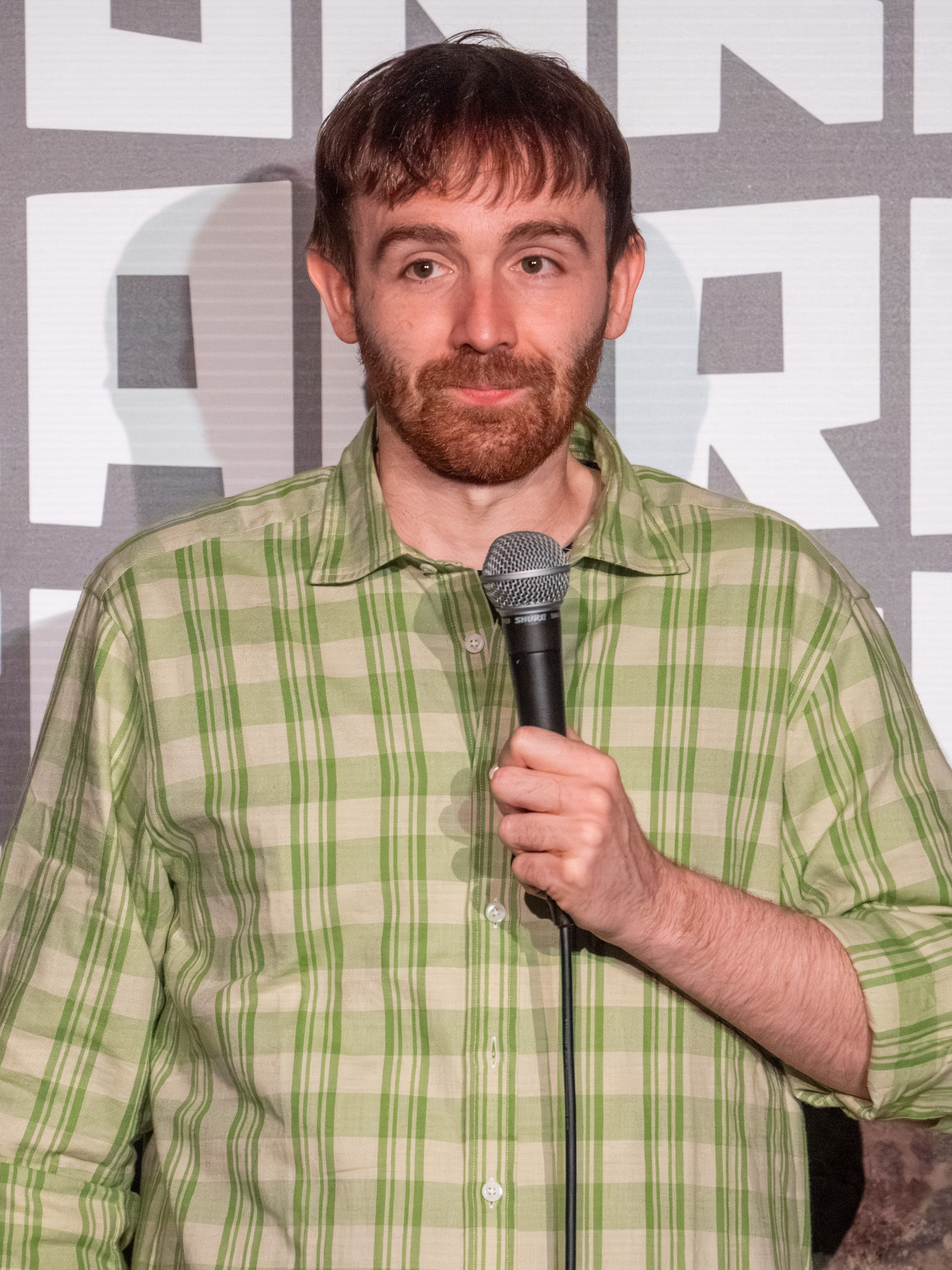
- Smith in 2025
- Born: 13 September 1988 (age 38); Goole, Humberside, England
- Occupations: Comedian, actor
- Website: Official website

Ian Smith (born 13 September 1988) is an English stand-up comedian and actor, best known for his role on the BBC's The Ark and co-presenter on Dave's The Magic Sponge.

== Career ==
Smith started his acting career with appearances in all six episodes of Popatron, a sitcom produced by Charlie Brooker's Zeppotron for BBC Two as part of its BBC Switch brand. His largest acting role to date came in BBC One's 2015 TV film The Ark, starring as Ham, the son of David Threlfall's Noah.

Alongside fellow comedian Rob Beckett and former footballer Jimmy Bullard, Smith hosted UK television channel Dave's comedy-football podcast The Magic Sponge. Since 2023 he is co-host on the Northern News podcast with Amy Gledhill.

As a stand-up comedian, Smith has taken several shows to the Edinburgh Fringe. He has twice been nominated for the Edinburgh Comedy Award for Best Show for Crushing (2023) and Foot Spa Half Empty (2025).

== Filmography ==
- 8 out of 10 Cats does Countdown (2025) - Himself
- Siblings (2016) – Pizza Guy
- The Ark (2015) – Ham
- Give Out Girls (2014) – Joe
- The Syndicate (2012) – Wayne
- Popatron (2010) – Sam
