= Roadstar =

British rock band (2002-2007)

- Origin: England and Wales
- Genres: Hard rock, heavy metal
- Years active: 2002–2007
- Labels: JVC (Japan); Magic Hat Records(UK)
- Spinoffs: Heaven's Basement
- Past members: Jonny Rocker; Rob Randell; Chris Rivers; Richie Hevanz; Robin "Kreepy" Hirschfeld; Steve Pipe; Cherry

Roadstar was a British rock band formed in 2002. The group originally went under the name Hurricane Party and disbanded in April 2007. A year later several of the members, together with Sid Glover, formed Heaven's Basement. In 2016, former band member Richie Hevanz became frontman of Fragile Things, following a short stint in a band called Endless Mile. In July 2021, Hevanz became the frontman for Misery's Smile.

== History ==
=== As Hurricane Party (2002–2004) ===
Formed as Hurricane Party in 2002 by guitarist Jonny Rocker and manager Laurie Mansworth (who met in a guitar shop where Rocker worked), the band soon recruited Rob Randell (who had previously played with Rocker) and the rest of the bandmembers through adverts. The members bonded by taking influences from the same 1970s heavy metal and hard rock acts, such as Led Zeppelin, Aerosmith and Deep Purple.

On 9 November 2002, the band supported Paul Di'Anno's Killers and Zodiac Mindwarp and the Love Reaction in a gig at Camden Underworld.

On 10 July 2003, original vocalist Steve Pipe played his last gig as part of the band, in London. He later went on to front an outfit named Carmen Pimps, and in 2012 he took part in the ITV1 television programme Superstar.

Following Pipe's departure, Hurricane Party briefly added a new vocalist named Cherry, though this reportedly did not last long.

In October 2003, Richie Hevanz joined the band as the new frontman, and played his first gig at JB's in Dudley.

The band were discovered and signed by A&R man John Kalodner (who had previously worked with Aerosmith & Whitesnake) in 2004. Together they put out their debut release, an EP called Get This, later that year.

In 2005, the band co-headlined the second Nokia 'New School of Rock' tour, together with The Glitterati and The Black Velvets.

After a series of strong hurricanes in the United States, resulting in the devastating Hurricane Katrina, the UK rockers chose to change their name to Roadstar.

=== As Roadstar (2004–2007) ===
Roadstar toured alongside a number of high-profile acts, such as Alice Cooper, Deep Purple, Thunder, Status Quo, Meat Loaf, Nickelback and The Darkness. They also took part in major rock events such as Download Festival in 2004 and Monsters of Rock in 2006.

Their debut full-length album Grand Hotel, produced by Kevin Shirley (Led Zeppelin and Aerosmith), was released in 2006. As part of the promotion for the album, Roadstar toured with fellow hard rockers The Answer on a co-headlining tour, with 23 shows in 200 days, from 4 October to 1 November. 'Kreepy' left the band for personal reasons just before the start of this tour, and Sid Glover was invited to step in.

Roadstar won the 'Best Newcomers' award at the 2006 Classic Rock Magazine Awards, beating the Australian band Wolfmother. Their second album Glass Mountain was released on 16 April 2007.

On 24 April 2007 the band released a statement that they were splitting up and moving onto new projects. Although no reason was given, the band claimed to no longer have access to their MySpace account. Rumours began circulating that the split was due to disagreements between the band and record label Magic Hat Records over advertising and press coverage for the album Glass Mountain. Both Grand Hotel and Glass Mountain remained on sale despite the split.

The following report was issued on the Classic Rock magazine website:

It seems that Roadstar (as we know them) are no more. Details are still quite vague, but the band have parted company with Laurie Mansworth, the former More/Airrace guitarist who for the past seven years has managed them and co-written much of their material. From what Laurie told Dave Ling, the winners of Classic Rock's Best New Band award plan to continue under a new name, but minus the benefit of his expertise. After seven years of tutelage, Mansworth is understandably choked by this decision, though resolute not to sling any mud. Coming just weeks after the release of their second album, 'Glass Mountain', the timing of the split is pretty astonishing.

== Band members ==
- Jonny Rocker – guitar (2002–2007)
- Rob Randell – bass (2002–2007)
- Chris Rivers – drums (2002–2007)
- Richie Hevanz – vocals (2003–2007)
- Robin "Kreepy" Hirschfeld – guitar (2003–2006)
- Steve Pipe – vocals (2002–2003)
- Cherry – vocals (2003, but did not play any shows)

== Discography ==
=== Albums ===
- Grand Hotel – (2006)
- Glass Mountain – (2007)

=== EP ===
- Get This (EP) (as Hurricane Party) – (2004)
