= Wychwood Festival =

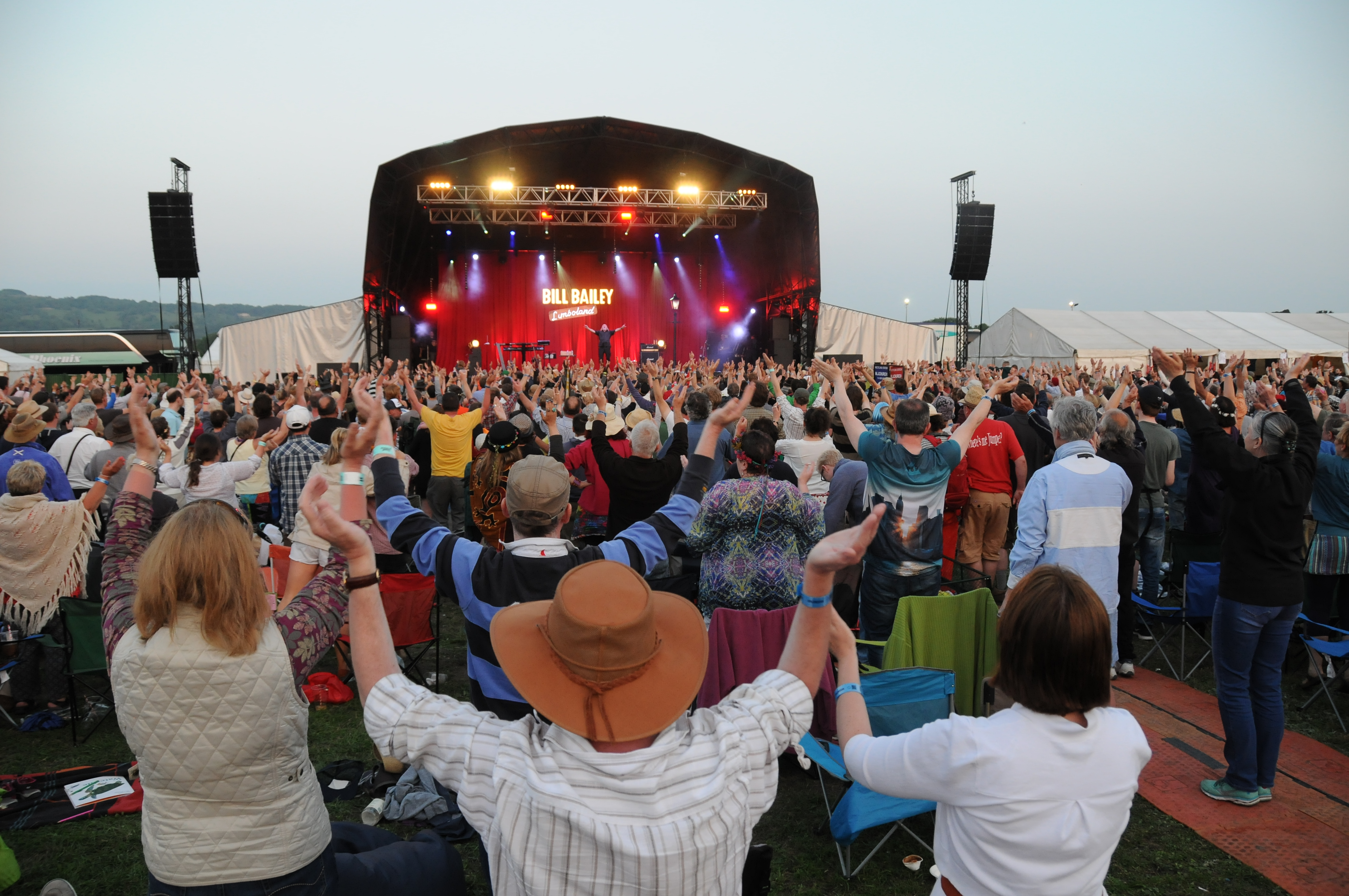
- Bill Bailey performing at Wychwood Festival 2016
- Genre: Family Music Festival
- Location: Cheltenham Racecourse
- Years active: 2005–present
- Founders: Graeme Merifield and Sam Shrouder
- Website: www.wychwoodfestival.com

Wychwood Festival is an annual music festival held at Cheltenham racecourse in Gloucestershire, UK. As well as music, the family-friendly three-day festival includes workshops, comedy, the Children's Literature Festival, and a Headphone Disco. The festival consists of four stages and has hosted performances from artists such as; The Boomtown Rats; The Proclaimers; Bill Bailey; UB40's Ali Campbell, Astro and Mickey Virtue reunited; The Levellers; Newton Faulkner; Craig Charles; 10cc; The Waterboys; Duffy; Supergrass; The Stranglers; and The Human League.

This festival is sponsored by Wychwood Brewery (home to the Hobgoblin brand) and works in association with the University of Gloucestershire, who program and run the Wychwood FM Radio Station (in partnership with Tone Radio) and the acoustic Wychwood FM Stage. The festival also hosts the Children's Literature Festival (in association with Waterstones) and also works in partnership with the children's charity Toybox.

The festival has been described as “Britain’s most popular family festival”, by the Sunday Mirror, and as "an excellent hybrid of The Big Chill, WOMAD and The Cambridge Folk Festival." by Time Out magazine. The festival has also been called a "bijou Glastonbury". and a “safe, fun place to take the family but also rock ‘n’ roll enough for the most hardened of music fans”.

== History ==
The festival began in 2005, and features mostly indie, folk and world music. The festival is known for its family friendly feel, big range of music on offer, plus a lot of other activities including workshops for all ages, comedy, cinema and much more. It has been nominated Best Family Festival in the UK Festival Awards every year.

The 2026 festival marked its 20th anniversary and was extended to four days for the first time, taking place from 28 to 31 May at Cheltenham Racecourse. The festival featured headliners including Kaiser Chiefs, Levellers and Craig David, alongside comedy and family activities.
