= Department of Biology, University of Oxford =

Department of University of Oxford

Department of Biology
- Formation: 2022
- Merger of: Department of Zoology; Department of Plant Sciences
- Headquarters: Department of Biology, Life and Mind Building, South Parks Road
- Head of Department: Prof. Martin Maiden
- Parent organization: University of Oxford
- Website: www.biology.ox.ac.uk

The Department of Biology is an academic department at the Mathematical, Physical and Life Sciences Division at the University of Oxford in Oxford, England, United Kingdom. It was formed following the 1 August 2022 merger between the Department of Plant Sciences and the Department of Zoology.

The department is now in the Life and Mind Building on South Parks Road, Oxford. It also has a field station, The John Krebs Field Station, based in Wytham.

== Overview ==
The Department's research spans levels from molecules to ecosystems in order to address fundamental questions relating to food security, plant molecular biology, disease biology, evolutionary mechanisms, conservation biology, biodiversity, evolutionary developmental biology, climate change and animal behaviour. This department also delivers the teaching of an undergraduate MBiol degree in biology. Within its research portfolio, the department incorporates several research institutes such as the Edward Grey Institute of Field Ornithology (EGI), the Wildlife Conservation Research Unit (WildCRU); as well as housing the Oxford University Herbaria. Several members of academic staff work within the Peter Medawar Building for Pathogen Research and were involved in addressing the COVID-19 pandemic.

Additional partnerships and resources of the Department include the Oxford University Museum of Natural History, the Oxford Botanic Garden and Arboretum, the John Krebs Field Station and Wytham Woods.

== Research themes ==
Research at the Department of Biology is grouped into five broad and cross-cutting themes:

- Behaviour & Biomechanics
- Ecology & Conservation
- Evolutionary Biology
- Microbiology & Infectious Disease
- Molecular Plant Biology

== Notable staff ==
The following people of note are or have been associated with the Department:

- Roy M. Anderson
- Timothy Coulson (Former Head of Department)
- Richard Dawkins
- Liam Dolan
- Charles Elton
- E S Goodrich
- Sunetra Gupta
- John Gurdon
- Bill Hamilton
- Nicholas Harberd
- Sir Alistair Hardy
- Paul Harvey (Former Head of Department)
- Steven A. Hill
- Peter Holland (Former Head of Department)
- John Krebs
- David Lack
- Jane A. Langdale
- Sir E Ray Lankester
- Chris J. Leaver
- Bob May
- Angela McLean
- E.J. Milner-Gulland (Former Head of Department)
- Desmond Morris
- Chris Perrins
- John Pringle
- Ben Sheldon (Former Head of Department)
- Sir Richard Southwood
- Niko Tinbergen
- Katherine Willis, Baroness Willis of Summertown

== History ==
The Department of Biology was formed from the merging of the former Departments of Plant Sciences and Zoology on the 1 August 2022.

The former Department of Zoology, founded in 1860, was housed in the Tinbergen Building until it was demolished in Spring 2022. Designed in 1965 by Sir Leslie Martin (who also designed the Royal Festival Hall) and opened in 1971, the Tinbergen Building was a large Modernist building housing over 1,600 staff and students. It was Oxford University's largest building at the time. In February 2017, university officials announced that the Tinbergen Building would be closed for two years and all research and teaching activities of the Department would be moved elsewhere. This was due to the discovery of more asbestos than had been previously known; too much than could be removed during necessary maintenance with the building remaining occupied.

The former Department of Plant Sciences was formed from the Imperial Forestry Institute. The 'Imperial Forestry Institute' was formed from in 1924,; later it became the Commonwealth Forestry Institute from 1939. The Oxford Forestry Institute was incorporated and became the Department of Plant Sciences in 2002.

In January 2021, the Oxford City Council approved the £200m construction of the Life and Mind Building, which will be the university's largest building project and house the Departments of Experimental Psychology and Biology. It will replace the Tinbergen Building on South Parks Road. The building will feature multiple laboratories, teaching and testing spaces providing research facilities for 800 students and 1200 researchers. Work started in 2021, and the Life and Mind Building opened on 15 October 2025.

=== The John Krebs Field Station ===
The John Krebs Field Station is the official Field Station of the Department of Biology at the University of Oxford. Situated just outside Oxford near the village of Wytham, research at the Field Station primarily focuses on animal behaviour, physiology and biomechanics. The site was donated to the University of Oxford in 1942 by Raymond and Hope ffennell, as part of a substantial bequest including Wytham Woods.

The John Krebs Field Station at Wytham.

The John Krebs Field Station is one of the world's leading centres for experimental biology at landscape scale, where controlled laboratory experiments and natural field studies have been integrated for over four decades to address fundamental questions in behaviour, cognition, biomechanics, physiology and animal welfare.

Key academic staff that have conduced research at the Field Station include Lord John Krebs FRS, Prof. Chris Perrins FRS, Prof. Marian Dawkins FRS CBE, Prof. Ben Sheldon FRS, Prof. Alex Kacelnik FRS, Prof. David Macdonald CBE, Prof. Nicola Clayton, Prof. Graham Taylor, Prof. Innes Cuthill, Prof. Dora Biro, Prof. Tim Guilford and the Field Stations current Director, Dr Steve Portugal. Publications arising from the research at the Field Station have contributed significantly to their respective fields, including major papers regarding behavioural ecology and optimal foraging, cognition, tool use and animal intelligence, collective behaviour, navigation and sensory ecology, biomechanics and movement, and physiology and animal welfare. Such works were published in influential journals such as Nature, Science, PNAS, Current Biology, and PLoS Biology.
