= Monica Turner (ornithologist) =

English ornithologist

- Born: Monica Betts; 1925; Nuneaton, Warwickshire, England
- Died: 9 October 2013 (aged 87 or 88); Oxford, England
- Occupation: Ornithologist
- Known for: First British woman to acquire a doctorate

Monica Turner (1925 – 9 October 2013) was an English ornithologist who was the first woman ornithologist to acquire a doctorate in Britain, in 1952. She published under her maiden name Monica Betts. Her thesis was entitled The Availability of Food and Predation by the Genus Parus and examined bird populations in the woods in Wytham Woods near Oxford and the Forest of Dean in Gloucestershire, under the guidance of David Lack.

== Biography ==
Monica Turner was born Monica Betts, in Nuneaton, Warwickshire in 1925. She had a love of birds and the countryside from a young age. She studied zoology at the University College London before joining the Edward Grey Institute, where she researched under David Lack. She was initially a field assistant for Peter Hartley and then obtained a grant from the Agriculture Research Council for her own research. After her doctorate, she worked on a project funded by the Nature Conservancy with John Gibb.

Monica married Geoffrey Turner in 1957 and lived in Cumnor, near Oxford. Geoffrey died in 1984. They have two children, Jonathan and Jessica, and also two grandchildren.

Turner was a great contributor to village life and was a member of Cumnor Parish Council. She also had a great love of Norwich Terriers. She died in Oxford in 2013, aged 88.

== Education ==
As an undergraduate student Turner read Zoology at University College London. The university had been re-located to Bangor during the war, and being on the doorstep of Snowdonia National Park appealed, though the final year of her study was completed back in London. She obtained a first class degree.

Upon completion of her undergraduate study, she immediately joined the Edward Grey Institute as Peter Hartley's field assistant.

== Career ==
Turner joined the Edward Grey Institute of Field Ornithology, Oxford in 1948 to conduct research on the foraging behaviour of great tits and blue tits. She was one of the first doctoral students to join the institute after the war, and also one of the first female students. She soon obtained a five-year grant from the Agriculture Research Council and this resulted in her thesis.

An understanding of great tit behaviour was thought to be of potential importance in controlling caterpillar populations that were reducing timber production. Her thesis results showed that great tits actually captured a tiny proportion of the caterpillar population, amongst other things.

As an early research scientist she was one of few women in a male dominated department. However she went on to have a long academic career and conducted further post-doctoral studies on tits, obtaining a second five-year grant from the Agricultural Research Council. Turner then worked on the Nature Conservancy funded Breckland Research Project with John Gibb on tits and their prey in the Breckland pine woods in the east of England.
