= Elizabeth Lack =

British ornithologist

- Born: Elizabeth Silva; June 1916; Hertfordshire, England
- Died: 31 July 2015 (aged 99); Boars Hill, England
- Occupation: Ornithologist
- Known for: A Dictionary of Birds
- Spouse: David Lack
- Children: 4

Elizabeth Lack (June 1916 – 31 July, 2015) was a British ornithologist and researcher, best known for her contributions to the massive reference book A Dictionary of Birds.

== Biography ==
Born Elizabeth Silva in June 1916 in Hertfordshire, England, her father was starch manufacturer, Jack Silva of Kent. She grew passionate about birds and nature while she was still a young girl. She also had parallel interests in violin and piano and studied at the Royal Academy of Music in London, but the start of World War II brought a premature end to her attendance there. As a young woman in wartime, she served with numerous other Allied female recruits in the Auxiliary Territorial Service in England and France, maintaining and driving ambulances in Europe.

=== Post-war life ===
With the end of the war, she applied for employment at the Edward Gray Institute of Field Ornithology at the University of Oxford. When her resume reached Richard Fitter, he passed it on the institute's new director, the prominent ornithologist David Lack, who was seeking a secretary. When Lack received Elizabeth's resume, Fitter had attached a note: "Here's another for your reject file", but Lack interviewed and hired Elizabeth Silva for the position, effective January 1, 1946, and then, noting her passion for birds, invited her to become a part-time field assistant, helping him perform observations in Wytham Woods, located northwest of Oxford.

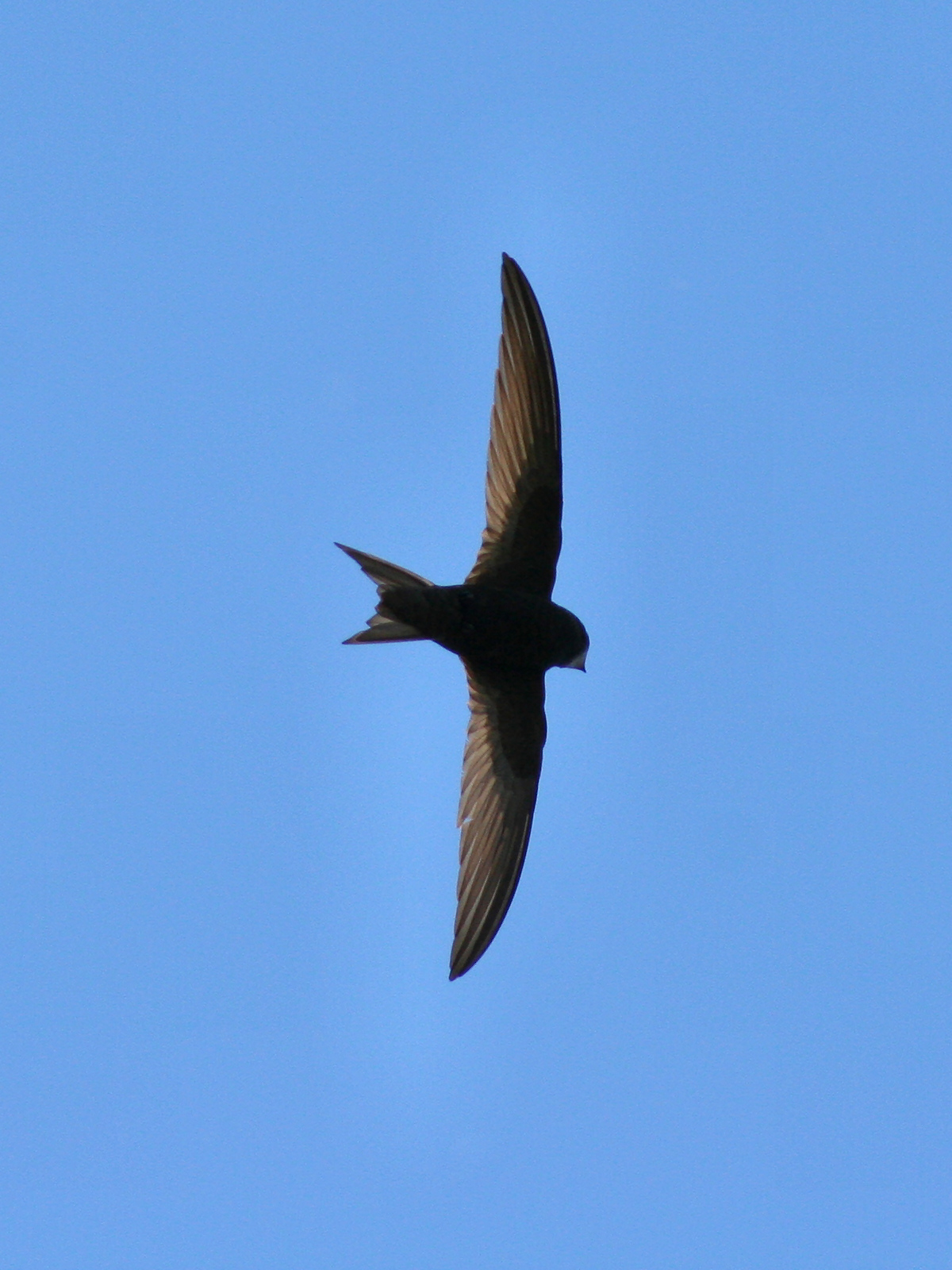
Common Swift (Apus apus) in flight.

Elizabeth started off monitoring nests of European robins and tits in Wytham Wood as well as European swifts breeding in the tower of the Oxford University Museum. According to the museum, the tower's colony of swifts has been part of research studies since May 1948 and is "one of the longest continuous studies of a single bird species in the world, and has contributed much to our knowledge of the swift."

In 1948, Elizabeth and David announced their engagement and married on July 9, 1949, taking their honeymoon trip to the Norfolk coast. They had four children: Peter Lack (born 1952, a biologist), Andrew Lack (born 1953, also a biologist and academic), Paul Lack (born 1957, a freelance teacher), and Catherine Lack (born 1959, a university chaplain).

=== Research ===
After her marriage and changing her name to Elizabeth Lack, she continued her research, travelling to the French Pyrenees with her husband at least twice to study the birds and insects that migrated southward toward Spain, through high mountain passes. Elizabeth published several papers about their observations, which have been called "pioneering discoveries".

David Lack died of cancer at age 62 in March 1973 with his final book unfinished. Elizabeth and son Peter Lack (aided by James Monk) completed the book and supervised its printing, Island Biology, Illustrated by the Landbirds of Jamaica (University of California Press, 1976).

Elizabeth Lack is widely credited for her "prodigious amount of work" to produce the "massive and authoritative" A Dictionary of Birds compiled for the British Ornithologists' Union with co-editor Bruce Campbell, for which she was awarded an honorary life membership in that organization. In the preface of the tome of more than 800,000 words, Frances James, then president of the American Ornithologists' Union claims it is important for all bird lovers. "For students, it will serve as an entrance to the present status of the field. For scientists it will serve as a research tool and a bridge between disciplines."

=== Later years ===
In Oxford, the Lacks lived in a flat in Park Town, and later on Boars Hill, just south of the city. Elizabeth Lack died there on 31 July 2015 at age 99.

== Selected publications ==
- Lack, Elizabeth (1950). "Breeding season and clutch‐size of the Wood Warbler". Ibis. 92.1: 95-98.
- Lack, Elizabeth (1951). "The breeding biology of the swift Apus apus". Ibis. 93.4: 501-546.
- Lack, Elizabeth (1951). "Migration of insects and birds through a Pyrenean pass". The Journal of Animal Ecology.: 63-67.
- Lack, Elizabeth (1951). "Further changes in bird-life caused by afforestation". The Journal of Animal Ecology.: 173-179.
- Lack, David & Lack, Elizabeth (1952). "The breeding behaviour of the swift". British Birds. 45: 186-215.
- Lack, David & Lack, Elizabeth (1954). "The home life of the Swift". Scientific American. 191.1: 60-65.
- Lack, David & Lack, Elizabeth (1958). "The nesting of the Long-tailed Tit". Bird Study. 5.1: 1-19.
- Campbell, Bruce & Lack, Elizabeth eds. (2011). A Dictionary of Birds. Vol. 108. A&C Black.
