= Denis Owen =

Denis Frank Owen (4 April 1931 – 3 October 1996) was a British ecologist, naturalist, author, broadcaster and teacher.

== Education ==
Denis Owen was born in London. He was a student at Roan Grammar School in Greenwich, which he left when he was 16, but eventually he graduated from the University of Oxford.

== Career ==
=== Early ===
After leaving Roan Grammar, he was employed at the British Museum, where he worked in the Bird Room. After a couple of years here he left for National Service. After this, Owen worked from 1951 to 1958 as a field assistant at the Edward Grey Institute for Field Ornithology, Oxford University, under its director, the evolutionary biologist Dr David Lack. Amongst other things, he was responsible for maintaining the records of tits at the Wytham Woods site close to Oxford.

=== Academia ===
Studies

David Lack recommended Owen for a Zoology degree course at Oxford University. By the time Owen graduated, in 1958, he had already written 43 research papers. During this time he met his first wife Jennifer Owen (née Bak) who was also an undergraduate zoologist. The two collaborated on a number of research projects and married following their graduation in 1958. Both moved to the United States to become teaching fellows and PhD students at the University of Michigan.

During four years in the United States, Owen completed his doctoral project on owls and also researched insect ecology, collecting the first New World data on industrial melanism in the peppered moth as well as working on the ecological genetics of spittle bugs.

Appointments

Owen's appointment as lecturer in Zoology at the University College of Makerere (now Makerere University), Uganda in 1962 led to a four-year extended visit in Africa, where he studied the ecological genetics of butterflies and snails. Upon leaving Uganda in 1966, at the age of 35, he took up the Chair of Zoology at Fourah Bay College, later to become the University of Sierra Leone. His research on butterfly ecology and genetics continued, culminating in his 1971 book, Tropical Butterflies. Between 1967 and 1968 he was also Director of a UNESCO Biology Teaching Project for Africa, based in Ghana.

Owen's next move was in 1971 to the University of Lund as Professor of Tropical Ecology, continuing his research on tropical ecology, and also temperate and Arctic ecology, including the genetics of Cepaea snails in Iceland. Owen's final appointment, in 1973, was as Principal Lecturer in Biology at Oxford Polytechnic, which later became Oxford Brookes University. By coincidence he worked closely with David Lack's son Andrew Lack, who was also employed in the same department. Denis Owen remained at Brookes until his retirement in 1996.

Owen was a visiting professor at a number of international universities including the United Nations University (1977–79), the University of Bergen (1990–91) and the University of Florida (1991–92).

Supervision

As well as carrying out his own research, Owen supervised or co-supervised over 20 PhD students, many of whom went on to establish research careers of their own, including Professor Tim Shreeve (Oxford Brookes University), Dr Rob Hammond (University of Leicester), Professor Jeff Ollerton (University of Northampton) and Professor Dave Goulson (University of Sussex).

== Publications ==
During his career he published 240 scientific papers, 40 popular articles and 10 books. His first paper was published in 1949 when he was just 18 years of age.

Owen's most well-known book, What is Ecology?, was published in 1975. The second edition was revised by Jennifer Owen and subsequently translated into five languages. During this period Owen also gave radio broadcasts on Spanish natural history for the BBC World Service (with John Burton) as well as writing a series called "What's in a Name?", published as a book by the BBC.

The ichneumonid wasp genus Owenus is named after Denis Owen, as is the West African hawkmoth Phylloxiphia oweni.

== Family ==
Owen's marriage to Jennifer Owen produced one son and one daughter, and was dissolved in 1994. Later that year he married Clare Shervington. He died in Oxford, aged 65.
