= Andrew Lack =

Andrew Lack may refer to:

- Andrew Lack (author) (born 1953), English biologist and author
- Andrew Lack (executive) (born 1947), chairman of NBC News and MSNBC
