= Mark Millan =

Scottish neuroscientist

Mark J. Millan
- Born: 24 October 1956 (age 69); Edinburgh, Scotland
- Education: B.A., M.A., Ph.D.
- Alma mater: Cambridge University (Gonville and Caius College); Max Planck Institute of Psychiatry, Munich, Germany
- Known for: Research and drug discovery for CNS disorders, especially pain, depression and schizophrenia
- Awards: Serturner Prize for Pain Research, 1985; Ariens Award for Pharmacology, 2014
- Scientific career
- Fields: Neuroscience, psychopharmacology
- Institutions: Institute de Recherche de Servier (IDRS), Croissy-sur-Seine, Paris, France

Mark J. Millan (born 24 October 1956) is a neuroscientist specialising in the study and improved treatment of disorders of the brain. He was the Director of Pharmacological Innovation for the Central Nervous System (CNS) at the Institut de Recherché de Servier (IDRS) in Paris, France. He also served as the Secretary of the European College of Neuropsychopharmacology. Currently he is a visiting professor in the School of Psychology and Neuroscience at the University of Glasgow. Born in Edinburgh, he is the son of former Scottish Labour Party Leader and European Commissioner, Bruce Millan. He studied at Cambridge University and then spent ten years at the Max Planck Institute of Psychiatry, Munich, before moving to Paris.

== Career ==
Millan received his B.A., M.A., and Ph.D. in Natural Sciences from Cambridge University, where he studied at Gonville and Caius College. He went on to retrain in neuroscience and neuropsychiatry at the Max Planck Institute of Psychiatry, in 1978-1987. Millan then joined the Institut de Recherche de Servier in Paris as a Lab Head. In 1993 he was appointed Director of the Psychopharmacology Division, assuming a more strategic role in therapeutic innovation for CNS disorders in 2010.

=== Research focus/interests ===
At the Max Planck Institute, Millan's work focused on pain, stress, and endogenous opioids and earned him the international Serturner Prize for Pain Research. Since joining IDRS, he has directed research into the causes of psychiatric and neurological disorders and led drug discovery programmes for improved treatment, focussing in particular on depression, schizophrenia and Parkinson's disease. This work led to his nomination for the Ariens Prize for Pharmacology in 2014. Reconnecting with his original studies at Cambridge University, Millan is developing network-driven concepts for linking the brain to other complex systems like the eponymous brain coral of coral reefs. The brain and ecosystems share striking parallels in their organisation and vulnerability to multiple stressors, and likewise require protection and early intervention to maintain their health. Millan is also interested in convergent human, avian and Cetacean mechanisms underpinning cognition, social behaviour and language.

Inspired by the work of Jennifer Owen, he has photographically documented vertebrate and invertebrate life just outside Paris, observations forming the basis for talks, exhibitions and articles that stress the importance of protecting local biodiversity.

=== Notable contributions to research ===
Millan's work in Munich was important in demonstrating the role of endorphins, 'the brain's own opioids,' in controlling pain, a mechanisms exploited by morphine for its relief. At the turn of the millennium, he wrote two influential monographs on the induction and control of pain, cited 2,700 and 4,100 times respectively. Millan's collaborative research at Servier has been broad based: from cells to chemical transmitters to cerebral circuits to clinical trials. He is recognised as an expert on the role of monoamines and other neuromodulators in the cause and control of CNS disorders. Further, Millan is working in the newly baptised field of network medicine that includes the "multi-modal" treatment of complex disorders, as documented in his 235 page monograph in 2006. In addition to more than 420 publications, his work has led to nearly 50 patents on potentially-innovative therapy and numerous clinical development programmes. Millan is well known for his contribution to the antidepressant, Valdoxan.

== Awards ==
Millan's research on pain, stress, and endogenous opioids performed at the Max Planck Institute was recognised by two consecutive "Deutsche Forschungs Schwerpunkt" awards, and by the Serturner Prize for Pain Research in 1985. In 2014, he received the Dutch Pharmacological Society's Ariens Prize for Pharmacology based on his "Life-time contribution to psychopharmacology research and drug discovery."

== Positions of trust and responsibility ==
In 2005, Millan was selected as an expert for the ongoing National Institute of Mental Health "MATRICS" initiative for improving cognition in schizophrenia.

Between 2007 and 2019, Millan was a member of the Executive Committee of the European College of Neuropsychopharmacology (ECNP). He was Secretary and chair of the ECNP Workshop for Junior Scientists in Europe, held annually in Nice, France. In 2008, Millan was one of the experts invited to participate in the UK Government's 2008 Foresight Report on stress and mental health entitled "Mental Capital and Wellbeing: Making the most of ourselves in the 21st Century."

In 2009, Millan was nominated to join the Neuropharmacology & Psychopharmacology Department of the Faculty of 1000. In 2010, Millan was appointed an honorary professor at the Institute of Neuroscience and Psychology of the University of Glasgow. In 2014, Millan fronted a major new ECNP initiative on the past, present and future of the therapy of brain disorders, identifying six crucial domains of activity, and proposing a framework for progress.

He was a member of the Editorial Board/Consultant for Psychopharmacology, the Journal of Pharmacology and Experimental Therapeutics and several other international journals. He is Associate Editor at Neuroscience Applied.

In addition, Millan acts as an advisor for the national research foundations of numerous countries, including: France (Association Nationale de Recherche), the UK (Medical Research Council and Welcome Trust), and the US (National Science Foundation, and National Institute of Mental Health).

== Publications ==
Millan has nearly 50 patents. He has published extensively with more than 420 articles and four monographs to his name, in addition to numerous book chapters. He is one of the world's most "ISI highly-cited" researchers in the fields of pharmacology and neuroscience. His current "h" factor is 94 and his work has been cited more than 35,000 times in Scopus. In a study that used a novel, standardized and multi-component metric to compare author impact by citations over a period of 20 years, and included nearly 7 million scientists across many fields, he was classed in the top 0.01%

== Public Outreach ==
Millan has recently been active outside the academic world of Neuropsychiatry in blogs and lectures to general audiences, notably in explaining how the brain works in even the smallest animals and in underlining the benefits of nature for mental well-being. He has also highlighted the significance of gardens and other urban green spaces in talks at the Garden Museum, London, and in articles like one which he wrote for the Royal Horticultural Society. Practical information passed on includes advice on rewilding a garden, alternatives to leaf-blowers (bad for bio-diversity and our mental/physical health) and ways that "Citizen Scientists" can help prevent the spread of invasive species.
