= Wytham Abbey =

Grade I listed Manor House in Wytham, England

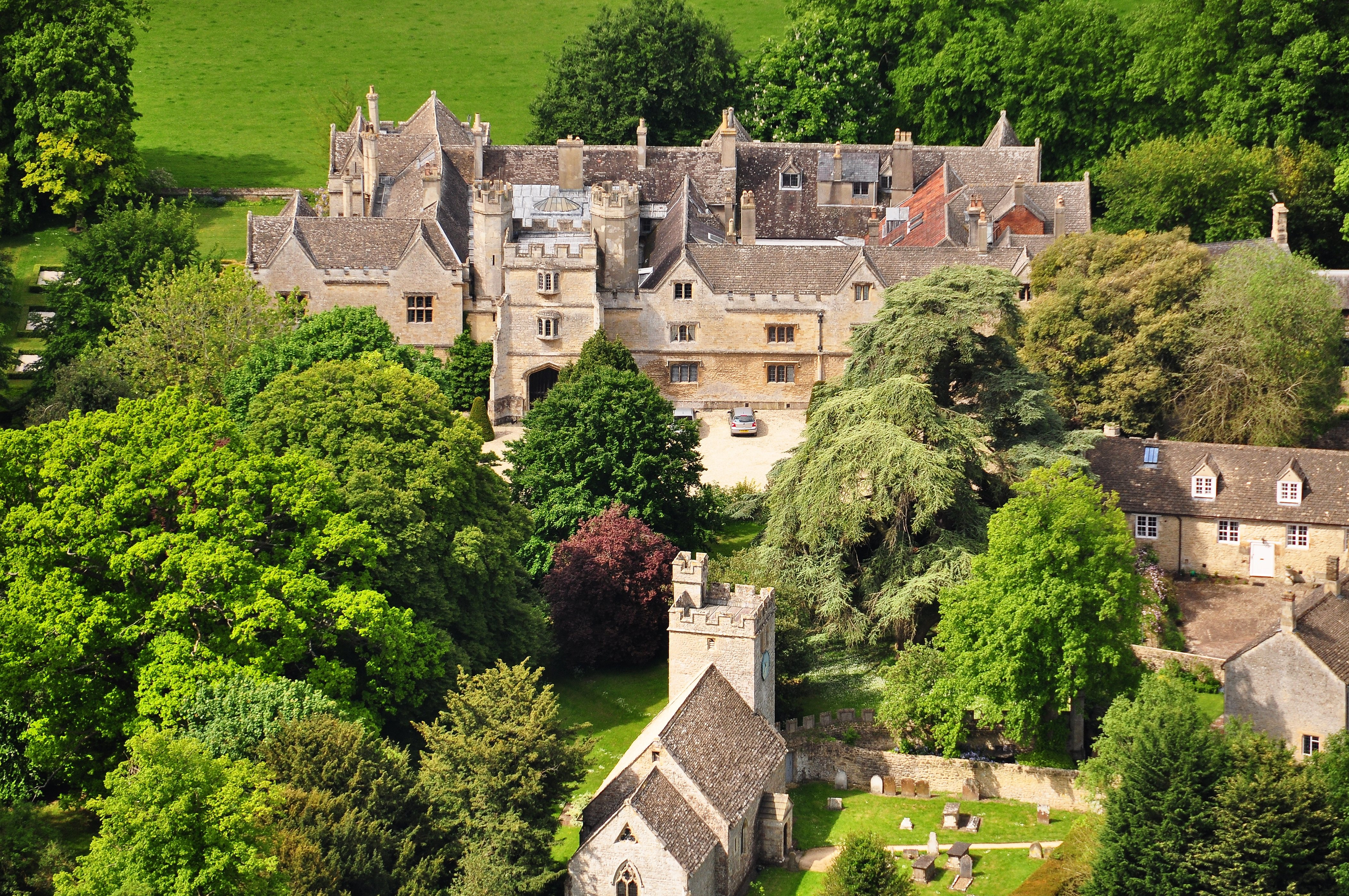
View of Wytham Abbey from the air

Wytham Abbey is a privately owned Grade I listed historic manor house situated in the village of Wytham, 3 miles (5 km) northwest of the centre of Oxford, England, near the River Thames.

The Abbey lies at the edge of Wytham Woods, an area of long-established English woodland and protected as a Site of Special Scientific Interest. Owned by the University of Oxford, the woods are used for research in zoology and climate change. The abbey was owned by the Effective Ventures Foundation, along with 25 acres of grounds until late 2025.

== History ==
Wytham Abbey is the manor house of the small Oxfordshire (historically Berkshire) village of Wytham. The place-name is first recorded as Wihtham around 957 AD and is thought to come from the Old English for a homestead or village in a river-bend. This is perhaps the root of the present pronunciation of the name – “White-ham”.

Known as ‘Wytham House’ until about 1850, Wytham Abbey was built around 1480 and formed part of the extensive lands of the Abbots of Abingdon held since the 12th century. With the Dissolution of the Monasteries, the estate was sold to Sir Richard Harcourt and thereafter passed by marriage to the Earls of Abingdon. The 5th Earl made the Abbey his principal seat in the early 1800s and significantly remodelled the building in the Georgian era Gothic style, which it retains today. The remodelling was undertaken by Thomas Cundy in 1809–10.

In 1920, the 7th Earl sold the Abbey, along with the rest of the 2,500-acre estate, to Colonel Raymond ffennell, who subsequently bequeathed the whole to the University of Oxford. In 1956, the University divided the Abbey into 14 apartments. Over the next three decades, however, the fabric gradually fell into disrepair, and in 1991 the house and grounds were offered for sale. A couple acquired the property and set about restoring the building and returning it to its historical use as a single-family home. They sold the house to the Centre for Effective Altruism now (Effective Ventures Foundation) in 2022. The foundation announced the planned sale of the Abbey in April 2024, and it was placed on the open market with a list price of £15m in May 2024. In August 2025, this was reduced to £5.95m, following failure to find a buyer. It was sold in October 2025 to an unnamed buyer.

During its life to date, the Abbey has hosted many illustrious guests. Queen Elizabeth I visited the house as a princess, as did the young Princess Victoria, later Queen, some 300 years later. The Abbey has had its share of military visitors too, including Oliver Cromwell during the second siege of Oxford in 1646.
