= John Parslow =

English ornithologist and author

- Born: John Leonard Frederick Parslow; 10 July 1935; London, England
- Died: 23 October 2015 (aged 80)
- Occupations: Ornithologist; Author
- Employers: Royal Air Force; British Museum; Edward Grey Institute of Field Ornithology; Monks Wood Experimental Station; RSPB

John Leonard Frederick Parslow (1935–2015) was an English ornithologist and author.

Parslow was born on 10 July 1935 in London, and, after wartime evacuation to Cornwall, was educated at Chingford Grammar School. He undertook National Service at RAF Bawdsey, as a radar operator, from which he was demobbed in 1952.

After work in the Bird Room of the British Museum, he joined the Edward Grey Institute of Field Ornithology in 1959, as assistant to David Lack. he moved to the Nature Conservancy Council's Monks Wood Experimental Station in 1967 to work as an information scientist, investigating the effects of pesticides on the food chain of birds. He was the RSPB's Director of Conservation and Reserves from 1975 to 1987.

Parslow did pioneering work on the detection of bird migration using radar. He was also involved in the creation of a bird observatory at St. Agnes on the Isles of Scilly, which operated from 1957 to 1967.

Parslow was the author of several books, a number of papers on bird migration, and a series of articles for British Birds.

He died at home on 23 October 2015, and was buried at the Arbory Trust Woodland Burial Ground in Barton, Cambridgeshire. He was married twice, to Rosemary, with whom he had a son and two daughters, and to Mariko, who survived him.

== Bibliography ==
- Parslow, John (1973). Breeding Birds of Britain and Ireland: Historical Survey (1st ed.). Berkhampsted: T & A D Poyser Ltd. ISBN 978-0-85661-001-1.
- Thorburn's Birds - Revised By John Parslow. James Fisher (ed.). Book Club Associates. 1976.
- Heinzel, Hermann; Fitter, R. S. R.; Parslow, John (1979). The Birds of Britain and Europe with North Africa and the Middle East (4th Revised ed.). London: Collins. ISBN 978-0-00-219234-7.
- Bird Watchers' Britain: The Unique Pocket Guide to Bird Watching Walks. John Parslow (ed.). Pan Books. 1983. ISBN 978-0-330-28028-0.
- Parslow, John (2010). Breeding Birds of Britain and Ireland. Berkhampsted England: Poyser. ISBN 978-1-4081-3707-9.
