= Daniel Fogg =

English swimmer (born 1987)

Personal information
- Full name: Daniel Lee Fogg
- National team: Great Britain
- Born: 24 August 1987 (age 38) Edmonton, London, England
- Height: 1.78 m (5 ft 10 in)
- Weight: 120 kg (260 lb; 19 st)

Sport
- Sport: Swimming
- Strokes: Freestyle
- Club: Borough of Waltham Forest Gators Loughborough ITC Hatfield Swimming Club
Medal record
Men's swimming
Representing Great Britain
European Championships
Gold medal – first place	2014 Berlin	5 km open water
Representing England
Commonwealth Games
Bronze medal – third place	2010 Delhi	1500 m freestyle

Daniel Lee Fogg (born 24 August 1987) is an English competitive swimmer who has represented Great Britain in the Olympics, World and European Championships as well as England in the Commonwealth Games. Daniel Fogg specialises in the 1500-metre freestyle and open water swimming events.

== Early career ==
Daniel started his career swimming for London Borough of Waltham Forest (Gators) Swimming Club, representing the club at all levels, also captaining the club. In 2005, Daniel was selected to swim for the Great British Junior team at the European Junior Swimming Championships in Budapest, Hungary. Daniel came 8th in the 1500m freestyle in a time of 15:42.61.

Daniel Fogg started his education at Chase Lane and later moved on to Rush Croft Sports College in Chingford, London. He then attended Chingford Foundation School to study A levels in the Sixth form.

Daniel went on to swim for Loughborough University swim team, as well as study sports science at the university.

== International career ==
Daniel was first selected for the senior British team in for the 2008 European Short Course Swimming Championships, competing in both the 400-metre freestyle and 1500-metre freestyle. In 2009, Fogg was selected for the World Championships in Rome, competing in the 10-kilometre event.

Fogg won a bronze medal at the 2010 Commonwealth Games competing in the men's 1500-metre freestyle. At the 2012 Summer Olympics in London, Fogg came 5th in the open water 10-kilometre and 8th in the 1,500-metre freestyle.

== See also ==
- List of Commonwealth Games medallists in swimming (men)
