= Begbroke Science Park =

Science park of Oxford University

Coordinates: 51°49′05″N 01°18′24″W

Oxford University Science Park, Begbroke logo

Oxford University Science Park, Begbroke is a science park located around five miles north of Oxford, England. It is the only science park wholly owned and managed by Oxford University and sits within the university's Mathematical, Physical and Life Sciences Division.

== History ==
The site has been the home of research facilities since 1960, when the Weed Research Organisation was headquartered there. It was later used as the Technology Centre of the Cookson Group. The site was bought by Oxford University in 1998.

The science park is home to a mix of start-ups, spin-outs, growing technology companies, university research groups and R&D groups from larger international businesses. As of 2026, there are around 30 companies and over 20 research groups based there. Major buildings on site include the Centre for Innovation and Enterprise (containing the AgileLab), the Institute of Advanced Technology, and the Hirsch Building.

The university owns 200 acres (81 ha) of land surrounding the science park, which is mainly devoted to agriculture. The science park is developed on a 10-acre site at the centre.
