= Where Do Camels Belong? =

2014 book by Ken Thompson

- Author: Ken Thompson
- Publication date: 20 March 2014
- ISBN: 9781781251744

Where Do Camels Belong? is a book by biologist Ken Thompson.

The book examines the science and history of invasive species. The book describes itself as "an examination of the whole question of native and alien species, and what might be called an alien invasions industry—and its implications".

The title of the book is in reference to a question posed on its first page, questioning the reader as to "where camels belong?" as a native species; while pointing out that while most associated with the Middle East, camels actually first evolved in North America, are most diverse in South America, and have their only truly wild extant population in Australia.
