= Open water swimming at the 2014 European Aquatics Championships – Men's 5 km =

Men's 5 km at the Open water swimming at the 2014 European Aquatics Championships
- Dates: 13 August
- Competitors: 26 from 14 nations
- Winning time: 53:41.4

Medalists
gold medal	Daniel Fogg	Great Britain
silver medal	Rob Muffels	Germany
bronze medal	Thomas Lurz	Germany

The Men's 5 km competition of the 2014 European Aquatics Championships was held on 13 August. The time trial format was used, swimmers started at 1-minute intervals from each other and raced against the clock.

== Results ==
The race was started at 13:30.

Rank	Swimmer	Nationality	Time
1st place, gold medalist(s)	Daniel Fogg	Great Britain	53:41.4
2nd place, silver medalist(s)	Rob Muffels	Germany	54:01.8
3rd place, bronze medalist(s)	Thomas Lurz	Germany	54:02.6
4	Simone Ercoli	Italy	54:12.3
5	Sören Meissner	Germany	54:19.2
6	Nicola Bolzonello	Italy	54:33.9
7	Kirill Abrosimov	Russia	54:34.9
8	Romain Beraud	France	54:43.9
9	Luca Ferretti	Italy	54:58.3
10	Antonios Fokaidis	Greece	55:08.0
11	Patrik Rákos	Hungary	55:19.2
12	Artem Podyakov	Russia	55:59.1
13	Ventsislav Aydarski	Bulgaria	55:59.6
14	Matthias Schweinzer	Austria	56:10.1
15	Márk Papp	Hungary	56:21.2
16	Antonio Arroyo	Spain	56:29.3
17	Jan Pošmourný	Czech Republic	57:00.8
18	Anton Evsikov	Russia	57:02.9
19	Thomas Liess	Switzerland	57:26.3
20	Mark Deans	Great Britain	57:28.5
21	Kyrylo Shvets	Ukraine	57:54.0
22	Danylo Sereda	Ukraine	58:26.4
23	Jakub Tobias	Czech Republic	58:37.3
24	Dániel Székelyi	Hungary	59:46.7
—	Pál Joensen	Faroe Islands	DSQ
—	Marc-Antoine Olivier	France	DSQ
