= Ben Sheldon =

British biologist

- Education: University of Cambridge, University of Sheffield
- Occupation: Ornithologist
- Employers: Department of Zoology, University of Oxford (2016–); Edward Grey Institute of Field Ornithology (2004–)
- Awards: Scientific Medal of the Zoological Society of London (2004) Linnean Medal (2020) Academia Europaea (2020) Fellow of the Royal Society (2022)
- Scientific career
- Workplaces: Department of Zoology, University of Oxford (2016–); Edward Grey Institute of Field Ornithology (2004–)
- Website: www.zoo.ox.ac.uk/people/professor-ben-sheldon

Benjamin Conrad Sheldon FRS is the Luc Hoffmann Chair in Field Ornithology and Director of the Edward Grey Institute of Field Ornithology of the University of Oxford's Department of Zoology. He was Head of the Department of Zoology between 2016 and 2021.

His research addresses causes and consequences of individual variation in wild populations, particularly of birds.

He was awarded the 2020 Linnean Medal for "his service to science in the field of Zoology", and elected as Fellow of the Royal Society in 2022.

== Education and career ==
Sheldon obtained his BA in Natural Sciences (Part II Zoology) at University of Cambridge, where lectures from Prof Nick Davies in Behavioural Ecology were particularly influential, and his PhD in Zoology from the University of Sheffield, under the supervision of Prof Tim Birkhead. He held a series of postdoctoral fellowships at the University of Uppsala and University of Edinburgh, before moving to the University of Oxford to hold a Royal Society University Research Fellowship in 2000.

Sheldon was appointed Head of the Edward Grey Institute in 2002, following the retirement of Prof Chris Perrins and elected as the first holder of the Luc Hoffmann Chair in Field Ornithology in 2004. He was Associate Head of Department from 2011 to 2016, and Head of Department from 2016 to 2021.

== Awards and honours ==
- 1997 Association for the Study of Animal Behaviour Outstanding New Researcher Award
- 2000 Royal Society University Research Fellow
- 2004 Scientific Medal of the Zoological Society of London
- 2013 Royal Society Wolfson Merit Award
- 2018 Distinguished Naturalist Award of the American Society of Naturalists
- 2020 Linnean Medal
- 2020 Elected to the Academia Europaea
- 2022 Fellow of the Royal Society

== Select publications ==
- Sheldon, Ben; Verhulst, Simon (1996). "Ecological immunology: costly parasite defences and trade-offs in evolutionary ecology". Trends in Ecology & Evolution. 11 (8): 317–321. doi:10.1016/0169-5347(96)10039-2. PMID 21237861. Wikidata Q34159212.
- Anne Charmantier; McCleery, Robin H.; Lionel R Cole; Perrins, Christopher Miles; Kruuk, Elizabeth Beatrice Loeske; Sheldon, Ben (2008). "Adaptive phenotypic plasticity in response to climate change in a wild bird population". Science. 320 (5877): 800–803. doi:10.1126/science.1157174. PMID 18467590. Wikidata Q31155027.
- Clutton-Brock, Tim; Sheldon, Ben (2010). "Individuals and populations: the role of long-term, individual-based studies of animals in ecology and evolutionary biology". Trends in Ecology & Evolution. 25 (10): 562–573. doi:10.1016/j.tree.2010.08.002. PMID 20828863. Wikidata Q37786711.
