= Andrew Lack (author) =

English biologist and author

- Born: Andrew John Lack; November 1953 (age 72); England
- Education: Dragon School; Bryanston School
- Alma mater: University of Aberdeen; University of Cambridge
- Known for: Ecology
- Parents: David Lack (father); Elizabeth Lack (mother)
- Scientific career
- Fields: Botany
- Workplaces: Swansea University; Brookes University
- Website: brookes.ac.uk

Dr Andrew John Lack (born 1953) is an English biologist and author, specializing in botany and based at Oxford Brookes University.

Andrew Lack is the son of the ornithologists Elizabeth and David Lack (1910–1973). He was educated at the Dragon School, Oxford and Bryanston School, Dorset. He studied for an undergraduate degree in botany at Aberdeen University and obtained his doctorate, also in botany, from the University of Cambridge.

Lack was a lecturer at Swansea University for seven years. In 1987, he became a lecturer in biology at Oxford Brookes University where he contributed to modules taught on the Environmental Biology degree, along with contemporaries such as Denis Owen.

Andrew Lack's research is in the area of plant reproductive ecology and genetics, especially pollination, tropical rain forest ecology, and the history and philosophy of the interaction of humans with the environment.

In 2008, Lack published the book Redbreast: The Robin in Life and Literature, a literary collection based on the robin. This was an updated version of a book published by his father, David Lack.

Andrew Lack is married, has four children, and lives in Oxford. He leads the Isis Chamber Orchestra.

== Books ==
Lack has written the following books:

- The Natural History of Pollination, with Michael Proctor and Peter Yeo (HarperCollins, New Naturalist series, No. 83, 1996, ISBN 978-0-00-219905-6)
- Instant Notes: Plant Biology, with David E. Evans (BIOS Scientific Publishers, Instant Notes series, 2001, ISBN 978-0-387-91613-2)
- The Museum Swifts, with Roy Overall (Oxford University Museum of Natural History, 2002)
- Instant Notes: Plant Biology, 2nd edition, with David E. Evans (Taylor & Francis, Instant Notes series, 2005, ISBN 978-0-415-35643-5)
- Redbreast: The Robin in Life and Literature (SMH Books, 2008, ISBN 978-0-9553827-2-7)
- Poppy (Reaktion, 2016, ISBN 978-1-780-23653-7)

He has contributed to:

- Silent Summer ed. Norman Maclean (Cambridge University Press 2010, ISBN 978-0-521-51966-3)
- Nature Tales comp. Michael Allen & Sonya Patel Ellis (Elliott and Thompson 2010, ISBN 978-1-904027-94-2)
