= South Chingford Foundation School =

Location
- Rushcroft Road; Chingford, London, E4 8SG; England

Information
- Type: Academy
- Motto: Building ambition for all
- Established: 1978
- Department for Education URN: 138859 Tables
- Ofsted: Reports
- Executive Principal: Emma Hobbs
- Staff: 30
- Gender: Coeducational
- Age: 11 to 18
- Enrolment: 500~
- Houses: 5 Green Houses, 5 Orange Houses, 5 Blue Houses, 5 Red Houses, 5 Purple Houses, 2 Yellow Houses
- Colours: Green, Yellow, Purple
- Website: www.southchingfordfoundation.org.uk

South Chingford Foundation School (formerly Rush Croft Sports College and Rush Croft Foundation School) is a coeducational secondary school and sixth form with academy status, located in the Chingford area of the London Borough of Waltham Forest, England.

The school was awarded specialist Sports College status, before converting to academy status on 1 October 2012. Since converting to an academy, the school is now run by the Chingford Academies Trust, which also includes Chingford Foundation School. The current headteacher is Emma Hobbs who took control replacing Robert Mammen in April 2024.

The school's motto/vision is 'Building ambition for all'.

== Notable former pupils ==
- Patrick Agyemang, footballer
- Curtis Davies, footballer
- Daniel Fogg, swimmer
- Andros Townsend, footballer
