= Connor Emerton =

English cricketer (born 1994)

Personal information
- Full name: Connor John Emerton
- Born: 5 June 1994 (age 32); Hillingdon, Middlesex, England
- Nickname: Collin Frissell
- Batting: Right-handed
- Bowling: Right-arm medium

Domestic team information
- Years: Team
- 2016: Cambridge MCCU
- 2016: Cambridge University
- 2016: Hertfordshire

Career statistics
Competition	First-class
Matches	2
Runs scored	16
Batting average	4.00
100s/50s	–/–
Top score	6
Balls bowled	206
Wickets	2
Bowling average	91.50
5 wickets in innings	–
10 wickets in match	–
Best bowling	2/100
Catches/stumpings	–/–
- Source: Cricinfo, 2 July 2019

Connor John Emerton (born 5 June 1994) is an English former first-class cricketer.

Emerton was born at Hillingdon in June 1994. He was educated at Parmiter's School, before going up to Jesus College, Cambridge. While studying at Cambridge, Emerton made two appearances in first-class cricket in 2016. The first came for Cambridge MCCU against Nottinghamshire at Fenner's, while the second came for Cambridge University against Oxford University at Oxford. In addition to playing first-class cricket in 2016, he also appeared in minor counties cricket for Hertfordshire, making a single appearance in the 2016 Minor Counties Championship.
