= Department of Plant Sciences, University of Oxford =

Coordinates: 51.7590°N 1.2524°W

Department of Plant Sciences
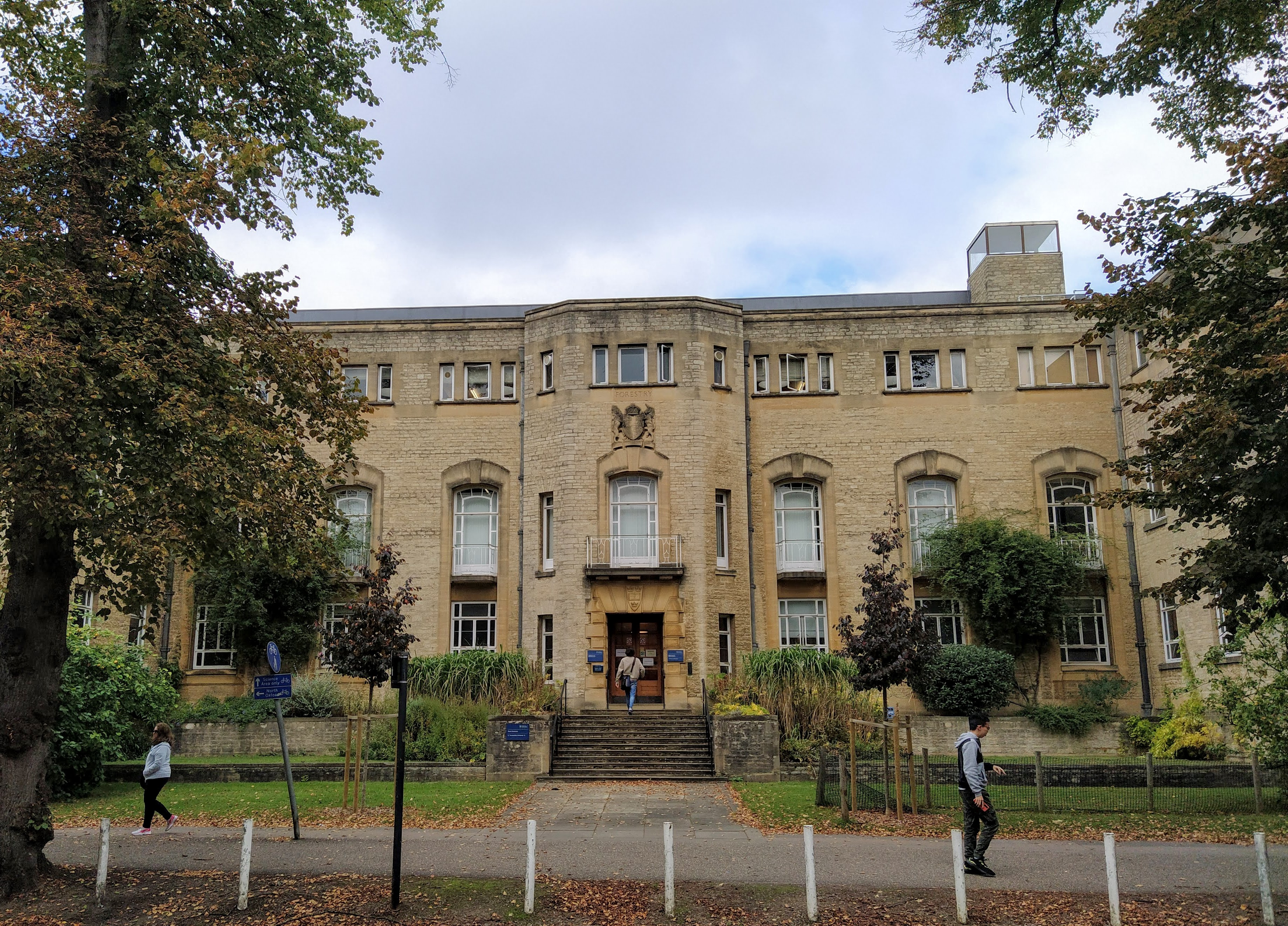
- Merged into: Department of Zoology
- Successor: Department of Biology
- Formation: 1621
- Dissolved: 2022
- Website: www.plants.ox.ac.uk

The Department of Plant Sciences was a former academic department at the Mathematical, Physical and Life Sciences Division at the University of Oxford in Oxford, England, United Kingdom. It focused on plant and fungal biology. It was merged with the Department of Zoology to form the Department of Biology on 1 August 2022.

== Herbaria ==
The department housed the Oxford University Herbaria that consists of two herbaria:

- Fielding-Druce Herbarium.
- Daubeny Herbarium.

In total the collections contain 800,000 specimens and benefits from close links with the university's Oxford Botanic Garden. The herbaria are now housed under the title of Department of Biology.

== History ==
Forestry was an important part of the university under the name of the Imperial Forestry Institute, from 1924; later the Commonwealth Forestry Institute from 1939. The Oxford Forestry Institute was incorporated into the Department of Plant Sciences in 2002, and research relating to forestry was undertaken under that name until 2022 when the department merged with the Department of Zoology to form the Department of Biology. Some students were Imperial Forest Service students, who came from many parts of the British Empire to qualify as foresters before they returned home. It ran a post graduate MSc forestry course for many years: Forestry and its Relation to Land Use, until 2002.

In January 2021, the Oxford City Council approved the £200m construction of the Life and Mind Building, which will be the university's largest building project and combine the Departments of Experimental Psychology and Biology. It will replace the Tinbergen Building on South Parks Road, which was closed and demolished when asbestos was discovered in 2017. The building will feature multiple laboratories, teaching and testing spaces providing research facilities for 800 students and 1200 researchers. Work is expected to start in June 2021, with the building opening in September 2024.

== See also ==
- Department of Biology, University of Oxford
- University of Oxford Botanic Garden
