= Iain Rice =

Model railway enthusiast (1947–2022)

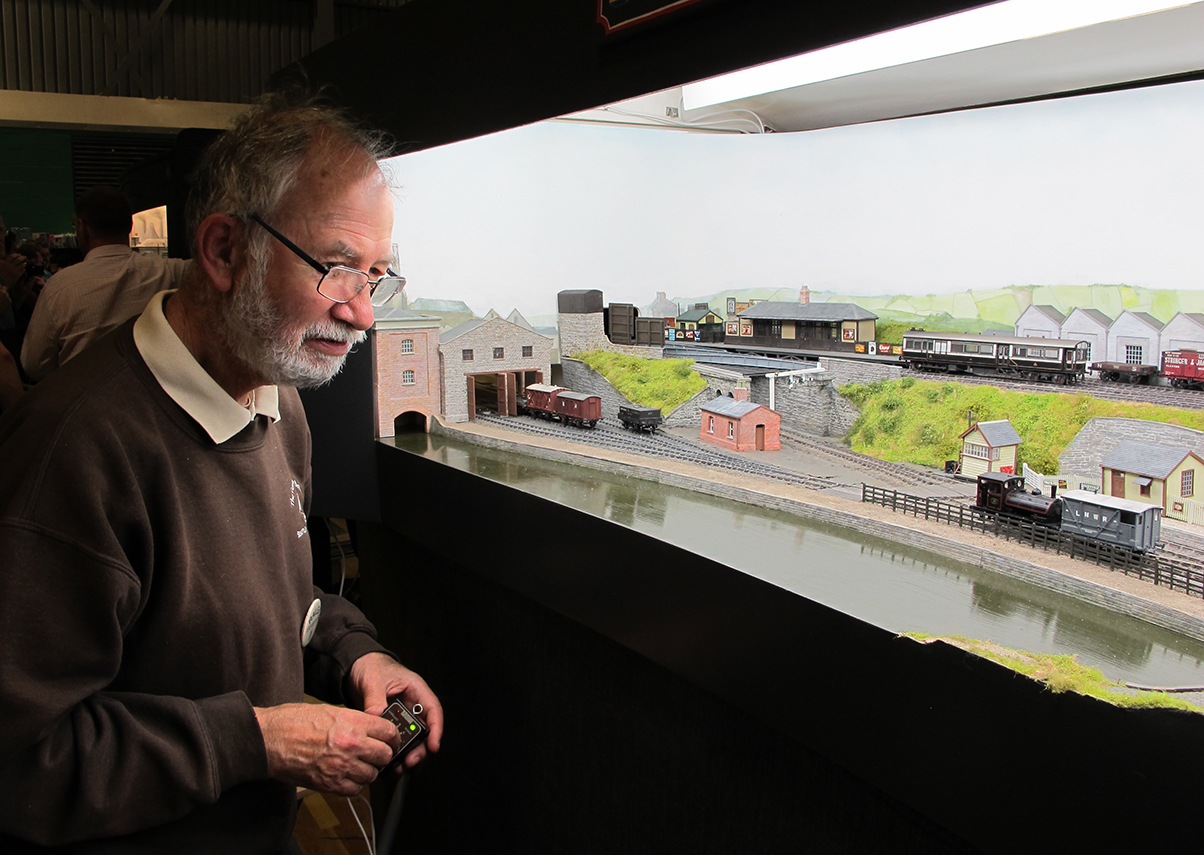
- Rice in 2019 with his final layout, Longwood Edge
- Born: Iain Alexander Rice; 11 October 1947; Crouch End, London, England
- Died: 8 October 2022 (aged 74)
- Education: Parmiter's School; Chingford County High School; Reigate College of Art
- Occupations: Railway modeller; Writer; Illustrator; Firefighter

Iain Alexander Rice (11 October 1947 – 8 October 2022) was a British model railway enthusiast, writer and illustrator who authored more than 20 books and 400 articles on model railways over five decades. Railway Modeller described Rice as one of the hobby's "most influential and prominent enthusiasts of the last fifty years".

== Biography ==
Iain Alexander Rice was born 11 October 1947 in Crouch End, north London, and grew up in Chingford in east London. He constructed his first model railway when he was eight. Rice was educated at Parmiter's School in Bethnal Green followed by Chingford County High School, then Reigate College of Art in Surrey. In 1971 Rice began working as a firefighter in the Northamptonshire Fire Brigade, before moving to Devon in 1977 and subsequently serving 26 years as a retained firefighter with the Devon Fire Brigade.

Rice began contributing to the model railway press in the 1970s, with his first books published in the 1980s for Wild Swan Publications. His writings were often accompanied by his own artwork. In the 1990s Rice helped launch and edit Modelling Railways Illustrated followed by the short-lived periodical Rail Model Digest. In the 2000s he also wrote a series of books on model railroads for the American publisher Kalmbach Books.

== Books ==
- Rice, Iain (1988). Plastic Structure Kits: Making the Most of the Wills Scenic Series. Wild Swan Publications. ISBN 978-0-90-686771-6.
- ———— (1989). Whitemetal Locos: A Kitbuilder's Guide. Wild Swan Publications. ISBN 978-0-90-686777-8.
- ———— (1990). An Approach to Model Railway Layout Design: Finescale in Small Spaces. Wild Swan Publications. ISBN 978-0-90-686785-3.
- ———— (1990). Etched Loco Construction. Wild Swan Publications. ISBN 978-0-90-686786-0.
- ———— (1991). An Approach to Building Finescale Track in 4mm. Wild Swan Publications. ISBN 978-1-87-410300-4.
- ———— (1991). Light Railway Layout Designs. Wild Swan Publications. ISBN 978-0-90-686794-5.
- ———— (1993). Detailing and Improving Ready to Run Wagons. Irwell Press. ISBN 978-1-87-160842-7.
- ———— (1993). Getting the Best from Plastic Wagon Kits. Irwell Press. ISBN 978-1-87-160856-4.
- ———— (1993). Locomotive Kit Chassis Construction in 4mm. Wild Swan Publications. ISBN 978-1-87-410310-3.
- ———— (1994). Detailing and Improving Ready to Run Locos. Irwell Press. ISBN 978-1-87-160854-0.
- ————, ed. (1995). An Introduction to 4mm Fine Scale Railway Modelling. Hawkshill Publishing. ISBN 978-1-90-034901-7.
- ————, ed. (1996). Newton Abbot: 150 Years a Railway Town. Hawkshill Publishing. ISBN 978-1-90-034908-6.
- ———— (1997). A Pragmatic Guide to Building, Wiring and Laying PCB Track. RailModel. ISBN 978-1-90-034909-3.
- ———— (2000). Small, Smart & Practical Track Plans. Kalmbach Publishing Co. ISBN 978-0-89-024416-6.
- ———— (2000). Devon Firefighter: A Century of Courage and Service. Halsgrove. ISBN 978-1-85-522760-6.
- ———— (2002). Designs for Urban Layouts. Atlantic Transport Publishers. ISBN 978-1-90-287708-2.
- ———— (2002). The Book of Chagford: A Town Apart. Halsgrove. ISBN 978-1-84-114193-0.
- ———— (2003). Mainlines in Modest Spaces. Atlantic Transport Publishers. ISBN 978-1-90-282711-7.
- ———— (2003). Mid-Sized & Manageable Track Plans. Kalmbach Publishing Co. ISBN 978-0-89-024623-8.
- ———— (2007). Railway Modelling: The Realistic Way. J. H. Haynes & Co. ISBN 978-1-84-425359-3.
- ———— (2009). Shelf Layouts for Model Railroads. Kalmbach Publishing Co. ISBN 978-0-89-024690-0.
- ———— (2010). Realistic Railway Modelling: Layout Design. J. H. Haynes & Co. ISBN 978-1-84-425635-8.
- ———— (2013). Realistic Railway Modelling: Locomotives. J. H. Haynes & Co. ISBN 978-1-84-425636-5.
- ———— (2014). Modelling with Plastic Structure Kits: Getting the best from the Wills and Ratio Ranges. Wild Swan Publications. ISBN 978-1-90-876311-2.
- ———— (2015). Compact Layout Design. Kalmbach Publishing Co. ISBN 978-0-89-024996-3.
- ———— (2016). Creating Cameo Layouts. Wild Swan Publications. ISBN 978-0-95-387717-1.
