= Ernst Sutter =

Swiss ornithologist (1914–1999)

Ernst Sutter (7 August 1914 – 9 November 1999) was a Swiss ornithologist and curator at the Basel museum. Sutter was a pioneer of radar ornithology, the study of bird migration using radar, in Europe.

== Biography ==
Sutter was born in Basel where he studied. In the 1930s he participated in bird ringing at the Swiss Ornithological Institute and went to study zoology under Professor Adolf Portmann. Sutter's research was on the avian brain, its growth, and its development. He also conducted research on growth and moult in several bird species.

Sutter completed his doctorate in 1943 and joined the museum in 1949 as a curator. He joined a collection expedition to Sumba travelling with the ethnologist Alfred Bühler. Sutter worked at the Basel museum until his retirement in 1980 but continued to work in an honorary position.

A major research that Sutter undertook was on the study of bird migration using radar that he began at Zurich airport in 1954. He presented a summary of his research in 1958 at the International Ornithological Congress in Helsinki. He also helped organize the Congress of 1954 at Basel and edited the proceedings of the conference. He was an editor of the Swiss journal Der Ornithologische Beobachter and advised many doctoral students.
