= Alexéi Rojas =

Footballer (born 2005)

Personal information
- Full name: Alexéi Rojas Fedorushchenko
- Date of birth: 28 September 2005 (age 21)
- Place of birth: Basildon, England
- Height: 6 ft 1 in (1.86 m)
- Position: Goalkeeper

Team information
- Current team: Penafiel
- Number: 12

Youth career
- Boreham Wood
- St Albans City
- –2016: London Colney Colts
- 2016–2019: Chelsea
- 2019–2026: Arsenal

Senior career*
Years	Team	Apps	(Gls)
2024–2026	Arsenal	0	(0)
2026–	Penafiel	0	(0)

International career
2022	Colombia U17	1	(0)
2022–2025	Colombia U20	6	(0)
Medal record
Men's football
Representing Colombia
FIFA U-20 World Cup
Third place	2025 Chile
South American U-20 Championship
Third place	2023 Colombia
Third place	2025 Venezuela
Bolivarian Games
Bronze medal – third place	2022 Valledupar
- * Club domestic league appearances and goals as of 12 September 2026

Alexéi Rojas Fedorushchenko (Russian: Алексей Рохас Федорущенко; born 28 September 2005) is a professional footballer who plays as a goalkeeper for Liga Portugal 2 side Penafiel. Born in England and educated at Parmiter's School, he is a Colombia youth international.

== Club career ==
Rojas began playing football with Boreham Wood at the age of 5, and thereafter had stints with St Albans City and London Colney Colts. He was initially part of English Premier League side Chelsea's youth setup, before joining the youth academy of Arsenal in 2019.

During his time with Arsenal, he appeared on the bench in senior squad's games twice, including a Champions League game against Slavia Prague on 4 November 2025, as a minor injury to Kepa Arrizabalaga opened up a squad spot.

On 18 July 2026, Rojas signed with Penafiel in Liga Portugal 2.

== International career ==
Rojas is eligible to represent England internationally, having been born there, Colombia, through his father, and Russia through his mother.

=== Youth ===
In February 2022, Rojas was called up for a series of Russia U17 games in a tournament in Croatia, but remained on the bench in all of the games. At the end of February, Russia was excluded from international competitive games due to the Russo-Ukrainian war, including junior teams.

On 4 January 2023, Rojas received a call-up from Colombia U20 manager Héctor Cárdenas for the highly anticipated 2023 South American U-20 Championship, held in Colombia. Despite being part of the talented squad that managed to secure a third-place finish, Rojas remained an unused substitute throughout the tournament, with the experienced Luis Marquinez taking the role of first-choice goalkeeper.

== Honours ==
Arsenal U21

- FA Youth Cup runner-up: 2022–23

Colombia U20

- FIFA U-20 World Cup third place: 2025
