= Divisions of the University of Oxford =

The academic faculties, schools, and departments of the University of Oxford are organized into four divisions, each under the leadership of a divisional head and a divisional board. The divisions are the Humanities Division; the Social Sciences Division; the Mathematical, Physical and Life Sciences Division; and the Medical Sciences Division.

== Humanities Division ==
The Humanities Division comprises the following faculties and departments:

- Faculty of Classics
- Faculty of English
- Faculty of History
- Department of History of Art
- Faculty of Linguistics, Philology & Phonetics
- Faculty of Medieval and Modern Languages
- Faculty of Music
- Faculty of Asian and Middle Eastern Studies
- Faculty of Philosophy
- Faculty of Theology and Religion
- Oxford Research Centre in the Humanities
- Rothermere American Institute
- Ruskin School of Art
- Voltaire Foundation

The Humanities Division has been physically expanding into the new Radcliffe Observatory Quarter in Oxford. The current Head of the Humanities Division is Professor Daniel Grimley, who was appointed in January 2022. Professor Sally Shuttleworth was Head from 2006 to 2011, Professor Shearer West served as Head between August 2011 and 2015, and Chris Wickham until 2018.

== Medical Sciences Division ==
Medicine has been taught at the University of Oxford since the 13th century. In 1770, John Radcliffe, an Oxford-educated physician founded the Radcliffe Infirmary.

The Medical Sciences Division comprises the following departments:

- Department of Biochemistry
- Nuffield Department of Clinical Medicine
- Nuffield Department of Clinical Neurosciences
- Nuffield Department of Medicine
- School of Medicine and Biomedical Sciences
- Department of Experimental Psychology
- Radcliffe Department of Medicine
- Department of Oncology
- Nuffield Department of Orthopaedics, Rheumatology and Musculoskeletal Sciences
- Department of Paediatrics
- Sir William Dunn School of Pathology
- Department of Pharmacology
- Department of Physiology, Anatomy & Genetics
- Nuffield Department of Population Health
- Nuffield Department of Primary Care Health Sciences
- Department of Psychiatry
- Nuffield Department of Surgical Sciences
- Nuffield Department of Women's & Reproductive Health

For the research institutes:

- The Weatherall Institute of Molecular Medicine is a research institute of the Radcliffe Department of Medicine
- The Wellcome Trust Centre for Human Genetics is a research institute of the Nuffield Department of Medicine.
- The Collaborating Centre for Oxford University and CUHK for Disaster and Medical Humanitarian Response is a partnership between the Nuffield Department of Medicine and CUHK Faculty of Medicine.
- The Nuffield Laboratory of Ophthalmology is a division of the Nuffield Department of Clinical Neurosciences.
- The CRUK/MRC Oxford Institute for Radiation Oncology is a research institute of the Department of Oncology.
- The Centre for Evidence-Based Medicine is a research centre of the Nuffield Department of Primary Care Health Sciences.

The current Head of the Division is Gavin Screaton, the current Divisional Registrar & Chief Operating Officer is Chris Price. Professor Alastair Buchan was head from 2007 to 2017

== Mathematical, Physical and Life Sciences Division ==
The Mathematical, Physical and Life Sciences Division comprises the following academic departments:

- Begbroke Science Park
- Department of Biology (formed following the 2022 merger of the Department of Plant Sciences and the Department of Zoology)
- Department of Chemistry
- Department of Computer Science
- Doctoral Training Centre
- Department of Earth Sciences
- Department of Engineering Science
- Department of Materials
- Mathematical Institute
- Department of Physics
- Department of Statistics

The current head of the Mathematical, Physical and Life Sciences Division (MPLS) is Professor James Naismith, appointed in 2023 and taking office in October 2023. From 2007 to 2015, the head was Professor Alex Halliday. Professor Sam Howison led the division from 2019 to 2023.

== Social Sciences Division ==
The Social Sciences Division represents the largest grouping of social sciences of any university in the United Kingdom. As a major provider of social science research, it is accredited by the Economic and Social Research Council as a Doctoral Training Centre of excellence in research training.

The Social Sciences Division comprises the following schools and departments:

- School of Anthropology and Museum Ethnography
- School of Archaeology
- Saïd Business School
- Department of Economics
- Department of Education
- School of Geography and the Environment
- Oxford School of Global and Area Studies
- Blavatnik School of Government
- Department of International Development
- Oxford Internet Institute
- Faculty of Law
- Oxford Martin School
- Department of Politics and International Relations
- Department of Social Policy and Intervention
- Department of Sociology

From 2021 the division's head is Professor Timothy Power. From 2008 to 2017 the head was Professor Roger Goodman.

== Gardens, Libraries and Museums ==
The Gardens, Libraries and Museums (GLAM) administers the following entities:

- Ashmolean Museum
- Bodleian Libraries
- History of Science Museum
- Oxford University Museum of Natural History
- Pitt Rivers Museum
- University of Oxford Botanic Garden

In 2016, Academic Services and University Collections (ASUC) changed its name to Gardens, Libraries and Museums (GLAM). GLAM is overseen by the directors of the six GLAM departments chaired by the Pro-Vice-Chancellor (People & GLAM), as of 2024 Richard Ovenden.

== Department for Continuing Education ==
The Department for Continuing Education works with the divisions to promote continuing education.

== See also ==
- Colleges of the University of Oxford
- Schools of the University of Cambridge
