= Radar ornithology =

Radar ornithology is the use of radar technology in studies of bird migration and in approaches to prevent bird strikes particularly to aircraft. The technique was developed from the observations of pale wisps seen moving on radar during the Second World War. These were termed as "angels", "ghosts", or "phantoms" in Britain and were later identified as being caused by migrating birds. Over time, the technology has been vastly improved with Doppler weather radars that allow the detection of birds, bats, as well as insects with resolution and sensitivity that is sufficient to quantify the speed of flaps that can sometimes aid in the identification of species.

== History ==
According to David Lack, the earliest recorded use of radar in detecting birds came in 1940. The movements of gulls, herons and lapwings that caused some of the detentions was visually confirmed. It was however only in the 1950s through the work of Ernst Sutter at Zurich airport that more elusive "angels" were confirmed to be caused by small passerines. David Lack was one of the pioneers of radar ornithology in England.

== Applications ==
Early radar ornithology mainly focused, due to limitations of the equipment, on the seasonality, timing, intensity, and direction of flocks of birds in migration. Modern weather radars can detect the wing area of the flying, the speed of flight, the frequency of wing beat, the direction, distance and altitude. The sensitivity and modern analytical techniques now allows detection of flying insects as well.

Radar has been used to study seasonal variations in starling roosting behaviour. It has also been used to identify risks to aircraft operations at airports. The technique has been in conservation applications such as being used to assess the risk to birds by proposed wind energy installations, to quantify the number of birds at roost or nesting sites.
