= Chingford Foundation School =

Location
- Nevin Drive; London, E4 7LT; England; 51.629979°N 0.00721°W

Information
- Type: Academy
- Motto: A firm foundation for life
- Established: 1938
- Department for Education URN: 138691 Tables
- Ofsted: Reports
- Head of School: Gary Haines
- Gender: Coeducational
- Age: 11 to 18
- Enrolment: 1475
- Colours: Maroon, gold
- Website: https://www.chingfordfoundation.org/

Chingford Foundation School is a coeducational state secondary school and sixth form located in Chingford in the London Borough of Waltham Forest. It is a specialist Humanities College and has been an academy since October 2012.

== History ==
Chingford Foundation School (a co-educational all-inclusive school) was opened in 1938 in temporary premises at Hawkwood House in Yardley Lane, under the control of Essex County Council, as Chingford County High School. The following year, it was evacuated to the west of England and it did not occupy its present buildings in Nevin Drive until 1941. The school was enlarged in 1957.

In 1968, secondary schools in Waltham Forest, to which Chingford had been transferred in 1965, adopted the Comprehensive system. It became Chingford Senior High School with a mixed-ability intake of 14- to 18-year-olds. In the 1980s, pupils aged 11 to 14 studied at Chingford junior high school in Wellington Avenue, which later became a primary school, and then moved to Chingford senior high school to take O levels and later, GCSEs. In the late 80s early 90s, the sixth form was abolished, and sixth form pupils moved to either Sir George Monoux College or Leyton Sixth Form College.

Following another borough-wide reorganisation programme in 1986, and a further name change to Chingford School in 1993, the school became grant maintained, giving the school direct government funding and autonomy from the local authority. This allowed the school to re-establish its sixth form facility, for years 12 and 13. A new Sixth Form Centre was opened in 1997.

In 2000, the school became a foundation school, meaning that the school is maintained by the local authority but the governors are responsible for their own admission policy and procedures.

Between July 2006 and July 2007 the school had extensive building works, in which a new sports hall and staff room were built.

Since converting to an academy in 2012, the school is run by the Chingford Academies Trust, which also manages South Chingford Foundation School. The current CEO of Chingford Foundation Trust is Rob Mammen who replaced Jane Benton in 2023. The current Head of the school is Gary Haines who accepted the post in September 2023.

== Inspections ==
In 2014, the school was inspected by Ofsted and judged Good. In 2019, it was judged to Require Improvement. As of 2024, the most recent inspection was in 2023, with a judgement of Good.

== Notable alumni ==
- James Alexandrou, actor, formerly in EastEnders
- Brian Altman, barrister
- David Beckham, former professional footballer for Manchester United, Real Madrid, Milan, LA Galaxy, Paris Saint-Germain and England.
- Daniel Clark, professional basketball player
- Ella Clark, professional basketball player
- Daniel Fogg, swimmer
- Brian Galach, professional footballer, Crawley Town, Poland International
- Dwight Gayle, professional footballer with Stoke City
- Peter Harding, former Marshal of the Royal Air Force, Royal Air Force Chief of the Air Staff, and Chief of Defence Staff (professional head of the British Armed Forces)
- Jonathan Ive, designer, Apple Computer
- Harry Kane, professional footballer for Bayern Munich and captain of the English national team.
- Michael Obafemi, professional footballer, Swansea City
- John Parslow, ornithologist
- Iain Rice, writer on model railways
- Faiza Shaheen, economist
- Steve Rosenberg, journalist, BBC's Moscow correspondent
