= Jennifer Owen =

British entomologist

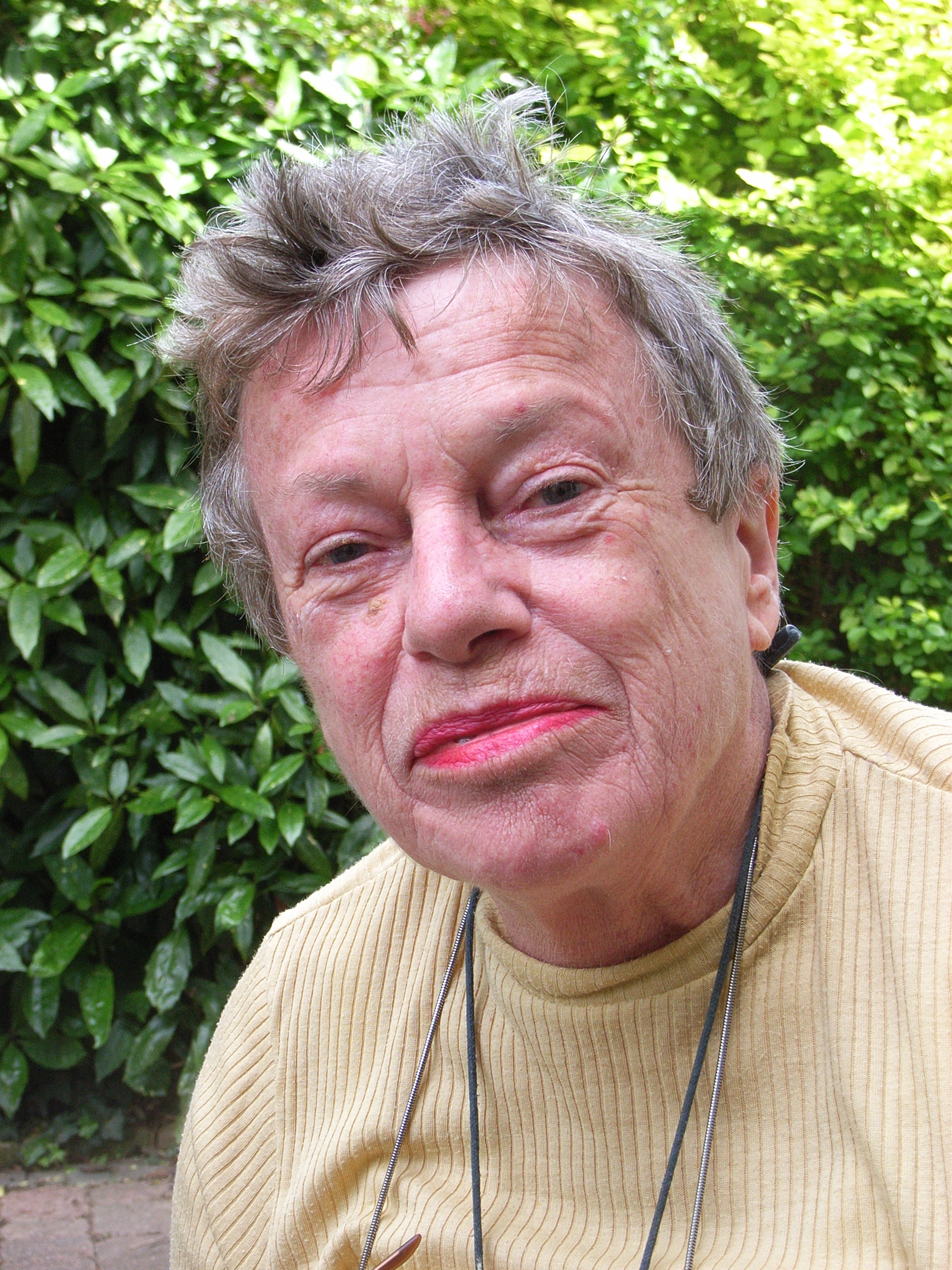
- Jennifer Owen in 2008
- Born: 9 November 1936; Leicester
- Education: University of Oxford
- Known for: Longitudinal study of flora and fauna in a domestic garden
- Awards: Veitch Memorial Medal (2010); Ecological Engagement Award; (2010)

Jennifer Owen (born 9 November 1936) was a British zoologist and ecologist. She led a 30 year wildlife study (1972–2001) in a single suburban midlands garden recording 2,673 species. Notably she did this without funding. Living with multiple sclerosis, she made her last recording in 2001. She is described as "one of the great heroines of the 20th-century environmental movement".

== Career ==
Jennifer Bak was the daughter of Kate and Frank Alan Bak. Her father was a noted amateur ornithologist and Leicester based textile manufacturer. She studied zoology at the University of Oxford in 1955. She studied under academics such as Charles Sutherland Elton and gradudated with a first class degree. At university she met Denis Owen. They married on 12 July 1958, after graduation, and together they had two children. She went to the University of Michigan to work as a teaching fellow and complete a research PhD on wasps. After her doctorate she took up teaching positions from 1962 in Makerere University, Uganda and Fourah Bay College, Sierra Leone as well as Sweden. While in Africa she noted that her garden had more species of butterfly than the nearby rainforest, due to hosting the savanna species too.

On Owen's return to the department of zoology at the University of Leicester in 1971 she noticed the large number of insects in her garden in the Humberstone suburb of Leicester, so she started to record them in 1972. Her home was a four bedroom, 1920s house at 66 Scraptoft Lane.

She wrote

"My husband, Denis Owen, and I started investigating in detail the flora and fauna (particularly insects) of our Leicester garden in 1971... It is probably fair to claim that more is known about our backyard than about any other area of similar size...In the United Kingdom there is widespread interest in natural history among people with no formal academic training. Lecturing to and writing for such an audience is very rewarding and, hence, enjoyable. I meet my most enthusiastic audiences when lecturing about garden wildlife, and this has led to my interest in and involvement with urban nature conservation."

Owen described her gardening process:

"My garden is, however, a fairly typical suburban garden, occupying 788 square yards (659 m') on a busy corner only 14 miles from the centre of Leicester. It incorporates the usual features: lawn, flower beds, vegetable patches, rockery, compost heap, an apple tree, various fruit bushes, flowering and evergreen shrubs, ornamental Prunus and exotic conifers. Some departures from conventional gardening practice enhance it as a habitat for insects: pruning and clearing of vegetation are kept to a minimum during summer and early autumn; plants with flowers known to be attractive to insects are encouraged; ground cover is maintained by either cultivated plants or 'weeds'; insecticides, herbicides and other poisons are rigorously excluded; and flowers and vegetables are interplanted, an ancient gardening practice believed to minimise pest outbreaks. Despite this, it is in no sense a wilderness; I grow vegetables, fruit and flowers for cutting, and there is space to sit and stroll. There is every reason to suppose, therefore, that the insect fauna of other gardens is equally abundant and varied."

Owens noted that her garden was in the centre of England, on the outskirts of a city, and so "a larger garden with greater structural diversity, near the coast or a large body of inland water, would have a far longer list" of inhabiting species than her own garden. She was one of the first ecologists to recognise the importance of gardens for wildlife, acknowledged in the title of a 1975 joint paper with Denis, which just focused on the butterflies (15 species), hoverflies (74 species) and ichneumonid wasps (455 species) she had recorded in their garden, followed by a later study on ichneumonids and hoverflies. Her broader results of garden monitoring were then presented in a popular book, Garden Life (1983). But after 15 years she was able to present a more complete picture in The Ecology of a Garden: The First Fifteen Years (1991), described by biologist Ken Thompson as "the most complete account of the wildlife of any garden anywhere in the world". It contained records of 2,204 species (1,782 animals and 422 plants) recorded from the garden.

A gardener crowds together in one place a far greater diversity
of plants than is ever found in one place in the wild.
Even in tropical rainforest an area equivalent to a typical garden
would not contain so many different plant species.

— Jennifer Owen

After 30 years of recording (1972–2001) she published an updated book, Wildlife of a Garden: A Thirty-Year Study (2010), which revealed a total of 2,673 species, including 533 species of ichneumonid wasp, 442 species of beetle, 375 species of moth, 183 species of bug, 94 species of hoverfly, as well as 474 species of native and garden plants and 64 species of vertebrate (54 of them birds). She recorded 20 invertebrate species new to Britain, four of which were previously undescribed. She discovered in her garden six species of parasitic wasps (Ichneumonidae) previously unknown to science. In Thompson’s words “Few enough of us would contemplate trying to assemble a complete inventory of the beetles, birds, butterflies (and a great deal else) in our gardens for even one year; to persist for 30 years is an achievement that will probably never be equalled". "It is estimated that had she the time and expertise available, the final tally would have been in excess of 8,000 species." In the 21st century, "the plot has endured the fate of so many of its neighbours. Once home to broad leaf trees, vegetables and a pond, it has been drained, felled and block-paved". In 1981 Owen wrote "The garden habitat, far from being threatened, is, if anything, expanding." However by 2025 half of UK garden space was paved over.

In 2010 Owen was awarded the Royal Horticultural Society's Veitch Memorial Medal for outstanding contribution to the advancement and improvement of the science and practice of horticulture and the British Ecological Society's Ecological Engagement Award.

The million acres of gardens in England and Wales,
and the suburban gardens in particular,
may well turn out to be our most important nature reserve.

— Jennifer Owen

== Personal life ==
Owen had a son and a daughter with Denis Owen. They divorced in 1994. In the 1980s she was diagnosed with multiple sclerosis and she was a wheelchair user in later life. She died on 8 November 2015 and is interred at Scraptoft Natural Burial Ground.

== Bibliography ==
- Owen, J. 1982. Feeding Strategy. University of Chicago Press ISBN 978-0-226-64186-7
- Owen, J. 1983. Garden Life. Chatto & Windus ISBN 978-0-70112-610-0
- Owen, J. 1984. Mysteries and Marvels of Insect Life. EDC Publishing ISBN 978-0-88110-173-7
- Owen, J. 1991. The Ecology of a Garden: The First Fifteen Years. Cambridge University Press ISBN 978-0-521-34335-0
- Owen, J. 2010. Wildlife of a Garden: A Thirty-year Study. Royal Horticultural Society ISBN 978-1-907057-12-0
