= Parmiter's School =

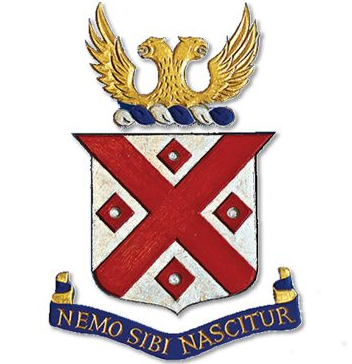

Location
- High Elms Lane; Garston, Hertfordshire, WD25 0UU; England; 51.703°N 0.389°W

Information
- Type: Academy
- Motto: Nemo Sibi Nascitur (Latin: "No one is born unto themselves alone")
- Established: 1722 and 1887 in Bethnal Green; 1977 in current site
- Founder: Thomas Parmiter
- Local authority: Hertfordshire
- Department for Education URN: 136899 Tables
- Ofsted: Reports
- Chair of Governors: Andy O’Brien
- Headteacher: Anthony Smith
- Staff: 80 teaching, 50 support
- Gender: Mixed
- Age: 11 to 18
- Enrolment: 260 (Sixth Form); 1452 (total)
- Houses: 6–
- Colours: Burgundy , Sky Blue , White and Navy Blue
- Website: http://www.parmiters.herts.sch.uk/

Parmiter's School is a co-educational state comprehensive school with academy status in Garston, Hertfordshire, close to the outskirts of North West London, England with a long history. Although the school admits pupils of all abilities, it is partially selective. As of 2023, it was the most oversubscribed school in Hertfordshire.

== History ==
=== Beginnings ===
Thomas Parmiter was a wealthy silk merchant in East London, who died in 1681. He left two farms in southwest Suffolk in his will to provide £30 per annum for six almshouses and £100 per annum for "one free school house or room for ten poor children" in Bethnal Green, London. Elizabeth Carter donated land for the school and an annual income of £10, while William Lee donated £100 for the building of a school house and a further annual £10. The building in St John Street (now Grimsby Street) was completed in 1722. The Trustees of Thomas Parmiter's Estate bought property in Cambridge Heath, London in 1723.

By 1730 the school accommodated 30 boys, growing to 50 in 1809. In 1839 it moved to new premises in Gloucester Street (now Parmiter Street) after the original site was acquired by the Eastern Counties Railway. Unfortunately these buildings were destroyed by bombing during World War II. Peter Renvoize left the foundation the sum of £500 on his death in 1842.

In 1870, the Great Eastern Railway acquired most of the Cambridge Heath property for the sum of £27,000. The Charity Commission, acting under the Endowed Schools Act 1869, forced a new constitution on the foundation, directing one third of the income to the almshouses and two-thirds to the school, which was by this time providing secondary education to 70 boys. Fees were to be introduced, with 40 foundation scholarships for boys from the parish of St Matthew's, Bethnal Green.

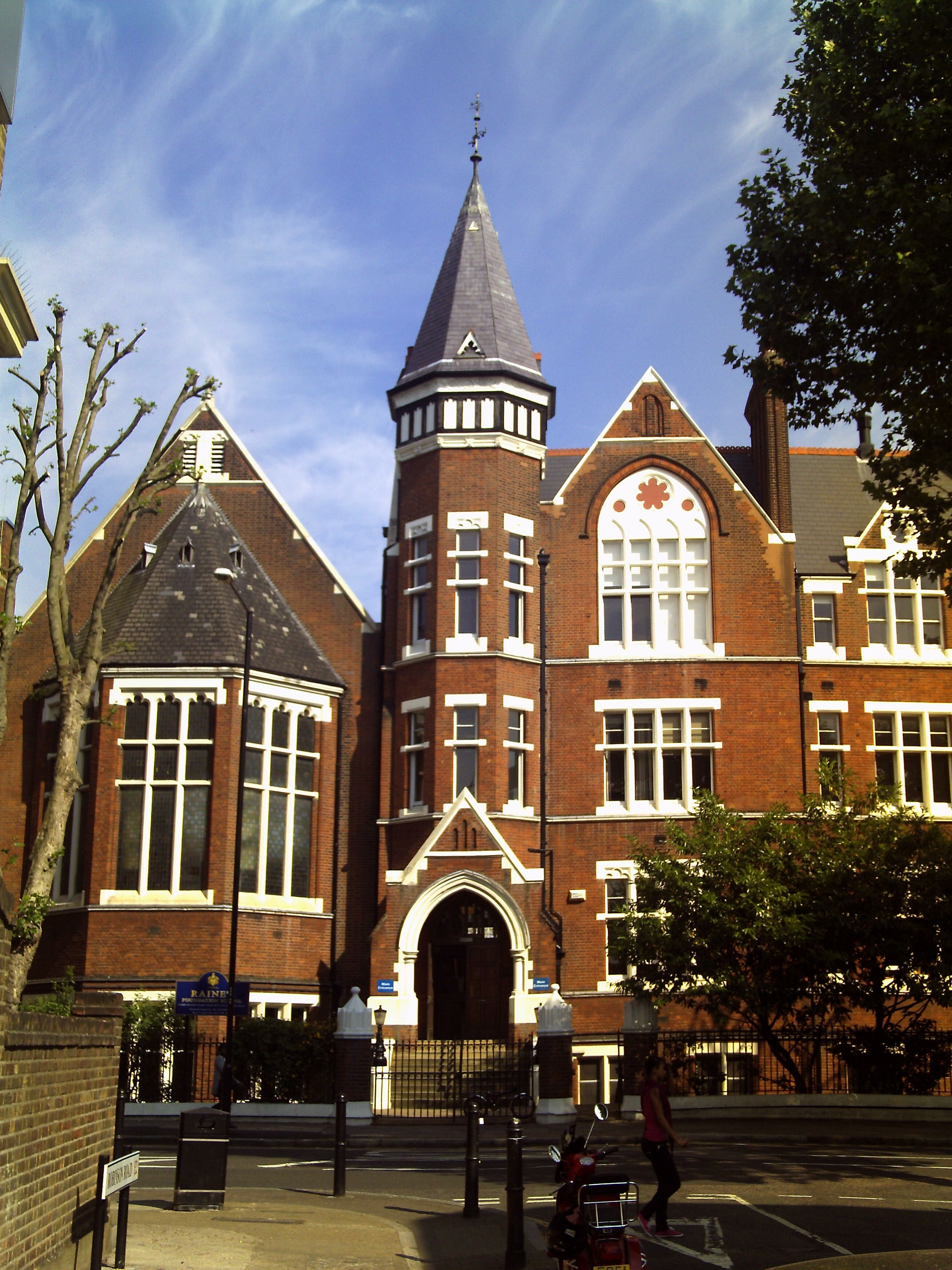
Part of the building occupied by Parmiter's School in Approach Road, Bethnal Green. It was later Raine's Foundation School, and is currently unoccupied.

The Gloucester Street school closed in 1885, reopening in new buildings in Approach Road (51.5312°N 0.0511°W) in 1887. In 1913 a revised constitution created separate foundations for the school and the almshouses. The Parmiter phoenix was designed by W.A. Cross for the 40th anniversary of the Approach Road school in 1927. In 1951 the school became a voluntary aided grammar school. In 1966 and 1967 it successfully resisted plans by the Inner London Education Authority to merge it with St Jude's Church of England School to form a comprehensive school. Parmiter's Grammar School had grown to 525 boys by 1976, but the days of the grammar school were numbered.

=== New campus, new era ===
The school moved to Garston, Hertfordshire as a mixed comprehensive school in 1977. The grammar school in Bethnal Green closed in the same year. The school acquired grant maintained status in 1991, and returned to voluntary aided status in September 1999.

In April 2010, Parmiter's School hosted Any Questions?, a topical debate on the elections, broadcast on BBC Radio 4.

== Academic performance and reputation ==
The Financial Times Secondary School rankings 2011 showed Parmiter's in 278th place out of 2,190 schools.

The Evening Standard places Parmiter's School in 54th place out of 269 state schools in south-east England in 2010 based upon GCSE and A-Level results.

The Ofsted inspection in July 2024 found that "The School's purposeful pursuit of excellence and academic rigour enables pupils to excel".

== Sports ==
In 1997 the Year 12 football team reached the final of the English Schools' Football Association National Cup, the title being shared with Monkseaton High School after a 0-0 draw and again in both 2005 and 2006, narrowly losing twice.

== Admissions ==
The school may admit up to 25% of pupils based on academic ability, and up to 10% on musical aptitude, once other admission criteria such as those relating to looked after children and siblings of existing pupils have been met.

== Notable former pupils ==
Former pupils of the boys' grammar school in Bethnal Green:

- Tom Burns (professor of sociology, wrote studies of the BBC and corporations)
- John Cartwright (former West Ham Utd footballer, later controversial England youth coach)
- Sir Terence Clark (British diplomat and writer)
- John Crow (former governor of the Bank of Canada)
- Alp Mehmet (UK ambassador to Iceland)
- Emanuel Miller (British psychiatrist)
- Dave Pearson (painter)
- Iain Rice (writer on model railways)
- Graham Stilwell (England No. 2 tennis player)
- Alfie Stokes (professional footballer)
- Tommy Walsh (TV gardener, Ground Force)
- Geoffrey Woolley (Victoria Cross recipient) attended the school up to the age of 10.

Former pupils of the mixed comprehensive school in Hertfordshire:

- Asha Banks (English actress)
- Nathan Byrne (English footballer)
- Captain Everything! (punk rock band)
- Tom Carroll (English footballer)
- Will Cozens (The Capital FM Network Radio DJ)
- Harry Crawford (Southend United F.C. professional footballer)
- Oliver Dowden (Member of Parliament for Hertsmere, former Deputy Prime Minister of the United Kingdom)
- Connor Emerton (cricketer)
- Steven Finn (Middlesex and England cricketer)
- Nick Leeson (responsible for the bankruptcy of Barings Bank)
- Jordan Parkes (former Watford F.C.)
- Kelly Somers (sports journalist)
- Anthony Zboralski (French hacker and internet entrepreneur)
- Alexei Rojas (Arsenal youth academy and Colombia youth international footballer)
