= Owenus =

Scientific classification
- Kingdom: Animalia
- Phylum: Arthropoda
- Class: Insecta
- Order: Hymenoptera
- Family: Ichneumonidae
- Subfamily: Cryptinae
- Tribe: Cryptini
- Subtribe: Goryphina
- Genus: Owenus; Townes, 1970

Species
- See text

Genus of wasps

Owenus is a genus of ichneumonid wasp, named for Denis Owen.

== Species ==
The genus has four species:

- Owenus cingulatus (Kriechbaumer, 1894)
- Owenus crocator (Tosquinet, 1896)
- Owenus minor Townes, 1970
- Owenus variegatus (Morley, 1916)
