= Wytham =

Village in Oxfordshire, England

Coordinates: 51.778°N 1.313°W

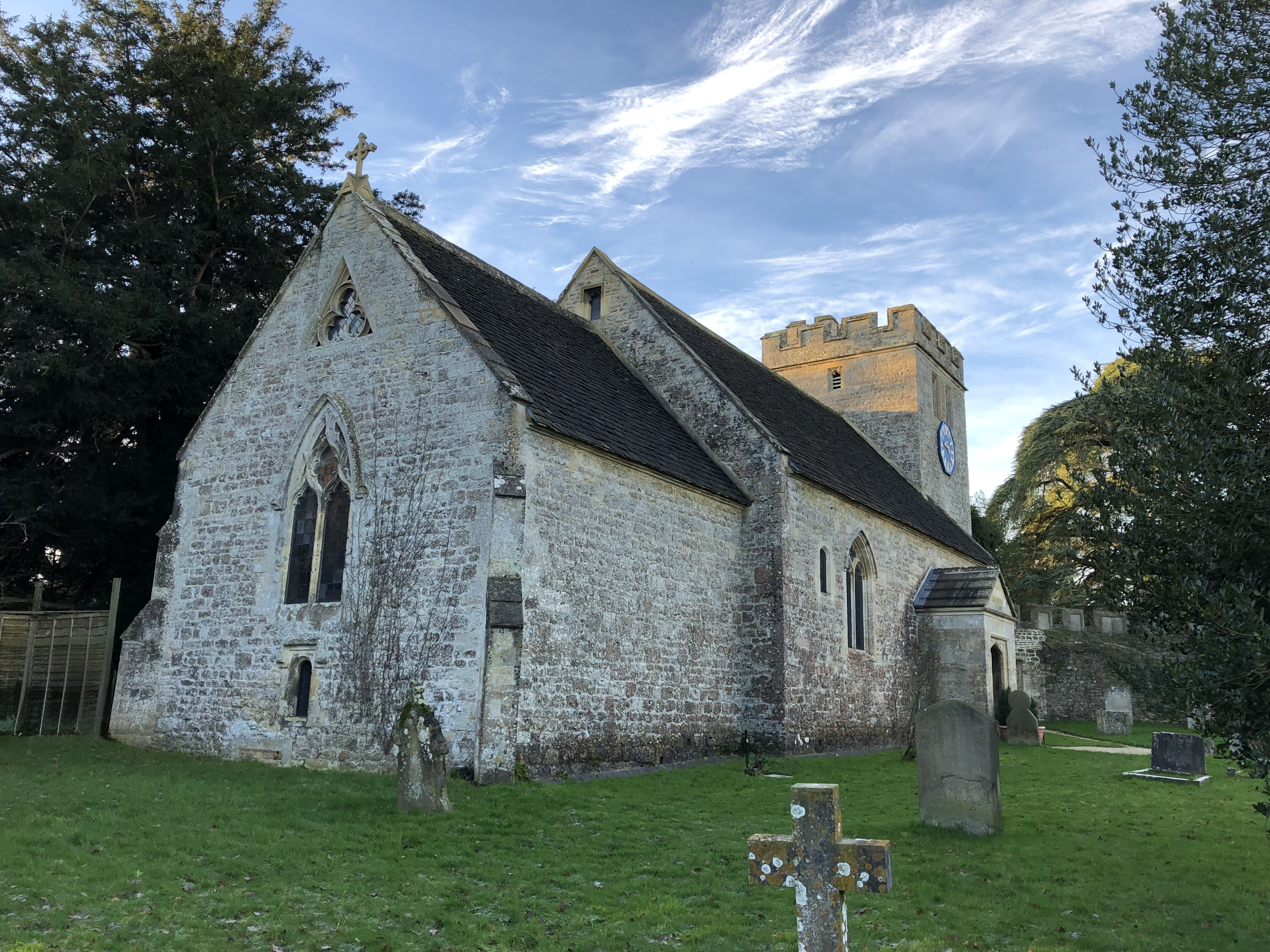
- All Saints' parish church

- Location within Oxfordshire
- Population: 131 (2001 census)
- OS grid reference: SP4708
- Civil parish: Wytham
- District: Vale of White Horse
- Shire county: Oxfordshire
- Region: South East
- Country: England
- Sovereign state: United Kingdom
- Post town: Oxford
- Postcode district: OX2
- Dialling code: 01865
- Police: Thames Valley
- Fire: Oxfordshire
- Ambulance: South Central
- UK Parliament: Oxford West and Abingdon
- Website: wytham.org

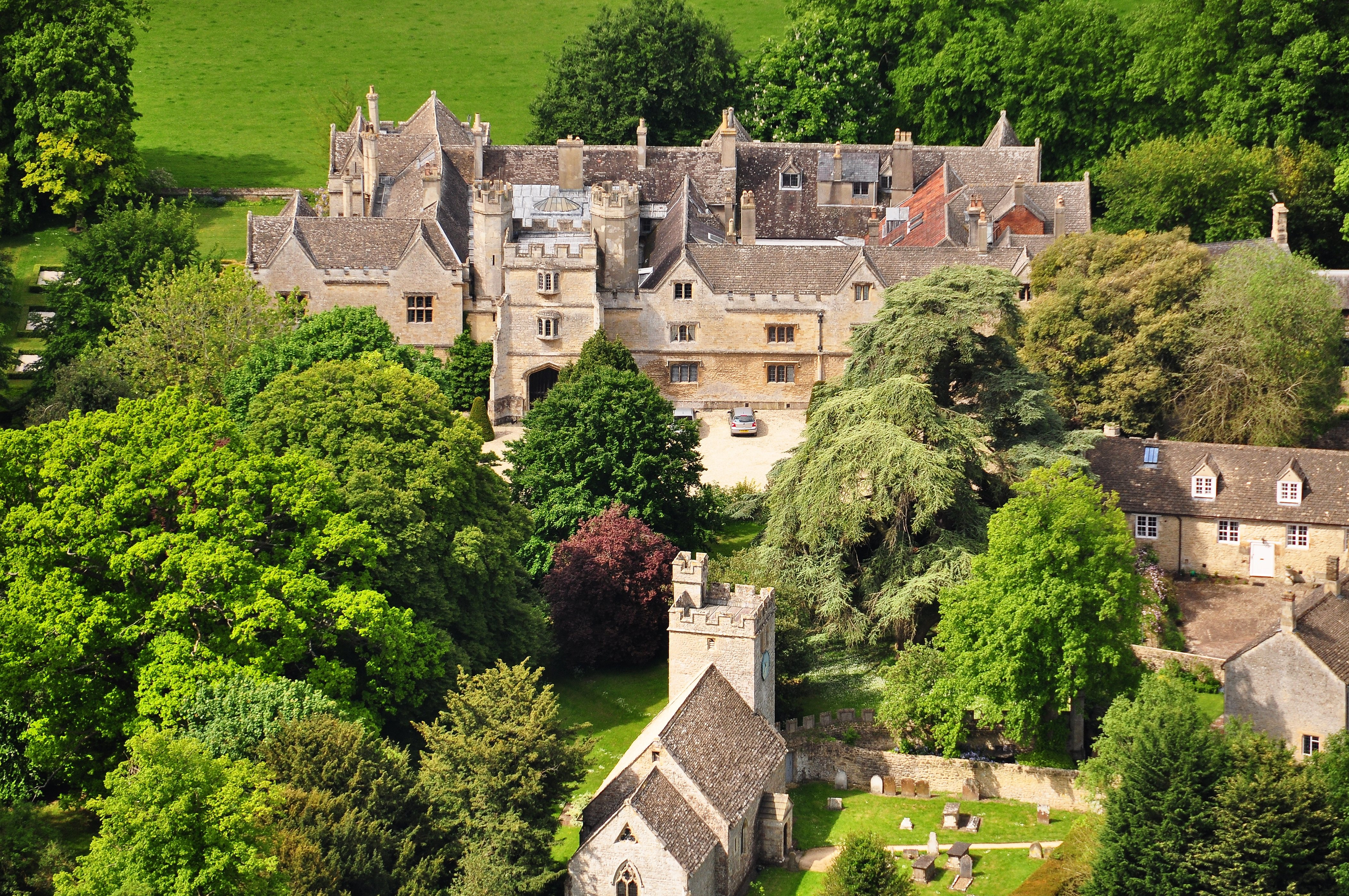
Wytham Abbey from the air

Wytham (/ˈwaɪtəm/ WY-təm) is a village and civil parish on the Seacourt Stream, a branch of the River Thames, about 3 miles (5 km) northwest of the centre of Oxford. It is just west of the Western By-Pass Road, part of the Oxford Ring Road (A34). The nearest village is Godstow. Wytham was the northernmost part of Berkshire until the 1974 boundary changes transferred it to Oxfordshire.

== Etymology ==
Wytham derives its name from the Anglo Saxon Witta's Home, and has been inhabited since around 500 BCE. The toponym is first recorded as Wihtham around 957, and comes from the Old English for a homestead or village in a river-bend.

== History of the manor ==
The manor of Wytham, along with Wytham Abbey (not a religious foundation but the manor house) and much of the village, was formerly owned by the Earls of Abingdon. The Church of England parish church of All Saints was originally a medieval building but it was extensively rebuilt between 1811 and 1812 by Montagu Bertie, 5th Earl of Abingdon. The ruins of the former Godstow Nunnery lie just east of the village.

== The 20th century ==
In the 1920s, The 9th Earl of Abingdon sold the Wytham Estate – comprising not just the Abbey but most of the houses in the village and approximately 2,500 acres of park, farm and woodland, including Wytham Great Wood – to Colonel Raymond ffennell, who had made a fortune in South Africa and changed his name from Schumacher on arrival in England, and his wife Hope (née Weigall). During World War II they agreed to take in six East End children as part of the evacuee programme. After the war, they gifted the entire Wytham Estate to the University of Oxford – the largest bequest to the university since the Middle Ages. The Abbey was subsequently sold by the University of Oxford in 1991 and is now in private hands.

== Wytham Great Wood ==
Wytham Woods is an area of long-established mixed woodland noted for its high population of badgers and long-term monitoring of great tits. It is on rising ground to the west of the village and covers 1000 acres. The woods are a Site of Special Scientific Interest. The University of Oxford has owned the woods since 1942 and uses them for research in zoology and climate change. The university has a field station north of the village. It is claimed to be one of the most researched pieces of woodland in the world. The woods are open to the public by permit which are available on application, for walking but are closed to dogs, horses and bicycles.

A named path within the wood is called the Singing Way. It is aligned with Oxford and got its name because monks on pilgrimage from Cirencester to Canterbury would break into song here as they sighted the town and the end of their day's journey. On 7 October 2017 an Oxfordshire Blue Plaque was unveiled at the Keeper's Hill car park in Wytham Woods, commemorating the bequest of the woods to the University of Oxford in 1942 by Raymond and Hope ffennell.

== Inspector Morse ==
Wytham village and Wytham Woods have frequently featured in the "Inspector Morse" detective novels by Colin Dexter, most notably in The Way Through the Woods.

== Gallery ==
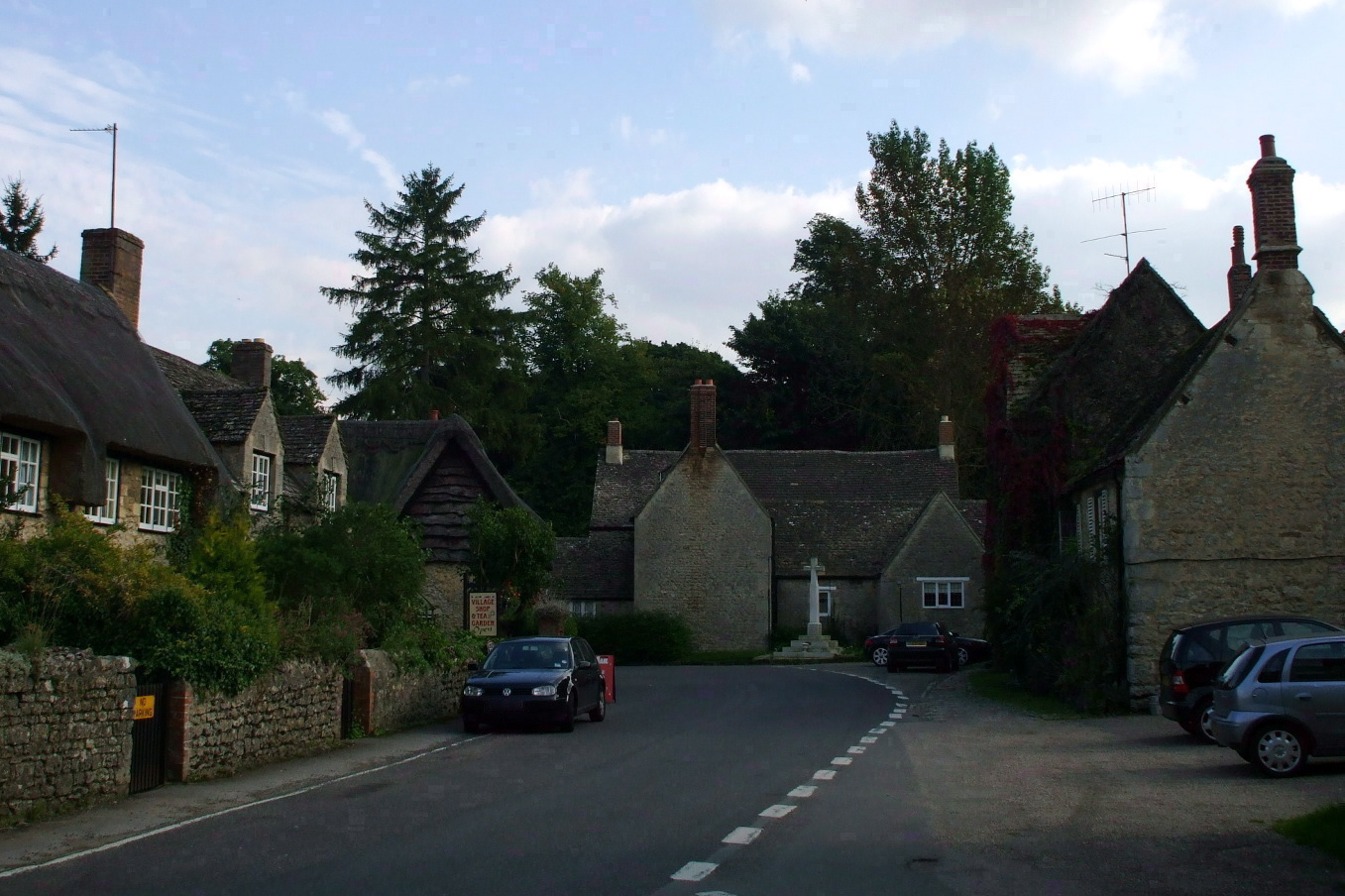
The centre of Wytham, with the village shop on the left and the White Hart pub on the right

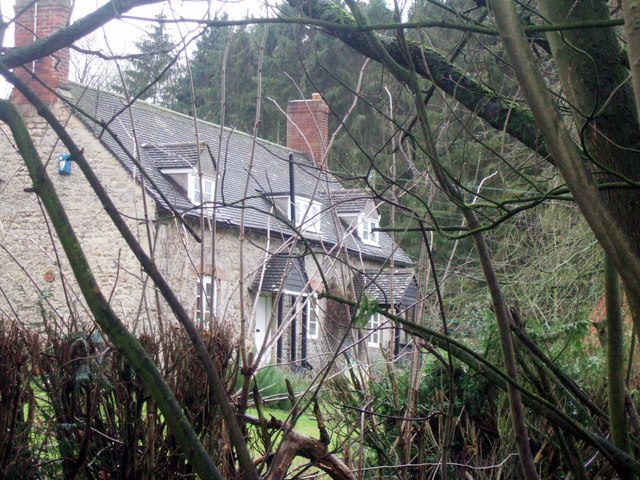
Keepers Cottage, Wytham Woods, a gift to the University of Oxford in 1943

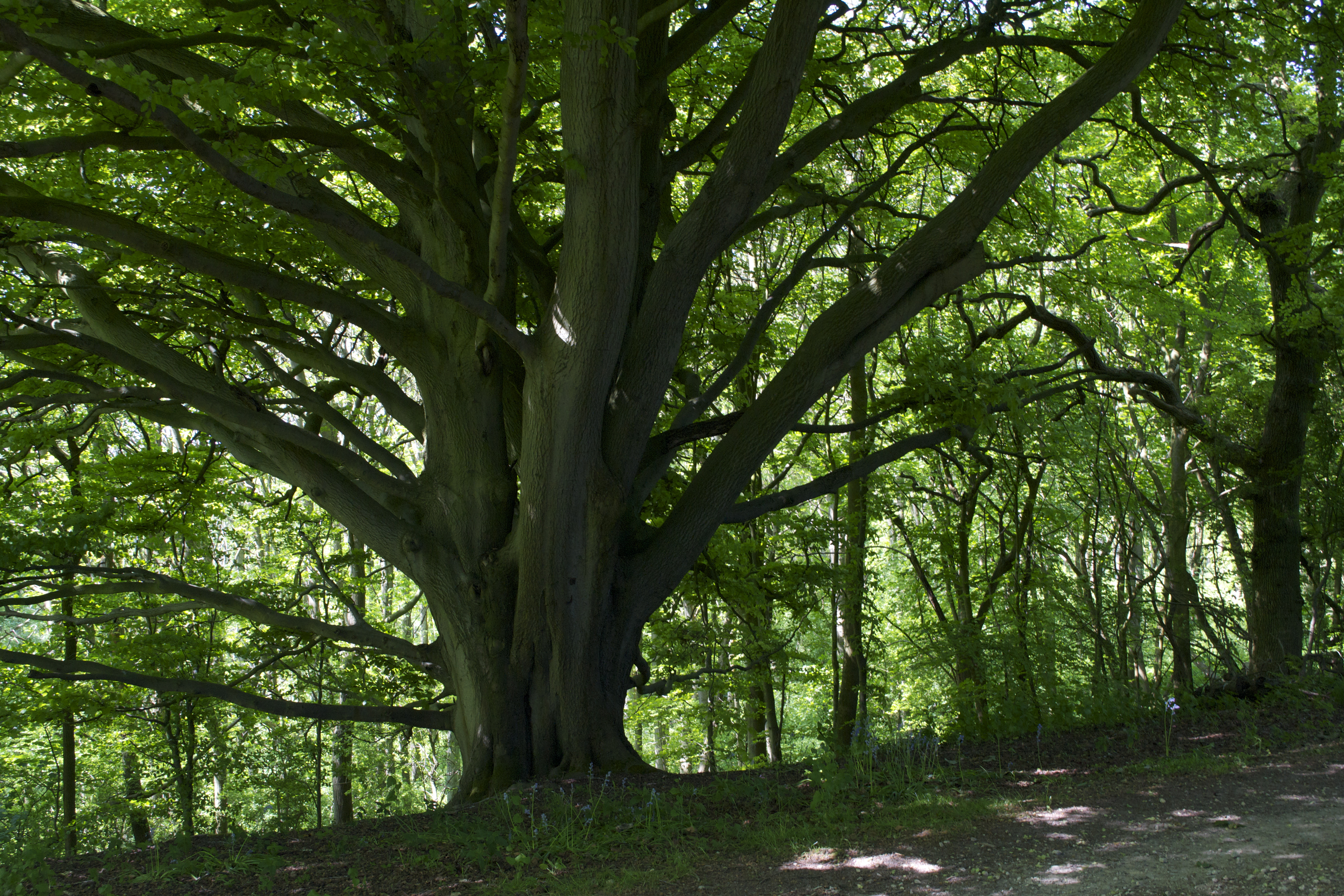
Ancient tree in Wytham Great Wood

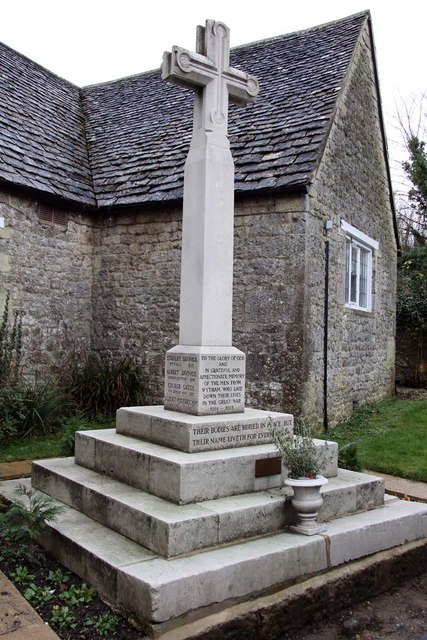
Wytham War Memorial

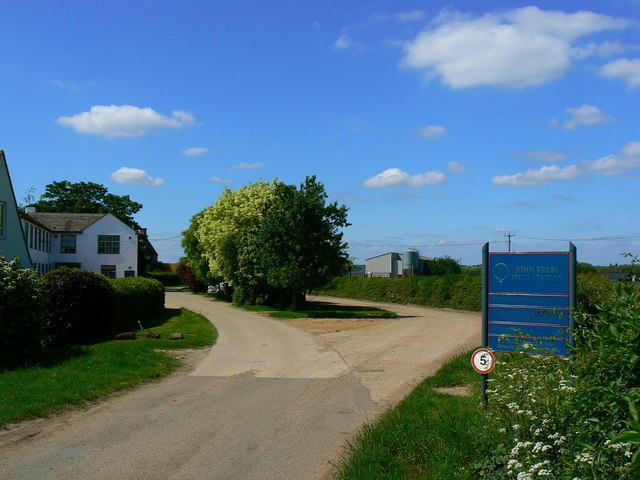
Oxford University's John Krebs Field Station, Wytham
