= Ken Thompson (botanist) =

British botanist and writer

Ken Thompson is a botanist and writer of popular books on botany. He is a retired Senior Research Fellow of Sheffield University and has written for the Daily Telegraph. He is also an editor for the journal Functional Ecology.

== Academic career ==
Thompson "devised the widely-used scheme for classifying soil seed banks and is the author of the standard work on European soil seed banks. While retaining an interest in all aspects of seed ecology, he has published widely on almost all aspects of plant ecology, particularly on plant functional types, commonness and rarity, invasive plants, urban ecology and prediction of the response of regional and national floras to changing climate and land use."

Thompson is noted for "ideas that you will be inspired by and interested in discovering more about". Some of his ideas include:

- "The best single thing you can do for wildlife in your garden is to find a young tree and leave it alone. Failing that, plant one.
- "Long grass is good for wildlife, and in short supply in gardens."
- "Maintaining soil carbon is easy: make as much compost as you can..."

== Selected bibliography ==
- No Nettles Required: The Reassuring Truth about Wildlife Gardening. Eden Project Books. 2006. ISBN 978-1903919682.
- Do We Need Pandas?: The Uncomfortable Truth About Biodiversity. Green Books. 2010. ISBN 978-1900322867.
- Where Do Camels Belong?: The Story and Science of Invasive Species. Profile Books. 2015. ISBN 978-1781251751.
- Darwin's Most Wonderful Plants. Profile Books. 2018. ISBN 978-1788160285.
