= BIOS Scientific Publishers =

- Status: Defunct
- Founded: 1989
- Defunct: 14 February 2012
- Successor: Taylor & Francis
- Country of origin: United Kingdom
- Headquarters location: Milton Park, England
- Publication types: Books, academic journals
- Nonfiction topics: biosciences

BIOS Scientific Publishers was an English publisher. The main offices were based at Milton Park near Abingdon, Oxfordshire, south of Oxford, England. The company specialised in biosciences.

Taylor & Francis acquired BIOS Scientific Publishers in 2003; the imprint closed in 2005.
