= Department of Zoology, University of Oxford =

Department of Zoology
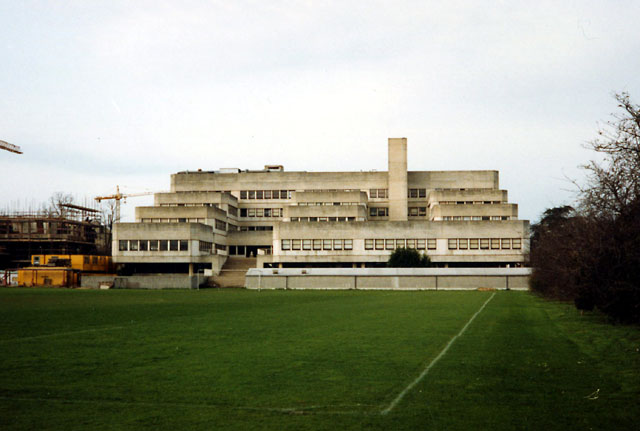
- The Tinbergen Building was demolished in 2017, and housed the former Department of Zoology. Building works for the Life and Mind Building is currently underway in the same location, and will house the Department of Biology.
- Merged into: Department of Plant Sciences
- Successor: Department of Biology
- Formation: 1860
- Dissolved: 2022
- Website: www.zoo.ox.ac.uk

The Department of Zoology was a former academic department at the Mathematical, Physical and Life Sciences Division at the University of Oxford in Oxford, England, United Kingdom. It was founded in 1860. It was merged with the Department of Plant Sciences to form the Department of Biology on 1 August 2022.

Many distinguished scientists worked in the department at various stages in their careers, including three Nobel Laureates (Peter Medawar, Niko Tinbergen, and Sir John Gurdon), three winners of the Crafoord Prize (Bill Hamilton, Ilkka Hanski, Bob May), the Kyoto Prize (Bill Hamilton) and Blue Planet Prize (Bob May), as well as four winners of the Copley Medal (the Royal Society's premier research award).

== History ==
The Department of Zoology was housed in the Tinbergen Building in Oxford, designed in 1965 by Sir Leslie Martin (who also designed the Royal Festival Hall) and opened in 1971, the Tinbergen Building was a large Modernist building housing over 1,600 staff and students. It was Oxford University's largest building.

In February 2017, university officials announced that the Tinbergen Building would be closed for two years and all research and teaching activities of the Zoology Department would be moved elsewhere. This was due to the discovery of more asbestos than had been previously known; too much than could be removed during necessary maintenance with the building remaining occupied.

On the 1 August 2022 the Department of Zoology merged with the Department of Plant Sciences to form the Department of Biology. The Department of Biology currently primarily located in various places, including temporary accommodation at 11a Mansfield Road and on South Parks Road.

The Tinbergen Building was demolished in spring 2020. It is to be replaced by a new £200m, 26,000 sq/m building, named the Life & Mind Building, scheduled to open in 2024. Planning permission was granted in early 2021. On completion, the building will house the Department of Biology and the Department of Experimental Psychology at the University of Oxford.
