= David Lack =

British evolutionary biologist

David Lack FRS
- Lack in 1966, photo by Eric Hosking
- Born: David Lambert Lack; 16 July 1910; London, England
- Died: 12 March 1973 (aged 62)
- Education: University of Cambridge
- Known for: Lack's principle; Darwin's Finches
- Spouse: Elizabeth Lack
- Children: 4, including Andrew Lack
- Awards: Godman-Salvin Medal (1958); Darwin Medal (1972)
- Scientific career
- Fields: Ornithology
- Workplaces: University of Oxford; Edward Grey Institute of Field Ornithology
- Doctoral students: Monica M. Betts; David W. Snow; John Alexander Gibb; William J.L. Sladen; Philip Ashmole; Robert Hinde; Ian Newton; Chris Perrins; Bernard Stonehouse
- Other notable students: Robert H. MacArthur

David Lambert Lack FRS (16 July 1910 – 12 March 1973) was a British evolutionary biologist who made contributions to ornithology, ecology, and ethology. His 1947 book, Darwin's Finches, on the finches of the Galapagos Islands was a landmark work as were his other popular science books on Life of the Robin and Swifts in a Tower. He developed what is now known as Lack's Principle which explained the evolution of avian clutch sizes in terms of individual selection as opposed to the competing contemporary idea that they had evolved for the benefit of species (also known as group selection). His pioneering life-history studies of the living bird helped in changing the nature of ornithology from what was then a collection-oriented field. He was a longtime director of the Edward Grey Institute of Field Ornithology at the University of Oxford.

== Education and early life ==
Lack was born in London, the oldest of four children of Harry Lambert Lack MD FRCS, who later became President of the British Medical Association. The name 'Lack' is derived from 'Lock.' His father grew up in a farming family from Norfolk and became a leading ear, nose, and throat surgeon at the London Hospital. Although his father had some interest in birds as a boy, it does not appear that he influenced David's interest. His mother Kathleen was the daughter of Lt. Col. McNeil Rind of the Indian army. Kathleen's father was Scottish and on her mother's side she was part Irish, Greek, and Georgian. Kathleen had been an actor and was a supporter of women's suffrage. At home they organized meetings of the poetry society. David was schooled at home until seven and then went to the Open Air School in Regent's Park before going to The Hall, Hampstead, followed by Foster's School, Stubbington and Gresham's School, Holt, Norfolk. Lack was taught biology at Gresham's by W.H. Foy and G.H. Lockett. He went to Magdalene College, Cambridge and received a BA second class in 1933 after studying botany, zoology and geology for part I of the Tripos and zoology for part II.

Until the age of fifteen, Lack lived in a large house in Devonshire Place, London. The family spent their summers in New Romney Kent where Lack became familiar with the local birds especially on Romney Marsh. By the age of nine, he had learnt the names of most birds and had written out an alphabetically arranged life-list. In 1926, Lack won the Holland-Martin Natural History Prize for an essay on "Three Birds of Kelling Heath". In 1928, with an essay on 'My favourite birds' he was the national winner of the senior prize (a silver medal) in the Public School Essay Competition, organised by the Royal Society for the Protection of Birds. David did not wish to follow his father's profession in medicine and took an interest in zoology. His father then considered entomology, which was then the only professional field in zoology and found work for David at the Frankfurt museum in the summer of 1929. He spent four months pinning insects in the Senckenberg Museum and found it “extremely” boring. He joined the Cambridge Ornithological Club whose members included Peter Scott, Arthur Duncan, Dominic Serventy, and Tom Harrisson. His first scientific paper was on the display of nightjars, published in the Ibis in 1932. He joined on several expeditions with Cambridge researchers, including two to the Arctic. Lack wrote The Birds of Cambridgeshire (1934) which was published by the Cambridge Bird Club. In this work, he departed from the contemporary style with a distinct de-emphasis on rare and accidental birds.

Lack received an Sc.D. from Cambridge University in 1948.

== Career and research ==
After Cambridge, Lack, on the recommendation of Julian Huxley took up a position as a science mentor at Dartington Hall School, Devon from 1934 until Summer 1938, when he took a year off to study bird behaviour on the Galapagos Islands. In 1935 he made his first trip to the United States as a chaperone for a Dartington Hall student returning to California. Here he met Joseph Grinnell and Robert McCabe and gave a talk at the Cooper Ornithological Club. In New York, he met Ernst Mayr at the American Museum of Natural History. He returned via the SS Bremen, only one of about four English speakers on the German ship. He was only in the Galapagos for part of that year, starting August 1938. With the data that he collected in the Galapagos, especially on the finches, he went to the United States. April to August 1939 was spent at the California Academy of Sciences which held a large collection of the finches of Galapagos that had been studied earlier by Harry Swarth and at Ernst Mayr's home in New Jersey. While in the US he made a study of the tricoloured blackbird with John T. Emlen. He returned home in September 1939, after the outbreak of war. Lack published The Galapagos Finches (Geospizinae), A Study in Variation in which he examined variations within species across islands and considered that many of them were non-adaptive and due to founder effect and genetic drift. Lack's first major work was The Life of the Robin, which was based on four years of field work that he conducted while teaching at Dartington Hall School. He examined robin behaviour, song, territory, pairing, and breeding using ringing to mark and track individual birds. The manuscript was completed in 1942 and it went through five editions from 1943 to 1970. One of Lack's students at Dartington Hall was Eva Ibbotson. A colleague who helped in filming some of the robins for Lack was the geography teacher Bill Hunter. In 1934 Lack went to Tanganyika on an invitation from R.E. Moreau.

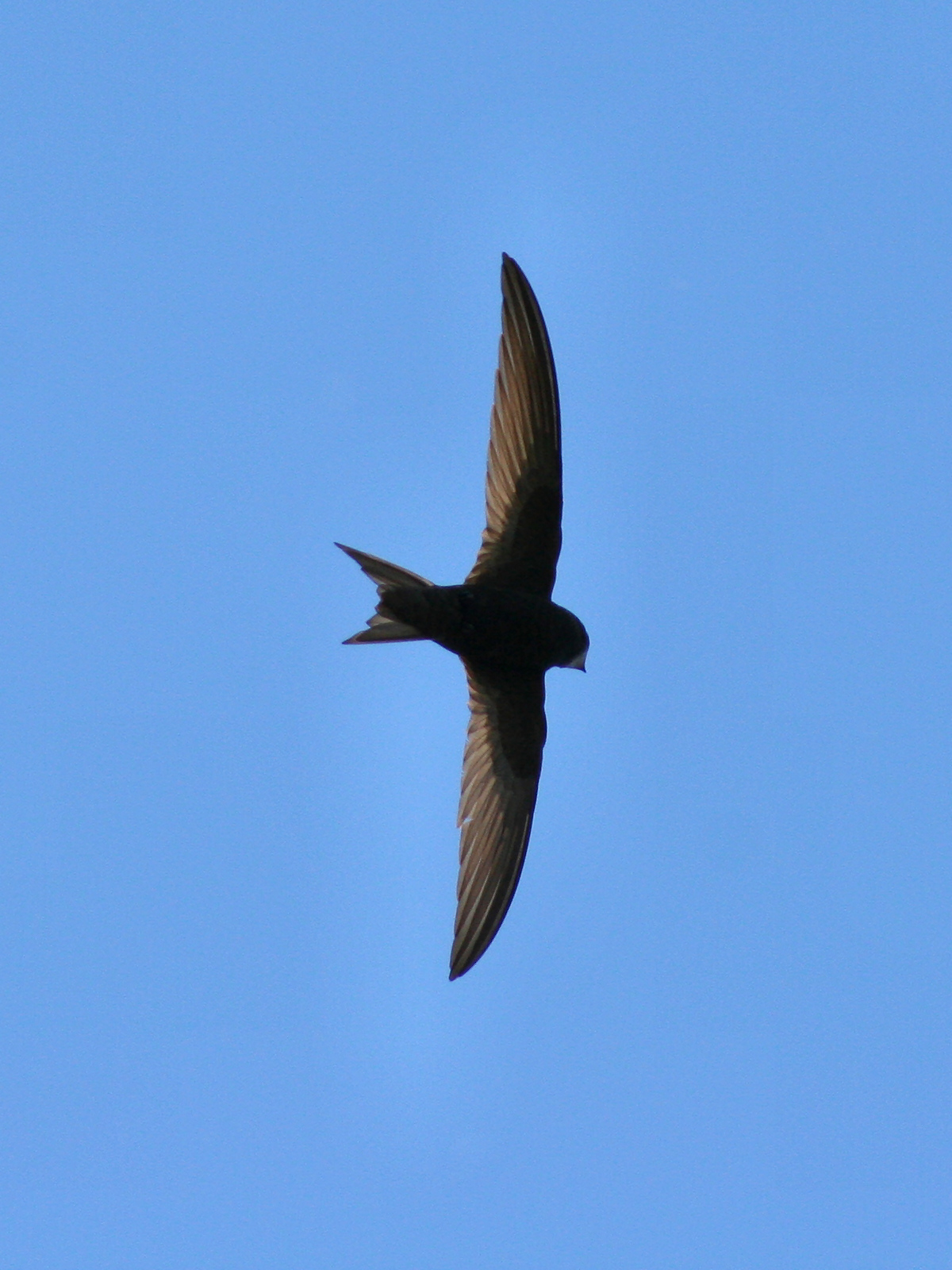
The Common Swift, one of many subjects studied by Lack.

Lack was committed to pacifism and debated the philosophy even during his Dartington days with the founder of the college, Leonard Knight Elmhirst. During World War II Lack however served with a British Army unit called the Army Operational Research Group on the Orkney Islands, working on radar use. During this work he met other biologists who had been inducted into the war including George Varley, an entomologist who introduced him to the idea of density-dependent regulation of animal populations. Lack's observations on spurious echoes produced by birds would later allow him to establish the field of radar ornithology to study bird migration. Lack was released from wartime duty in August 1945 so as to take a position to as Director (succeeding W.B. Alexander) of the Edward Grey Institute of Field Ornithology at Oxford University, a position that he held until his death in 1973.

Lack's work in ornithology was almost entirely based on studies of the living bird. He was one of the pioneers of life-history studies in Britain, especially those based on quantitative approaches, when some traditional ornithologists of the time were focusing their studies on morphology and geographic distribution. Lack's major scientific research included work on population biology and density dependent regulation. His work suggested that natural selection favoured clutch sizes that ensured the greatest number of surviving young. This interpretation was however debated by V.C. Wynne-Edwards who suggested that clutch size was density-independent. This was one of the earliest debates on group selection. Lack's studies were based on nidicolous birds and some recent studies have suggested that his findings may not hold for other groups such as seabirds.

As a mentor for numerous doctoral students, Lack followed a hands-off method, letting students decide their own research topics. He encouraged students to sort out their ideas and find the "simplest explanation, which was probably best." He would make students work on their papers and give only one reading to their thesis asking them to choose either a draft or a final version to submit.

He wrote numerous papers in ornithological journals, and had a knack of choosing memorable titles; he once claimed to have single-handedly caused the renaming of a group of birds through the submission of a scientific paper with the title "Territory and Polygamy in a Bishop". This 1935 publication was subsequently titled "Territory and polygamy in a bishop bird, Euplectes hordeacea hordeacea (Linn.)" in the journal Ibis as the journal editor felt that the title might cause misunderstanding.

=== Darwin's finches ===
Lack's most famous work is Darwin's Finches, a landmark study whose title linked Darwin's name with the Galapagos group of species and popularised the term "Darwin's finches" in 1947, though the term had been introduced by Percy Lowe in 1936. There are two versions of this work, differing significantly in their conclusions. The first is a book-length monograph, written after his visit to the Galapagos, but not published until 1945. In it, Lack interprets the differences in bill size as species recognition signals, that is, as isolating mechanisms.

The second is the later book in which the differences in bill size are interpreted as adaptations to specific food niches, an interpretation that has since been abundantly confirmed. This change of mind, according to Lack's Preface, came about as a result of his reflections on his own data whilst he was doing war work. The effect of this change in interpretation is to put the emphasis for speciation onto natural selection for appropriate food handling instead of seeing it primarily as a by-product of an isolating mechanism. In this way, his work contributed to the modern evolutionary synthesis, in which natural selection came to be seen as the prime mover in evolution and not random or mutational events. Lack's work laid the foundations for the much more extensive work of Peter and Rosemary Grant and their colleagues. Lack's work feeds into studies of island biogeography which continue the same range of issues presented by the Galapagos fauna on a more varied canvas. According to Ernst Mayr,

"The person who more than anyone else deserves credit for reviving an interest in the ecological significance of species was David Lack... It is now quite clear that the process of speciation is not completed by the acquisition of isolating mechanisms but requires also the acquisition of adaptations that permit co-existence with potential competitors."

=== Lack's Principle ===
In 1943 Lack took an interest in clutch size after reading Moreau's manuscript sent to the Ibis. Lack was then an assistant to the editor of the Ibis. Lack postulated what is now known as Lack's Principle, which states that "the clutch size of each species of bird has been adapted by natural selection to correspond with the largest number of young for which the parents can, on average, provide enough food".

=== Population regulation ===
Lack took a keen interest in the mechanisms involved in regulating populations in nature. The Natural Regulation of Animal Numbers is one of Lack's most frequently cited works. Here he gave primacy to natural selection in determining the rate of reproduction, and he especially countered the idea that it was adjusted with mortality rates so that constant populations are maintained. It was critiqued by J.B.S. Haldane who found it lacking mathematical precision and biased to bird studies. The other major critic was V.C. Wynne-Edwards with whom he clashed for nearly a decade. Lack followed up on the criticisms in his later books, including Population Studies of Birds (1966).

=== Published books ===
- Lack, David. 1943. The Life of the Robin. Witherby, London. ISBN 978-1843681304 (4th edition, 1965, illustrated by Robert Gillmor)
- Lack, David. 1947. Darwin's Finches.
- Lack, David. 1950. Robin Redbreast. Oxford. (A new edition of this book, revised and expanded by Lack's son Andrew, was published under the title Redbreast: the Robin in life and literature by SMH Books in 2008.) ISBN 9780955382727
- Lack, David. 1954. The Natural Regulation of Animal Numbers. Oxford University Press, Oxford. ISBN 978-1299428287
- Lack, David. 1956. Swifts in a Tower. Methuen, London. ISBN 0412121700
  - 2018 Updated edition, illustrated by Colin Wilkinson. Unicorn. ISBN 978-1911604365
- Lack, David. 1957. Evolutionary Theory and Christian Belief: The Unresolved Conflict. Methuen, London. ISBN 978-0415474900
- Lack, David. 1965. Enjoying Ornithology. Methuen, London. OCLC 691693809 (illustrated by Robert Gillmor)
- Lack, David. 1966. Population Studies of Birds. Oxford University Press, Oxford. ISBN 9780198573418 (illustrated by Robert Gillmor)
- Lack, David. 1968. Ecological Adaptations for Breeding in Birds. Methuen, London. ISBN 978-0412112201 (illustrated by Robert Gillmor)
- Lack, David. 1971. Ecological Isolation in Birds. Harvard University Press, Cambridge, Mass. and Blackwell, Oxford. ISBN 978-0674224421 (illustrated by Robert Gillmor)
- Lack, David. 1974. Evolution Illustrated by Waterfowl. Harper & Row, London.ISBN 978-0061361692
- Lack, David. 1976. Island Biology Illustrated by the Land Birds of Jamaica. University of California Press, Berkeley. ISBN 0-520-03007-9 (posthumously).

=== Published journal articles ===
- Lack, D. (1940). "Evolution of the Galapagos Finches". Nature. 146 (3697): 324–327. Bibcode:1940Natur.146..324L. doi:10.1038/146324a0. S2CID 43465549.
- Lack, David (1942). "Ecological features of the bird faunas of British small islands". Journal of Animal Ecology. 11 (1): 9–36. Bibcode:1942JAnEc..11....9L. doi:10.2307/1298. JSTOR 1298.
- Lack, David. 1945. The Galapagos finches (Geospizinae): a study in variation.
- Lack, David (1947). "The Significance of Clutch-size". Ibis. 89 (2): 302–352. doi:10.1111/j.1474-919x.1947.tb04155.x.; 90, 25–45.
- Lack, David 1949. The significance of reproductive isolation. In Jepsen G, Mayr E and Simpson GG (eds) Genetics, palaeontology and evolution. Princeton.
- Lack, David. 1954. The evolution of reproductive rates. In Huxley J, Hardy AC and Ford EB (eds). Evolution as a process. Allen & Unwin, London.
- Lack, David (1967). "Interrelationship in breeding adaptations as shown by marine birds". Proc. XIVth Int. Orn. Congr. Oxford. 1966: 3–42.
- Lack, David (1973). "The numbers of species of hummingbirds in the West Indies". Evolution. 27 (2): 326–337. doi:10.2307/2406972. JSTOR 2406972. PMID 28564781.

== Awards and honours ==
- 1951: elected Fellow of the Royal Society (FRS) in 1951
- 1958: receives Godman-Salvin Medal of the British Ornithologists' Union
- 1962–1966: President, International Ornithological Congress
- 1964–1965: President, British Ecological Society
- 1972: Awarded the Darwin Medal of the Royal Society

The centenary of Lack's birth, 16 July 2010, was marked by a 'David Lack Centenary Symposium', hosted by the Edward Grey Institute. A programme of talks focused on and celebrated the scientific contributions of Lack to ornithology, and the broader fields of ecology and evolution, and assessed the development of these fields in the 21st century.

== Personal life ==
David Lack married Elizabeth Lack (née Silva) who was also an ornithologist. Elizabeth Silva was born in Hertfordshire in 1916 and took an early interest in music. She wished to join the Royal Academy of Music in London but the war led to her serving in the Auxiliary Territorial Service as an ambulance driver in Europe. After the war she applied for work and due to her interest in birds she sent her resume to Richard Fitter who passed it on to David Lack with a note "Here's another for your reject file." Lack however interviewed her and appointed her as a secretary. Noting her interest in birds, he also invited her to serve as a field assistant for studies in the Wytham Woods. She also helped in the study of swifts. One day Elizabeth did not return to her office after her observations of the swifts and David, worried that she might have fallen off a ladder, found her engrossed in observation. They became engaged in 1948 and were married on 9 July 1949. The best man was George Varley. They had four children: Peter Lack (born 1952, a biologist), Andrew Lack (born 1953, also a biologist and academic), Paul Lack (born 1957, a freelance teacher), and Catherine Lack (born 1959, a university chaplain). In Oxford, the Lacks initially lived in a flat in Park Town, Oxford, and later on Boars Hill, just south of Oxford. Lack enjoyed music and was also a fan of field hockey and tennis in which he also participated. Lack died from Non-Hodgkin lymphoma despite radiation treatments.

=== Religious beliefs ===
Lack's parents belonged to the Church of England, and he was an agnostic as an early adult but became a convert to Anglicanism in 1948, possibly influenced by Dan and Mary Neylan, friends at Dartington Hall. He sought to find a compromise between science and religion and wrote, in 1957, Evolutionary theory and Christian belief, on the relationship between Christian faith and evolutionary theory. Lack believed that evolution could not account for morality, truth, beauty, free will, self-awareness and individual responsibility. This book foreshadows, in some ways, the non-overlapping magisteria conception of the relationship between religion and science later popularised by Stephen Jay Gould.

Arthur Cain remarked of him, "David Lack was the only religious man I knew at that period who did not allow his religion to dictate his view of natural selection."

== Biography ==
- Anderson, Ted R. (2013). The Life of David Lack. Oxford University Press. ISBN 978-0-19-992264-2.
