= Wytham Woods =

Protected area in Oxfordshire, England

Coordinates: 51.769°N 1.330°W

- Site of Special Scientific Interest
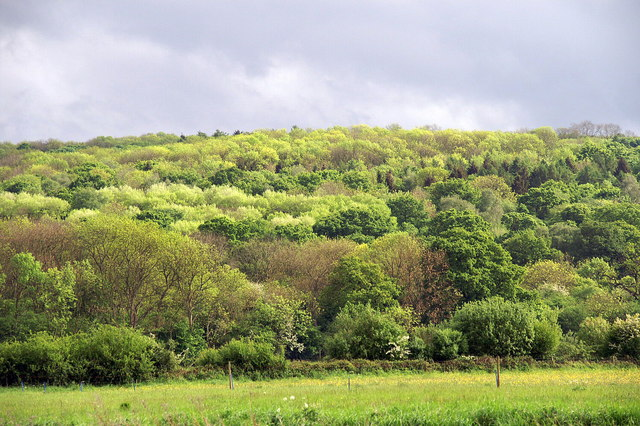
- Location of Wytham Woods.
- Area of search: Oxfordshire
- Grid reference: SP 463 080
- Interest: Biological
- Area: 423.8 hectares (1,047 acres)
- Notification date: 1986
- Location map: Magic Map

Wytham Woods is a 423.8-hectare (1,047-acre) biological Site of Special Scientific Interest north-west of Oxford in Oxfordshire. It is a Nature Conservation Review site.

Habitats in this site, which formerly belonged to Abingdon Abbey, (Note: See Eadwig's Charter to Abingdon Abbey c.957) include ancient woodland and limestone grassland. Over 500 species of vascular plant have been recorded, and probably more data about the bird, mammal, and invertebrate fauna have been recorded about this site than any other in the country as a result of studies by the University of Oxford. More than 900 species of beetles, 580 flies, 200 spiders, 700 bees, wasps and ants, 250 true bugs, and 27 earthworms have been recorded. An important aspect of these data is that they are long-term, with bird data dating back for over 60 years, badger data for over 30 years and climate change data for the last 18 years. Although the majority of the research activity is Oxford-based, any organisation can use the site, with permission.

Current projects include the continuation of long-term study of blue and great tits, bats and climate change, but also newly created projects such as the Darwin Tree of Life project, in conjunction with the Wellcome Sanger Institute.

Access is only allowed with a permit from the owner, the University of Oxford.
