= Rendel (film) =

- English release poster
- Directed by: Jesse Haaja
- Written by: Pekka Lehtosaari; Miika J. Norvanto; Timo Puustinen
- Based on: Jesse Haaja's superhero character
- Produced by: Miika J. Norvanto; Timo Puustinen; Jesse Haaja
- Starring: Kris Gummerus; Matti Onnismaa; Rami Rusinen; Renne Korppila
- Cinematography: Tero Saikkonen
- Music by: Tuomas Kantelinen; Tiko Lasola; Jussi Huhtala
- Production companies: Black Lion Pictures; Frozen Flame Pictures; Bad Beaver Productions
- Distributed by: Raven Banner
- Release dates: September 22, 2017 (Finland); January 30, 2018 (United States)
- Running time: 105 minutes
- Country: Finland
- Languages: Finnish; English
- Budget: €1.45 million

Rendel, also known as Rendel: Dark Vengeance is a 2017 Finnish superhero film written, produced and directed by Jesse Haaja. The film is based on Haaja's self-created character, Rendel. Lead roles are played by Kris Gummerus, Matti Onnismaa, Rami Rusinen and Renne Korppila. The rest of the cast includes Alina Tomnikov, Tero Salenius, Aake Kalliala, Anu Palevaara and Kristina Karjalainen. The film won the Best Action Movie award at the Feratum Film Festival in Mexico.

The sequel, Rendel 2: Cycle of Revenge, was shot in Kainuu in 2019. Raven Banner Entertainment announced Rendel: Cycle of Revenge on their sale slate on EFM 2024.

== Plot ==
In the city of Mikkeli, Finland, a company called VALA has developed a successful vaccine without proper testing. However, the organization is a front for a criminal organization, led by Pekka Erola, whose son Jarno aka "Rotikka", is one of the biggest thugs in the group. However, a mysterious figure decked out in black has been wreaking havoc against VALA and their men. When the mysterious man brutalizes six men, Rotikka notices each man is hung with the name "Rendel" etched in their bodies. Through flashbacks, we learn about Rämö, a financial director of a company who is a family man with his wife and daughter. They give him a biker jacket for a Father's Day gift. However, when he doesn't accept to invest to a Vala worker named Kurikka, the latter calls his boss and tells him what happened. Then, Kurikka's boss calls Rämö's boss and forces him to fire Rämö. Rämö then has trouble finding a job and struggles financially.

Rämö, through the advice of the man who got him fired, Kurikka, gets a job at VALA filing paperwork but Rämö finds himself looking through it one day. He learns the vaccine, made up of a tar that sticks to skin permanent if bonded, has not been properly tested and has in fact, resulted in numerous deaths. Rämö finds himself at crossroads. However, Erola fears Rämö may be a whistleblower. He sends Rotikka and Lahtaaja to kill Rämö and his family. While Rämö's wife and daughter are killed, Rämö is hit with a baseball bat with barbed wire attached and left to die. However, he survives and keeping a canister of the tar in his cellar, Rämö covers his face with the tar and creates a mask. Using the biker jacket given to him by his family and gloves, Rämö becomes the dark avenger Rendel, named after the Hungarian word for "order". A mysterious woman named Marla arrives to help Rendel when needed.

Erola, learning of Rendel's fight against the organization, finds himself answering to higher ups within the organization. The higher ups decide to hire a band of foreign mercenaries to deal with Rendel. The group consists of Mike, Radek, Stacy, Julia, and Jimmy and at first, they are able to overpower Rendel, despite Julia finding herself dead. The others plot to seek revenge. However, Rendel eventually gets himself back in action and eventually wages an all-out war. Meanwhile, a local reporter, Niina Heikkinen, plans to expose VALA for who they are really are. Rotikka kidnaps Niina when he discovers her taking photos of their real crimes. However, Rendel arrives to save her and eventually finds himself defeating all of the mercenaries in various ways. However, when Rendel fights Lahtaaja, Marla attempts to help but she is stabbed from behind and it is revealed that Marla was part of Rendel's imagination as Rendel was the one who was stabbed. Rendel gets a quick second wind and eye for an eye, he fatally wounds Lahtaaja with the baseball bat with barbed wire.

Erola, realizing that Rendel is too much, answers again to the higher ups. Having failed his mission, Erola knows he has to be killed for his actions. Rotikka, who had never earned his father's love or trust, is sent in to shoot his father and kills him. As Rotikka leaves the building after killing his father, Rendel waits in the rain and goes face to face with Rotikka. Rendel closes Rotikka's car trunk on his hands before taking syringes of the vaccine and injecting Rotikka in the neck, killing him. A winded Rendel sees Niina and walks away. As Rendel looks in the heart of Mikkeli, the higher ups vow to get revenge on Rendel.

== Cast ==
- Kris Gummerus as Rämö / Rendel
- Matti Onnismaa as Mr. Erola
- Rami Rusinen as Rotikka
- Renne Korppila as Lahtaaja
- Alina Tomnikov as Marla
- Tero Salenius as Kurikka
- Aake Kalliala as Marsalkka
- Reino Nordin as Reikki
- Sami Huhtala as Taneli
- Marko ”Beltzer” Pesonen as Oskari
- Minna Nevanoja as Niina
- Anu Palevaara as Huora
- Michael Hall as Mike
- Johnny Vivash as Radek
- Bianca Bradey as Stacy
- Michael Majalahti as Jimmy
- Sheila Shah as Julia

== Production ==
Produced with a budget of EUR 1.45 million, Rendel was shot for 50 days in autumn 2015 and spring 2016. The film was shot in Kajaani, Mikkeli, Varkaus, Helsinki, Sotkamo, Kuopio and Puolanka, but the actual story itself takes place mainly in Mikkeli. Director Jesse Haaja received nearly 500 sponsors for the film, who were offered visibility in the film, online, and in taping the cars of the film crew. Investments varied between EUR 50 and EUR 70,000, and the financiers include the towns of Mikkeli and Varkaus.

=== Writing ===
Jesse Haaja, Pekka Lehtosaari, Timo Puustinen and Miika J. Norvanto are the writers of the movie

=== Music ===
The song "Wonderman" heard in the film is performed by The Rasmus.

== Release ==
Theatrical release in Finland on 22 September 2017.

=== Home media ===
Rendel was released on DVD and Blu-ray by Shout Factory on January 30, 2018.

== Sequel ==
On May 27, 2018, at the Cannes Film Festival, Raven Banner Entertainment announced a sequel to Rendel called Rendel: Cycle of Revenge. Haaja, along with Black Lion Pictures and Canada-based Raven Banner Entertainment, would be working on the sequel.

On August 16, 2019, Production company Frozen Flame Pictures Ltd announced shooting would begin in September. Due to its international following, it was announced the film would be shot entirely in English and the cast would include original stars Kris Gummerus as Rendel, Tero Selinius as Kurrikka, and Minna Nevanoja as Niina Heikkinen along with Sean Cronin as the film's central villain Smiley; Kaitlin Boye as Fugu, Bruce Payne as Edward Cox, and Jonah Paull. Jessica Wolff is replacing Alina Tomnikov as Marla in the sequel.
