= Brit Pack (disambiguation) =

Brit Pack may refer to:

- Brit Pack (actors) actors of the 1980s, including Gary Oldman and Tim Roth
- Young British Artists of the 1990s including Sarah Lucas and Damien Hirst, also referred to as the "Brit Pack"
