= Mauro Biglino =

Italian author, essayist and translator

- Born: Mauro Biglino; 13 September 1950 (age 75); Turin, Italy
- Occupations: author, essayist, translator
- Website: maurobiglino.it (in Italian)

Mauro Biglino (born 13 September 1950) is an Italian author, essayist, and translator. Much of his work focuses on the translation of original Hebrew texts and the intended linguistic meaning vs. the many revisions of the Bible and church history, including conspiracy theories, ufology, and the speculation of ancient astronauts. As he himself declared, his ideas are mostly based on the literary works of fringe theorists Erich von Däniken and Zecharia Sitchin. Biglino has also been involved in producing Italian interlinear editions of the Twelve Minor Prophets for Edizioni Paoline in Rome, Italy.

He wrote the volume Chiesa Cattolica e Massoneria ("Catholic Church and Freemasonry"), where he declared to have been a Freemason and member of the Italian Freemasonry for more than ten years until the 2000s.

== Filmography ==
- Creators: The Past as himself (2019)
