= Rendel 2: Cycle of Revenge =

Rendel: Cycle of Revenge
- Poster
- Directed by: Jesse Haaja
- Written by: Pekka Lehtosaari
- Produced by: Miika J. Norvanto, Timo Puustinen
- Starring: Kris Gummerus; Sean Cronin; Bruce Payne
- Cinematography: Tero Saikkonen
- Edited by: Miika J. Norvanto, Pekka Lehtosaari, Timo Puustinen, Mikko Löppönen
- Music by: Jussi Huhtala
- Production company: Frozen Flame Pictures
- Distributed by: Black Lion Pictures Oy
- Release date: 21 June 2024 (Germany)
- Running time: 99 minutes
- Country: Finland
- Language: English
- Budget: 2 500 000 €

Rendel: Cycle of Revenge is a 2024 Finnish superhero film directed by Jesse Haaja. The film is a sequel to Rendel. The film stars Kris Gummerus, as the title character, Sean Cronin and Bruce Payne.

The premiere of the film was tentatively scheduled for early 2021. Due to unexpected problems, the film's script could not be filmed in its entirety, and soon after filming, the project was interrupted in an extraordinary way and the director was removed from the production. Due to the disappointments related to making the sequel, Haaja ended his career as a filmmaker. The film was first released digitally in Germany on 21 June 2024.

== Premise ==
After losing his family, the masked vigilante RENDEL is caught in a cycle of revenge, destroying the VALA organization piece by piece. VALA's ruthless leader Christopher "Smiley" Cox is about to release a harmful NH25 vaccine worldwide, which Rendel is trying to stop. A spiral of violence awakens the ghosts of the past and raises the stakes in the battle against a mythical enemy. Can a vigilante be a hero? RENDEL - a Dark Hero of Vengeance.

== Cast ==
- Kristofer Gummerus as Rendel/Ramo
- Sean Cronin as Smiley/Christopher Cox
- Bruce Payne as Edward Cox
- Minna Nevanoja as Nina
- Tero Salenius as Kurikka
- Kaitlyn Boyé as Fugu
- Mikko Nousiainen as Husky
- Juha-Matti Halonen as Skinny
- Jonah Paull as Kid
- Jari Manninen as Gert
- Jarmo Mäkinen as Horst

== Production ==
On May 27, 2018, at the Cannes Film Festival, Raven Banner Entertainment announced a sequel to Rendel called Rendel: Cycle of Revenge. Haaja, along with Black Lion and Canada-based Raven Banner Entertainment, would be working on the sequel.

On August 16, 2019, Production company Frozen Flame Pictures Ltd announced shooting would begin in September. Due to its international following, it was announced the film would be shot entirely in English and the cast would include original stars Kris Gummerus as Rendel, Tero Salenius as Kurikka, and Minna Nevanoja as Niina Heikkinen along with Sean Cronin as the film's central villain Smiley; Kaitlyn Boyé as Fugu, Bruce Payne as Edward Cox, and Jonah Paull. Jessica Wolff is replacing Alina Tomnikov as Marla in the sequel.

The main shooting of the film was completed in Kainuu in six weeks. The film was shot both in Kajaani and in Jyväskylä.

Director Jesse Haaja was removed from the production on 2020. Post-production and completion of the film was made by the producers Miika J. Norvanto and Timo Puustinen with the help of the screenwriter Pekka Lehtosaari.

After completion of the film Raven Banner Entertainment announced Rendel: Cycle of Revenge to be on their sale slate on EFM 2024.
