= Ruta Gedmintas =

British actress

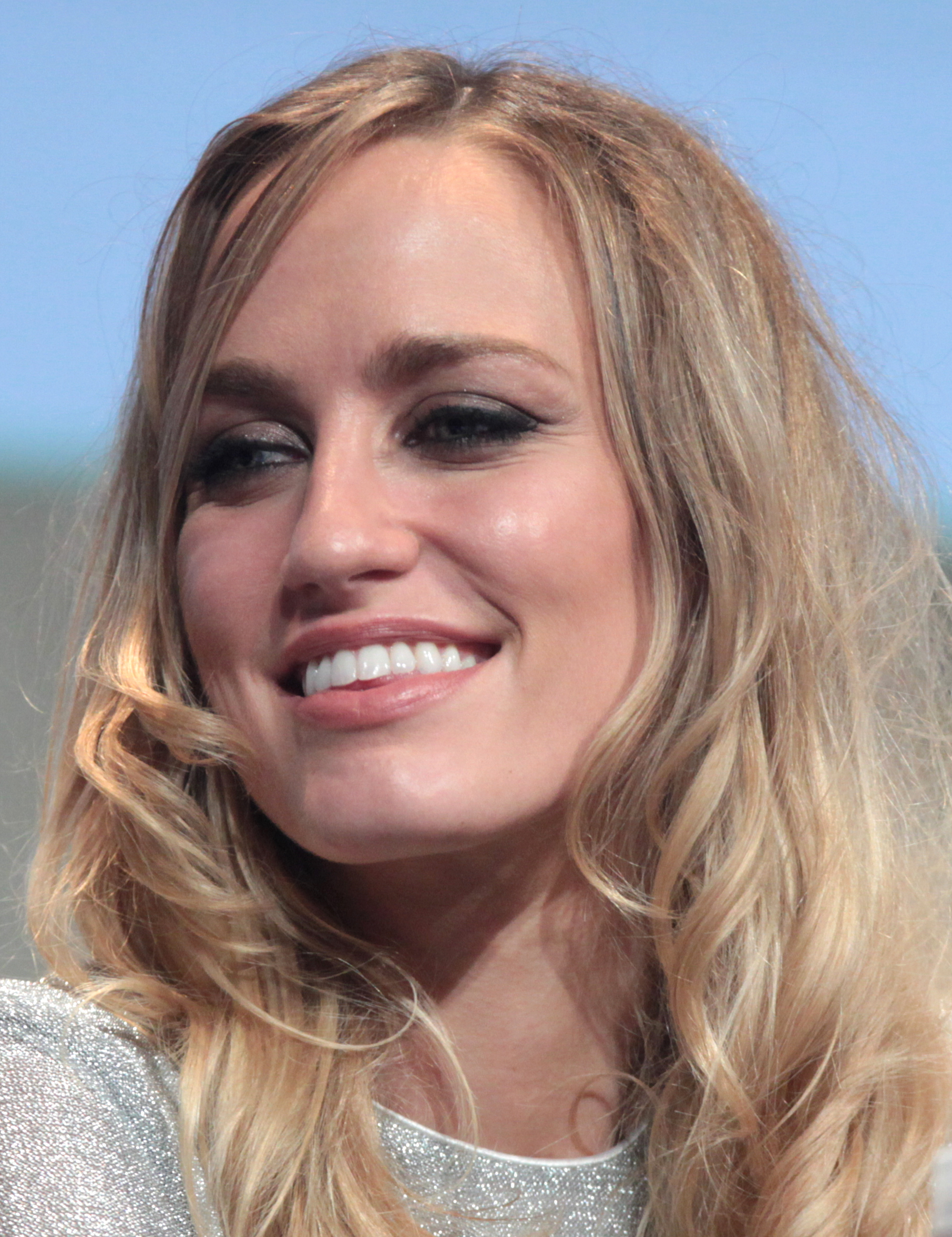
- Gedmintas in July 2015
- Born: Canterbury, Kent, England
- Occupation: Actress
- Years active: 2005–present

Ruta Gedmintas is a British actress known for her work on television. Her credits include The Innocence Project (2006–2007), The Tudors (2007), Spooks: Code 9 (2008), The Borgias (2011), Lip Service (2010–2012), The Strain (2014–2017), and His Dark Materials (2019–2022).

== Early life ==
Gedmintas was born in Canterbury, Kent, the daughter of a Lithuanian father and an English mother. She grew up in Buckinghamshire and trained at the Drama Centre London under Reuven Adiv.

== Career ==
Gedmintas appeared in Spooks: Code 9 as Rachel Harris, a former police officer. She has also had guest roles in the BBC's Waking the Dead and ITV1's The Bill. She also appeared as Elizabeth Blount in Showtime's The Tudors. In 2010 she worked on the independent films Zerosome and Atletu (aka The Athlete); and then starred as Frankie in BBC Three's Lip Service.

Gedmintas appeared in the American drama Do No Harm as Olivia Flynn. The series aired for one season from January through September 2013 before being cancelled. She starred in an episode of the critically acclaimed show Ripper Street. She also starred in The Strain as Dutch, a computer hacker and resistance fighter. In 2019 she was cast as Serafina Pekkala in His Dark Materials.

Gedmintas starred in the play Unfaithful at London's Found111, alongside Sean Campion, Niamh Cusack, and Matthew Lewis. She played Astrid in Backbeat, a play about The Beatles.

She played Sophie in the black comedy Stag. She was Betty, an animal-loving neighbour in A Street Cat Named Bob, released in November 2016.

== Filmography ==
Film
| Year | Title | Role | Notes |
|---|---|---|---|
| 2008 | The Lost Samaritan | Elle Hass | |
| 2008 | Miss Conception | Alexandra | |
| 2008 | Atletu | Charlotte | |
| 2009 | Prowl | Suzy | |
| 2010 | Zerosome | Lara | |
| 2011 | Exteriors | Pearl | |
| 2011 | You Instead | Lake | |
| 2015 | The Incident | Annabel | Directed by Jane Linfoot |
| 2016 | A Street Cat Named Bob | Betty | |
| 2025 | The Gorge | WWII Scientist | |

Television
| Year | Title | Role | Notes |
|---|---|---|---|
| 2005 | Waking the Dead | Shelly Martin | Episode: "Undertow: Part I" |
| 2006 | Goldplated | Miranda | 1 Episode |
| 2006–2007 | The Innocence Project | Mary Jarvis | 6 episodes |
| 2007 | The Tudors | Elizabeth Blount | 3 episodes |
| 2007 | The Bill | Gemma Hayes | Episode: "Stealth Attack" |
| 2008 | Spooks: Code 9 | Rachel | 6 episodes |
| 2009 | Personal Affairs | Evie | 2 episodes |
| 2010–2012 | Lip Service | Francesca "Frankie" Alan | 9 episodes |
| 2011 | The Borgias | Ursula Banadeo/Sister Martha | 6 Episodes |
| 2013 | Do No Harm | Olivia Chase | Main cast; 12 Episodes |
| 2013 | Ripper Street | Clara Silver | Season 1, Episode 8 |
| 2013 | The Guilty | Teresa Morgan | 3 episodes of a 3-part miniseries |
| 2014–2017 | The Strain | Kirsten "Dutch" Velders | Recurring (Season 1); Main cast (Season 2–4) |
| 2016 | Stag | Sophie | 1 episode of a 3-part miniseries |
| 2019–2022 | His Dark Materials | Serafina Pekkala | Main role |
| 2025 | The Sandman | Queen Titania | Supporting Cast |
| 2026 | Crookhaven | | |

Stage
| Year | Title | Role | Notes |
|---|---|---|---|
| 2015 | Backbeat: The Musical | Astrid Kirchherr | at the Duke of York's Theatre, London |
