= Brian Bosworth =

American actor and football player (born 1965)

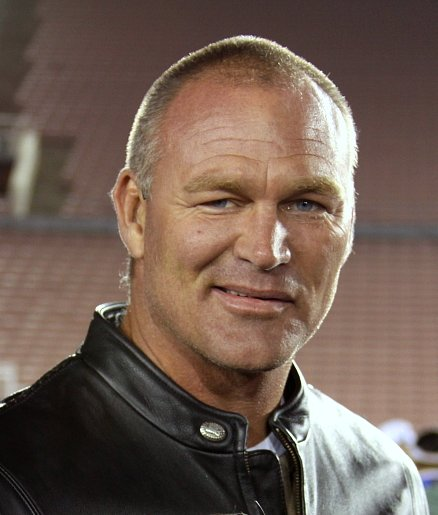
- Bosworth in 2009

No. 55
- Position: Linebacker

Personal information
- Born: March 9, 1965 (age 61); Oklahoma City, Oklahoma, U.S.
- Listed height: 6 ft 2 in (1.88 m)
- Listed weight: 248 lb (112 kg)

Career information
- High school: MacArthur (Irving, Texas)
- College: Oklahoma (1983–1986)
- Supplemental draft: 1987: 1st round

Career history
- Seattle Seahawks (1987–1989)

Awards and highlights
- PFWA All-Rookie Team (1987); National champion (1985); 2× Butkus Award (1985, 1986); 2× Unanimous All-American (1985, 1986); Second-team All-American (1984); 2× Big Eight Defensive Player of the Year (1985, 1986); 3× First-team All-Big Eight (1984–1986); Second-team AP All-Time All-American (2025)

Career NFL statistics
- Tackles: 175
- Sacks: 4.0
- Fumble recoveries: 3
- Stats at Pro Football Reference
- College Football Hall of Fame

Brian Keith Bosworth (born March 9, 1965) is an American actor and former professional football linebacker who played in the National Football League (NFL) for three seasons with the Seattle Seahawks. Nicknamed "the Boz", he played college football for the Oklahoma Sooners, earning two Dick Butkus Awards and winning the 1986 Orange Bowl. Bosworth was selected by the Seahawks in the first round of the 1987 NFL supplemental draft, but his professional career was cut short by injury. After retiring as a player, Bosworth pursued an acting career. He was inducted into the College Football Hall of Fame in 2015.

== Early life ==
Brian Bosworth was born in Oklahoma City, Oklahoma. He attended MacArthur High School in Irving, Texas, where he was a two-time consensus All-American for the football team. He graduated in 1983. He was recruited to play football for the University of Oklahoma.

== College career ==
Redshirted as a true freshman in 1983, Bosworth played linebacker for the Oklahoma Sooners for three seasons (1984–1986). He was recognized as a unanimous All-American in both his sophomore and junior years.

Bosworth was barred from playing in the Orange Bowl following his junior year after he tested positive for steroids. He claimed that his use of steroids was medically prescribed by his doctor because of injuries.

A strong-side inside linebacker throughout his college career, Bosworth was known for raising his level of play in big games. He was regarded as a great tackler, although he was occasionally criticized for tackling too high. The winner of the first two Butkus Awards as the nation's top college linebacker, he remains the only player ever to have won the accolade more than once. College Football News ranked him No. 30 on its list of the "100 Greatest College Players of All-Time". In October 1999, Bosworth was named to the Sports Illustrated NCAA Football All-Century Team as one of only nine linebackers on the squad.

== College controversies ==
Bosworth is known for his radical hairstyles, his on-field play, and his criticism of the NCAA. He was particularly focused on the level of control the NCAA exerted over athletes, preventing them from making money during their college careers.

Because of his suspension due to steroid use, Bosworth was not allowed to play in the post-season 1987 Orange Bowl. During the 3rd quarter of that game, Bosworth pulled off his football jersey to reveal a T-shirt that read, "NCAA: National Communists Against Athletes." Picked up by the television cameras, this led to much consternation among alumni and administrators at the university. Aware that Bosworth was likely to be entering the NFL draft anyway, the OU coach, Barry Switzer, dismissed Bosworth from the team.

Bosworth was quoted in Sports Illustrated magazine's 1986 fall football issue as saying that at a summer job at General Motors' Oklahoma City plant, co-workers taught him how to insert bolts in hard-to-reach places to ensure they would rattle. He told the magazine, "If you own a Celebrity or Century made in 1985 in Oklahoma City, that car is (messed up) if I had anything to do with it". In addition, he claimed that each bolt carried a note that said: "Aha! You found me!" and said, "I love the thought of people going absolutely crazy, saying "Where is that ... rattle coming from?"' Some of Bosworth's former co-workers who read about it disputed the story. Bosworth reportedly retracted the statement, although he later denied the retraction.

In September 1988, Bosworth wrote an autobiography, The Boz, with Sports Illustrated's Rick Reilly. In it, Bosworth said the Sooner football program was laden with drug use, gunplay in the athletic dorm, and other wild behavior. Although many Sooner boosters dismissed it as the rantings of a resentful ex-player, an NCAA report issued three months later confirmed many of Bosworth's claims, and ultimately led to Switzer being forced to resign.

=== NFL draft ===
Bosworth planned his college coursework so that he could graduate a year early, which would allow him the option to enter the NFL draft a year early. In addition, it would give him some leverage over which team drafted him. Knowing he could go back to Oklahoma if he did not get chosen by a preferred NFL team, Bosworth sent letters to various NFL teams stating that, if they drafted him, he wouldn't report to their training camp and he wouldn't play for them. As a joke, the Tacoma Stars of the Major Indoor Soccer League selected him in the 12th round in their 1987 draft, as their general manager stated, "Because we didn't receive a letter from him that he wouldn't play for us." At one point, Bosworth was interviewed by Bryant Gumbel on The Today Show and declared his desire to play for the Los Angeles Raiders saying they best fit his personality.

By getting dismissed from the football team after the Orange Bowl T-shirt incident, Bosworth lost his leverage in trying to control where he would play.

== Professional career ==
Bosworth did not declare his eligibility in time for the 1987 NFL draft, held in late April. Six weeks later in mid-June, he was selected by the Seattle Seahawks with the first pick of the supplemental draft. Seattle was one of the teams to whom he had sent a letter of disinterest. After initially declaring he would stick to his promise that he would not sign, he signed both the biggest contract in team history and the biggest rookie contract in NFL history at the time: ten years for $11 million. After being drafted, Bosworth sued the NFL for the right to wear number 44 (the number he wore in college) and the Seahawks petitioned for a rules change, due to an NFL rule against linebackers wearing jerseys in the 40s, but were unsuccessful. Bosworth ultimately chose to wear number 55. In 2015, long after Bosworth retired, the NFL changed its rules to allow linebackers to wear jerseys in the 40s.

Bosworth signed with a Seahawks team that had failed to reach the playoffs the previous two seasons. He appeared and started in 12 games as a rookie in 1987, playing well for the most part alongside fellow inside linebacker Fredd Young, but became known more for his outspoken personality and appearance than his actual play on the field. Before the season opener at Denver, Bosworth trash talked Denver quarterback John Elway. At the game, 10,000 Denver fans wore $15 T-shirts reading "What's a Boz Worth? Nothing", but they did not know that Bosworth's company manufactured the shirts. Later that season, prior to the Seahawks' second matchup with the Los Angeles Raiders in late November on Monday Night Football, Bosworth publicly claimed that he was going to "contain" Raiders running back Bo Jackson. During a red zone play, Jackson received a hand-off and powered through Bosworth's attempted tackle to score a touchdown. According to Jackson, when he and Bosworth got to their feet after the play was over, he told Bosworth, "Next time, have bus fare," infuriating Bosworth. The Raiders went on to win that game, 37–14, thanks in part to Jackson's three touchdowns and 221 rushing yards. In Week 15 at Chicago, Bosworth had 4.5 tackles including a sack, a forced fumble and two fumble recoveries in leading the Seahawks to a 34–21 victory, and was named AFC Defensive Player of the Week. The win helped Seattle clinch a spot in the AFC Wild Card Game. In what turned out to be the only playoff game of his NFL career, Bosworth had 17 tackles despite suffering an injury to his left shoulder in the Seahawks' 23–20 overtime loss to the Houston Oilers. Bosworth was named to the PFWA All-Rookie Team following the season.

=== Injury ===
Halfway through the 1988 season, Bosworth was leading the team with 66 tackles before suffering a left shoulder injury in a 31–10 road loss to the Los Angeles Rams in Week 8 and had arthroscopic surgery the following day. Local media reported that Bosworth was suffering from osteoarthritis, a condition that could negatively impact his career, though the Seahawks public relations department denied the claims. He started in only two more games that season as Seattle went on to earn its first AFC West Division title and he did not return for the playoffs. In 1989, Bosworth started the first two games before injuring his right shoulder in a 34–24 loss to the Phoenix Cardinals in Week 2, necessitating another surgery. Bosworth never played football again, and was waived by the Seahawks in July 1990 after failing a team physical examination prior to training camp. Team doctor Pierce E. Scranton Jr. explained, "Brian was a twenty-five-year-old with the shoulders of a sixty-year-old. He flunked my physical." In 1993, Bosworth prevailed in a $7 million lawsuit against Lloyd's of London. Lloyd's position was Bosworth's shoulder was injured as a result of degenerative arthritis that was not covered in his policy, while Bosworth maintained his injury was sustained during a single hit.

== Legacy ==
On January 9, 2015, Bosworth was announced as one of the inductees to the College Football Hall of Fame class of 2015.

In 2004, Bosworth was picked by voters as the third-worst flop (and by an expert panel as the sixth-worst) on the Biggest Flops of the Last 25 Years list by ESPN.

== Commentator and acting career ==
Following the end of his football career, Bosworth decided to pursue a career as an actor. He starred in the 1991 action film Stone Cold and has had an on-again/off-again film career starring in several low budget titles such as One Man's Justice that went straight to DVD. In 2005, he had a role as one of the prison-guard football players in the Adam Sandler movie remake The Longest Yard. He also starred in Lawless, a television series for Fox that was cancelled immediately after its premiere.

In 2001, Bosworth joined the XFL as a color commentator for its television broadcasts. He was assigned to the crew which called games that aired Sunday nights on UPN, which consisted of Chris Marlowe on play-by-play and Chris Wragge and Michael Barkann as the sideline reporters.

Two years later, Bosworth was hired by Turner Sports as a college football studio analyst. Bosworth worked on TBS' Saturday night game coverage, contributing to pregame, halftime, and postgame coverage alongside studio host Ernie Johnson. He left the position after the 2003 season.

Bosworth has been a guest on numerous episodes of Chopped as a judge.

He appeared on episode 1, in the 2010 season of Hell's Kitchen as a dining guest.

In August 2014, Bosworth appeared in a Dish Network commercial with fellow former players Matt Leinart and Heath Shuler, depicting them pining for a chance to return to their more successful college days.

Bosworth appeared with Bo Jackson in a Tecmo Bowl-style television advertisement for the Kia Sorento in 2016, which parodied Jackson running through him in their 1987 game.

Bosworth has appeared as the sheriff in the "Fansville" series of Dr Pepper commercials since 2018.

== Personal life ==
Bosworth married his high school girlfriend, Katherine Nicastro, in September 1993. The couple had three children before divorcing in 2006. He also has two twin nephews, Kyle and Korey, who played football for the UCLA Bruins. They both were signed as undrafted free agents, Kyle by the Jacksonville Jaguars (where he played three seasons) and Korey by the Detroit Lions. In 2010, Bosworth became a real estate agent for Sotheby's International Realty in their Malibu, California brokerage office.

On July 5, 2008, Bosworth assisted with the rescue of a woman who rolled her SUV east of Winnipeg, Manitoba. In 2009, he administered CPR to a fallen man in a parking lot until medical help arrived.

== Brian and the Boz ==
In 2014, Brian and The Boz premiered as part of ESPN's 30 for 30 series, chronicling Brian Bosworth's athletic journey. The film explores Bosworth's struggle with the persona he created, known as The Boz; which began to dominate his life. Participants include Barry Switzer, Bosworth's former coach, teammates like Tony Casillas, critical of Bosworth's autobiography, and Rick Reilly, co-writer of "The Boz." Close friends and family, such as childhood friend John DiPasquale, Bosworth's daughter Hayley, and Sooners fan Jim Ross, also contribute.

== Acting filmography ==
Year	Title	Role	Director
1991	Stone Cold	Officer Joe Huff / John Stone	Craig R. Baxley
1995	One Man's Justice	John North	Kurt Wimmer
1996	Virus	Ken Fairchild	Allan A. Goldstein (also released under the title Spill)
1997	Midnight Heat	FBI Agent John Gray / Wayne Garret	Allan A. Goldstein
1998	Back in Business	Joe Elkhart	Philippe Mora
1999	Three Kings	Action Star	David O. Russell
2000	The Operative	Alec / Grady	Robert Lee
2001	Phase IV	Detective Steven Birnam	Bryan Goeres
2001	Mach 2	Captain Jack Tyree	Fred Olen Ray
2005	The Longest Yard	Guard Garner	Peter Segal
2005	CSI: Miami - Episode - "Shattered"	Duane "Bull" Merrick	Scott Lautanen
2009	Rock Slyde	The Friendly Pirate	Chris Dowling
2010	Blue Mountain State (Season 2 Ep. 3)	Himself	Eric Falconer, Chris Romano
2010	Down and Distance	John Vonarb	Brian J. De Palma
2013	Revelation Road: The Beginning of the End	Hawg	Gabriel Sabloff
2013	Revelation Road 2: The Sea of Glass and Fire	Hawg	Gabriel Sabloff
2014	The Black Rider: Revelation Road	Hawg	Gabriel Sabloff
2015	Do You Believe?	Joe	Jonatham M. Gunn
2019	What Men Want	Nick Ivers	Adam Shankman
2019	Ambitions	Hunter Purifoy	
2019	The Reliant	Jack	Paul Munger
2025	Signing Tony Raymond	Coach Buck Tubbs	
