= Give Them Wings =

Film directed by Sean Cronin

- Directed by: Sean Cronin
- Written by: Paul Hodgson; Tony Waddington
- Produced by: Sean Cronin; Paul Hodgson; Ian Carter
- Starring: Daniel Watson; Toyah Willcox; Bill Fellows; Jacob Anderton; Katie Sheridan; Rachel Warren; Jonathan Hansler; Debra Stephenson; Tracey Wilkinson; Bruce Payne; Dominic Weatherill
- Cinematography: Tero Saikkonen
- Edited by: Sean Cronin
- Music by: Guy Dagul
- Production companies: Magnificent Films; GTW Productions; Shaking the Tree Productions; Shooting Tiger Pictures
- Release dates: 20 November 2021 (North East International Film Festival); 1 August 2022
- Country: United Kingdom
- Language: English

Give Them Wings is a 2021 British drama film directed by Sean Cronin and starring Daniel Watson, Toyah Willcox, Bill Fellows, Jacob Anderton, Katie Sheridan, Rachel Warren, Jonathan Hansler, Debra Stephenson, Tracey Wilkinson, Dominic Weatherill, Kris Deedigan and Bruce Payne.

== Plot ==
The film tells the story of Paul Hodgson, who was left unable to speak or move after a bout of meningitis as a child. The film explores how Paul 'made the best out of a bad situation'.

== Cast ==
- Daniel Watson as Paul Hodgson
- Toyah Willcox as Alice Hodgson
- Bill Fellows as Norman Hodgson
- Jacob Anderton as Ian Carter
- Katie Sheridan as Jane
- Rachel Warren as Karen
- Jonathan Hansler as Ernest Hogg
- Debra Stephenson as Ethel Hogg
- Bruce Payne as Dr Markum
- Tracey Wilkinson as Marion Carter
- Dominic Weatherill as Richard
- Kris Deedigan as Brian Little

== Production ==
In order to raise funding for the film, the director, Sean Cronin, organised a football match in which former footballers competed against a team of celebrities.

== Reception ==
=== Box office ===
The film was a box office failure, earning just $607.00 worldwide.

=== Critical reception ===
John Higgins gave the film four out of five stars and stated that it focuses 'on the deeper feelings and issues of an under-represented demographic and, as a result, reveals a real insight and truth within a film that works well'. Higgins also stated that 'Watson is brilliant in the lead role' and that Willcox delivers a 'revelation of a performance'. Phil Hoad, who reviewed the film for The Guardian, gave the film a score of three stars out of five and described it as a 'disarmingly sincere autobiopic'. Hoad also stated that director Cronin got 'supple, generous performances from his cast across the board' and that the film contained 'some of the innocence and goodwill of vintage British studio-era films'. Richard Maguire awarded the film a score of three stars out of five. Maguire stated that 'Sean Cronin’s film is ultimately a feel-good movie about a man overcoming his challenges, but along the way the journey is surprisingly dark'. Maguire described Daniel Watson's portrayal of Paul as 'lively, funny and engaging'. Maguire also stated that Toyah Willcox surprises as Paul's mother and that her 'hardworking and phlegmatic character' was a million miles from her first roles like Monkey in Quadrophenia or Mad in Derek Jarman’s Jubilee '. The BBC's Neil Green described the film as 'very special'. Louie Fecou stated that the film followed in the footsteps of My Left Foot and Billy Elliot and 'was often a very bleak piece of work'. Nonetheless, Fecou stated that viewers who remembered 'the golden age of British film slice-of-life presentations' would 'find a lot to enjoy here'. Graham Fuller gave the film a rating of three out of five stars and stated that it 'is a crowd-pleasing underdog with guts, grit and an admirable streak of unsentimental humour'. Fuller was critical of 'Paul’s friendship with a neighbour who fancies himself an inventor (Jonathan Hansler and Debra Stephenson are irresistible as this hearty bloke and his narrow-minded wife)' being 'the source of a preposterous deus ex machina that leads to rapprochements'. Nonetheless, Fuller conceded that although 'this requires one character to perform a volte-face that should have been foreshadowed much earlier, it’s intolerable to imagine Give Them Wings ending any other way than it does – on a high'.
