= Do No Harm (TV series) =

American medical drama television series

- Genre: Medical drama
- Created by: David Schulner
- Starring: Steven Pasquale; Alana de la Garza; Ruta Gedmintas; Phylicia Rashad; Michael Esper; John Carroll Lynch; Lin-Manuel Miranda; Samm Levine
- Composer: James S. Levine
- Country of origin: United States
- Original language: English
- No. of seasons: 1
- No. of episodes: 13

Production
- Executive producers: David Schulner; Michael Mayer; Peter Traugott; Rachel Kaplan
- Production location: Philadelphia
- Running time: 43 minutes
- Production companies: Mount Moriah; The Best Day Entertainment; Universal Television; Open 4 Business Productions

Original release
- Network: NBC
- Release: January 31 – September 7, 2013

Do No Harm is an American medical drama television series that aired on NBC from January 31 through September 7, 2013. The series follows Dr. Jason Cole as he balances working as a neurosurgeon with suppressing his evil alter ego, Ian Price.

Do No Harm is a modern take on Robert Louis Stevenson's classic 1886 novella Strange Case of Dr Jekyll and Mr Hyde. The series was panned by critics, and holds a 15% on Rotten Tomatoes.

The network placed a series order in May 2012. On November 12, 2012, NBC reduced its episode order for the series from 13 to 12 episodes, due to scheduling conflicts (13 episodes were produced and eventually aired).

On February 8, 2013, it was announced that NBC had cancelled the series after airing two episodes, due to low ratings. On April 26, 2013, NBC announced that the remaining episodes would be burned off, beginning June 29, 2013.

== Cast and characters ==
=== Main cast ===
- Steven Pasquale as Dr. Jason Cole (chief of neurosurgery at Independence Memorial Hospital) and as Ian Price, his alternate personality
- Alana de la Garza as Dr. Lena Solis, a neurologist at IMH and Dr. Cole's love interest
- Ruta Gedmintas as Olivia Flynn, Dr. Cole's estranged former fiancé and the mother of his son, Cole
- Phylicia Rashad as Dr. Vanessa Young, chief of surgery at IMH
- Michael Esper as Dr. Kenneth Jordan, a neurosurgeon at IMH who is suspicious of Dr. Cole
- John Carroll Lynch as Will Hayes, a construction contractor and the leader of Dr. Cole's dissociative personality disorder support group

=== Recurring cast ===
- Lin-Manuel Miranda as Dr. Ruben Marcado, a clinical pharmacologist at IMH and Dr. Cole's friend
- Samm Levine as Josh Stern, Dr. Cole's administrative assistant
- Jeremy Davidson as Rob, another doctor at IMH and Lena's boyfriend
- Toni Trucks as Dr. Patricia Rivers
- James Cromwell as Dr. Phillip Carmelo
- Jurnee Smollett as Abby, Dr. Young's daughter who has just left drug rehab
- Brendan McHale as Cole Flynn, Jason/Ian and Olivia's son

== Episodes ==
No.	Title	Directed by	Written by	Original release date	US viewers (millions)
1	"Pilot"	Michael Mayer	David Schulner	January 31, 2013	3.12
Dr. Jason Cole, a highly-regarded neurosurgeon, discovers that his long-suppressed alternate personality, Ian Price, has returned with a vengeance, threatening his career and relationships.
2	"Don't Answer the Phone"	Jeffrey Reiner	Lisa Zwerling	February 7, 2013	2.21
After Jason cuts off Ian's cash flow, he wakes to find himself at the wheel of a silver Ferrari he does not remember buying. It turns out the car belongs to a drug dealer whom Ian had sold drugs for, but he had not delivered the money. Dr. Kenneth Jordan becomes increasingly more suspicious of Jason's behaviour.
3	"Morning, Sunshine"	Jeffrey Reiner	David Schulner	June 29, 2013	1.80
Jason sets ground rules for Ian, which he continually refuses to follow. Ian's decisions begin having more and more marked effects on Jason's world. At the hospital, Jason has a new patient, a man Ian had thrown from a balcony at a club. The man now poses the threat of exposing his double life, leaving Jason to decide whether he wants to save the man's life or leave him to die in order to protect his secret.
4	"Me Likey"	John Behring	Eric Charmelo & Nicole Snyder	July 6, 2013	1.60
Jason awakens to discover Ian has uploaded nude pictures of himself to Jason's Facebook page. Later, Jason attempts to outwit Ian with help from a sympathetic tattoo artist.
5	"A Stand-In"	John Behring	Lauren Schmidt Hissrich	July 20, 2013	1.63
Jason tricks Ian into attending a meeting with others from his support group. At the meeting Ian meets a woman who he takes back to his apartment. In the morning Jason awakes to find blood all over the apartment, and the girl Ian had brought home from the meeting lying in the bathtub. This turns out to be a prank. Jason suspects the girl might have a life-threatening condition, but helping her might result in ending her relationship with Ian. He has to decide whether to save her life or keep Ian happy. Jason is suspected of chart tampering and Lena decides she wants to move on with another colleague.
6	"I Can't Keep Your Secret"	Michael Waxman	Diana Son	July 27, 2013	1.56
Jason awakes to a phone call from Will Hayes informing him that Ian had set ablaze the church in which they held their support group meetings. At the hospital Jason gets into an argument with Ruben over the drug which he had been using to keep Ian in check for the last few years. Ruben wants to make his fortune selling the drug, but Jason knows this would expose his secret. A new patient arrives, a young woman who has had an accident while mountain biking with her fiancé. Shortly after her arrival Jason gets the mysterious text, "I can't keep your secret any more", from a blocked number. Dr. Young requests Jason take a drug test, so he asks Ruben for his help, after which Ruben switches the sample. Jason discovers it was Olivia who sent the text, because she was considering telling Ian about Jason's plans to kill him.
7	"Six Feet Deep"	Kate Woods	Tracy Bellomo	August 3, 2013	1.68
Maxim Cozar, the victim of a car crash, dies on Jason's watch as his father watches how Jason attends to both his son and Phil Watts, the other victim. Later that evening, as he is leaving a casino, Ian gets abducted and taken to see Maxim's father, a Russian crime boss, and his life threatened. Jason awakes in an alley, a video from Ian on his phone telling him that he will help this one time, but Jason will owe him. At the hospital the father comes by to remind Jason of their deal, and he learns that Ian has traded his life for the life of Phil Watts. He turns to Ruben for help with a plan to fake Phil's death. After his shift Jason calls Cozar asking for a return favour. Olivia's son begins asking questions, so she tells him about his dad, comparing him to the Hulk. She later tells him they are returning home so that he can see his daddy. Dr. Jordan tries to get more time off to spend time with his blind son, telling Dr. Young that he is considering leaving the hospital. Lena's new patient and her husband are reluctant to allow Jason to operate on their unborn son, since it poses some risk of them losing the baby. Lena asks Dr. Jordan for his help talking to the parents. They agree to allow Dr. Jordan to perform the operation. Complications arise when the mother is on the table, but Dr. Jordan manages to regain control of the situation. Jason takes over the procedure allowing Dr. Jordan to see his son's school piano recital. It turns out the favour was helping getting some of Ian's spinal fluid.
8	"The Cookie Jar"	Jeffrey Reiner	Deirdre Mangan	August 10, 2013	1.57
A problem causes delay in a lengthy surgery forcing Jason to try an untested version of Ruben's kill drug, leading to unforeseen side effects. Lena's plan for a weekend getaway is cut short.
9	"Circadian Rhythms"	Colin Bucksey	Tracey Scott Wilson	August 17, 2013	1.89
Jason continues taking more of Ruben's untested new drug and experiences unpredictable results. He and Ruben are left desperately trying to restore the normal cycle, with Ian now surfacing at random times. Upon discovering their plan to kill him, Ian escapes and begins seeking revenge, risking the life of a patient in surgery and forcing Jason into finding a final solution.
10	"Mine"	Aaron Lipstadt	Aaron Ginsburg & Wade McIntyre	August 24, 2013	2.33
As his life begins to unravel, and now even more desperate to prevent his secret from being exposed, Ian is forced to turn to Jason's most trusted ally, Dr. Marcado.
11	"But I'm Allergic to Cats"	Omar Madha	Zev Borow	August 31, 2013	1.71
With work continuing on optimising the kill drug, Dr. Marcado has to decide who it should be used to eliminate, Ian or Jason?
12	"You Made Me Do This"	Nick Gomez	David Foster	August 31, 2013	1.88
Ian discovers Jason knows that Cole is his son, so he kidnaps Cole. After recovering a repressed memory, Jason learns that Ian was actually his brother.
13	"This Is How It Ends"	John Behring	Story by : Zev Borow & Lauren Schmidt Hissrich; Teleplay by : David Foster & David Schulner	September 7, 2013	1.54
Jason learns the truth about Ian. By choosing to undergo a complex surgical procedure, he attempts to eliminate him once and for all, but Ian is not prepared to give up without a fight.

== Reception ==
The series has received a 38 out of 100 on Metacritic, and 15% on Rotten Tomatoes. It also had the lowest-rated in-season scripted premiere ever on the four major broadcast networks.

The series was criticized for being far-fetched and having poor writing, although Steven Pasquale's performance as Jason Cole/Ian Price was praised.

Mary McNamara of the Los Angeles Times described the series "not so much a thrilling psychological drama as a mismatched roommate comedy. Oscar and Felix, if one of them was a doctor and they had to share the same body."

Entertainment Weekly wrote that "the Jekyll-and-Hyde medical drama...set a record as the lowest-rated in-season drama debut in modern history...and was axed after two episodes," the show being one of many that harmed NBC's winter line-up.

== Streaming ==
All episodes are available from electronic sell-through platforms such as iTunes, Amazon Instant Video and Vudu.
