= Prowl (film) =

2010 US horror film by Patrik Syversen

- Theatrical poster
- Directed by: Patrik Syversen
- Written by: Tim Tori
- Produced by: Zachery Ty Bryan; Stephanie Caleb; Christopher D'Elia; Michael Klein; Christopher Milburn; Lucy Mukerjee; Bobby Ranghelov; Courtney Solomon
- Starring: Courtney Hope; Bruce Payne; Ruta Gedmintas
- Cinematography: Håvard Andre Byrkjeland
- Edited by: Celia Haining
- Music by: Theo Green
- Production companies: Dobré Films; After Dark Films; Midsummer Films; Vision Entertainment Group
- Distributed by: After Dark Films
- Release dates: September 4, 2010 (L'Étrange Festival); January 28, 2011
- Running time: 81 minutes
- Country: United States
- Language: English

Prowl is a 2010 American horror film directed by Patrik Syversen and written by Tim Tori and starring Courtney Hope, Ruta Gedmintas and Bruce Payne.

== Synopsis ==
Amber is a young woman who works at a butchery and dreams of escaping her small town existence and her alcoholic, widowed mother. Lately, meat and blood have started to upset her and her sleep is plagued by unsettling dreams in which she's either confronted by bloodthirsty creatures, or she runs at breakneck speed, something she excels at in everyday life, too. After learning she's been adopted, Amber decides to leave her old life behind and move to Chicago, but the owner of the apartment she plans to rent requires an advance deposit to be delivered before the following day at noon. Amber asks her best friend Susie to accompany her, and the road trip is eventually joined by Susie's boyfriend Peter, their friends Fiona and Ray, and Eric, a shy boy who's into Amber and contributes the means of transport for the group. Unfortunately, Eric's truck breaks down along the road. A friendly truck driver named Bernard stops by, and upon hearing he's also going to Chicago, Susie convinces him to give them a ride in the back of his semi, while Eric is selected to ride in the cabin with Bernard.

Amber and her friends become concerned when Bernard refuses to stop and they discover that his cargo consists of hundreds of cartons of blood. Concern turns into panic and terror when Bernard ends up taking them into an abandoned meat-packing plant that is soon revealed to be the training ground for a group of bloodthirsty creatures. Ray, Peter and Fiona are in turn attacked by the creatures, who dismember them. Amber and Susie manage to escape the first assault thanks to an improvised Molotov; while trying to reach a safe area, they stumble upon a wounded Eric, who's been taken from the truck's cabin to be used as bait. Amber tries to rescue Eric but he ends up thrown down a tall metal structure by the creatures, who possess a supernatural ability to run, climb and jump.

Amber and Susie overhear the leader of the creatures, Veronica, talking with her second-in-command and Bernard. Veronica refers to the creatures as her children, and aims to make them learn how to hunt human prey; to this goal, she has coaxed Bernard into helping her find fresh victims, which are usually junkies.

Following another attack, Amber and Susie are separated; Amber manages to pin down and interrogate one of the creatures, a young man who admits he's never hunted before, and tells Amber that Veronica is not their actual mother but she nonetheless takes care of them. In the end, Amber ends up surrounded by dozens of the creatures and by Veronica herself; trying to escape, she suddenly climbs up a wall in the same way the creatures do. Confused and frightened, she's recognized by Veronica as one of them, a "late bloomer" who was abducted by mistake. Veronica welcomes her warmly among her children, gives her some blood from the cargo, then offers her a captured Susie as her first true meal. Amber refuses to kill and eat her friend, and ignites a large gasoline spill, jumping away with Susie in her arms right in time to avoid the catastrophic conflagration.

Veronica orders the survivors to let Amber go, being sure she'll be back once she'll have accepted her true nature. Amber takes Susie to safety, then attacks and devours a homeless man who was going to assault Susie, while the latter watches in terror. After she's finished with her "meal", Amber reassures Susie she's still her friend and they'll be okay.

== Cast ==
- Courtney Hope as Amber
- Ruta Gedmintas as Susie
- Joshua Bowman as Peter
- Perdita Weeks as Fiona
- Jamie Blackley as Ray
- Oliver Hawes as Eric
- Bruce Payne as Bernard
- Saxon Trainor as Veronica

== Production ==
After Dark Films began with the shooting of the splatter film in August 2009 in Sofia, Bulgaria. After Dark produced the film in association with Dobré Films and in cooperation with Lionsgate and NBC Universal’s fantasy Channel Syfy.

== Release ==
The film premiered on September 4, 2010 and the theatrical release occurred in January 2011. The DVD was released in April 2011.

== Reception ==
The film has received mixed reviews. Matt Withers, who reviewed the film for JoBlo.com, praised both "the cast, and the character development". He stated that Courtney Hope is a "believable" leading lady and that "Bruce Payne shows up as a trucker in a throwaway role that he makes anything but". Another reviewer stated that "though this was a quick, basic and entertaining piece that could have been a run-of-the-mill movie with different direction, less measurement and passion put into, not to mention it's a simple story that only has a few conventions tweaked around and isn't the most original out there, but the way it carried itself was turned into an effective experience that urges forward". Boston Haverhill stated that the film "is a refreshing, brutal, nasty, enjoyable piece of work". A different reviewer stated that "the movie was good on most levels, but it is just the same old boring storyline that I have seen so many times with nothing to make it stand out". Frank Fulci stated that the director and his team managed to make the "beautiful cast of youngsters work to his advantage" and also managed "to take the overly popular vampire subgenre and shake things up a bit". Fulci commented that "never have we seen a vampire film like this and it still amazes me that this can be said almost 200 years after the first literary appearance of a vampire, in John William Polidori's 1819 novella, The Vampyre". Scott Weinberg stated that the film was "not bad" and a "mash-up of the 'isolation stalker' concept and a "night of the hungry vampires" pitch". Heather Wixson gave the film three out of five stars and stated that "when the movie picks up the pace during the second and third acts, director Syversen knows how to keep the tension and body count building until the film's deadly climax". R.L. Shaffer gave the film five stars out of ten and stated that while it is "run-of-the-mill is nearly every way, at least Prowl is scary on occasion".
