= Kurt Wimmer =

American film director, screenwriter and producer

- Born: March 9, 1964 (age 62); Honolulu, Hawaii, United States
- Occupations: Film director; film producer; screenwriter
- Years active: 1995–present

Kurt Wimmer (born March 9, 1964) is an American screenwriter, film producer and film director.

== Biography ==
He attended the University of South Florida and graduated with a BFA degree in Art History. He then moved to Los Angeles, where he worked for 12 years as a screenwriter before directing the 2002 film Equilibrium. In numerous interviews, he cites Equilibrium as his directorial debut and first film, although his actual directorial debut was the 1995 action film One Tough Bastard starring Brian Bosworth and Bruce Payne. However, Equilibrium was his first theatrically released film.

Wimmer has gone on to write for various films, mostly of the action and thriller genres. This includes The Recruit (2003), Law Abiding Citizen (2009), Salt (2010), Expend4bles (2023) and The Beekeeper (2024), respectively.

== Filmography ==
Year	Title	Credited as			Notes
Year	Title	Director	Writer	Producer	Notes
1995	One Tough Bastard	Yes	No	No	
1998	Sphere	No	Adaptation	No	
1999	The Thomas Crown Affair	No	Yes	No	
2002	Equilibrium	Yes	Yes	No	Role: Rebel victim (cameo)
2003	The Recruit	No	Yes	No	
2006	Ultraviolet	Yes	Yes	No	Role: Hemophage (cameo)
2008	Street Kings	No	Yes	No	
2009	Law Abiding Citizen	No	Yes	Yes	
2010	Salt	No	Yes	No	
2012	Total Recall	No	Yes	No	
2015	Point Break	No	Yes	Yes	
2020	Children of the Corn	Yes	Yes	Executive	
2020	Spell	No	Yes	Yes	
2021	The Misfits	No	Yes	No	
2023	Expend4bles	No	Yes	No	
2024	The Beekeeper	No	Yes	Yes	
2027	The Beekeeper 2	No	Yes	Yes	Post-production
2027	The Thomas Crown Affair	No	Yes	No	Post-production
