= The Antwerp Dolls =

- Directed by: Jake Reid
- Written by: Jake Reid
- Starring: Jason Wing; Bruce Payne; Sean Cronin
- Cinematography: Mike Marchlewski
- Edited by: Josie Granger
- Music by: Josh Wynter
- Production company: Liberal Region Productions
- Release dates: 21 March 2015 (Garden State); 30 May 2016
- Running time: 90 minutes
- Country: United Kingdom
- Language: English

The Antwerp Dolls is a 2015 British action/crime/thriller film written and directed by Jake Reid and starring Jason Wing, Bruce Payne and Sean Cronin.

== Premise ==
A ruthless businessman's payoff to the Belgian mafia is intercepted by his revenge-seeking former protegees, launching a deadly war of violence and double-dealing.

== Cast ==
- Jason Wing as Cally
- Bruce Payne as Ray Ferrino
- Sean Cronin as Max Ferrino
- Sebastien Foucan as Marco
- Courtney Winston as Blacks
- Jermaine Curtis Liburd as Spacey
- Simon Pengelly as Steve
- Ashley R Woods as Corey
- Terence Anderson as Mike
- Danny Cutler as Sonny
- Katya Greer as Jane
- Nick Orchard as George
- Manveer Sohal as Amir
- Sean Earl McPherson as Manny
- Kate Marie Davies as Christy
- Tobias Jon as Floyd

== Reception ==
The film has had screenings at a number of film festivals internationally, including the Annual Garden State Film Festival and won best feature film at the inaugural Poinciana Film Festival. Martin Stocks stated that 'despite some inevitable technical limitations due to the limited budget, The Antwerp Dolls looked impressive and left me wanting to re-watch it'. Stocks also stated that Bruce Payne and Sean Cronin were 'excellent' as the Ferrino brothers, 'with Payne quietly sinister and Cronin a more brooding presence'. Mondo Squallido stated that 'there may be a bit too much going on in this film, but I enjoyed it'. In Tony Black's view 'there's only one, slight reason to watch The Antwerp Dolls and it can be described in two words: Bruce Payne. Black stated that 'Payne is one of those B-movie actors with such slimy, educated delivery you can't help but enjoy him chewing the scenery, even when he's given the kind of painful direlogue Reid affords him in his amateurish script; one specific court-holding monologue about monkeys and dolphins is hilarious because it's trying to be so poignant'. Black lamented that 'Payne barely appears and instead we lurch from one set of tedious, morose, cartoonish Cockney villains to the next, all mostly shouting and growling angrily as they clomp their way through a narrative that wishes it was Scorsese-clever, but feels like Vinnie Jones with a hangover'.
