= Full Eclipse =

1993 American TV Movie

- Genre: Sci-Fi; Crime; Horror
- Written by: Richard Christian Matheson; Michael Reaves
- Directed by: Anthony Hickox
- Starring: Mario Van Peebles; Patsy Kensit; Bruce Payne; Anthony John Denison; Jason Beghe; Paula Marshall; Victoria Rowell
- Theme music composer: Gary Chang
- Country of origin: United States
- Original language: English

Production
- Executive producer: David R. Ginsburg
- Producers: Peter Abrams; Robert L. Levy
- Production location: Los Angeles
- Cinematography: Sandi Sissel
- Editor: Peter Amundson
- Running time: 93 minutes
- Production companies: Citadel Entertainment; HBO Pictures; Tapestry Films

Original release
- Network: HBO
- Release: November 27, 1993

Full Eclipse is a 1993 science fiction crime film directed by Anthony Hickox. Starring Mario Van Peebles and Bruce Payne, the story is set in Los Angeles where the police department has assembled a unique squad of officers who possess the ability to turn into werewolves. The tagline of the film was: There's a new police force on the streets... and they only come out at night.

== Plot ==
Max Dire is a Los Angeles detective who is feeling the strain that his profession entails when his wife of two years, Liza, accuses him of bringing his work home. Max's partner, Jim Sheldon, commits suicide by shooting himself in the head. Realising that Max is experiencing problems, Adam Garou, a high-ranking officer, distinguished by his success in reducing crime in other big cities, invites Max to join him at his apartment for a weekly meeting with other police officers who are experiencing difficulties. Adam advises Max that since he is a good detective, he should try to solve his problems rather than quitting the force. Although Max is sceptical as to whether he will derive any benefit from the meeting, as he and his wife had already attended counselling sessions without success, he reluctantly attends the meeting where he meets other police officers such as Casey Spencer and Ramon Perez. Everyone who Max meets at the meeting praises the impact that Garou's influence has had on their fortunes. Max soon realizes that the activities of the group also entail embarking on vigilante missions to clean the streets of criminals. Max notices that each of the group members injects themselves with a strange chemical, which he learns has been produced by Garou. After they have injected this chemical, Garou and his team become more powerful and seemingly impervious to injury. The next day Max attempts to advise his incredulous boss of the strange goings on, but to no avail. Max eventually begins taking the chemical and participating in the vigilante missions. However, he meets a deformed ex-police officer, who used to work with Garou, in a holding cell. The ex-officer warns Max that after the streets are cleaned of crime, all of the officers who work with Garou are killed (though he had escaped). He also explained that his deformity was caused by overuse of the chemical. Max subsequently finds Garou extracting the chemical from his own brain with a syringe and realizes that he is a werewolf.

== Cast ==
- Mario Van Peebles as Max Dire
- Patsy Kensit as Casey Spencer
- Bruce Payne as Adam Garou
- Anthony John Denison as Jim Sheldon
- Jason Beghe as Doug Crane
- Paula Marshall as Liza
- John Verea as Ramon Perez
- Dean Norris as Fleming
- Willie C. Carpenter as Ron Edmunds
- Victoria Rowell as Anna Dire
- Scott Paulin as Teague
- Mel Winkler as Stratton
- Joseph Culp as Detective Tom Davies

== Reception ==
The film has received mixed to positive reviews. Kim Newman, who reviewed the film for Empire magazine, described it as "harebrained fun with lotsa guns and lotsa cool lines". Joseph Savitski, who reviewed the film for Beyond Hollywood, stated that although the film is "slick and entertaining, it's too bad Full Eclipse is never able to live up to its innovative concept and become a superior werewolf movie". Savitski also commented that "Payne is masterful as Detective Garou, a seductive and evil villain with arrogance and confidence to spare. When he's on-screen, Payne demands the attention of the audience, and you're hard pressed to resist his performance. Payne is also the perfect adversary, the kind you're supposed to hate, but who has the charisma to draw you in nonetheless". The script writer Richard Christian Matheson stated that "most monsters have a sort of grudge against humanity, but I don't think Garou does: he simply dislikes crime. That makes him interesting, and Bruce really brings all of these nuances out. He's a wonderful actor and a very bright man". Matty Budrewicz of UK Horror Scene stated that Payne's performance was "completely electric..., unleashing a turn of magnetic and seductive evil". Bryan Kristopowitz stated that Full Eclipse 'is a very cool movie and a terrific concept'. Kristopowitz commented that "Mario Van Peebles does a good job as Max Dire", "Patsy Kensit does a fine job as Casey", and that Bruce Payne is terrific as Garou because "he just oozes malice and sleaze before you even know what Garou is all about, and then Payne somehow manages to amp up all of Garou’s horrible qualities". Another reviewer stated that Full Eclipse "is an epic action/horror hybrid with enough twists and turns to keep every viewer engaged".

Gary Collinson stated that "what Full Eclipse lacks in logic (and humour) it makes up for in John Woo-esque action sequences and a reasonable budget to unleash a decent amount of destruction". Another reviewer described the film as "like an early 90's John Woo flick, only with werewolves" and stated that "while Mario Van Peebles was excellent as the lead, special attention must be made to the lead villain here, played by none other than resident bad guy Bruce Payne, and oh my word is he just amazing here'. In Dan Lopez's view although Full Eclipse 'is initially exciting and interesting, it decays into an overly simplistic, badly orchestrated horror film about midway through". Garrett Collins stated that the film was a "pretty pleasurable hour and a half, which is also infused with a real listenable, almost John Carpenter-ish score by Gary Chang" and that "Peebles is watchable enough, and Payne (Passenger 57) is a slimy bad guy". Scott Weinberg described the film as a "so-so amalgam of cop procedural and werewolf mayhem". Ryan Turek noted the influence of the X-Men comics on the film and stated that it was "awesome" and "overlooked".
