= Our Kid (film) =

Film directed by Sean Cronin

- Directed by: Sean Cronin
- Written by: Daniel P. Lewis
- Produced by: Sean Cronin; Colin Cromby; Daniel P. Lewis; Chris Parrott
- Starring: Daniel P. Lewis; Poppie Jae Hughes; Leanne Best; Connor McIntyre; Ricky Tomlinson
- Edited by: Will Simpson
- Production company: Dock House Media Group
- Release date: 31 October 2023
- Country: United Kingdom
- Language: English

Our Kid is a 2023 British comedy drama film directed by Sean Cronin and starring Daniel P. Lewis, Poppie Jae Hughes, Leanne Best, Connor McIntyre and Ricky Tomlinson.

== Plot ==
The film is about a working-class family, the Reillys, who reside in Liverpool. The daughter of the family, Laura Reilly, is a twelve-year-old girl with the ambition of playing football professionally. Although Laura has many footballing heroes, her older brother, Thomas, is her biggest hero. His inspirational quest to raise money for charity through a sponsored bike ride, while overcoming the challenges he faces from his cerebral palsy, shows Laura and the rest of the community what determination and perseverance can achieve.

== Cast ==
- Daniel P. Lewis as Thomas Reilly
- Poppie Jae Hughes as Laura Reilly
- Leanne Best as Sarah
- Connor McIntyre as John Reilly
- Ricky Tomlinson as Phil Reilly
- Louis Emerick as Tucker
- Mark Moraghan as Mark Parrott
- John McArdle as Alan Reilly
- Amanda Clapham as Emily
- Angela Dixon as Ms Summers
- Sharon Byatt as Tracey Reilly
- Chris Parrott as Ronnie
- Steve O'Keefe as Slim
- Jake Abraham as Karl

== Production ==
The film is based on the 2016 short film Thomas. Some of the scenes in the film were shot at Prenton Park, the ground of the football team Tranmere Rovers.

== Release and Reception ==
The film premiered at the Rain Dance Film Festival in London in October 2023. One reviewer stated that the film was 'a wonderful mix of both comedy and emotional drama that takes us into the lives of the Reilly family in Liverpool who are certainly facing some tough times in their lives'. Another reviewer described the film as 'an awesome rollercoaster ride' and praised the outstanding performances of Daniel P Lewis and Poppie Jae Hughes.
