= Jeff Kober =

American actor (born 1953)

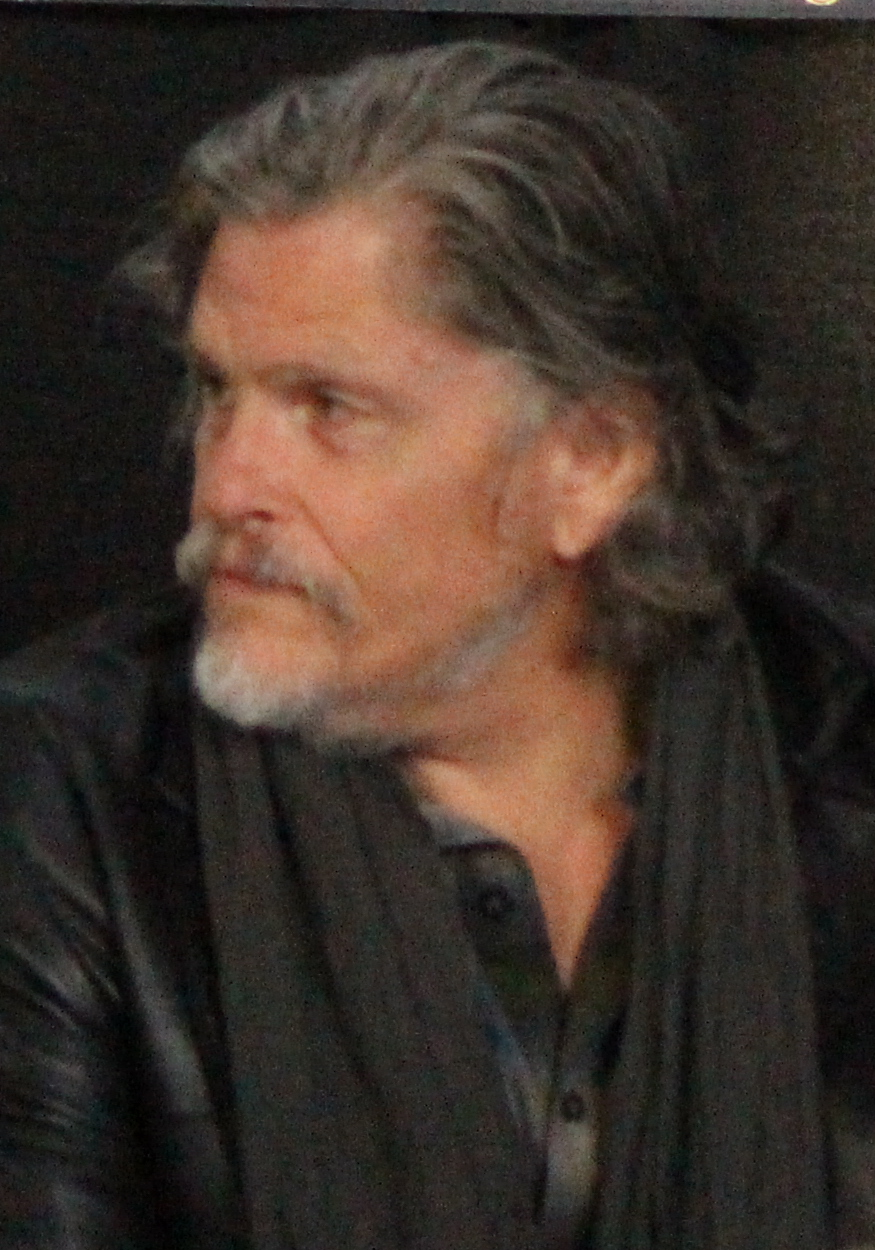
- Kober at the 2015 Walker Stalker Con
- Born: December 18, 1953 (age 72); Billings, Montana, U.S.
- Occupation: Actor
- Years active: 1985–present
- Spouses: Rhonda Talbot (m. 1989–?); Kelly Cutrone (m. 1998–?); Adele Slaughter (m. 2013)
- Children: 1

Jeff Kober (born December 18, 1953) is an American actor, known for his television roles as Dodger in China Beach, Jacob Hale Jr. in Sons of Anarchy, Joe in the fourth season of The Walking Dead, and Kurt Nypo in Walker: Texas Ranger. He is also known for his movie roles such as Roy Gaddis in Out of Bounds (1986), Patrick Channing in The First Power (1990), Marcus in One Tough Bastard (1995), and as Pomona Joe in A Man Apart (2003). In February 2020, Kober joined the cast of ABC's General Hospital as Cyrus Renault. He exited the role in June 2021, but has made occasional guest appearances from August to December of the same year, winning a Daytime Emmy Award for Outstanding Supporting Actor in a Drama Series for his performance in the role in 2022.

== Early life ==
Kober was born and raised in Billings, Montana. He moved to the Los Angeles area in his twenties and studied acting with theater educator Ed Kaye-Martin.

== Career ==
Kober may be best known as Dodger in China Beach and Daedalus in the short-lived cult horror series Kindred: The Embraced. He has made guest appearances on such television series as Buffy the Vampire Slayer, Law & Order: Special Victims Unit, CSI: Crime Scene Investigation, ER, 24, The Closer, New Girl, Criminal Minds, Star Trek: Voyager, and Star Trek: Enterprise. He played the character Julian Bradley in the two-part 1985 episode entitled "The Monster: Part 1&2" on Highway to Heaven. He played Jacob Hale Jr. in the FX series Sons of Anarchy and Joe in the AMC series The Walking Dead. He also featured as DJ Ray from Reef Radio in Bacardi 1990s 'serve chilled' advertising campaign. In 2013, Kober reprised his role as Daedalus for the Kindred: The Embraced DVD set in a special features segment called "Daedalus: The Last Will and Testament," which is meant for Abel (the boy Daedalus wanted to embrace in the episode "Romeo and Juliet"), who is now an adult and was embraced by Julian Luna as Kindred. He played a role in the 2005 film Love's Long Journey. He appeared in an episode of It's Always Sunny in Philadelphia titled "Gun Fever Too: Still Hot".

On June 24, 2022, Kober won the Daytime Emmy Award for Outstanding Supporting Actor in a Drama Series for his role as Cyrus Renault on General Hospital.

In 2026, having submitted himself for the nomination, Kober was nominated for a Primetime Emmy Award for Outstanding Guest Actor in a Drama Series, for playing motorcycle mechanic Duke Ekins in six episodes of The Pitt. Mr. Kober also was nominated in 2026 for a Daytime Emmy Award for Outstanding Guest Performance in a Daytime Drama Series for his role as Cyrus Renault on General Hospital. He is the first actor to be nominated for both a Primetime Emmy Award and a Daytime Emmy Award in the same year.

== Personal life ==
Kober is a bass guitarist and is a former member of The Walking Wounded.

Kober visited Vietnam with co-star Dana Delany during filming of the television drama series China Beach (1988), which was based on U.S. involvement in the Vietnam War. Their visit is documented in the Dana Delany episode of the series Intimate Portrait (1993), which features a discussion and photographs of their journey.

Kober is a noted artist who is responsible for the paintings attributed to his character Daedalus on Kindred: The Embraced (1996). Kober and Slaughter co-authored Art That Pays: The Emerging Artist's Guide to Making a Living.

== Filmography ==
=== Film ===
Year	Title	Role	Notes
1986	Out of Bounds	Roy Gaddis	
1988	Viper	Matt Thomas / Richard Gelb	
1988	Alien Nation	Josh Strader	
1988	Lucky Stiff	Ike	
1990	The First Power	Patrick Channing	
1993	The Hit List	Richard Cordon	
1993	The Baby Doll Murders	Louis	
1995	Automatic	Major West	
1995	Tank Girl	Booga	
1996	One Tough Bastard	Marcus	
1996	Demolition High	Luther	
1997	The Big Fall	Johnny 'Axe' Roosevelt	
1997	The Maker	Rubicon Beziqui	
1999	Inferno	Beserko	
2000	Militia	Tom Jeffries	Uncredited
2001	The Want	Zed	
2002	Defining Maggie	Buddy	
2002	Enough	"FBI Agent"	
2003	A Man Apart	Pomona Joe	
2004	Hidalgo	Sergeant at Wounded Knee	
2004	World Without Waves	Doug	
2007	The Hills Have Eyes 2	Redding	
2008	Multiple	Terry	
2011	Re-Cut	John Fowler	
2012	Perfection	Harry	
2012	The Guilt Trip	Jimmy	
2015	Bad Blood	Ray Baker	
2016	Sully	LT Cook	
2016	River Guard	Detective Mitchell	
2017	Lost Cat Corona	Sue	
2017	Beauty Mark	Bruce	
2018	Leave No Trace	Mr. Walters	
2018	Above All Things	Mr. Swanson	
2018	Dead Sound	Stone	
2018	What Still Remains	Zack	
2019	Char Man	Kent Bridewell	
2019	Lie Exposed	The Photographer	
2021	Topology of Sirens	Dad	
2023	Self Reliance	The Cowboy	

=== Television ===
Year	Title	Role	Notes
1985	V	Visitor Officer	Episode: "The Hero"
1985	Highway to Heaven	Julian Bradley	2 episodes
1985	The Twilight Zone	Younger Cop	Episode: "Night of the Meek"
1986–1987	Falcon Crest	Guy Stafford	7 episodes
1987	MacGyver	Matt Bell	Episode: "Pirates"
1987	Ohara	Frankie Nelson	Episode: "Toshi"
1987	Laguna Heat	Vic Harmon	Television film
1988–1991	China Beach	Sgt. Evan 'Dodger' Winslow	57 episodes
1992	Ned Blessing: The True Story of My Life	Tors Buckner	Television film
1992	Keep the Change	Billy Kelton	Television film
1992	Angel Street	Father Juan Yasztremski	Episode: "Midnight Times a Hundred"
1993	The Hat Squad	Sgt. Dan Coltrain	Episode: "Dead Man Walking"
1993	Desperate Rescue: The Cathy Mahone Story	J.D. Roberts	Television film
1993	The X-Files	Bear	Episode: "Ice"
1993	A Matter of Justice	Talbot	Television film
1994	The Commish	Gary Spurling/Vincent Spears	Episode: "Bank Job"
1994	The Innocent	Tinsley	Television film
1994	Higher Education	Dale Evans	4 episodes
1994, 1997	Walker, Texas Ranger	Kurt Nypo / Russell Stafford	3 episodes
1995	Earth 2	The Z.E.D.	Episode: "Redemption"
1996	Women: Stories of Passion	Vincent	Episode: "Sing, Sing Me the Blues"
1996	The Lazarus Man	Matz	Episode: "The Hold-Up"
1996	Kindred: The Embraced	Daedalus	8 episodes
1997	Gold Coast	Roland Crowe	Television film
1997, 1998	Nothing Sacred	Michael Reyneaux	2 episodes
1998	The Magnificent Seven	Morgan Coltrane	Episode: "Safecracker"
1998	The Advanced Guard	Desmond	Television film
1998	The Pretender	Clavell Dane	Episode: "Bank"
1998	C-16: FBI	Ringo Lattimer	Episode: "The Art of War"
1998	Logan's War: Bound by Honor	Sal Mercado	Television film
1999	Poltergeist: The Legacy	Raymond Corvus	2 episodes
1999	Seven Days	James Rance	Episode: "A Dish Best Served Cold"
1999	Charmed	Jackson Ward	Episode: "The Power of Two"
1999–2002	Buffy the Vampire Slayer	Rack / Zachary Kralik	4 episodes
2000	JAG	Rory Coulter	Episode: "Body Talk"
2000	American Tragedy	Bill Pavelic	Television film
2001	18 Wheels of Justice	Bobby	Episode: "Dance with the Devil"
2001	Star Trek: Voyager	Iko	Episode: "Repentance"
2001	Lost Voyage	Dazinger	Television film
2001, 2004	NYPD Blue	Leon / Tom	2 episodes
2002	Star Trek: Enterprise	Traeg	Episode: "Shadows of P'Jem"
2002	Crossing Jordan	Daryl Wood	Episode: "Crime & Punishment"
2002	ER	Toby and Matt's Dad	Episode: "First Snowfall"
2002	Windfall	Bennett	Television film
2003	The Shield	Bruce Rosen	Episode: "Inferno"
2003	Peacemakers	Major Hansen	Episode: "Dead to Rights"
2003	10-8: Officers on Duty	Ken Meade	Episode: "Blood Sugar Sex Magik"
2003	The Guardian	Fred Murphy	Episode: "Believe"
2003, 2012	CSI: Crime Scene Investigation	Walter Hicks / Roger Wilder	2 episodes
2004	Law & Order: Special Victims Unit	Abraham / Eugene Hoff	Episode: "Charisma"
2004, 2006	Dr. Vegas	Mitch	2 episodes
2005	Criminal Minds	Leo	Episode: "Derailed"
2005	Love's Long Journey	Mason	Television film
2006	24	Conrad Haas	Episode: "Day 5: 7:00 a.m.-8:00 a.m."
2006	The Closer	Scott Campbell	Episode: "To Protect & to Serve"
2007	Supernatural	Randall	Episode: "Folsom Prison Blues"
2008	Aces 'N' Eights	Tate	Television film
2008	Reaper	Dennis	Episode: "Greg, Schmeg"
2008	The Cleaner	Tom Porter	Episode: "House of Pain"
2008	Numbers	Brady	Episode: "Conspiracy Theory"
2009	Cold Case	Jack Dubinski	Episode: "Lotto Fever"
2009	Burn Notice	Falcone	Episode: "Friends and Family"
2009	Mending Fences	Jack Norris Jr.	Television film
2009–2013	Sons of Anarchy	Jacob Hale Jr.	13 episodes
2010	Lost	Mechanic	Episode: "What Kate Does"
2010	CSI: Miami	Glenn Harper	Episode: "Dishonor"
2010	Law & Order: LA	Toomey	Episode: "Harbor City"
2011	Breakout Kings	Harry Lee Reddin	Episode: "Fun with Chemistry"
2012	New Girl	Remy	4 episodes
2013	It's Always Sunny in Philadelphia	Gun Seller	Episode: "Gun Fever Too: Still Hot"
2014	The Walking Dead	Joe	4 episodes
2014	NCIS: New Orleans	Brick Myers	Episode: "Chasing Ghosts"
2016	Shameless	Jupiter	2 episodes
2016	Timeless	Davy Crockett	Episode: "The Alamo"
2016	12 Deadly Days	Dad	Episode: "Love Bites"
2017	His Wives and Daughters	Eddie Ray Banks	Episode: "Pilot"
2017–2018	The Walking Dead: Red Machete	Joe	3 episodes
2017–2018	NCIS: Los Angeles	Harris Keane	8 episodes
2018	Van Helsing	Simon	Episode: "Christ Pose"
2019	Sneaky Pete	Jacques Reynard	Episode: "The Stamford Trust Fall"
2019, 2021	Truth Be Told	Jerbic	2 episodes
2020	Interrogation	Drake	Episode: "Henry Fisher vs Eric Fisher 1992"
2020	Bosch	John the Baptist	Episode: "Money, Honey"
2020	Big Dogs	Capt. DiBiasi	7 episodes
2020	The Church of Mike	Randy Pope	Episode: "The Church of Mike"
2020–2025	General Hospital	Cyrus Renault	168 episodes
2021	Big Sky	Mr. Kennedy	2 episodes
2026	The Pitt	Duke	Season 2; Recurring Role
