= Creators: The Past =

- Directed by: Piergiuseppe Zaia
- Written by: Piergiuseppe Zaia; Eleonora Fani
- Produced by: Piergiuseppe Zaia; Eleonora Fani; Bruce Payne; Michel Vandewalle
- Starring: Eleonora Fani; Bruce Payne; Jennifer Mischiati; Per Fredrik Åsly; Marc Fiorini; Gérard Depardieu; William Shatner
- Cinematography: Ezio Gamba
- Edited by: Andrea Torreano; Simone Fava; Walter Volpatto; George Koran; Paul Lavoie
- Music by: Piergiuseppe Zaia
- Production companies: Atlas International; Artuniverse
- Distributed by: Europictures
- Release date: 8 October 2020
- Running time: 97 minutes
- Country: Italy
- Language: English
- Budget: c. 8 million euros
- Box office: c. 130,000 euros (domestic)

Creators: The Past is an Italian science fiction fantasy film directed by Piergiuseppe Zaia, who also co-wrote the screenplay with Eleonora Fani and composed the soundtrack. The film stars Eleonora Fani, Jennifer Mischiati, Bruce Payne, and Per Fredrik Åsly in the lead roles, and features guest appearances by Gérard Depardieu and William Shatner. The story is about how the destinies of mankind are being manipulated by a race of powerful extraterrestrials known as the Creators.

The film was announced as the first part of a planned trilogy, whose next two installments would have been Creators: The Present and Creators: The Future. Principal photography began in 2014, but the film did not receive general release until 2020; its release in Italy then suffered from the COVID-19 pandemic, and it flopped at the box office. The film later generated some curiosity in Italy due to the script's allusions to conspiracy theories.

== Plot ==
The film provides a fictional explanation as to why the alleged Mayan prophecy did not come to pass. As the end of the year 2012 arrives, the universe is about to undergo an extraordinary planetary alignment which will cause a total eclipse to be visible from planet Earth. The eight members of the Galactic Council regulating the stability of the universe gather to discuss the effects of the coming alignment. Each of the godlike members of the council is a "Creator" governing their own planet. All the data regarding the planets, including the secrets about the DNA of their respective species, are recorded into mystical objects known as the lens.

Following the rebellion of Lord Kanaff, the regent of planet Earth, the Galactic Council loses control of the lens which contains the recording of the entire history and the memories of humanity. The data contained in the object includes the secret that mankind was created by aliens and that all religions are a sham to keep humanity under control. Sofy, a young woman who was abducted as a child by aliens, is entrusted by the Creators with the task of locating the missing lens. The female warrior Lady Airre is sent by the council of the Creators to capture Lord Kanaff. Meanwhile, another Creator, Lord Kal, has been secretly plotting to take control of Earth through the Illuminati, in order to replace his own dying planet.

== Cast ==
- Eleonora Fani as Lady Airre, an emissary of the Creators
- Bruce Payne as Lord Kal, a villainous Creator who wants to take control of planet Earth
- Jennifer Mischiati as Sofy, a young woman entrusted with finding the missing lens
- Per Fredrik Åsly as Alex Walker, a young doctor who helps Sofy in her quest
- Marc Fiorini as Lord Kanaff, the regent of planet Earth
- William Shatner as Lord Ogmha, chairman of the Creators' Galactic Council
- Gérard Depardieu as the Master of Faith, an agent of the Creators who secretly oversees all of Earth's religions
- Ksenia Prohaska as Dr. Ferrari, one of Lord Kal's evil minions
- Angelo Minoli as Natan, a man created by Lady Airre using the DNA of Jesus Christ
- Sébastien Foucan as Tammuz, Natan's "brother"
- Yohann Chopin as Chris Walker
- Elio Pascarelli as Young Natan
- Elisabetta Coraini as Elizabeth
- Pete Antico as Lord Marduk, a member of the Galactic council
- Daniel McVicar as Dan Anderson
- Kristina Pimenova as Singing Child
- Jonna Cambrand as Joro
- Mauro Biglino as himself
- Piergiuseppe Zaia as Jesus Christ

== Production ==
The film originated with a project by music composer and festival organizer Piergiuseppe Zaia and psychologist and alternative medicine therapist Eleonora Fani. Zaia and Fani co-wrote the screenplay, with Zaia directing the film and Fani playing one of the lead roles. The film was shot on location in Italy, mostly in the Piedmont region. Locations included the province of Biella and the historical area of Canavese in Piedmont, as well as the Aosta Valley and Venice. Some scenes were filmed at the Verrès Castle and the Castle Savoia. The city of Biella and its province were actively involved in the making of the film, for which they provided locations as well as funding. The film's production also received support from the province's Confederation of Industry branch. Gérard Depardieu's involvement in the production reportedly played an important role in gaining support from public authorities in the Biella province. Michel J. Vandewalle, who had been an executive producer on Iron Sky (2012), worked on the film in a similar capacity.

The film's budget was reported to be about 8 million euros. Part of the funding came from contributions by businesses from the Biella province, who were incited to invest a minimum of 12,500 euros. Some businesses reportedly invested hundreds of thousands. In Canavese, private individuals reportedly invested in the picture through their banker. The production company was also granted a tax credit of over 765, 000 euros by the Italian ministry of culture. In 2021, after the film had been completed and released, the ministry granted the production company an incentive of about 389,000 euros, plus 71,000 euros to compensate for the COVID-related difficulties.

Principal photography started in 2014. The first scenes involving Gérard Depardieu and Bruce Payne were shot in October of that year. Post-production took place at FotoKem in Burbank. The film, originally slated for a release in February 2016, remained unreleased at that date. In December 2017, director Zaia said that the film was "almost ready" for worldwide distribution and that it had been delayed in part due to the extensive use of green screen and special effects, and to the addition of new scenes involving new actors. As the film had been shot in English, the Italian dubbing had not yet been completed at that point.

== Promotion ==
The official trailer was shown on January 17, 2019, on Vimeo. A novelization, co-authored by Fani with her mother Gea Mizzani Corio, was released in February 2020 only in Italian.

== Soundtrack ==
The end credits theme song "Across Endless Dimensions" is performed by Dimash Kudaibergen. Director Piergiuseppe Zaia composed the song as well as the rest of the soundtrack.

== Release ==
The film's trailer was released on March 6, 2019. Also in 2019, the film premiered in China at the Shanghai International Film Festival and in Santa Monica, United States at the Atlas International Film Exhibition. A promotional tour commenced in Italy at the Lucca Comics & Games festival. The film was first set to be theatrically released on March 13, 2020 but this was delayed due to the COVID-19 pandemic. The film was eventually released in cinemas in Italy on October 8, 2020, but was pulled from distribution two weeks later when Italian theaters closed again due to the resurging pandemic.

The film then remained entirely unavailable for over two years, generating some interest from Italian reviewers. On February 7, 2023, it was released to streaming on Amazon Prime, licensed exclusively in Italy and Vatican City, with only Italian dubs. A DVD, also with the Italian version, was released in 2023. The English-language version was later released on Amazon's video rental services.

== Reception ==
Giancarlo Zappoli of mymovies.it stated that the film's two strengths were its notable cast and the foray into fantasy and sci-fi (unusual for contemporary Italian films) but that the screenplay suffered from an abundance of subplots. Valerio Molinaro of Corriere spettacolo praised the film's scenography and its "first-rate choral cast" but found the screenplay "not always up to par". Antonio Palazzo of extratek.com commented that the film "is an ambitious all-Italian Blockbuster, with an excellent background story" and good performances from "world-famous actors" but that the screenplay was often confusing and that the film's running time did not allow the story to develop as it should have. Fiaba Di Martino of Film TV magazine criticized the screenplay and the underwritten characters, and compared the movie to an overenthusiastic fan film made for YouTube. Martina Catrambone of themacguffin.it wrote that the writing, editing, music, and special effects did not make any sense, and stated that such a film proved that Italian cinema should avoid science fiction. Alberto Mutignani of the online magazine The Walk of Fame called it "the worst film of the year", stating that the film ended up being an unintentional comedy, with a story so confusing that one wondered if some scenes were missing.

Creators: the Past ranked ninth at the Italian box office during its first weekend, earning 69,000 euros. Some sources say it earned between 120,000 and 130,000 euros before its release was cut short by the resurging COVID-19 pandemic. The revenue for the producers, after deduction of ticket sales fees, was reported to be a mere 47,000 euros.

In January 2021, director Piergiuseppe Zaia stated that despite the film's aborted release, he and Fani were working on what would be the second installment of the trilogy. However, his production company, Artuniverse, was liquidated in December 2023 due to its inability to generate revenues. In 2025, Zaia said that he was no longer involved in filmmaking.

== Controversies ==
Upon the film's release, a reviewer noted that the story alluded to all sorts of conspiracy theories, as evidenced by the cameo of author Mauro Biglino.

Since the film became available again, it has gained minor "cult" status in Italy due to its conspiracist content.

After the film's 2020 release, Eleonora Fani gained some following on YouTube and Telegram, publishing videos where she appeared to take seriously the film's content, including theories about ancient astronauts. She went on to publish geopolitical content that praised Donald Trump and Vladimir Putin, and to promote QAnon-influenced conspiracy theories.

In 2025, several private investors who had participated in the film's funding filed a complaint against Zaia, Fani, and a banker who had organised the fundraising, saying that they had been defrauded. The disgruntled investors said the film never had a proper distribution plan. Zaia blamed the COVID-19 pandemic for the project's failure.
