= Silence Like Glass =

- Directed by: Carl Schenkel
- Written by: Bea Hellmann; Carl Schenkel
- Produced by: Michael Röhrig; Carl Schenkel
- Starring: Jami Gertz; Martha Plimpton; George Peppard; Bruce Payne; Rip Torn
- Music by: Anne Dudley
- Distributed by: Moviestore Entertainment
- Release date: 1989
- Running time: 104 minutes
- Countries: Germany; United States
- Language: English

Silence Like Glass (German title: Zwei Frauen) is a 1989 German-American drama film. Though made in Germany, it is set in America and features an American cast with all English dialogue. The film stars Jami Gertz, Martha Plimpton, George Peppard, Bruce Payne, and Rip Torn.

== Plot ==
Eva is a wealthy, snobbish ballerina who is diagnosed with cancer. She is admitted into the youth cancer ward at a hospital where she is forced into humility by her disease. She rooms with fellow cancer patient Claudia, and the majority of the film revolves around their interactions together in their hospital room. She is treated with "concern and compassion" by Dr. Burton.

Ultimately Eva goes into remission and is able to continue her life, but not before witnessing another young woman's death and also assisting Claudia to suicide.

== Cast ==
- Jami Gertz as Eva Martin
- Martha Plimpton as Claudia Jacoby
- George Peppard as Mr. Martin
- Bruce Payne as Dr. Burton
- Rip Torn as Dr. Markowitz
- Gayle Hunnicutt as Mrs. Martin

== Production ==
Filming took place in West Germany in autumn 1988. The film opened the Munich film festival in the summer of 1989. Actress Martha Plimpton shaved her head for this role, a move that would influence the direction of her career for the next several years. She appeared bald in the 1989 film Parenthood and accompanied her then-boyfriend River Phoenix to the Oscars with a bald head.

== Reception ==
The film was nominated for Outstanding Feature Film at the German Film Awards. Sam Frank stated that the film was 'engrossing throughout with a directorial style by Carl Schenkel that is witty and inventive, yet unafraid to stare death in the face'. He also stated that the film featured two female lead performances 'that are among the strongest and most accomplished of the year'. Similarly, Juliet Wittman stated that Gertz and Plimpton 'should receive Oscars for their fierce and lovely performances'. A reviewer for Variety stated that the film contained 'brilliant acting and tight direction'. James Cameron-Wilson described the film as 'a powerful, superbly played drama set in a cancer clinic'. Another reviewer stated that Silence Like Glass was a 'discussion-worthy, thought-provoking film'. Rosemarie Kuheim described the film as 'moving'. In contrast, Georg Seeßlen stated that Schenkel's efforts in 'combining the content of a German television film with the craft of an American genre film' did not succeed.

== Awards and honors ==
1990

German Film Awards 1990
Outstanding Feature Film (nominated)
