= One Tough Bastard =

- Directed by: Kurt Wimmer
- Written by: Steven Selling
- Produced by: William Webb
- Starring: Brian Bosworth; Bruce Payne; M.C. Hammer
- Cinematography: Jürgen Baum; John Huneck
- Edited by: Michael Thibault
- Music by: Anthony Marinelli
- Production companies: Live Entertainment; Westwind Productions
- Distributed by: HBO
- Release dates: December 10, 1995 (premiere); February 16, 1996 (US)
- Running time: 100 minutes
- Country: United States
- Language: English

One Tough Bastard, also known as One Man's Justice, is a 1995 American action thriller film directed by Kurt Wimmer in his feature film debut, and starring Brian Bosworth, Bruce Payne and M.C. Hammer. It premiered in the United States on HBO.

== Plot ==
Karl Savak, a "rogue FBI agent", is attempting to steal and sell military weapons. When stealing weaponry, one of Savak's henchmen, Marcus, kills Darlene and Marianne North, the wife and daughter of Army Staff Sgt. John North. North himself is shot and lapses into a coma for eight weeks. When he regains consciousness he discovers that Savak has put Marcus onto a witness protection program. As a result, North decides to enact his own justice and seeks revenge on Savak and his henchmen. At the end, it's revealed that Savak was the one behind the murders of North's family and he avenges them when he throws him off a roof and onto a piano, killing him.

== Cast ==
- Brian Bosworth as John North
- Bruce Payne as FBI Special Agent Karl Savak
- Jeff Kober as Marcus
- DeJuan Guy as Mikey Adams
- MC Hammer as Dexter Kane
- Neal McDonough as FBI Agent Ward
- M. C. Gainey as Hank
- Angelle Brooks as India Adams
- Robert Kotecki as FBI Agent Klark
- Leo Lam as Agent Tam
- Deborah Worthing as Darlene North
- Rachel Duncan as Marianne North
- Bruno Marcotulli as Colonel Allen Cornstead
- Robert LaSardo as Tattoist
- Clifton Collins Jr. as Jarhead

== Reception ==
The Bosworth vehicle has received mixed reviews, while praise was mostly given to Payne's performance. Christopher Armstead stated that one problem with the film was that 'the story...was all over the freaking place'. Nonetheless, Armstead thought that 'Jeff Kober was in his element playing a slimy, no good, back stabbing villain' and that Bruce Payne's character, Karl Savak, is one of the most 'entertaining movie villains in low budget action flick history'. Armstead stated that 'so awesome is Karl Savak that some lunatic has created a Facebook page in his honor'. Another reviewer stated that Stone Cold 'may be Brian Bosworth’s finest hour, but One Man’s Justice is a fitting encore' and that 'Bruce Payne, with his Whitesnake hair and nose ring is slimeball perfection as the villain'. A different reviewer described the film as a 'slice of red-blooded American Macho' and stated that it 'is the finest hour of Payne’s storied career, and he dutifully gives One Tough Bastard an energising kick to the Boz'. Another reviewer stated that the film contained some good performances, with 'Bosworth kicking some ass and showing some maturity in his second acting gig' but that 'when it's all said and done, it's Bruce Payne's villain that really makes the film what it is'. Jedadiah Leland stated that the film was 'a dumb but fun movie that’s enlivened by three actors [Bosworth, Payne and Kober] who know how to be convincingly tough on camera'. Robb Antequera stated that 'while the plot is standard action movie plot, the well handled/fast paced action, the compelling story, and the great cast & characters really help elevate the movie beyond its low budget origins'. Antequera also commented that the movie was a 'must watch' due to Payne's performance as Savak, which he stated deserved to be mentioned among other great villainous performances in action movies, such as Gavan O'Herlihy's portrayal of Manny Fraker in Death Wish 3, Vernon Wells' portrayal of Bennett in Commando, Alan Rickman's portrayal of Hans Gruber in Die Hard and John Lithgow's portrayal of Eric Qualen in Cliffhanger.
