= Victor Young Perez =

Victor "Young" Perez
- Directed by: Jacques Ouaniche
- Written by: Yoni Darmon; Jacques Ouaniche
- Produced by: Neil Kafsky
- Starring: Brahim Asloum; Isabella Orsini; Bruce Payne
- Cinematography: Pierre-Yves Bastard
- Edited by: Emmanuelle Mimran
- Production companies: France 3 Cinema; Mazel Productions; Noe Productions
- Release date: 20 November 2013 (France)
- Running time: 110 minutes
- Country: France
- Language: French
- Box office: $588,109

Victor "Young" Perez, also known as Surviving Auschwitz in the United Kingdom, is a 2013 French biographical sports drama film depicting the life of the boxer and Auschwitz concentration camp prisoner Victor Perez. The film was directed by Jacques Ouaniche, written by Jacques Ouaniche and Yoni Darmon, and stars Brahim Asloum as Perez, with Isabella Orsini and Bruce Payne in supporting roles.

== Plot ==
Victor "Young" Perez tells the astonishing, harrowing and poignant story of a Tunisian Jewish boxer, who became the World Flyweight Champion in 1931 and 1932. Perez started training as a boxer at age 14 along with his older brother Benjamin "Kid" Perez and rose to great fame thanks to the help and guidance of Leon Bellier. Moreover, he had a love affair with French-Italian actress Mireille Balin. The 5'1", 110-pound Perez won the International Boxing Union's version of the World Flyweight crown by a 2nd-round knockout of US-American champion Frankie Genaro, subsequently becoming the youngest world champion in boxing history. Perez got arrested in Paris on September 21, 1943 and was detained in the Drancy internment camp France, before being transported to the German extermination camp in Auschwitz where he was assigned to the Monowitz subcamp to serve as a slave laborer. Victor Perez arrived at Auschwitz on October 10, 1943, as part of "Transport 60" a group of 1,000. He was held in AuschwitzIII/Monowitz. While there he was forced to fight in boxing matches for the amusement of the SS command. By 1945 Victor had survived 140 bouts in 15 months. Perez was one of the prisoners on the death march that left the camp on January 18, 1945.

== Cast ==
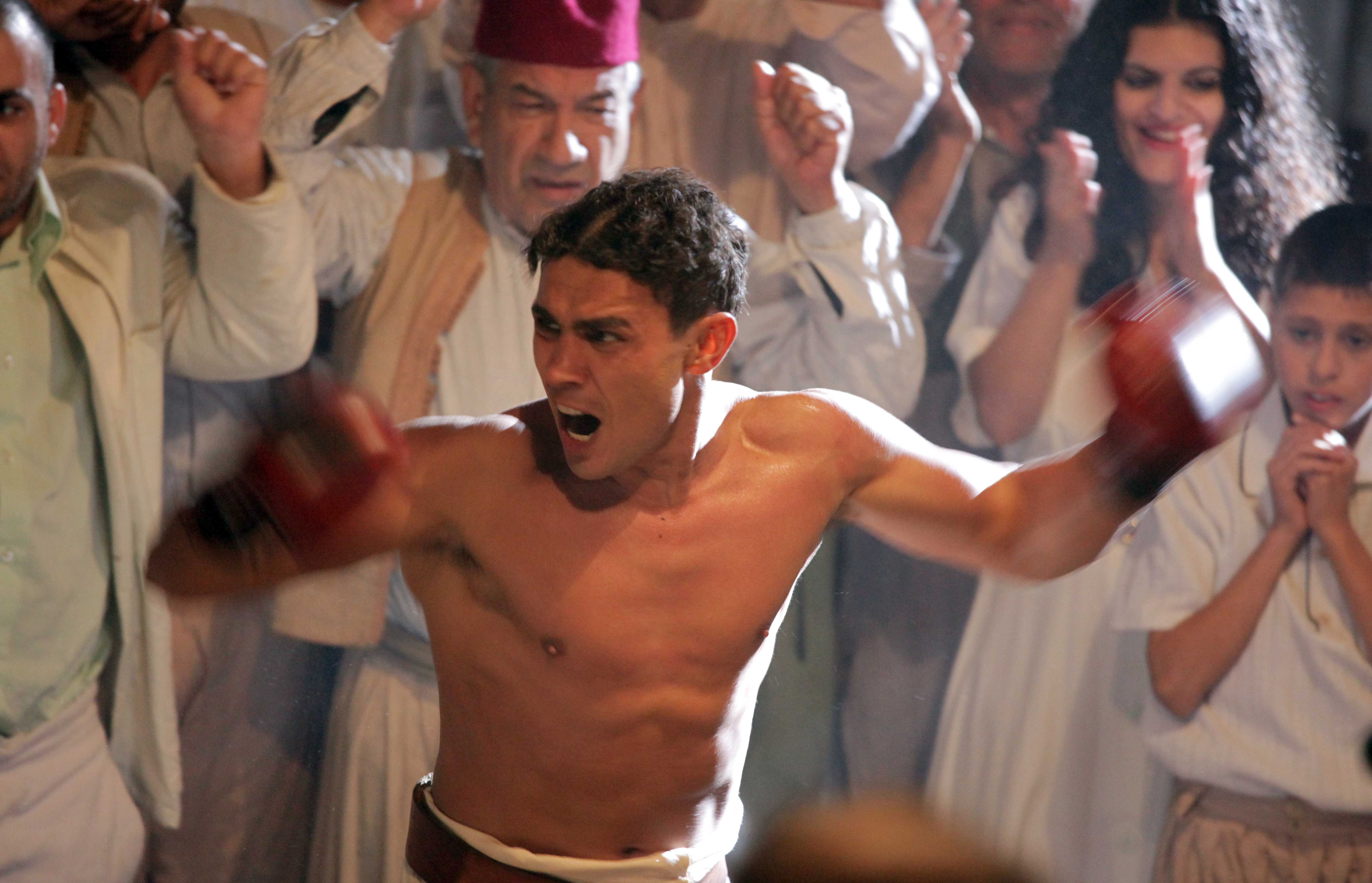
Brahim Asloum in Victor Young Perez

- Brahim Asloum as Victor 'Young' Perez
- Isabella Orsini as Mireille Balin
- Bruce Payne as Commandant Heinrich Schwarz
- Steve Suissa as Benjamin Perez
- Denis Sandler as German boxing promoter
- Alaa Safi as Battling Mokhtar
- Olivier Sa as Frankie Genaro
- Sava Dragunchev as presenter

== Release and reception ==
The film was released in France on 20 November 2013. According to film critic Virgil Dumez, 'despite obvious stylistic blunders, Victor Young Perez takes the viewer through the evocative power of its history and therefore wins by KO after an unequal battle, but pretty exciting'. Dennis Harvey stated that the film was 'enjoyable if unmemorable, so long as it portrays the life of its titular figure' but turned 'heavy-handed, however, when dealing with his death' as the tragic tale is blunted by the stereotypical 'portrayal of sneering Nazi sadism'. Jordan Mintzer stated that 'while many filmmakers would find tragedy in the simple fact that Perez wound up in a death camp, the director piles on the schmaltz here in one ill-advised scene after another, leading to a gruesome, final brawl with a beefy German that turns the horrors of Auschwitz into a spectacle worthy of Rocky IV'. A different reviewer stated that the film contains 'an impressive story that in the hands of debutant Ouaniche has unfortunately turned into a half-hearted melodrama that is almost exclusively populated by uninteresting stereotypes'. Noémie Luciani stated that 'the too numerous, too clumsy dialogues tend to turn against the film'. In contrast, Yvonne Kozlovsky Golan stated that the film highlighted the 'WWII experience of North African Jewry' in a 'clear and understandable, emotionally and consciously accessible manner'.

=== Home media ===
In the United Kingdom, it was 2016's best-selling foreign language film on home video, above Hong Kong action film Ip Man 3 in second place.

== Awards and honors ==
2013

São Paulo International Film Festival.
Nominated 'Best Feature Film' Category

2014

Santa Barbara International Film Festival
Nominated 'Best International Feature' Category
