= Fansville =

Advertising campaign for Dr Pepper

- Promotional image from 2021
- Client: Dr Pepper
- Market: United States
- Product: Soft drink
- Release date: 2018–present
- Directed by: Jonathan Krisel
- Starring: Brian Bosworth Eddie George Kate French

Fansville is an episodic advertising campaign for carbonated soft drink company Dr Pepper that debuted in 2018. The campaign is presented in a series of 30-second television commercials that depict the titular "Fansville", a fictional town that revolves around college football and the consumption of Dr Pepper. Each installment depicts various citizens of Fansville and exaggerated dilemmas they face in their college football fandom. The television campaign has also been supplemented with online advertising, social media marketing, and radio advertising.

After its initial run during the 2018 college football season, the campaign has been renewed for multiple seasons. Fansville has included several prominent college football people in recurring roles, including former Oklahoma Sooners linebacker Brian Bosworth as the town sheriff and former Ohio State Buckeyes running back Eddie George as a doctor. Following the introduction of name, image, and likeness rights to college football in 2021, Dr Pepper began to feature active collegiate players, first with Clemson Tigers quarterback DJ Uiagalelei that year and later with Alabama Crimson Tide quarterback Bryce Young in 2022.

== Background ==
Fansville is depicted as a small American town whose citizens have an exaggerated affinity for college football. Fansville residents share a strong allegiance to the generically-named "State" and a hatred for the rivaling "Tech", a play on the common monikers for state universities and technological universities. Former Oklahoma Sooners linebacker Brian Bosworth portrays the Sheriff, a recurring character that is naive and often in the middle of various town dilemmas. Former Ohio State Buckeyes running back Eddie George stars as the town doctor, conducting all his work while wearing a beer helmet. Les Miles portrayed a convenience store clerk in the series.

== History ==
Just before the start of the 2018 season, Dr Pepper announced the retiring of its "Larry Culpepper" character, a fictional concession worker portrayed by James M. Connor that had starred in Dr Pepper's college football advertising since 2014. In a statement, the company stated its desire to take its advertising in a "new creative direction", simultaneously announcing the new Fansville series. The first Fansville commercial was aired on August 27, 2018.

In 2021, name, image, and likeness rights were introduced for National Collegiate Athletic Association (NCAA) student athletes, allowing them to profit off their likeness for the first time. As a result, Dr Pepper began to recruit active collegiate players to star in their commercials. The first college athlete to be signed to the advertising campaign was Clemson Tigers quarterback DJ Uiagalelei during the 2021 season. In 2022, the company tapped Alabama Crimson Tide quarterback Bryce Young to star as himself in the Fansville commercials.

In 2024, for the seventh season of the Fansville series, Dr Pepper debuted an ad spot featuring satirical references to the Michigan Wolverines sign-stealing scandal and the EA Sports College Football 25 video game. Texas Longhorns quarterback Quinn Ewers also debuted in the commercial, portraying a sheriff's deputy.
