= Ruslan Pimenov =

Russian footballer

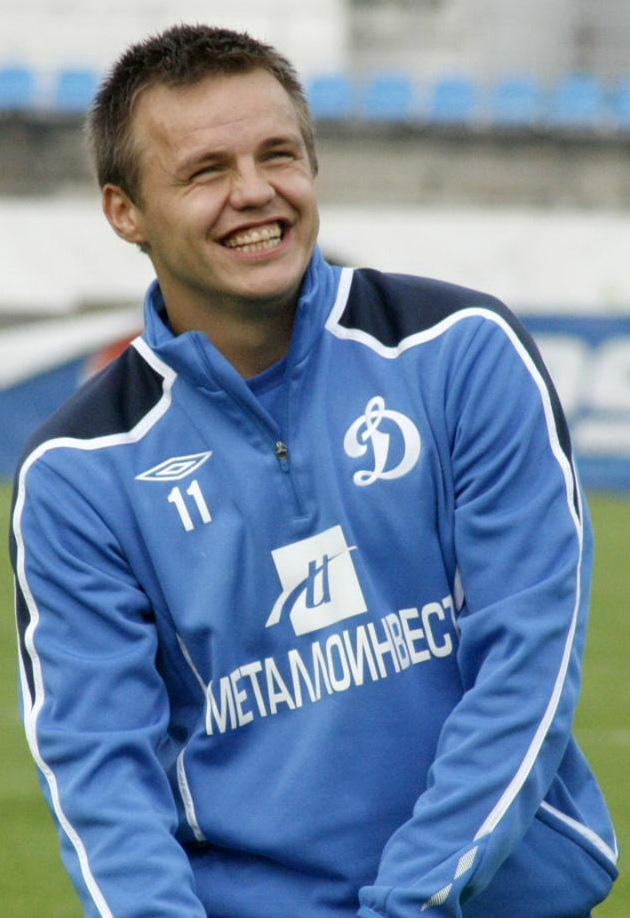
- Pimenov in 2007

Personal information
- Full name: Ruslan Valeryevich Pimenov
- Date of birth: 25 November 1981 (age 44)
- Place of birth: Moscow, Soviet Union
- Height: 1.76 m (5 ft 9 1/2 in)
- Position: Forward

Youth career
- 1997–1998: Torpedo Moscow

Senior career*
Years	Team	Apps	(Gls)
1998	Torpedo-ZIL Moscow	0	(0)
1999–2006	Lokomotiv Moscow	86	(17)
2005	→ Metz (loan)	3	(0)
2005	→ Alania Vladikavkaz (loan)	6	(0)
2006	→ Metz (loan)	7	(0)
2007–2009	Dynamo Moscow	23	(5)
2010	Dinamo Minsk	4	(0)

International career
2000–2003	Russia U21	12	(4)
2001–2002	Russia	4	(0)
- * Club domestic league appearances and goals

Ruslan Valeryevich Pimenov (Russian: Руслан Валерьевич Пименов; born 25 November 1981) is a Russian former footballer.

== Career ==
He played mostly for Lokomotiv Moscow and then briefly for Alania Vladikavkaz. In 2005–2006 he played for FC Metz in France. In 2007, he transferred to Dynamo Moscow. However, Andrei Kobelev soon forbade Pimenov even to train with the team as the footballer lacked for fitness. Pimenov was released from his contract only in December 2009.

He played four matches for Russia in 2002, including two at the 2002 FIFA World Cup.

== Honours ==
- Russian Premier League champion in 2002 and 2004
- Russian Cup winner in 2000 and 2001
- Russian Super Cup winner in 2003

== Personal life ==
Ruslan was married to Glikeriya Shirokova. They first met at Lokomotiv Moscow where Glikeriya was working as a staff member. They have one daughter together, Kristina Pimenova, who is a well-known child model. Kristina has an older half-sister, Natalia, Glikeriya's eldest child.
