= Kris Deedigan =

British actor

- Born: Kris Deedigan; 1979 (age 46–47); Alnwick, Northumberland, England
- Occupation: Actor
- Years active: 2001–present

Kris Deedigan is a British actor best known for his portrayal of Des Townsend in the long-running Channel 4 soap opera Hollyoaks.

== Career ==
Deedigan's first main role was playing Des in soap opera, Hollyoaks which he began filming in 2009. In 2010 his character was axed from the series after producer Paul Marquess conducted a cast cull. Deedigan also contributed to Hollyoak's charity single, 'Sing for England' which is released in 2010.

Deedigan also starred in an episode of Coronation Street as the man who knocked over Sophie. In 2018, Deedigan was the video projectionist for the theatre production “Under Milk Wood”. He did the same in 2017 for tithe production of “A Song For Ella Grey”. Deedigan is the founder & artistic director of MyLifeProductions, a filming studio based in the UK, which he started at 23 years old. Deedigan has been mentoring young upcoming filmmakers in the UK, including Alnwick based filmmaker Brad Hedley, who won an award for his short film ‘The Importance of Acquiescence’ at the Royal Television Society awards in 2022. In 2023, Deedigan participated in the great north run alongside North East Youth. The money he raised was used to support young homeless people in the North East.

In 2016, it was announced that Deedigan had teamed up with fellow filmmaker Lewis Murray to direct and co-write an un-broadcast TV pilot for "First Class", a postman comedy series loosely based on his father's exploits as a postman in Alnwick. Filming took place around Alnwick over the Easter period and was sent out to industry contacts in the hope of making it a full TV show. The pilot was not progressed and a full series was not commissioned.

== Filmography ==
Year	Title	Character	Notes
2004	Everything	Punter	(uncredited)
2006	Dogtown (TV series)	Lad	1. Episode
2006	Emmerdale	Mark Delaware	5. Episodes
2009-2010	Hollyoaks	Des Townsend	61. Episodes
2011	Doctors (TV series)	Jason Cavanagh	1. Episode
2012	Coronation Street (TV series)	Driver	2. Episodes
2012	The Sicilian Man	Dave Brown	Short
2015	Inspector George Gently (TV series)	Uniformed Sergeant	1. Episode
2021	Give Them Wings	Brian Little	
2023	We’re Better Together	Chris Baker	Short
2025	28 Years Later	Guy	(uncredited)
