= Kristina Pimenova =

Russian fashion model (born 2005)

- Кристина Пименова
- Pimenova in 2019
- Born: 27 December 2005 (age 20); Moscow, Russia
- Occupation: Fashion model
- Father: Ruslan Pimenov
- Modeling information
- Hair color: Brown
- Eye color: Blue

Kristina Ruslanovna Pimenova (Russian: Кристина Руслановна Пименова; born 27 December 2005) is a Russian fashion model.

== Life and career ==
Pimenova's parents are former footballer Ruslan Pimenov and former model Glikeriya Shirokova. Pimenova has an elder sister, Natalia. Kristina Pimenova spent the first few months of her life in France where her father played football for FC Metz. Pimenova started working as a child model before her fourth birthday, after her mother sent photographs to the agency President Kids. Pimenova has worked for brands including Armani, Benetton, Burberry, and Roberto Cavalli.

In 2014, Women Daily magazine called her "the most beautiful girl in the world".

In Moscow, Pimenova practiced rhythmic gymnastics, under Olga Kapranova. In 2013, she competed in a gymnastics tournament in Tatarstan organized by Alina Kabaeva, winning a gold medal in her age group.

In April 2015, she appeared on the cover of Vogue Kids.

Later in 2015, Pimenova moved to California, USA with her mother. A documentary about Pimenova aired on RTL Television in October 2016.

=== Acting ===
Kristina Pimenova in Michigan, set of The Russian Bride

Pimenova played a post-production part as a singing child in the Italian fantasy film Creators: The Past. In an interview for Posh Kids Magazine, she expressed her wish to become a professional actress and film director. She was subsequently cast for the role of Dasha in Michael S. Ojeda's horror thriller The Russian Bride, co-starring with Corbin Bernsen and Oksana Orlan.

== Criticism ==
When Pimenova's mother managed her social media accounts, there was some criticism of the content as an example of sexualisation of an under-age model. Her mother disagreed, maintaining that all the photos were perfectly innocent and "you must think like a pedophile in order to see something sexual in these pictures".

== Filmography ==
Title	Year	Role	Director	Notes
Creators: The Past	2019	Singing child	Piergiuseppe Zaia	
The Russian Bride	2018	Dasha	Michael S. Ojeda	
