= Bruce Payne =

English actor and producer (born 1958)

- Born: Bruce Martyn Payne; 22 November 1958 (age 68); Addlestone, Surrey, England
- Education: Royal Academy of Dramatic Art
- Occupations: Actor, producer, screenwriter, film director, Theatre director
- Years active: 1981–present

Bruce Martyn Payne (born 22 November 1958) is an English actor, producer, screenwriter, film director and theatre director. Payne is best known for portraying villains, such as Charles Rane in Passenger 57, Jacob Kell in Highlander: Endgame, and Damodar in Dungeons & Dragons and Dungeons & Dragons 2: Wrath of the Dragon God.

Payne trained at RADA, the Royal Academy of Dramatic Art in London and was identified, in the late 1980s, with the "Brit Pack" of rising young British actors.

== Early life ==
Payne developed an interest for acting at an early age. In an interview with Impact (magazine) in 2001, Payne claimed that a crocodile from the play Peter Pan shouted that it would eat his brother and then proceeded to run upstage.

At the age of 14, he was diagnosed with a slight form of spina bifida, which by age 16 required surgery to rectify. Payne was hospitalised for 6 months following the operation. Payne continued school studies, despite a contact with a talent scout during that time. After his graduation, he enrolled in the National Youth Theatre for two seasons. Payne has described this experience as "Four hundred kids thrown together to work on 7 plays." In addition, he played a lead role for the National Student Theatre Company at the Edinburgh Festival Fringe for one season in 1979. He then auditioned for several fringe acting companies, but was told he was too young and lacked experience. Nonetheless, that year saw him admitted to the "prestigious" RADA acting programme. Before being accepted at RADA, Payne had worked as a joiner, a salesman, and a landscape gardener. Payne graduated from RADA in 1981 with seven major prizes for acting, comedy and physical presence.

Payne was part of a 'new wave' of actors to emerge from the academy. Others included Jonathan Pryce, Juliet Stevenson, Alan Rickman, Anton Lesser, Kenneth Branagh, and Fiona Shaw. In 1980 the Principal of RADA, Hugh Cruttwell, selected a scene from an adaptation of William Shakespeare's Macbeth, which Payne co-wrote with Paul McGann, to be performed in front of Queen Elizabeth II, in one of her rare visits to the academy. Payne directed the scene in which he and McGann acted. Payne played Macbeth and wielded a baseball bat on stage instead of a sword. Kenneth Branagh performed a soliloquy from Hamlet at the same event.

== Acting career ==
=== 1980s ===
Payne's first television role was in the Tales Out of School series. Payne played an abusive PE teacher who "comes across as more head bully than responsible adult during his classes". His first major film role came in Privates on Parade in which he played the singing and dancing Flight Sergeant Kevin Cartwright (which role he had already played in the stage version).

In 1983, he appeared in Michael Mann's horror film The Keep as an unnamed border guard. That same year, Steven Berkoff cast him in his production of West at the Donmar Warehouse. Payne played Les, a member of an East End gang intent on gaining revenge against the rival Hoxton Mob for the slaying of one of their number. Richard Corliss of TIME stated that Payne bestowed "a frighteningly dynamic performance" in the play.

In 1985, Payne was cast as a "committed", "butch snooker manager" known as "The One" (also known as "T.O.") in director Alan Clarke's snooker musical Billy the Kid and the Green Baize Vampire. Michael Brooke stated that Payne gave the "stand-out performance" in the film. and MS London stated that Payne "is a charismatic presence, with a capable voice, who is perfectly cast as The One".

In 1986, both Payne and Berkoff appeared in Julien Temple's musical Absolute Beginners. Payne played a psychotic "pompous and pathetic racist" named Flikker, who participated in the 1958 Notting Hill race riots. One reviewer argued that Payne was "the only actor to walk off Absolute Beginners with his reputation not only intact but enhanced" and that his portrayal of Flikker "was a headbutt of reality in a fantasmagoria of overkill." One critic stated that Payne gave a "meaty, saving-grace performance" in the film. Film journalist and editor Ann Lloyd selected Payne as the most promising newcomer of 1987 for his role in the film. In the same year Payne appeared in the film Solarbabies along with fellow British performer Alexei Sayle as filthy bounty hunters named Dogger and Malice. Payne said of his and Sayle's performances in Vogue that "the old image of an English arch-villain – Boris Karloff, that sort of thing, is turned upside down. We're just a couple of soaks".

In 1988, Payne appeared as Eddy in the Steven Berkoff-directed play, Greek (a retelling of Sophocles' Oedipus Rex), at the Wyndham's Theatre. Martin Hoyle, writing for The Independent, stated that Payne's "Eddy is vital, intelligent and physically disciplined in the best Berkoff style". Charles Osbourne, writing for The Daily Telegraph, stated that Payne brought "a cheerful zest to the role of Eddy".

A reviewer for The Listener stated that Payne "impresses throughout" the play. Another reviewer stated that "Payne gives a powerful performance as Eddy, the crusader out to defeat the horror of society" only "to find that he is part of the horror".

In 1989, he was cast in For Queen and Country as a "drug kingpin". named Colin.

Payne and other young British actors who were becoming established film actors, such as Tim Roth, Gary Oldman, Colin Firth, and Paul McGann, were dubbed the "Brit Pack". Payne's performances endeared him to Warner Bros., who considered "Bruce Payne as Bruce Wayne" on their "one liner" press marketing PR campaign for the first of Tim Burton's Batman films. Ultimately, Michael Keaton got the role. Payne has commented, "Warner were fascinated by the similarity" between his name and that of Bruce Wayne. Payne has said that "they drew up a very short shortlist and there I was on it. Obviously, I lost out in the end to Michael Keaton."

That same year Payne appeared as Doctor Burton in the dramatic film Silence Like Glass. The film was nominated for Outstanding Feature Film at the German Film Awards.

=== 1990s ===
In 1990 Payne appeared in the music video for Neil Young's song "Over and Over", directed by Julien Temple, as a Stanley Kowalski-esque character.

In 1991, Payne was cast as the Devil in Switch. Payne was described as a "delightfully wicked Satan" by Film Review. The Providence Journal described him as a "slick devil".

In 1992, Payne was cast in his best-known role, opposite Wesley Snipes, as a "notorious terrorist and hijacker", with a steely, demonic nerve, named Charles Rane, in Passenger 57. Marcus Trower of Empire stated that Payne was "a brilliantly disconcerting madman. With his flowing blond Jesus locks, armour-piercing stare and casual sadism, he makes Hannibal Lecter look like a social worker – and like Anthony Hopkins' serial killer, part of the man's menace is in the apparent contradiction between his articulate, well-spoken English and his off-hand brutality." The Radio Times stated that Payne and Snipes both gave "charismatic turns" in the film. The New York Times stated that Payne brought "a tongue-in-cheek humor to the psychopathic fiend". A reviewer for People magazine stated that "Bruce Payne steals the plane—and the movie". In an article for the Waterloo Region Record, Jamie Portman described Payne as a "suave and cultivated English actor" playing "a suave and cultivated killer named Charles Rane" and suggested that a "key reason director Kevin Hooks chose him for the role was that he wanted a villain with as much magnetism as the hero". Payne was described as "icily perfect as the villainous Rane" in the Worcester Telegram & Gazette. Julius Marshall stated that Payne was "ideal for his role: charming, dangerous – the kind of evil genius you love to hate". The Star Tribune stated that "Bruce Payne makes a splendid psychopath, consistently stealing scenes from the likes of Wesley Snipes and Elizabeth Hurley throughout Passenger 57".

In 1993, Payne played a "charismatic" werewolf named Adam Garou in Full Eclipse. Joseph Savitski, who reviewed the film for Beyond Hollywood, stated, "Payne is masterful as Detective Garou, a seductive and evil villain with arrogance and confidence to spare. When he's on screen, Payne demands the attention of the audience, and you're hard pressed to resist his performance. Payne is also the perfect adversary, the kind you're supposed to hate, but who has the charisma to draw you in nonetheless".

In 1995, Payne played a "rogue FBI agent" named Karl Savak in director Kurt Wimmer's One Tough Bastard. One reviewer described Savak as "one of the most entertaining movie villains in low budget action flick history" and noted that "so awesome is Karl Savak that some lunatic has created a Facebook page in his honor". Another reviewer stated that "Bruce Payne, with his Whitesnake hair and nose ring is slimeball perfection as the villain". In 1998, he played Jurgen, a first-class and charismatic operative in season two of La Femme Nikita.

=== 2000s ===
In 2000, Payne portrayed the villain Jacob Kell in Highlander: Endgame (2000), the third sequel to the original Highlander film. One reviewer said of Highlander: Endgame, "the one in the cast that seems to be having the most fun is Bruce Payne. Traditionally, Highlander villains give performances that go completely over-the-top and well into the stratosphere. Payne contrarily gives a performance where he enunciates every syllable with relish and dramatic weight, resulting in a performance that is entirely captivating whenever he is on screen."

Salon.com's reviewer wrote that "[Payne] playing Kell as a cockney thug with triple crucifixes embedded in the heels of his Doc Martens, Payne is more fun than either of the stars". A reviewer for Trash City stated that "Endgame is pretty good, largely thanks to Bruce Payne's efforts as the bad guy, who is right up there with Clancy Brown's original decapitator", the Kurgan. Marke Andrews, writing for The Vancouver Sun, stated that Payne provided the "focal point" in the film and that he dived "into his role with gusto". Andrews also stated that Payne's 'facial expressions rival Jim Carrey's in The Mask'. Cherriece Wright, who reviewed the film for The Dispatch, stated that it contained "brilliant performances by Christopher Lambert and Bruce Payne". Wright stated that Payne "delivers a great performance as Jacob Kell blending smoothly the malicious vindictiveness of the embittered immortal with a sarcastic wit that provides needed humor".

In the same year, Payne played Damodar in Dungeons & Dragons, henchman of the malevolent Profion (played by Jeremy Irons). Although the film was critically panned, Payne's performance was reviewed favourably. One reviewer said that "Bruce Payne (Damodar) as Profion's nefarious assistant in his power-hungry schemes was the stand-out performance of all the actors in the film. Payne has a true lock on how to play a character that is menacing even without any show of power. His portrayal of Damodar calls to mind Doug Bradley's portrayal of Pinhead in the Hellraiser films, so coldly, coolly arrogant and confident is his character. Above and beyond the grade I give to this film, Payne has earned himself an A+ in my gradebook." Another reviewer stated that Payne's performance proved that he is "one of Hollywood's more reliable villains".

Branden Chowen, who reviewed the film for Indie Pulse, stated that "the standout in the film is the man who returns for the sequel: Bruce Payne. His character is written to be one-note throughout, but Payne still manages to create an excellent villain. Once the audience gets past his blue lipstick, which is no small feat, Payne is a formidable and passionate force". The Charlotte Observer stated that "menacing Bruce Payne gives the film's one potent performance". Abbie Bernstein for Audio Video Revolution declared that Payne was "enjoyably evil as the secondary baddie in charge of capturing the rebels"

In 2004, Payne appeared as the "snarling" Neighbour, who "dabbles" in producing kinky virtual games in the dystopian horror mystery Paranoia 1.0. The film was nominated in the best film category at the Sitges - Catalan International Film Festival and at the Sundance Film Festival, and won the best film award at the Malaga International Week of Fantastic Cinema. John Fallon stated that as the Neighbour, Payne "laid on the charisma and the macho-ness thick".

In 2005, Payne returned to the role of Damodar in Dungeons & Dragons: Wrath of the Dragon God. Payne was the only member of the original cast in the sequel.

In 2006, he helped to launch the National Youth Theatre's 50th-anniversary programme along with Sir Ian McKellen, Timothy Spall, Diana Quick, Paula Wilcox, Jonathan Wrather, newsreader Krishnan Guru-Murthy, and Little Britain's Matt Lucas and David Walliams.

=== 2010s ===
In 2011, Payne appeared in the horror film Prowl as a "blatantly untrustworthy" "hillbilly truck driver" named Bernard. Matt Withers, who reviewed the film for JoBlo.com, stated that "Bruce Payne shows up as a trucker in a throwaway role that he makes anything but". Payne also appeared in Carmen's Kiss (an adaptation of the Georges Bizet opera Carmen).

In 2012, Payne voiced a demon in the found-footage horror film Greystone Park (also known as The Asylum Tapes).

In 2013, Payne appeared in the Warner Bros. action film Getaway. Payne also appeared in the action film Vendetta as a sinister Whitehall mandarin named Mr. Rooker. One reviewer of the film gave it eight out of ten and stated that Payne "nearly steals the movie with a plum role as the icy head of British black ops". In addition, Payne portrayed Auschwitz camp commandant Rudolf Hoess n a "superciliously evil" manner, in the French film Victor Young Perez, which concerns the life of the Tunisian Jew flyweight boxer Victor Perez.

In 2015, Payne played Winston, a religious fanatic, in the horror film Re-Kill.

In 2018 Payne appeared in the anthology film London Unplugged, which premiered at the East End Film Festival.

In 2019 Payne was nominated in the category of Best Actor in a Feature Film at the FANtastic Horror Film Festival in San Diego, for his performance as Jacob in the horror film Acid Pit Stop.

=== 2020s ===
Payne played the main antagonist in Creators: The Past (which he also produced and acted as assistant director for), which was released in 2020 in Italy.

In 2021 Payne gave a "brief but stunning turn as Damien, the arch bad guy" in British gangster thriller Nemesis. Carl Marsh stated that one scene in the film with Payne's character (Damien Osborne) and Billy Murray's character (John Morgan) reminded him of Robert De Niro and Al Pacino meeting in the Michael Mann film Heat and "was masterful". Chris Gelderd stated that "Payne is the perfect intimidating big-boss going up against Murray's cool and care-free kingpin". Payne appeared in the sequel of the Finnish superhero film, Rendel 2: Cycle of Revenge.

== Filmography ==
=== Film ===
As actor
Year	Title	Role	Director	Notes
1982	Privates on Parade	Flight Sergeant Kevin Cartwright	Michael Blakemore	Based on the Peter Nichols play Privates on Parade
1983	The Keep	Border Guard #2	Michael Mann	Based on F. Paul Wilson's 1981 novel The Keep
1984	Oxford Blues	Peter Howles	Robert Boris	A remake of the 1938 film A Yank at Oxford
1985	Billy the Kid and the Green Baize Vampire	T.O. (The One)	Alan Clarke	Loosely based on the rivalry between the snooker players Ray Reardon and Jimmy White
1986	Absolute Beginners	Flikker	Julien Temple	Based on Colin MacInnes 1959 novel Absolute Beginners
1986	Smart Money	Lawrance MacNiece	Bernard Rose	
1986	Solarbabies	Dogger	Alan Johnson	
1986	Caprice	Jacko / Edwina LaPage	Joanna Hogg	Short Film
1988	The Fruit Machine or Wonderland	Echo	Philip Saville	Payne does not speak a word of dialogue as the film's primary antagonist
1989	For Queen and Country	Colin	Martin Stellman	
1989	Silence Like Glass or Zwei Frauen	Doctor Burton	Carl Schenkel	
1991	Pyrates	Liam	Noah Stern	
1991	Howling VI: The Freaks	R.B Harker	Hope Perello	Loosely based on The Howling novels by Gary Brandner
1991	Switch	The Devil	Blake Edwards	Based on George Axelrod's play Goodbye Charlie
1992	Passenger 57	Charles Rane	Kevin Hooks	
1993	Full Eclipse	Adam Garou	Anthony Hickox	
1993	Necronomicon	Edward De Lapoer	Christophe Gans	Part 1 The Drowned. Loosely based on H. P. Lovecraft's short story The Rats in the Walls
1994	The Cisco Kid	General Martin Dupre	Luis Valdez	Based on the character created by O. Henry in his 1907 short story The Caballero's Way
1995	One Tough Bastard or One Man's Justice	Karl Savak	Kurt Wimmer	
1995	Aurora: Operation Intercept	Gordon Pruett	Paul Levine	
1996	Kounterfeit	Frankie	John Mallory Asher	
1997	No Contest II or Face the Evil	Jack Terry	Paul Lynch	
1997	Ravager	Cooper Wayne	James D. Deck	
1999	Sweepers	Doctor Cecil Hopper	Keoni Waxman	
1999	Warlock III: The End of Innocence	The Warlock / Phillip Covington	Eric Freiser	
2000	Highlander: Endgame	Jacob Kell	Doug Aarniokoski	Based on characters created by Gregory Widen
2000	Dungeons & Dragons	Damodar	Courtney Solomon	Based on the Dungeons & Dragons role-playing game
2001	Never Say Never Mind: The Swedish Bikini Team	Mr. Blue	Frederick Feitshans IV	A spoof of the James Bond films
2001	Ripper	Marshall Kane	John Eyres	
2002	Steal or Riders	Lieutenant Macgruder	Gerard Pires	
2003	Newton's Law	Dad	Pete Antico	Short Film
2003	Hellborn or Asylum of the Damned	Dr. McCort	Philip J. Jones	
2004	Paranoia 1.0 or One Point O	The Neighbour	Jeff Renfroe and Marteinn Thorsson	
2005	Dungeons & Dragons: Wrath of the Dragon God	Damodar	Gerry Lively	Based on the Dungeons & Dragons role-playing game
2007	Messages	Doctor Robert Golding	David Fairman	
2008	Brothel	Thief/Death	Amy Waddell	
2010	Dance Star	Harry	Steven M. Smith	Short film
2011	Prowl	Bernard	Patrik Syversen	
2011	Carmen's Kiss	Michael	David Fairman	An adaptation of the Georges Bizet opera Carmen
2012	Greystone Park or The Asylum Tapes	Demon	Sean Stone	Voice role
2013	Getaway	Distinguished Man	Courtney Solomon	
2013	Vendetta	Mr Rooker	Stephen Reynolds	
2013	Victor Young Perez	Rudolf Hoess	Jacques Ouaniche	Based on the life of Victor Perez
2014	Tales of the Supernatural	Father Doyle	Steven M. Smith	
2014	Final Command	Kane	Ross Peacock	Short film
2014	Asylum	Lieutenant Sharp	Todor Chapkanov	
2015	Age of Kill	Prime Minister James Newmont	Neil Jones	
2015	Re-Kill	Winston	Valeri Milev	
2015	The Antwerp Dolls	Ray Ferrino	Jake Reid	
2015	Ripper	Jack the Ripper	James Campbell	Short film
2016	Breakdown	Peter Grainger	Jonnie Malachi	
2016	Shopping	Nick	Layke Anderson	Short film
2016	In the Morning	James	Tom Kinnersly	Short film
2017	The Rizen	Admin	Matt Mitchell	
2018	London Unplugged	Nick	Layke Anderson	Anthology film
2019	Acid Pit Stop	Jacob	Jason Wright	Nominated- FANtastic Horror Film Festival Best Actor in a Feature Film
2020	Creators: The Past	Lord Kal	Piergiuseppe Zaia	
2021	Nemesis	Damien Osborne	James Crow	
2021	Election Night	Dominic Drummond	Neil Monaghan	
2021	Give Them Wings	Dr Markum	Sean Cronin	Based on the life of Paul Hodgson
2024	Rendel 2: Cycle of Revenge	Edward Cox	Jesse Haaja	
2024	The Stoic	Rhodes	Jonathan Eckersley	

As producer
Year	Title	Director	Notes
1997	Lowball	Demian Lichtenstein	
2018	The Boy Who Never Came Home: A True Story	Ranjeet S. Marwa	Documentary
2020	Creators: The Past	Piergiuseppe Zaia	
2021	Nemesis	James Crow	
2021	Karma Coma 2022		

As director/assistant director
Year	Title	Director	Notes
2020	Creators: The Past	Piergiuseppe Zaia	Assistant Director

As screenwriter
Year	Title	Director	Notes
2015	Re-Kill	Valeri Milev	Contributing writer
2015	The Antwerp Dolls	Ray Ferrino	Contributing writer
2016	Shopping	Layke Anderson	Contributing writer
2018	The Boy Who Never Came Home: A True Story	Ranjeet S. Marwa	Executive Story Editor
2020	Creators: The Past	Piergiuseppe Zaia	Story Supervisor
2020	A Little Boy's Diary	Ranjeet S. Marwa	Contributing Writer
2021	Karma Coma 2022		
2022	Mia (tra sogno e realtà)	Antonio Centomani	English Film Screenplay

=== TV appearances ===
As actor
Year	Title	Role	Notes
1982	Tales Out of School	Barratt	Episode: "Birth of a Nation"
1983	Keep it in the Family	Policeman	Episode: "A Moving Affair"
1984	West	Les	TV movie adaptation of Steven Berkoff's play
1984	The Bill	Adam March	Episode: "Clutching at Straws"
1984	Diana	Sergeant Grice	Episode 7
1984	The Brief	Sergeant Davis RMP	Episode: "People"
1985	Operation Julie	DC Malcolm Pollard	TV movie based on Dick Lee and Chris Pratt's nonfiction book Operation Julie: How the Undercover Police Team Smashed the World's Greatest Drugs Ring
1985	Oscar	Warder Martin	Episode: "De Profundis"
1987	Lost Belongings	Simon Hunt	Episodes: "The American Friend" and "Lenny Leaps In"
1987	The Bell-Run	Pace	TV movie
1987	Miss Marple	Michael Rafiel	Episode: "Nemesis", an adaptation of Agatha Christie's 1971 novel Nemesis
1988	The Equalizer	Greg Rivers	Episode: "Eighteen with a Bullet"
1989	Storyboard	Gerald	Episode: "Snakes and Ladders"
1990	Yellowthread Street	Nick Eden	Seven episodes, series based on the Yellowthread Street novels by William Leonard Marshall
1990	Bergerac	Jake	Episode: "The Messenger Boy"
1995	Tales from the Crypt	Sergeant Parker	Episode: "Comes the Dawn"
1998	La Femme Nikita	Jurgen	Episodes: "Approaching Zero", "Third Person", and "Spec Ops"
1999	Cleopatra	Cassius	TV movie adaptation of Margaret George's 1997 historical fiction novel The Memoirs of Cleopatra
2000	Britannic	Major Baker, MD	TV movie
2000	Apocalypse Revelation (aka San Giovanni – L'apocalisse)	Domitian	TV movie
2003	Dragnet	Alex Karp	Episode: "All That Glitters"
2003	Keen Eddie	Yellow	Episode: "Horse Heir"
2003	Spooks	Mickey Kaharias	Episode : "Smoke and Mirrors"
2004	Charmed	Leader of the Order	Episode: "Prince Charmed"
2017	Count Arthur Strong	Mr Duncan	Series 3 Episode: Arthur the Hat

=== Theatre ===
As actor
Year	Title	Role	Notes
1978	Julius Caesar	Julius Caesar	Directed by Michael Croft (Shaw Theatre); play by William Shakespeare
1979	The Tale of Randy Robin	Performer	Directed by John Godber (Cathedral Hall, Edinburgh); play by Michael Lawrence
1980	The Pillars of Society	Karsten Bernick	Directed by Glyn Idris Jones (RADA); play by Henrik Ibsen
1980	The Recruiting Officer	Captain Plume	Directed by Euan Smith (RADA); play by George Farquhar
1980	'Tis Pity She's a Whore	Vasques	Directed by Adrian Noble (RADA); play by John Ford
1980	Macbeth	Macbeth	Directed by Bruce Payne (RADA); play by William Shakespeare
1981	No Names, No Medals	SAS Soldier	Directed by Euan Smith (RADA); play by Euan Smith
1981	A Midsummer Night's Dream	Cobweb	Directed by Richard Digby Day (Nottingham Playhouse); play by William Shakespeare
1982	PIAF	Yves Montand	Directed by Jeremy Howe (York Theatre Royal); play by Pam Gems
1982	Privates on Parade	Flight sergeant Kevin Cartwright	Directed by Michael Blakemore (Derby Playhouse); play by Peter Nichols
1983	The Rocky Horror Picture Show	Frank-N-Furter	Directed by Christopher Dunham (Palace Theatre, Westcliff-on-Sea); play by Richard O'Brien
1983	West	Les	Directed by Steven Berkoff (Donmar Warehouse); play by Steven Berkoff
1984	Alice	The Inventor	Directed by Nicholas Hytner (Playhouse Theatre); a musical version of Lewis Carroll's 1865 novel Alice in Wonderland
1988	Greek	Eddy and Fortune-Teller	Directed by Steven Berkoff (Wyndhams Theatre); play by Steven Berkoff

As director
Year	Title	Notes
1980	Macbeth	Play by William Shakespeare
1993	Greek	Mark Taper Forum, Los Angeles; play by Steven Berkoff

=== Other media ===
Music videos

- Neil Young- Over and Over (1990) as a Stanley Kowalski esque character. Directed by Julien Temple.

Television advertisements

- NatWest (1983) as a punk youth.
- Budweiser Bud Ice (1995) as a sinister spokesman.
