= Sean Cronin (actor) =

English actor and director

- Born: 10 July 1964 (age 62); London, England
- Occupations: Actor, director
- Years active: 1999–present

Sean Cronin (born 1964) is an English actor and director. Cronin is best known for playing villains. He is of Italian and Spanish descent.

== Career ==
Cronin was vocalist for the gothic rock band The Marionettes, which formed in 1986 and toured with bands such as Pearl Jam and Nirvana The band released four albums between 1990 and 1998. In 1999, Cronin began his acting career playing a High Priest in The Mummy. He subsequently had small roles in The World Is Not Enough and Harry Potter and the Chamber of Secrets. In 2015 he played a villain in Mission: Impossible – Rogue Nation. He also appeared as Max, one of the villainous Ferrino brothers (along with Bruce Payne as Ray), in The Antwerp Dolls. In 2016 he played the eponymous villain in Kill Kane, opposite Vinnie Jones. He has also been cast in Fantastic Beasts and Where to Find Them, based on J. K. Rowling's novel Fantastic Beasts and Where to Find Them, and sequel of the Finnish superhero film, Rendel 2: Cycle of Revenge.

Cronin's first directorial film was Escape to Gossau, which he co-directed with Michael Koltes. Cronin subsequently directed Give Them Wings, which focuses on the life of disabled writer Paul Hodgson. He is also set to direct Michael, a biopic of boxer Michael Watson.

== Filmography ==
=== Film ===
As actor

Year	Title	Role	Director	Notes
1999	The Mummy	High Priest	Stephen Sommers	A loose remake of The Mummy
1999	Notting Hill	Walk on	Roger Michell	Written by Richard Curtis
1999	Star Wars: Episode I – The Phantom Menace	Coruscant Senate Guard	George Lucas	
1999	Elephant Juice	Bouncer	Sam Miller	
1999	The World Is Not Enough	Renard's Henchman	Michael Apted	Based on the James Bond character created by Ian Fleming
1999	The Escort	Fashion Designer	Michel Blanc	
1999	Sleepy Hollow	Prisoner	Tim Burton	Loosely based on Washington Irving's short story The Legend of Sleepy Hollow
2001	The Mummy Returns	High Priest	Stephen Sommers	
2001	The Last Minute	Fetish Freak	Stephen Norrington	
2002	Harry Potter and the Chamber of Secrets	Wizard	Chris Columbus	Based on J. K. Rowling's novel Harry Potter and the Chamber of Secrets
2008	Will to Power	Baseball Player 2	David Rountree	
2009	Arm Candy	Evil Russian	Eliza Schroeder	Short Film
2011	The Art of Thieving	Ace	Zali Mazli	Short Film
2011	Something Sinister Is Coming This Way	Drug Lord	Sam Proudfoot	Short Film
2012	Different Perspectives	Arms Dealer	Al Brenninkmeijer	
2012	The Thompsons	Cyrus	Mitchell Altieri and Phil Flores	
2012	The Seasoning House	Branimar	Paul Hyett	
2012	You Have Reached Your Destination	Turner	Bobby Field	Short Film
2012	The Knight's Cross	David	Tom Lancaster	Short Film
2012	The Ice Cream Wars	Wictor	Paul Tanter	
2013	The Callback Queen	'Arry	Graham Cantwell	
2013	The Knock	DCP Line Manager	Chris Greybe and Thom Greybe	Short Film
2013	Fare	Boyfriend	P.J. Harling	Short Film
2013	Escape to Gossau	SS-Brigadefürer Josef Heidenberg	Michael Koltes and Sean Cronin	Short Film
2014	Hackney's Finest	Delski	Chris Bouchard	
2014	London Hood	Alan	Sean Cronin	Short Film
2015	Hardoe Davinci: Pizzaz	Steak Knife	Benedict Cohen	Short Film
2015	Mission: Impossible – Rogue Nation	Masked Syndicate Man	Christopher McQuarrie	
2015	Hard Tide	Terry	Robert Osman and Nathanael Wiseman	
2015	The Antwerp Dolls	Max Ferrino	Jake Reid	
2015	Red Handed	Killer	Edward Andrews	Short Film
2016	Kill Kane	Kane Keegan	Adam Stephen Kelly	
2016	Retribution	Christian	Danny Albury and David Bispham	
2016	The Brother	Jacob	Ryan Bonder	
2016	Bogieville	Madison	Sean Cronin	
2016	Unattended Item	Andy	Filippos Vokotopoulos	Short Film
2016	Fantastic Beasts and Where to Find Them	Criminal	David Yates	Based on J. K. Rowling's novel Fantastic Beasts and Where to Find Them
2016	Revolution: New Art for a New World	Sergeant Berman	Margy Kinmonth	
2016	Eliminators	Big Boss Man	James Nunn	
2016	Apocalypse	Kidnapper	Tony Jopia	
2017	We Still Steal the Old Way	CPO Quinn	Sacha Bennett	
2017	The Dark Return of Time	Handley	Sean Cronin	Based on R.B. Russell's novel The Dark Return of Time
2017	Welcome to Curiosity	Nikolai	Ben Pickering	
2017	Witch	Dennis Vincent	Trevor Hayward	
2017	Legend of Dark Rider	Stefan	Titus Paar	
2017	Reapers Shadow	Daniel Archer	Charles Huddlestone	
2017	Made Ordinary	Carl/ Dr Devastation	Christian Kotey	
2018	Deathfall	Val	Paul T.T. Easter	
2022	Rendel 2: Cycle of Revenge	Smiley	Jesse Haaja	
2022	Give Them Wings	Daniel	Sean Cronin	
2023	Wrath of Dracula	Count Dracula	Steve Lawson	
2023	Escape	Andras	Howard J. Ford	
2024	SkullHunter	Fandango	Charles Solly and James Solly	

As Director

Year	Title	Notes
2013	Escape to Gossau	Short Film. Co-director.
2014	London Hood	Short Film.
2015	Unborn Justice	Short Film.
2015	An Unfortunate Woman	Short Film.
2018	Eleven	
2022	Give Them Wings	
2022	Michael-The Michael Watson Story	Pre-production
2023	Our Kid	
2024	Bogieville	
2024	Drained	

=== Music Videos ===
Year	Title	Artist
2021	"Long Time Friends"	The Living Tombstone

=== TV appearances ===
As actor

Year	Title	Role	Notes
1999	Cleopatra	High Priest	TV movie. An adaptation of Margaret George's 1997 historical fiction novel The Memoirs of Cleopatra.
1999	Jonathan Creek	Party Guest	Episode: The Omega Man
2000	The 10th Kingdom	Prison Officer	Episode 1
2000	Lock, Stock...	Mr Skin	Episode: ...And Four Stolen Hooves
2000	McCready and Daughter	Gangster	TV movie
2014	The Gigolo Origins	Blitz	TV movie

As director

Year	Title	Notes
2014	The Wolds	TV movie.
2017	The Verse	TV movie.
