= Brit Pack =

Young English actors who have achieved success in Hollywood

"Brit Pack" is a term that has been used to refer to specific groups of young British actors who have achieved success in Hollywood, as well as more generally to the entire group of such actors. According to TalkTalk, "every decade brings a new Brit Pack, another disparate group of actors backed by the media to achieve simultaneous Hollywood stardom." However, the term is most closely associated with the crop of English actors that emerged in the late 1980s, because of the prominence of the American Brat Pack actors at that time.

== History ==
In November 1986, journalist Elissa Van Poznak conducted an interview with Colin Firth, Spencer Leigh, Paul McGann, Bruce Payne, and Tim Roth for the January 1987 edition of The Face. Daniel Day-Lewis and Gary Oldman were also invited, but were unable to attend due to acting obligations (although Oldman gave his own interview at a later date). The title of the article was "The Brit Pack": this moniker stuck and has been referenced in subsequent pieces regarding actors from that period. In the February 1988 issue of Film Comment, Harlan Kennedy stated that Day-Lewis and Oldman, along with Rupert Everett and Miranda Richardson, were the "pack-leaders". According to a 2011 retrospective article by Marlow Stern in The Daily Beast, the British press anointed Oldman "de facto ringleader" of the Brit Pack.

Unlike the Brat Pack or other similarly defined groups of American actors, Brit Pack actors rarely associated with each other socially or in film. Harlan Kennedy wrote that the group "aren't seen together at parties or in restaurants or in gossip columns. And since British cinema has had no equivalent to Hollywood's Eighties conveyor-belt youth movies – Weird Science, About Last Night..., St. Elmo's Fire, et al. – they don't keep re-meeting each other on-screen either".

A July 1993 article in The Face was titled "The New Brit Pack", which included Naveen Andrews, Jaye Davidson, Craig Kelly, Jude Law, Rufus Sewell, David Thewlis, and Samuel West. In later years, the phrase "Brit Pack" has been used to describe disparate groups of young British actors of rising prominence. Publications also began including actresses such as Holliday Grainger, Kaya Scodelario, and Suki Waterhouse.

== See also ==
- Brat Pack
- Child actor
- Frat Pack – 1990s and 2000s
- Rat Pack – 1950s and 1960s
- Splat Pack
- Typecasting
