= Star Dance =

Star Dance may refer to:

- Stars Dance, debut album by Selena Gomez
- StarDance (Czech TV series), a Czech reality competition dance series based on Dancing with the Stars that has aired since 2006
- StarDance (Philippine TV series), a 2005 Philippine reality competition dance series
- Star Dancer, first novel in the Star Dancer tetralogy, written by the British author Beth Webb
- Star-Dancer, a Marvel Comics character

== See also ==
- Dance Star, 2010 British dance musical film
