= Jon-Paul Gates =

British actor

- Born: March 1980 (age 46); Greenford, Middlesex, England, UK
- Occupations: Actor, producer
- Years active: 1992–present

Jon-Paul Gates (born March 1980) is an actor who has starred in 96 feature films, predominantly playing the antagonist. Was born in Greenford, Middlesex under the name of Jon Morrey. He spent most of his childhood in a village near Doncaster, South Yorkshire and aspired to becoming a professional footballer before his career was cut short through injury and so decided on a career "treading the boards" instead.

He got his first break starring as Allan Hindle in the BBC's soap, Eldorado. Due to the show's unpopularity, he changed his professional name to Jon-Paul Gates in 1994. After various short films and a Channel 4 TV series, Focus North, he starred in his first feature film Cold Fish in 1999, playing the lead role of Alex. In 2001, he secured lead roles in Palm Tree's The Hawk & the Dove and played the antagonist Ida in Winter Warrior; which entered the top 10 DVD films in Russia in 2004. From 2002 to 2006 he accumulated more films in Europe; The Prodigal, Red Rose, Axe Raiders before trying his luck in the USA. After getting his big break in vampire flick Revamped, he starred in The Asylum's Dragon, with Gary Busey in Beyond the Ring and Danny Trejo in Dark Games. Travelling back and forth, he played the evil priest opposite Jeff Fahey and Martin Kove in Messages, Peter in Carmen's Kiss with Hugo Speer and Bruce Payne. Gates has also worked with Bruce Payne on Disturbance.

Jon-Paul Gates continues to work internationally portraying a variety of characters. After starring as Mr. Draper in Dance Star, he was the robotic over voices in Dark Side of Heaven; an alcoholic in Blood Forest, a boxer turned gangster in Villains, a medium in the Haunted franchise, a lawyer with a coke habit in Essex Boys:Retribution, an aggressive prison guard opposite Patrick Kilpatrick in Borstal, playing Dracula himself in The Howling, Rudi Schneider in 2019 UK independent horror film The Haunting of Borley Rectory, and a journalist who perishes in the 1958 Munich Air Disaster with Brian Cox in Believe. From 2020 to 2022 he starred in 16 movies including Sarah's husband in They're Outside", Henry, a Cafe Owner, in "Sorority", an Italian speaking vampire in "Nest of Vampires", a horrible criminal, The Spitter, in "the Lockdown Hauntings", a zany quizmaster in "Graphic Desires and a unscrupulous priest in "Werewolf Cabal". In 2023 Gates played the role of Canine in Howard J. Ford's thriller, Escape.
