= Tales of the Supernatural =

2014 British film

- Original poster
- Directed by: Steven M. Smith (segments "The Book, "The Hike", "Naked" & "Diary Of Disturbance"); Daniel Johnson (segments "Bryan's Daughter" & "Paralysis")
- Written by: Steven M. Smith (segments "The Hike", "Naked" & "Diary Of Disturbance"); Daniel Johnson (segments "Bryan's Daughter" & "Paralysis"); Matt Dickinson (segments "The Book")
- Produced by: Steven M. Smith; Joe Shefer; Joey Paul Gowdy; Daniel Johnson
- Starring: Bruce Payne; Jon Campling; Giles Alderson; Jon-Paul Gates
- Cinematography: Joe Gainsbough; Kirk Gaydon
- Edited by: Steven M. Smith; Barry Lupton
- Music by: Barry A. E. Covell; Kevin Leavy; Chrsi Davey
- Production company: Greenway Entertainment
- Distributed by: Greenway Entertainment; Monarch Films
- Release date: 17 October 2014
- Running time: 89 minutes
- Country: United Kingdom
- Language: English
- Budget: £35,000

Tales of the Supernatural is a 2014 British horror film. It is a portmanteau film consisting of six short tales. Segments are written by Steven M. Smith, Daniel Johnson and Matt Dickinson and directed by Steven M. Smith and Daniel Johnson. The cast includes Bruce Payne, Jon Campling and Jon-Paul Gates. It is planned for release on 17 October 2014 on DVD and VOD worldwide through Monarch Films Inc and Greenway Entertainment.

== Plot ==
The film consists of six supernatural tales (Disturbance, The Hike, Bryan's Daughter, The Book, Naked and Paralysis) linked together by a demon who is intent on collecting human souls.

== Cast ==
- Bruce Payne as Father Doyle
- Jon Campling as the Demon
- Giles Alderson as Dominic Mears
- Jon-Paul Gates as Andrew Flemming
- Victoria Pritchard as Hannah Flemming (segment Disturbance)
- Steven M. Smith as Hiker 2 (segment The Hike)
- Olivia Jewson as Mary (segment "The Hike")
- Aiste Gramantaite as Childminder (segment "Bryan's Daughter")
- Laura Penneycard as Kate Mears
- Juliet Lundholm as Lucy
- Lynsey Pow as Julia Caskin (segment "The Book")
- Debra Baker as Stephanie (segment "Bryan's Daughter")
- Jeremy Hill as The Tall Man (segment "The Hike")
- Joe Shefer as Michael (segment "The Hike")
- Nina Hatchwell as Angela (segment "Paralysis")
- Mia Baker as Mia (segment "Bryan's Daughter")
- Patrick Rowe as Young Priest
- Emma Claire Beckett as The Secretary / killer (segment "The Book")
- Stephanie Covell as Daughter (segment "The Book")
- Maria J.J. Smith as Little Girl (segment "The Hike")
- Toni Brooks as Sally (segment "The Hike")

== Reception ==
Sean Evans gave the film one star out of five and stated that it contained a 'rocky and quite frankly disjointed storyline'.
