= List of fellows of the Royal Society elected in 1986 =

This is a list of fellows of the Royal Society elected in 1986.

== Fellows of the Royal Society ==
1. Adrian Edmund Gill (1937–1986)
2. Thomas Nelson Marsham (1923–1989)
3. Allan Charles Wilson (1934–1991)
4. Dennis Chapman (1927–1999)
5. Michael Smith (1932–2000)
6. Nicholas Harold Lloyd Ridley (1906–2001)
7. Vulimiri Ramalingaswami (1921–2001)
8. John Marmion Edmond (1943–2001)
9. Sir William Mitchell (1925–2002)
10. John Argyris (1916–2004)
11. Gordon Richard Wray (1928–2005)
12. Michael Augustine Raftery (1936–2007)
13. Peter Berners Fellgett (1936–2008)
14. Sir William Ian Axford (1933–2010)
15. Sir Gabriel Horn (1927–2012)
16. Martin Fleischmann (1927–2012)
17. Sir Roy Malcolm Anderson
18. Sir Alec Broers, Baron Broers
19. Geoffrey Burnstock (1929–2020)
20. John Clarke
21. Peter Day
22. Richard Newland Dixon
23. Simon Kirwan Donaldson
24. John Derek Dowell
25. Charon Robin Ganellin
26. John Rodney Guest
27. Werner Israel
28. Sir Alec Jeffreys
29. Allen Kerr
30. Chris J. Leaver
31. George Huntly Lorimer
32. Robert Hall Michell
33. Henry Keith Moffatt
34. Peter Damian Richardson
35. Raymond Edward Smallman
36. Charles James Matthew Stirling
37. Sir John Sulston
38. Dame Jean Olwen Thomas
39. Sir David James Wallace
40. Elizabeth Kerr Warrington

== Foreign members ==
1. Piet Borst
2. Albert Jakob Eschenmoser
3. Antonio García-Bellido
4. Joseph Bishop Keller
5. Edwin Herbert Land (1909–1991)
6. Shosaku Numa (1929–1992)

== Elected under Statute 12 ==
1. Roger Makins, 1st Baron Sherfield (1904–1996)
