= Sketch Artist II: Hands That See =

1995 television film written by Michael Angeli and directed by Jack Sholder

- VHS cover
- Genre: Crime; Drama; Mystery; Thriller
- Written by: Michael Angeli
- Directed by: Jack Sholder
- Starring: Jeff Fahey; Courteney Cox
- Music by: Tim Truman, Marcus Barone (music supervisor)
- Country of origin: United States
- Original language: English

Production
- Cinematography: Bryan England
- Editor: Michael Schweitzer
- Running time: 95 minutes
- Production companies: Motion Picture Corporation of America; Showtime Networks

Original release
- Network: Showtime
- Release: January 28, 1995

Sketch Artist II: Hands That See, also known as Sketch Artist II and A Feel for Murder, is a 1995 American made-for-television crime-thriller film written by Michael Angeli and directed by Jack Sholder and starring Jeff Fahey and Courteney Cox. It is a sequel to the 1992 film Sketch Artist.

== Plot ==
Police artist Jack Whitfield (Fahey) is chasing a serial killer who seems to be unstoppable. The only surviving victim is Emmy O'Conner (Cox), who is blind. At first Jack is skeptical but she describes her attacker in uncanny detail and Jack becomes closer to catching the killer. But this man will stop at nothing to kill Emmy, the one who revealed his identity.

== Cast ==
- Jeff Fahey as Jack Whitfield
- Courteney Cox as Emmy O'Conner
- Michael Nicolosi as Rothko
- Jonathan Silverman as Glenn
- Michael Beach as George
- Scott Burkholder as Zip
- John Prosky as Sherman Bochs
- Robbie T. Robinson as Umpire
- Glenn Morshower as Bill Loman
- Paul Eiding as Sydney Burroughs
- Lin Shaye as Bonnie
- James Tolkan as Tonelli
- Stephen Rappaport as Brady Mullins
- Cindy Katz as Gina Papamichael
- Aaron Seville as Ellison
- Brion James as Larry Walker

== Reception ==
Variety said the script was "uneven" but "imaginative" and praised Fahey and especially Cox, who they called "terrific". They also praised Bryan England’s "cunning lensing", Virginia Lee’s production design, Michael Schweitzer’s editing, and Tim Truman’s score. Radio Times said it was an improvement on the first film "in regard to plot, if not in terms of casting, as the support team here is no substitute for the presence of Sean Young and Drew Barrymore in the original."
