= The Woodroffe School =

Location
- Uplyme Road; Lyme Regis, Dorset, DT7 3LX; England; 50.730°N 2.949°W

Information
- Former name: Lyme Regis Grammar School
- Type: Foundation school
- Motto: Alma Mater "Boldness and Constancy"
- Established: 1923
- Founder: Alban J. Woodroffe
- Local authority: Dorset
- Department for Education URN: 113901 Tables
- Ofsted: Reports
- Headmaster: Daniel Watts
- Staff: 100
- Gender: Coeducational
- Age: 11 to 18
- Enrolment: 1058
- Capacity: 1050
- Colours: Blue; Red; Light Blue
- Website: www.woodroffe.dorset.sch.uk

The Woodroffe School is a comprehensive school in Lyme Regis, Dorset, England.

== Lyme Regis Grammar School ==
From 1923, to 1971 the school was known as Lyme Regis Grammar School. It was the brain-child of Alban Woodroffe a prominent local landowner and educationalist who in 1922 supervised the construction of the original building on the hillside site overlooking the harbour town of Lyme Regis.

For the first forty years, the school was a small mixed grammar school drawing students from a wide rural and coastal area of West Dorset and East Devon. In 1950, a decision was taken to add boarding houses to the school with strong links being formed with armed services parents and those working overseas. In 1963, the grammar school was reorganised into an 11–18 mixed comprehensive school grant serving 200 square miles (520 square kilometres) or so around Lyme Regis. The school continued to take boarders, who were accommodated on three separate sites. In September 1991 became a grant-maintained school. Today there are 1,058 students on roll (sixth form 200); boarding has been phased out in line with the national decline in demand for places. The school assumed foundation status in September 1999.

== Development between 1999 and 2010 ==
The school retained most of its grammar school facilities until 2010 when the school's swimming pool was closed and a number of former rooms were converted into computer 'IT' suites. There were plans drawn up in the late 1990s, following the closure of Allhallows, Rousdon, and other private schools in the area due (mainly to declining pupil numbers in these smaller schools), for newer buildings to be established on 'top pitch', but this never came to anything. A number of the former huts on the site have been upgraded.

It was also during this time that the school receive arts college status. In 2011, an OFSTED inspection judged it 'Outstanding', the top mark.

== Notable alumni ==
- Adrian Bowyer, instigator and head of the global RepRap self-replicating 3D printer project.
- John Denham served as Member of Parliament (MP) for Southampton Itchen from 1992 to 2015.
- Chris Leaver, Professor of Botany at the University of Oxford
