= Steven M. Smith =

Australian and British scientist

Steven Smith
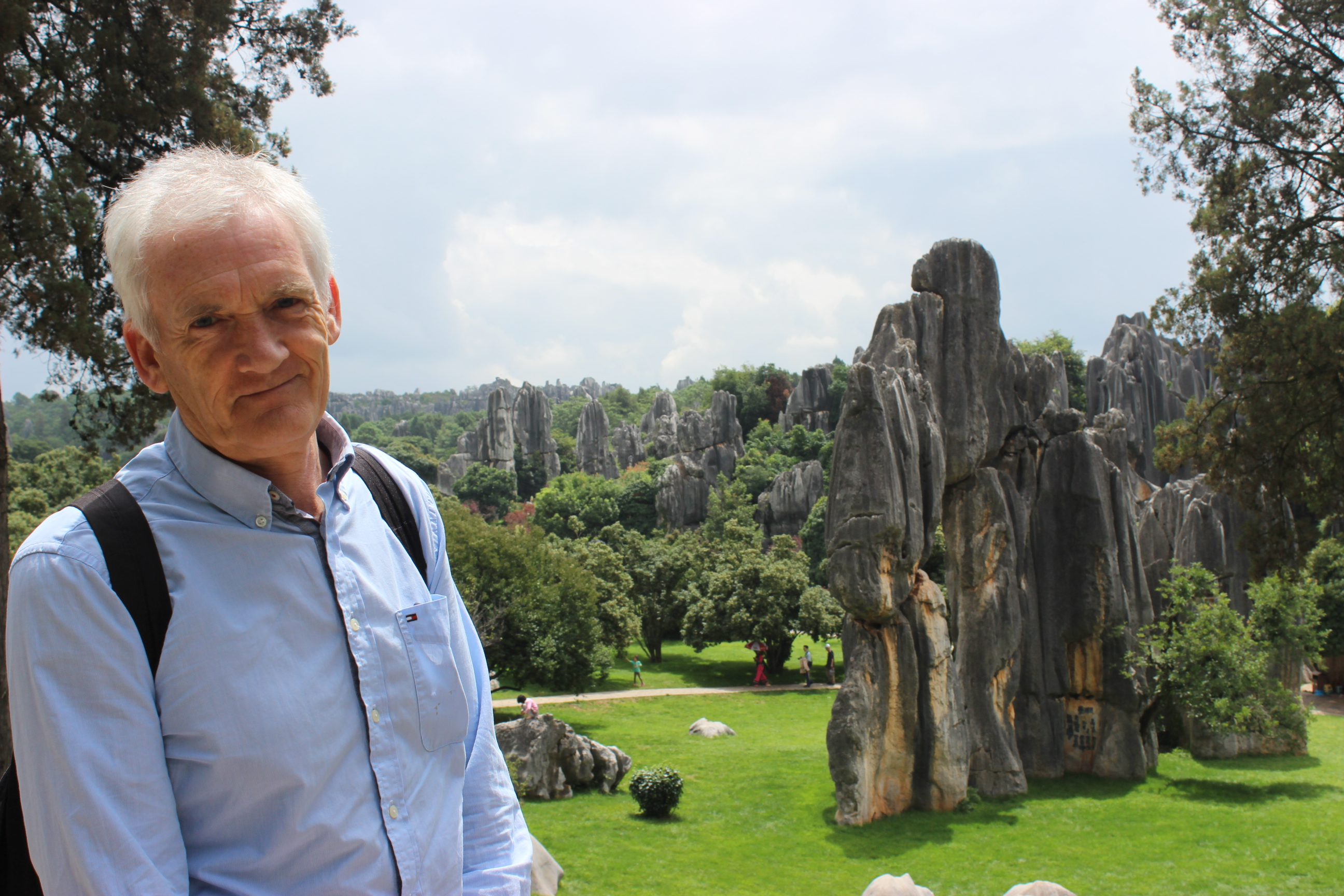
- Smith at the Stone Forest in China
- Born: Luton, England, United Kingdpm
- Education: University of Leicester (BA); Indiana University (MA); University of Warwick (PhD)
- Known for: Karrikins
- Spouse: Brenda Winning
- Children: 1 daughter
- Awards: Fellowship of the Institute of Biology (1998); Australian Research Council, Federation Fellowship (2004); Chinese Academy of Sciences, Visiting Professorship (2013); Chinese Academy of Sciences, President’s International Fellowship, (2014)
- Scientific career
- Fields: Plant Genetics and Biochemistry
- Workplaces: Rothamsted Experimental Station; Commonwealth Scientific and Industrial Research Organisation John Innes Institute; University of Edinburgh; University of Western Australia; Chinese Academy of Sciences Institute of Genetics and Developmental Biology University of Tasmania
- Thesis: Synthesis of the small subunit of ribulose-1,5-bisphosphate carboxylase
- Doctoral advisor: Reginald Ellis
- Doctoral students: Ian Graham
- Website: www.stevensmithresearch.com

Steven M. Smith (born c. 1960) is Emeritus Professor of Plant Genetics and Biochemistry at the University of Tasmania in Australia and Chief Investigator in the Australian Research Council Centre of Excellence for Plant Success in Nature and Agriculture.

== Education and early life ==
Smith was born and raised in Luton, England, United Kingdom. He attended Luton Grammar School and Luton Sixth Form College before becoming an Assistant Scientific Officer at Rothamsted Experimental Station in Harpenden, Hertfordshire. Working at Rothamsted inspired him to embark on a career in plant sciences and he obtained university entrance qualifications through ‘day-release’ and evening classes at Luton College of Technology.

== Career ==
He was awarded first class honours in Biological Sciences from the University of Leicester, then went to Indiana University in the United States to study for a master's degree under the supervision of Carlos Miller, the discoverer of kinetin. Smith returned to the United Kingdom to study for a PhD under the supervision of Professor Reginald Ellis at the University of Warwick during which time he conducted some of his research at the Plant Breeding Institute, in Cambridge. He was then awarded a Fellowship to carry out research at the Commonwealth Scientific and Industrial Research Organisation (CSIRO) Division of Plant Industry in Canberra, Australia. After a short period at the John Innes Institute in Norwich, he was appointed to a lectureship in the Botany Department at the University of Edinburgh. He spent 20 years in Edinburgh rising to become Head of the Institute of Molecular Plant Sciences. He served the Scottish Higher Education Funding Council as a Teaching Quality Assessor and was External Examiner at Ngee Ann Polytechnic in Singapore. Following the award of an Australian Research Council Federation Fellowship in 2004, Smith moved to the University of Western Australia and became Winthrop Professor of Plant Genomics. He was founding member of the Australian Research Council Centre of Excellence in Plant Energy Biology in 2005, and was a Chief Investigator until 2014. He also established and was Director of the Centre of Excellence for Plant Metabolomics. In 2015 he was appointed Professor of Plant Genetics and Biochemistry in the School of Biological Sciences at the University of Tasmania. In 2013 and 2014 he was awarded Fellowships by the Chinese Academy of Sciences and appointed Visiting Professor in the Institute of Genetics and Developmental Biology in Beijing.

== Research ==
Smith's research is directed towards understanding plant growth and development at the molecular level, and seeking ways to improve plant productivity and value.

During his PhD studies Smith collaborated with John Bedbrook at the Plant Breeding Institute to clone the first cDNA encoding a plant enzyme. This enzyme is ribulose-1,5-bisphosphate carboxylase/oxygenase, abbreviated to RuBisCO, which is responsible for carbon dioxide fixation by plants. In Edinburgh in the pre-genomics era, he collaborated with Chris Leaver and cloned several key enzymes of plant metabolism, including malate synthase, isocitrate lyase and PEP carboxykinase. He conceived an idea with Anthony Trewavas of creating transgenic plants expressing the calcium-sensitive luminous jellyfish protein, aequorin, to report calcium signalling in plants. Together they obtained funding, created the plants and showed that they could report rapid calcium signalling in response to cold, fungi, touch and wind. This work predated similar research using green fluorescent protein from the same jellyfish. In 1996, Smith and his PhD student Takeshi Takaha reported the discovery of cyclic glucans containing up to 200 glucose residues, which they named cycloamylose. Cycloamylose and related cycloglucans are now used extensively in food and biotechnology industries. Further research on starch metabolism with Alison Smith and Sam Zeeman at the John Innes Centre led to the discovery of a novel pathway of starch breakdown in leaves. Smith was also instrumental in defining pathways of energy metabolism involving peroxisomes, particularly fatty acid beta-oxidation and the glyoxylate cycle.

== Karrikins: a new family of plant growth regulators ==
Smith's current and most important contribution to plant biology lies in the establishment of karrikins as a major family of naturally occurring plant growth regulators, determination of karrikin mode of action and evolution of the karrikin response. Karrikins are small organic compounds produced by bushfires. They are washed into the soil by rain and stimulate germination of dormant seeds of fire-following plants that reside in the soil seed-bank. This response to karrikins is a specific evolutionary adaption of numerous fire-following plant species, providing them with the opportunity to grow and reproduce successfully in the post-fire environment.

Smith discovered that Arabidopsis thaliana can respond to karrikins under specific conditions and this provided the breakthrough required to discover their mode of action. His group was able to isolate karrikin-insensitive mutants in Arabidopsis, and the subsequent identification of the mutated genes revealed that karrikin perception and response required an alpha/beta hydrolase known as KARRIKIN INSENSITIVE 2 (KAI2) and an F-box protein known as MORE AXILARY GROWTH2 (MAX2). These discoveries revealed that karrikin signalling occurs by a similar mechanism to the signalling of chemically-related strigolactone hormones. Crucially, he established that karrikins and strigolactones are perceived independently, and elicit different responses in plants.

His research has further revealed that the usual function of KAI2 is to perceive an endogenous signalling compound that is neither karrikin nor strigolactone, but is probably very similar. He proposes that duplication of an ancestral KAI2 gene in early land plants led to the evolution of two genes in seed plants one of which perceives strigoactones and the other perceives the endogenous karrikin-like compound.

== Awards and recognition ==
- Science and Engineering Research Council UK, NATO Postdoctoral Fellowship, 1980
- Fellowship of the Institute of Biology, 1998
- Australian Research Council, Federation Fellowship 2004
- Chinese Academy of Sciences, Senior International Scientists Visiting Professorship, 2013
- Chinese Academy of Sciences, President's International Fellowship, 2015
- Thomson Reuters Highly Cited Researcher, 2016
- Clarivate Highly Cited Researcher, 2022

== Personal ==
Smith is married to Dr. Brenda Winning and they have one daughter, born in 1998. Smith is a side drummer in the City of Hobart Highland Pipe Band.
