= SitEx =

Content
- Description: protein functional sites on eukaryotic genes.

Contact
- Primary citation: Medvedeva & al. (2012)
- Release date: 2011

Access
- Website: http://www-bionet.sscc.ru/sitex/.

SitEx is a database that maps the protein functional sites on the genome.

== See also ==
- Active site
