= Infectious Diseases of Humans: Dynamics and Control =

- Author: Roy M. Anderson and Robert May
- Language: English
- Genre: Academic work
- Published: 1991
- Publisher: Oxford University Press
- Publication place: United Kingdom
- ISBN: 9780198540403

Infectious Diseases of Humans: Dynamics and Control is a book by Roy M. Anderson and Robert May, Baron May of Oxford originally published in 1991 by Oxford University Press. It is a seminal text in the mathematical modelling of infectious disease. The book covers both microparasites and macroparasites of humans.
