= Messages (film) =

2007 British film starring Jeff Fahey and Bruce Payne

- Directed by: David Fairman
- Written by: Wayne Kinsey and Ivan Levine
- Starring: Jeff Fahey; Bruce Payne; Jon-Paul Gates; Kim Thomson
- Release date: 2007
- Running time: 102 min.
- Country: United Kingdom
- Language: English

Messages is a 2007 British film written by Wayne Kinsey and Ivan Levine, directed by David Fairman and starring Jeff Fahey and Bruce Payne.

== Plot ==
The film is set in England where an American pathologist Dr. Richard Murray is grieving for his late wife Carol who died in a car crash a few months previously. Murray's grief is accentuated by the guilt that he feels as he was having an affair with another woman prior to Carol's death. As a consequence, Murray has started drinking large amounts of whiskey and is having blackouts, forgetting what has transpired in his previous drinking sessions.

Murray begins to receive messages on his computer which he believes to be clues to his wife's death. When he realises that in the same area a serial killer is attacking women he begins to suspect himself of the murders and of the murder of his wife.

== Cast ==
- Jeff Fahey as Dr. Richard Murray
- Kim Thomson as Frances Beale
- Jon-Paul Gates as Father Randall
- Martin Kove as DCI Collins
- Bruce Payne as Dr. Robert Golding
- Chris Wilson as Police Officer
- Geraldine Alexander as Carol
- Eileen Daly as Denise
- Samia Rida as Julie French

== Reception ==
The film received mixed reviews. A reviewer for British Film magazine described the film as "exuberantly acted" and a reviewer Cinemas Online stated that it contained "some mesmerizing performances". In contrast, Mark Kermode described the film as "an abysmal serial-killer thriller" with a "clodhopping script". Peter Bradshaw stated that "if you've a soft spot for a certain British kind of retro-Hammer silliness there's some enjoyment to be had here". Jamie Russell described the film as a "catalogue of crimes against horror cinema". In Jennie Kermode's view "if you like serial killer movies, Messages may not have the tightest story but it does deliver on gore" and "if you like ghost stories, it does a fairly good job".
