= Roy M. Anderson =

British expert on epidemiology

Sir Roy Anderson FRS FMedSci MAE
- Born: Roy Malcolm Anderson; 12 April 1947 (age 79); Hertfordshire, England, UK
- Education: Richard Hale School; Imperial College London (BSc, PhD)
- Known for: Infectious Diseases of Humans: Dynamics and Control
- Spouse: Janet Meyrick (m. 2014)
- Awards: Chalmers Medal (1988); Weldon Memorial Prize (1989); Croonian Lecture (1994)
- Scientific career
- Fields: Epidemiology; Biomathematics
- Workplaces: Imperial College London; King's College London; University of Oxford; Ministry of Defence
- Thesis: A quantitative ecological study of the helminth parasites of the bream Abramis brama (1971)
- Doctoral advisor: George Murdie
- Doctoral students: Sunetra Gupta; Angela Mclean; Graham Medley
- Website: www.imperial.ac.uk/people/roy.anderson

Sir Roy Malcolm Anderson FRS FMedSci MAE (born 12 April 1947) is a leading international authority on the epidemiology and control of infectious diseases. He is the author, with Robert May, of the most highly cited book in this field, entitled Infectious Diseases of Humans: Dynamics and Control. His early work was on the population ecology of infectious agents before focusing on the epidemiology and control of human infections. His published research includes studies of the major viral, bacterial and parasitic infections of humans, wildlife and livestock. This has included major studies on HIV, SARS, foot and mouth disease, bovine tuberculosis, bovine spongiform encephalopathy (BSE), influenza A, antibiotic resistant bacteria, the neglected tropical diseases and most recently COVID-19. Anderson is the author of over 650 peer-reviewed scientific articles with an h-index of 125.

== Education and early life ==
Anderson was born the son of James Anderson and Betty Watson-Weatherburn. He attended Duncombe School, Bengeo and Richard Hale School. He was awarded a first-class Bachelor of Science degree in zoology at Imperial College London followed by a PhD degree in parasitology in 1971.

== Career and research ==
He moved to the Biomathematics Department at the University of Oxford as an IBM research fellow working on stochastic models of infectious disease spread under Professor Maurice Bartlett FRS. He was appointed to a Lectureship in Parasitology at King's College London in 1974 before moving back to Imperial as a lecturer in Ecology and then becoming Professor of Parasite Ecology in 1982. He was head of the Department of Biology from 1984 to 1993. At Imperial College, he also served as Director of the Wellcome Centre for Parasite Infections from 1989 to 1993.

In 1993 Anderson moved to the University of Oxford where he was head of the Zoology department and held the Linacre Chair of Zoology at Merton College, Oxford until 2000. During this time he founded and served as Director of the Wellcome Centre for the Epidemiology of Infectious Disease - the first such centre in the UK entirely focused on research into the epidemiology and control of infectious diseases - until he resigned "following two damning reports on the way that the centre has been managed", however the director of the Wellcome Trust noted that there was “no question of the scientific credibility of Roy Anderson or the centre. It is doing first class work and our priority is to maintain that.”. His former doctoral students include Angela Mclean.

=== Chief Scientific Advisor of the Ministry of Defence ===
He was chief scientific advisor to the UK Ministry of Defence from October 2004 to September 2007. After that, he returned to his chair in Infectious Disease Epidemiology at the Department of Infectious Disease Epidemiology at Imperial College London.

=== Rector of Imperial College ===
Anderson was appointed the 14th Rector of Imperial College on 1 July 2008. In his time as Rector he focused on strengthening the emphasis on teaching as well as world renown research at Imperial, and on securing a new site in the White City, West London, to facilitate the expansion of Imperial's molecular and biomedical research, halls of residence, support for innovation and entrepreneurship and teaching facilities. He also negotiated the first overseas campus venture for Imperial in partnership with Nanyang Technological University in Singapore which led to the creation of the Lee Kong Chian School of Medicine in Singapore designed to train doctors to meet Singapore Healthcare needs. He tendered his resignation in November 2009 stating his wish to return to his primary interest in scientific research on global health issues.

=== Director of the London Centre for Neglected Tropical Disease Research ===
He established the London Centre for Neglected Tropical Diseases (LCNTDR) in 2013. The LCNTDR was launched with the aim of providing focused operational and research support for NTD control. The LCNTDR member institutions house leading NTD experts with a wide range of specialties, making the centre a valuable resource for cross-sectoral research and collaboration. It is a joint initiative between the Royal Veterinary College, Imperial College London, the London School of Hygiene & Tropical Medicine, and the Natural History Museum, London.

=== Membership of Councils, Boards and Committees (National and International) ===
He has sat on numerous government and international agency committees advising on public health and disease control including the World Health Organization, The European Commission, UNAIDS, and the Bill and Melinda Gates Foundation.

He is currently a Vice-President of Fauna Flora International, Chairman of Oriole Global Health Limited, Director of the London Centre for Neglected Tropical Disease Research, Trustee of the Banga Trust and a Trustee of the London Institute for Mathematical Sciences.

He was a non-executive director of GlaxoSmithKline 2008–2018, a member of the International Advisory Board of Hakluyt and Company Ltd. 2008–2019, and Chairman of the International Advisory Board of PTTGC Company Thailand, 2014–2018.

Other memberships:

- Member of the International Advisory Board of the Malaysian Government Biotechnology Initiative (Biotechnology Corporation), 2010-2017
- Chairman Pearson Independent Advisory Board on Making Education Work, 2012-2018
- Member of the Singapore National Research Foundation Fellowship Advisory Board, 2012-2015
- Trustee of the Natural History Museum, London, 2008–2016. Member of The Royal Society Science Policy Advisory Group, 2008-2014
- Member of the International Advisory Board of the Thailand National Science and Technology Development Agency, 2010-2017
- Chairman, Advisory Board, Gates Schistosomiasis Control Initiative (SCI), Imperial College, 2001-2018
- Member of the advisory panel of The Children's Investment Fund Foundation (CIFF), 2012-2015
- Member of the International Advisory board of ATHENA, (National AIDS Patient Database Charity), Amsterdam, Holland, 2002-2017
- Member of the Singapore National Research Foundation International Advisory Board, 2009-2012
- Chairman of the review board of the National Vaccine research programme in the Netherlands, 2011
- Chairman of the review board of the National Public Health services research in the Netherlands (RIVM), 2010
- Council Member Royal College of Art, 2008-2011
- Member of the Advisory Board of the Grantham Institute for Climate Change, Imperial College, 2007-2010
- Member of the Advisory Board of the Mathematics Institute, Imperial College London, 2007-2010
- Governor of the Institute for Government London, 2007-2011
- Chairman of the World Health Organization Science and Technology Advisory Board on Neglected Tropical Diseases, 2007-2011
- Member Scientific Advisory Board, Bill and Melinda Gates Initiative on Grand Challenges in Global Health, Gates Foundation, 2005-2011
- Chairman of the Defence Research and Development Board, Ministry of Defence UK, 2007-2008
- Chairman of the Major Investments Approval Board (IAB), Ministry of Defence, UK, 2004-2008
- Member of the Defence Council of the United Kingdom, 2004-2007
- Council member of the Engineering and Physical Sciences Research Council (EPSRC), 2004-2007
- Council member of the Royal United Services Institute (RUSI), 2005-2007
- Member of the Department of Health Science Advisory Board for Epidemic Outbreaks, 2001-2011
- Member of the Government Chief Scientist's Science Advisory Board for pandemic influenza, 2003-2010
- Chairman of the Science Advisory Council (SAC) of the UK Government's Department of Environment, Food and Rural Affairs (DEFRA), 2003-2005
- Member of the Science Advisory Committee of the UK Health Protection Agency, 2004-2006
- Member, US National Academies of Science Committee 'Advances in Technology and the Prevention of their Application to Next Generation Biowarfare Agents', 2003–06
- Member World Health Organization (WHO) Advisory Group on SARS, Geneva, 2003
- Member, Health Protections Agency (HPA) Advisory Group on SARS, 2003
- Member of the Advisory Board, Earth Institute, Columbia University, New York USA, 2003-2007
- Chairman, Canadian Innovation Fund Committee for Infectious Disease Research, 2002-2003
- Member of Science Advisory Group, Civil Contingencies Committee, 2001-2002
- Member of Foot and Mouth Scientific Advisory Group, 2001
- Member of the Advisory Board of the Bernard Nocht Institute of Tropical Medicine, Hamburg, 1999-2002
- Member of the International Advisory Panel for the Joint Infrastructure Fund run by Office of Science and Technology and the Wellcome Trust, 1999-2000
- Chairman, UNAIDS reference group on the Epidemiology of HIV/AIDS, 1999–2004.
- Member of the Spongiform Encephalopathy Advisory Committee (SEAC), 1997-2001
- Member of the UNAIDS Vaccine Advisory Committee (VAC) of the Joint United National Programme HIV/AIDS (UNAIDS), 1996-1999
- Member of Joint Committee on Vaccination & Immunisation, Department of Health, 1996-2000
- Member of the Scientific Advisory Board of the Isaac Newton Institute, University of Cambridge, 1995
- Council Member, London School of Hygiene and Tropical Medicine, 1993-2010
- The Wellcome Trust Trustee 1991, Governor, 1992-2000
- Council Member, Royal Postgraduate Medical School, 1992-1995
- Trustee, Tropical Health and Education Trust, 1991-2008

=== Selected publications ===
- Anderson, R. M.; May, R. M. (1978). "Regulation and stability of host-parasite population interactions: I. Regulatory processes". J. Anim. Ecol. 47 (1): 219–247. doi:10.2307/3933. JSTOR 3933.
- Anderson, R. M.; May, R. M. (August 1979). "Population biology of infectious diseases: Part I." Nature. 280 (5721): 361–7. Bibcode:1979Natur.280..361A. doi:10.1038/280361a0. PMID 460412. S2CID 2270842.
- May, R. M.; Anderson, R. M. (August 1979). "Population biology of infectious diseases: Part II". Nature. 280 (5722): 455–61. Bibcode:1979Natur.280..455M. doi:10.1038/280455a0. PMID 460424. S2CID 4352269.
- Anderson, R. M.; May, R. M. (1981). "The population dynamics of microparasites and their invertebrate hosts". Philosophical Transactions of the Royal Society B: Biological Sciences. 291 (1054): 451–524. Bibcode:1981RSPTB.291..451A. doi:10.1098/rstb.1981.0005. JSTOR 2395437.
- Anderson, R. M.; Gordon, D. M. (October 1982). "Processes influencing the distribution of parasite numbers within host populations with special emphasis on parasite-induced host mortalities". Parasitology. 85 (2): 373–98. doi:10.1017/S0031182000055347. PMID 7145478. S2CID 19196511.
- Anderson, R. M.; May, R. M. (October 1982). "Coevolution of hosts and parasites". Parasitology. 85 (Part 2) (2): 411–26. doi:10.1017/S0031182000055360. PMID 6755367. S2CID 26794986.
- May, R. M.; Anderson, R. M. (October 1983). "Epidemiology and genetics in the coevolution of parasites and hosts". Philosophical Transactions of the Royal Society B: Biological Sciences. 219 (1216): 281–313. Bibcode:1983RSPSB.219..281M. doi:10.1098/rspb.1983.0075. JSTOR 35852. PMID 6139816. S2CID 24069783.
- Anderson, R. M.; May, R. M. (November 1985). "Vaccination and Herd Immunity to Infectious Diseases". Nature. 318 (6044): 323–9. Bibcode:1985Natur.318..323A. doi:10.1038/318323a0. PMID 3906406. S2CID 4363751.
- May, R. M.; Anderson, R. M. (March 1987). "Transmission dynamics of HIV infection". Nature. 326 (6109): 137–42. Bibcode:1987Natur.326..137M. doi:10.1038/326137a0. PMID 3821890. S2CID 2872033.
- Nowak, M. A.; Anderson, R. M.; McLean, A. R.; Wolfs, T. F.; Goudsmit, J.; May, RM (November 1991). "Antigenic diversity thresholds and the development of AIDS". Science. 254 (5034): 963–9. Bibcode:1991Sci...254..963N. doi:10.1126/science.1683006. PMID 1683006.
- Anderson, R. M.; May, R. M. (1991). Infectious Diseases of Humans: Dynamics and Control. Oxford and New York: Oxford University Press. ISBN 978-0-19-854599-6.
- Anderson, R. M.; Donnelly, C. A.; Ferguson, N. M.; Woolhouse, M. E.; Watt, C. J.L; et al. (August 1996). "Transmission dynamics and epidemiology of BSE in British cattle". Nature. 382 (6594): 779–88. Bibcode:1996Natur.382..779A. doi:10.1038/382779a0. PMID 8752271. S2CID 8205375.
- Fraser, C.; Riley, S.; Anderson, R. M.; Ferguson, N. M. (April 2004). "Factors that make an infectious disease outbreak controllable". Proceedings of the National Academy of Sciences. 101 (16): 6146–51. Bibcode:2004PNAS..101.6146F. doi:10.1073/pnas.0307506101. PMC 395937. PMID 15071187.

== Honours and awards ==
Anderson was elected a Fellow of the Royal Society (FRS) in 1986, and was knighted in the 2006 Queen's Birthday Honours list. Other awards and honours include:

- Member of the Academia Europaea (MAE)
- Foreign Member, French Academy of Sciences
- Foreign Member, United States of America National Academy of Medicine
- Honorary Fellow, Royal Statistical Society
- Honorary Fellow, Royal Agricultural Society
- Honorary Fellow, Institute of Actuaries
- Honorary Fellow, Royal College of Pathologists
- Honorary Member, British Society for Parasitologists
- Honorary Fellow, Linacre College, Oxford
- Ernst Chain Prize, Imperial College, 2005
- Weldon Memorial Prize 1989
- Croonian Lecture 1994
- Distinguished Statistical Ecologist Award, American Society of Ecology 1998
- Huxley Memorial Medal, Imperial College, 1981
- Scientific Medal, Zoological Society of London, 1982
- C.A. Wright Memorial Medal, British Society for Parasitology, 1986
- David Starr Jordan Prize and Medal, Universities of Stanford, Cornell and Indiana, 1987
- Chalmers Memorial Medal, Royal Society of Tropical Medicine and Hygiene, 1988
- John Hull Grundy Lecture Medal 1990
- Frink Medal for British Zoologists, The Zoological Society of London, 1993
- Joseph Smadel Medal, Infectious Disease Society of America, 1994
- Storer Lecture Medal, University of California, Davis, 1994
- Croonian Prize, Royal Society, 1994
- Leiden Lecture Medal, Institute for Tropical Medicine, Rotterdam, 1995
- Thomas Francis Memorial Lecture Medal, University of Michigan, 1995
- Honorary DSc from the Universities of East Anglia, Aberdeen and Stirling

== Controversies ==
Anderson resigned from the University of Oxford after admitting that he had falsely alleged that a colleague, Sunetra Gupta, had won a position by having an affair with her head of department. He also resigned from the Wellcome Trust. Gupta demanded a public apology which Anderson later gave. Anderson moved, along with many of his staff, to Imperial College London.

== Personal life ==
Anderson married Janet Meyrick in April 2014 and has three step-children.

He enjoys walking, travel to remote destinations, natural history, conservation and wildlife photography.

Academic offices
Preceded by Richard Sykes	Rector of Imperial College London; 2008–2009	Succeeded by Keith O'Nions
