= Steven A. Hill =

Director of Research at Research England

Steven Hill
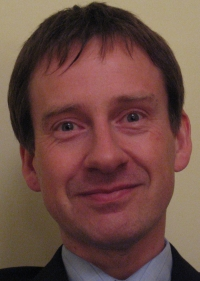
- Born: Steven Arthur Hill
- Education: University of Cambridge (BA); University of Edinburgh (PhD)
- Scientific career
- Fields: Science policy Plant sciences
- Workplaces: Research England; University of Oxford; Department for Environment, Food and Rural Affairs; Research Councils UK; Higher Education Funding Council for England
- Thesis: The regulation of mitochondrial function during early seedling development in cucumber (Cucumis sativus L.) (1990)
- Doctoral advisor: Chris Leaver
- Website: stevenhill.org.uk

Steven Arthur Hill is Director of Research at Research England, a council of UK Research and Innovation (UKRI).

== Education ==
Hill was educated at the University of Cambridge where he read Natural Sciences. He moved to the University of Edinburgh where he was awarded a PhD in 1990 for research on the regulation on mitochondrial function in Cucumis sativus L. seedlings supervised by Chris Leaver.

== Career and research ==
After various postdoctoral research appointments, Hill served as a Lecturer in the Department of Plant Sciences at the University of Oxford for eight years. He moved into science policy, with two roles at the Department for Environment, Food and Rural Affairs (DEFRA), focussing on bringing science and research into policy-making. Subsequently, he was appointed head of the strategy unit at Research Councils UK (RCUK), and then took up the post of head of research policy at the Higher Education Funding Council for England (HEFCE) in 2013.
