= Ian A. Graham =

British biologist (born 1963)

Ian Graham FRS
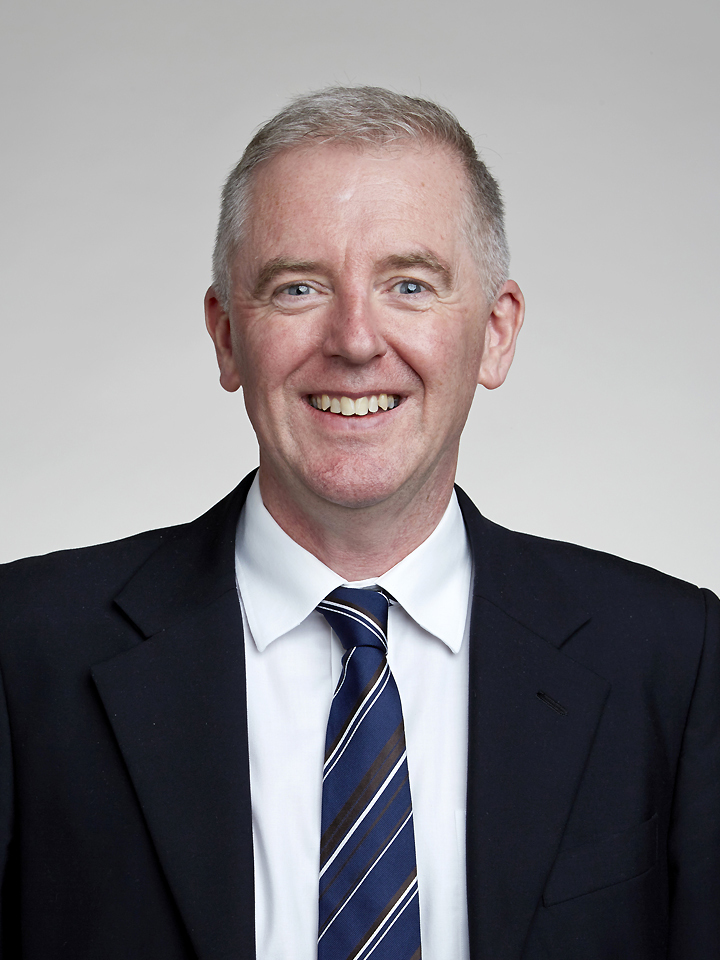
- Graham in 2016
- Born: 1963 (age 62–63); Castlederg, Northern Ireland
- Education: Omagh Academy; Queen's University Belfast; University of Edinburgh
- Awards: EMBO Member (2016)
- Scientific career
- Workplaces: University of Glasgow; Stanford University; University of York
- Thesis: Structure and function of the cucumber malate synthase gene and expression during plant development (1989)
- Doctoral advisor: Steven M. Smith; Chris J. Leaver
- Website: york.ac.uk/biology/research/plant-biology/ian-a-graham/

Ian Alexander Graham FRS (born 1963) is a professor of biochemical genetics in the Centre for Novel Agricultural Products at the University of York.

== Education ==
Graham was educated at Castlederg Secondary School and Omagh Academy. He studied botany and genetics at Queen's University Belfast, where he was awarded a Bachelor of Science degree in 1986. He was awarded a PhD from the University of Edinburgh in 1989 for research investigating the structure and function of the malate synthase gene in cucumber supervised by Steven M. Smith and Chris J. Leaver.

== Career and research ==
From 1990 to 1993 he was a postdoctoral researcher in the Department of Plant Sciences at the University of Oxford. He was appointed a lecturer in the division of Biochemistry and Molecular Biology at University of Glasgow from 1994 to 1999. During 1994, he was a SERC/NATO funded research scientist in Department of Plant Biology at Stanford University. He has been chair of biochemical genetics at York since 1999.

Graham's interests include how plants make and breakdown various metabolites, how these processes are controlled and how they impact on plant growth. He has used biochemical genetics to dissect the main metabolic pathways controlling oil mobilisation in Arabidopsis seed and provided new insight into how a lipid based signal controls seed germination. He has used similar approaches to investigate the synthesis of bioactive compounds in two of the world's major medicinal plants. This has led to new understanding of how genome rearrangement has shaped the evolution of plant metabolism. The discovery of a 10 gene cluster responsible for the production of the anti-cancer compound noscapine in opium poppy provided the tools for molecular breeding of new commercial varieties. The discovery of a novel Cytochrome P450 – oxidoreductase gene fusion described the last unknown step in synthesis of morphine and codeine. Characterisation and genetic mapping of traits responsible for production of artemisinin in Artemisia annua has enabled development of F1 hybrid seed that can deliver a robust source of this vital antimalarial medication for the developing countries.

=== Awards and honours ===
Graham was elected a Fellow of the Royal Society (FRS) in 2016. Additionally, Graham was elected as a member of the European Molecular Biology Organization (EMBO) in 2016, and was awarded the Biochemical Society's Heatley Medal and Prize in 2017.
