= Ray Smallman =

British metallurgist (1929–2015)

Professor Ray Smallman CBE FRS FREng
- Born: Raymond Edward Smallman; 4 August 1929; Wolverhampton, England
- Died: 25 February 2015 (aged 85)
- Education: University of Birmingham
- Spouse: Doreen Faulkner (m. 1952)
- Awards: CBE 1992; FREng; FRS
- Scientific career
- Thesis: An investigation into the crystal structure of cold worked metals (1953)
- Doctoral advisor: Alan Cottrell

Raymond Edward Smallman (4 August 1929 – 25 February 2015) was a British metallurgist and academic known for his research into alloys and the causes of metal fatigue. Smallman was also a significant figure at the University of Birmingham, serving as its vice-principal between 1987 and 1992 and helping to establish its reputation as a leading modern research university.

== Early life and education ==
Smallman was born in Wolverhampton, West Midlands, the third of five children of a working-class couple. Smallman spent much of his childhood near Cannock, Staffordshire, working at his father's fish and chips shop while his father served with the Royal Air Force during World War II. Between 1939 and 1947, Smallman attended a grammar school in Rugeley, Staffordshire, on a scholarship. He then obtained a first-class honours degree in metallurgy at the University of Birmingham, supervised by Alan Cottrell. Smallman completed his PhD on the structure of cold worked metals, again under Cottrell's supervision, in 1953.

== Research and career ==
After completing his doctorate, Smallman went to work as a metallurgical researcher at the Atomic Energy Research Establishment (AERE) in Harwell, Oxfordshire. At AERE, Smallman and his colleagues were among the first to study the structure of metals using electron microscopy, discovering previously unknown microstructures and defects including dislocation "loops". In 1958, in collaboration with scientists from Cambridge's Cavendish Laboratory, Smallman published a groundbreaking paper on these dislocations, which provided key evidence for an emerging theory of metal fatigue with important implications for metallurgy and engineering.

Thereafter, Smallman returned to the University of Birmingham as a lecturer in physical metallurgy, and oversaw the development of a highly successful metallurgical research team. In 1964, he was appointed Chair of Birmingham's Department of Physical Metallurgy, becoming the Head of the Department of Metallurgy and Materials in 1980. In 1985, Smallman oversaw the founding of an independent, research-focused Faculty of Engineering at Birmingham, and subsequently became the new faculty's Dean. ISmallman was elected a Fellow of the Royal Society (FRS) in 1986, and was elected a Fellow of the Royal Academy of Engineering in 1991.

In 1987, Smallman became the Vice-Principal of the university, a position he held until 1992. As Vice-Principal, he implemented numerous university-wide administrative and academic reforms, and helped to strengthen the university's links to industry and commerce. Smallman's reforms were credited with helping to raise Birmingham's national and international profile as a major research university. In his later years, Smallman was a visiting lecturer at numerous universities and scientific societies worldwide.

== Honours and awards ==
- 1969: awarded Beilby Medal and Prize from the Royal Society of Chemistry
- 1992: appointed a Commander of the Order of the British Empire.

== Personal life ==
Smallman married Doreen Faulkner in September 1952. They remained married for the rest of Smallman's life; she survived him, as did their two children.
