= They're Outside =

- Official release poster
- Directed by: Sam Casserly; Airell Anthony Hayles
- Written by: Airell Anthony Hayles
- Produced by: Miles Anthony; Airell Anthony Hayles; Dovile Kirvelaityte; Jezz Vernon
- Starring: Emily Booth; Brad Moore; Nicholas Vince; Jon-Paul Gates; Emma Burdon-Sutton; Chrissy Randall; Tom Wheatley; Nicole Miners; Rob Craine
- Edited by: Sam Casserly; James John Perkins
- Music by: Sascha Blank
- Production company: The Haunted Cinema
- Release date: August 29, 2020 (FrightFest)
- Running time: 83 minutes
- Country: United Kingdom
- Language: English

They're Outside is a 2020 horror film that was directed by Sam Casserly and Airell Anthony Hayles, the latter of whom also wrote the film's script.

The film had a digital premiere at the August 2020 edition of FrightFest.

== Plot ==
The film is presented as a documentary focused on an unaired episode of the YouTube show Psychology-Inside/Out, where celebrity psychologist Max Spencer diagnoses and treats patients with various mental illnesses. After filming the episode he and his girlfriend Nicole, who also served as his cameraperson, disappeared off the face of the earth.

For the episode Max had planned to focus on Sarah, a woman living near Hastings and suffering from severe agoraphobia after the death of her daughter from a car accident. Max boasts that he can not only help Sarah, he can also have her leave her home in only ten days time. Once there Max and Nicole learn that Sarah believes in the local legend of Green Eyes, a practitioner of magic who would spirit people away to his home, after which they would never be seen or heard from again. Max is dismissive of the claims, even as strange things happen around him. He eventually learns that Sarah lied about her daughter's death, as she claims that her daughter went missing in the forest and was taken by Green Eyes.

Ultimately Sarah does leave the house with Max after being tricked by Green Eyes by a vision of her daughter. The two walk through an endless woods until they arrive at Green Eyes's hut. Terrified, Sarah refuses to enter while Max readily does. The inside resembles a basement, where he sees a covered body and a bowl of fruit on a table. Max begins to hear voices telling him to kill Sarah, which he does after leaving the hut. Max then rambles about how Sarah was a hopeless case but that he will continue to try to help others. He then turns to see glowing green eyes and barricades himself in the basement/hut. Max then looks at the camera and gives the signout for his YouTube show.

== Cast ==
- Emily Booth as Penny
- Brad Moore as Chris
- Nicholas Vince as Richard
- Jon-Paul Gates as Sarah's Husband
- Emma Burdon-Sutton as Sandra
- Chrissy Randall as Sarah
- Tom Wheatley as Max
- Nicole Miners as Nicole
- Rob Craine as Green Eyes

== Production ==
Co-director and screenwriter Airell Anthony Hayles drew inspiration for the film's premise from several places. When he was a child he learned that his uncle had agoraphobia, which fascinated him. Hayles also wanted to write a supernatural film akin to Ghostwatch and The Sixth Sense, but had difficulty finding an idea that he liked. Other film inspirations included Picnic at Hanging Rock and the 1973 movie The Wicker Man. He came up with the idea of They're Outside after asking himself "What if a person's agoraphobia was linked to supernatural events, rather than being a purely psychological condition?" Hayles was unsatisfied with his first version of the screenplay, as he felt that it was not working and that it "did not feel right in its mood and energy for quite some time". He later re-wrote the film as found footage, stating "it found its heartbeat, and in my opinion the same story was suddenly filled with far more immediacy and energy."

Actress Emily Booth was brought on to portray the character of Penny, a role that Hayles wrote with her in mind as "Emily and I are both from Hastings where the film is set, so I knew she'd understand the vibe of the pagan community there and bring heart and a sense of fun to the role." Hayles and co-director Sam Casserly had a limited budget for the production and as a result utilized some guerrilla film making and kept the movie at a single location, Hastings, East Sussex.

== Release ==
They're Outside premiered on 29 August 2020 at FrightFest. The event was held digitally as a result of the COVID-19 pandemic.

== Reception ==
Common elements of praise for They're Outside focused on the acting and the film's atmosphere. Kim Newman praised the acting of Emily Booth, stating that she was "a hoot as a primary school teacher who used to be the coked-up presenter of a hot air balloon dating show called Love is in the Air". Starburst listed Chrissy Randall's character as a highlight, as they felt she "realistically conveys the struggles of an agoraphobia sufferer". Flickering Myth and Nerdly were more critical, with Flickering Myth writing that "it sometimes feels a tad sluggish and over-encumbered with melodramatic subplots, yet this is still a solid calling card for its filmmaking duo."
