= Dance Star =

- She Is The One...
- Directed by: Steven M. Smith
- Written by: Steven M. Smith
- Produced by: Steven M. Smith; Keeley Scott
- Starring: Bruce Payne; Vivien Creegor; Jon-Paul Gates; Megan Little
- Cinematography: Kirk Gaydon
- Edited by: Barry Lupton
- Music by: Barry A. E. Covell
- Distributed by: Greenway Entertainment Amazon rental
- Release date: 7 March 2010
- Running time: 91
- Country: United Kingdom
- Language: English

Dance Star is a 2010 British dance musical film set in Essex, UK. It was written and directed by Steven M. Smith. The cast includes Bruce Payne, Megan Little Vivien Creegor and Jon-Paul Gates.

== Plot ==
A teenager named Josie has never performed or auditioned for anybody at a professional level. But when her father leaves the family home she decides to enter a local talent competition which reveals her innate ability to dance.

== Cast ==
- Kristina Ballard as Judge Master
- Vivien Creegor as Helen
- Jon-Paul Gates as Mr. Draper
- Jasmine Harris as Sara
- Rebecca Hedges as Morgan
- Megan Little as Josie
- Laura Macallister as Sophia
- Bruce Payne as Harry
- John Scott as Judge #2
- Chantelle Severin as Trish
- Steven M. Smith as Colin
- Tabitha Smythe as Keeta
- Damion Spencer as Street Dancer #1
