= Sketch Artist =

1992 television film written by Michael Angeli and directed by Phedon Papamichael

- Genre: Crime; Drama; Mystery; Thriller
- Written by: Michael Angeli
- Directed by: Phedon Papamichael
- Starring: Jeff Fahey; Sean Young; Drew Barrymore
- Music by: Mark Isham
- Country of origin: United States
- Original language: English

Production
- Producers: Brad Krevoy; Steven Stabler
- Cinematography: Wally Pfister
- Editor: Carole Kravetz Aykanian
- Running time: 88 minutes
- Production companies: Motion Picture Corporation of America; Showtime Networks

Original release
- Network: Showtime
- Release: June 27, 1992

Sketch Artist, also known as The Sketch Artist, is a 1992 American made-for-television crime-thriller film written by Michael Angeli and directed by Phedon Papamichael and starring Jeff Fahey, Sean Young and Drew Barrymore. It was released theatrically in Canada, Sweden and South Korea.

== Plot ==
During a homicide investigation, a police sketch artist realizes a witness is describing a suspect resembling the wife of the artist, Jack Whitfield, down to the last detail. Conflicted by this revelation, he withholds pertinent information and begins his own search for the truth.

== Cast ==
- Jeff Fahey as Detective Jack Whitfield
- Sean Young as Rayanne Whitfield
- Frank McRae as Milon
- Drew Barrymore as Daisy
- Tchéky Karyo as Paul Korbel
- James Tolkan as Tonelli
- Stacy Haiduk as Claire
- Charlotte Lewis as Leese
- Mark Boone Junior as Sturges
- Ric Young as Jimmy
- Brad Johnson as Peter

== Reception ==
Variety said it had a "smart script by journalist Michael Angeli and a strong lead performance by Jeff Fahey."

== Sequel ==
A sequel starring Fahey and Courteney Cox, Sketch Artist II: Hands That See, followed in 1995.
