= Michael Angeli =

American writer and television producer

- Born: 1970 or 1971 (age 54–55)
- Education: University of Wisconsin
- Occupations: Screenwriter, television producer
- Writing career
- Genre: Television dramas
- Subjects: Celebrity ghost-writer and profiler
- Notable works: Chyna: If They Only Knew (co-author, 2001, ISBN 978-0-06-039329-8)

Michael Angeli (born 1970/1971) is an American writer and television producer, best known for his award-nominated work on television series including Monk and the remake of Battlestar Galactica, a show for which he was also a co-executive producer.

Angeli was co-executive producer on Black Sails, a pirate adventure drama that premiered on the Starz Network in January, 2014.

Angeli is currently in pre-production on "The Confessions of Al McGuire," a biopic with Anthony Hemingway to direct.

== Early years ==
Angeli is a University of Wisconsin graduate with a bachelor's degree in psychology.

== Career ==
As a screenwriter, his television credits include the TV movies Killing Mr. Griffin, Sketch Artist and Sketch Artist II, and several television series, including: Now and Again, Dark Angel, Cover Me, Medium, Monk, Touching Evil (U.S. version), In Plain Sight, Law & Order: SVU, Playmakers (ESPN's first drama), Law & Order: Criminal Intent, Battlestar Galactica and its spin-off/prequel, Caprica.

Angeli is co-author of the autobiography of World Wrestling Federation performer Chyna. Angeli ghost-wrote My Lives, the Roseanne Barr autobiography (credited on the fly page). He profiled celebrity for such magazines as Playboy, Cosmopolitan, and Esquire.

As a free-lance writer, Angeli has covered sports and pop culture for The New York Times, Los Angeles Magazine, Details, and Sports Illustrated. An advocate of the participatory journalism elevated by the late George Plimpton, Angeli's exploits included spending 24 hours in Central Park, trying out for in-line Roller Derby, and a six-game road trip with The Los Angeles Lakers.

In July 2013, it was revealed that he has been working on a currently unannounced video game created by Santa Monica Studio.

Angeli is the co-executive producer of the 2019 CBS drama, "The Code" which debuted on April 9, 2019.

== Accolades ==
In 2004, Angeli was nominated for an Edgar Award for Best Episode in a TV Series, for his work on "Mr. Monk and the 12th Man". In 2005 Angeli and the creative staff of the drama series, "Battlestar Galactica" won a Peabody Award. At the 60th Primetime Emmy Awards in 2008, Angeli was nominated for an Emmy Award for Outstanding Writing for a Drama Series, for his work on the Battlestar Galactica episode "Six of One".

Fellow television writer/producer Jane Espenson has called his scripts "literary objects in their own right."

Battlestar Galactica creator Ronald D. Moore:

As per an interview excerpt from So Say We All: The Complete, Uncensored, Unauthorized Oral History of Battlestar Galactica:

"Michael Angeli is a fascinating guy. During one interim period between the time that I was working at Universal and the time that they decided to develop Galactica into a series, they said, 'Until then, we would like for you to come in and work on another show called Touching Evil, which was a US version of a British show.' He was running the writers' room and I came in to write a script. That was how I met him. He is hilarious, cynical, and very well-read. He was a journalist earlier. But he has excellent chops as a writer." There's an intensity about it and the language is beautiful. Michael Taylor was a little bit later, and he's definitely a writer's writer. You read what he writes and you get totally sucked in...sometimes at the expense of the show, because you read it and you say, 'Wow, this is amazing!' And then you have to stop and think, 'Okay. Now does this actually work as an hour of television?' That's the kind of thing. But Michael is a lot of fun in the room. He has great imagination. He's not afraid to throw out [...]"

Excerpt From: Edward Gross & Mark A. Altman. “So Say We All: The Complete, Uncensored, Unauthorized Oral History of Battlestar Galactica.” iBooks.
