= Jeff Fahey =

American actor (born 1952)

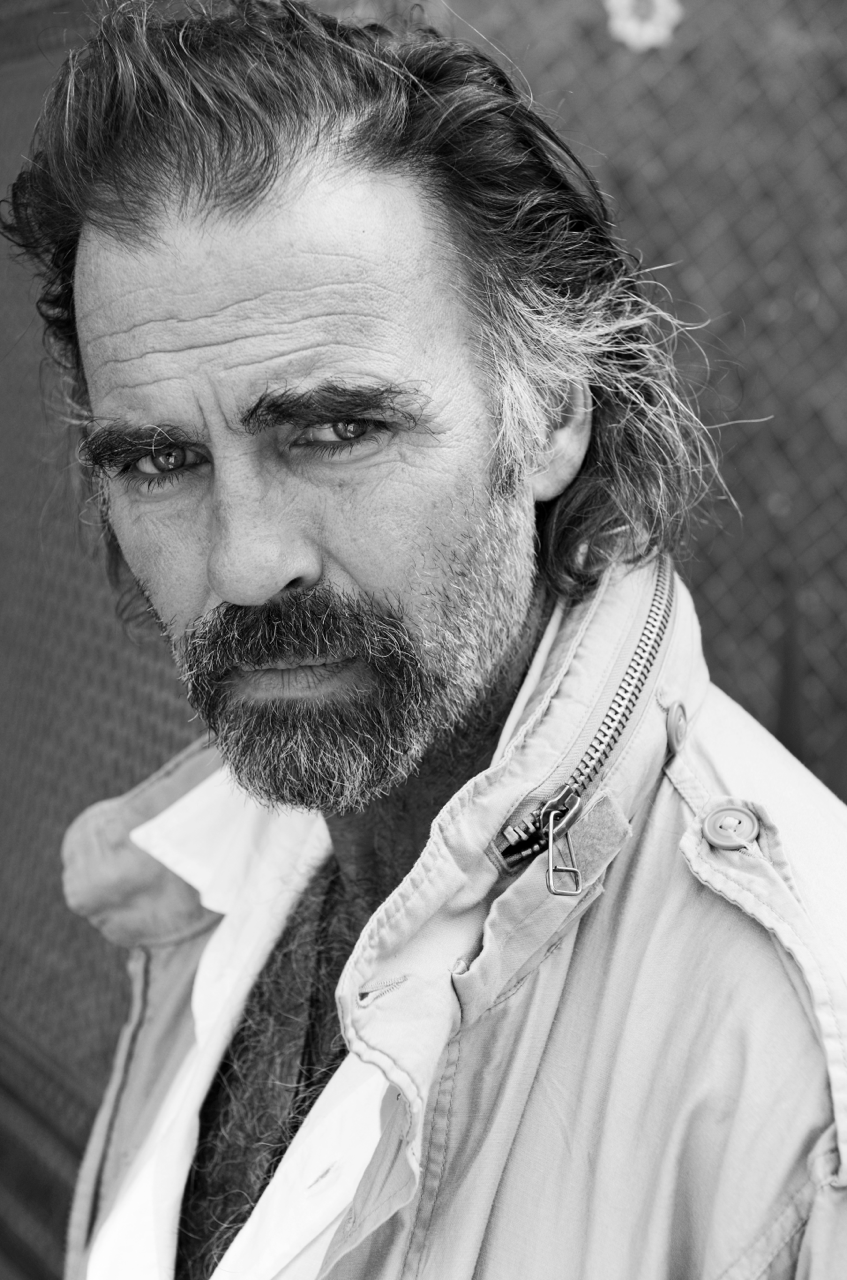
- Fahey in 2014
- Born: Jeffrey David Fahey; November 29, 1952 (age 73); Olean, New York, U.S.
- Occupation: Actor
- Years active: 1980–present

Jeffrey David Fahey (/ˈfeɪhi/, born November 29, 1952) is an American actor. His notable roles include Duane Duke in Psycho III (1986), Pete Verill in Clint Eastwood's White Hunter Black Heart (1990), Jobe Smith in The Lawnmower Man (1992), and Captain Frank Lapidus on the ABC series Lost (2008–2010). He is also known for his collaborations with director Robert Rodriguez, appearing in his films Planet Terror (2007), Machete (2010), and Alita: Battle Angel (2019).

== Early life and education ==
Fahey was born in Olean, New York, the sixth of 13 siblings in an Irish-American family. His mother, Jane, was a homemaker, and his father, Frank Fahey, worked at a clothing store. Fahey was raised in Buffalo, New York, from the age of ten and attended Father Baker's high school there. Fahey left home at the age of 17, subsequently hitchhiking to Alaska. He later backpacked through Europe, and worked on an Israeli kibbutz.

== Career ==
Fahey started performing when he won a full scholarship to dance at the Joffrey Ballet School at the age of 25. He performed in theaters across the United States and on Broadway. He landed his first major role on television playing Gary Corelli on the soap opera, One Life to Live.

In 1985, he received his first major film role as Tyree in Silverado. In 1986, he co-starred with Anthony Perkins in Psycho III as Duane Duke, a money-desperate guitarist who is hired by Norman Bates to work at the Bates Motel. That same year, Fahey guest starred on the Season 3 premiere of Miami Vice as gun dealer Eddie Kaye, famously destroying Detective Sonny Crockett's Ferrari Daytona.

In 1990, Fahey starred in Impulse and White Hunter Black Heart, respectively directed by feuding ex-couple Sondra Locke and Clint Eastwood. Also that year, he played the title role in the TV movie Parker Kane alongside Marisa Tomei. In 1992, he starred alongside Pierce Brosnan in The Lawnmower Man. In 1995, Fahey was the lead in the Trimark Pictures adventure film Eye of the Wolf, directed by Arnaud Sélignac, based on the book KAZAN by James Oliver Curwood.

In 1995, he starred as Winston McBride on ABC's The Marshal. In 1999, he played the main character in Apocalypse II: Revelation. In 2007, he appeared in the Robert Rodriguez film Planet Terror and starred in Messages with Bruce Payne.

Fahey appeared as daredevil Dutch the Clutch in an episode of Psych at the beginning of the third season of the show.

Fahey played Frank Lapidus, the airplane and helicopter pilot of the research team sent to the island in Lost, as a recurring character in the fourth and fifth seasons, and as a regular character in the sixth season.

In 2010, he had a major role in Robert Rodriguez's action film Machete.

In 2013, a new production of the play Twelve Angry Men took place at the Garrick Theatre in London, running until March 2014. Fahey played the part of the last juror in the story to change his vote to not guilty. Other actors appearing in this production were Martin Shaw who played the part of juror number 8, Robert Vaughn, and Nick Moran.

In 2015, Fahey starred in History Channel's mini-series Texas Rising as Tom Rusk, the Secretary of War for the new Republic of Texas who fought alongside General Sam Houston.

In 2017, Fahey joined the UK tour of Bill Kenwright's production of Gore Vidal's The Best Man where he plays the part of US presidential hopeful Joseph Cantwell against political rival William Russell, played by Martin Shaw.

== Humanitarian efforts ==
In 2006 and 2007, Fahey spent time in Afghanistan assisting the newly established American University of Afghanistan and launching a project to assist orphans in Kabul.

Fahey's humanitarian work has revolved around the U.S. Committee for Refugees and Immigrants, focusing on the subject of warehousing, a practice in which the rights and mobility of refugees are restricted by a host country. Fahey's work specifically has addressed the subject of warehoused Sahrawi refugees in Algeria.

He received the Humanitarian Award in 2022 at the Monaco Streaming Film Festival.

== Filmography ==
=== Film ===
- Silverado (1985) - Deputy Tyree
- Psycho III (1986) - Duane Duke
- Riot on 42nd St. (1987) - Frank Tackler
- Backfire (1988) - Donnie McAndrew
- Split Decisions (1988) - Ray McGuinn
- True Blood (1989) - Raymond Trueblood
- Minnamurra (1989) - Ben Creed
- The Serpent of Death (1989) - Jake Bonner
- The Last of the Finest (1990) - Detective Ricky Rodriguez
- Impulse (1990) - Stan Harris
- White Hunter Black Heart (1990) - Pete Verrill
- Body Parts (1991) - Dr. Bill Chrushank
- Iron Maze (1991) - Barry Mikowski
- The Lawnmower Man (1992) - Jobe Smith
- The Hit List (1993) - Charlie Pike
- Quick (1993) - Muncie
- Woman of Desire (1994) - Jack Lynch
- Freefall (1994) - Dex Dellum
- Wyatt Earp (1994) - Ike Clanton
- Temptation (1994) - Eddie Lanarsky
- Serpent's Lair (1995) - Tom Bennett
- Darkman III: Die Darkman Die (1996) - Peter Rooker
- Lethal Tender (1996) - Detective David Chase
- Small Time (1996) - The Dutchman
- The Sweeper (1996) - Dale Goddard
- Catherine's Grove (1997) - Jack Doyle
- The Underground (1997) - Brian Donnegan
- Time Under Fire (1997) - Alan Deakins / John Deakins
- Extramarital (1998) - Griffin
- Detour (1998) - Danny Devlin
- The Last Siege: Never Surrender (1999) - Eddie Lyman
- When Justice Fails (1999) - Tom Chaney
- Apocalypse II: Revelation (1999) - Thorold Stone
- No Tomorrow (1999) - Davis
- Dazzle (1999) - The Collector
- The Contract (1999) - Detective Tucci
- Epicenter (2000) - FBI Agent Moore
- The Sculptress (2000) - Matthew Dobie
- The Newcomers (2000) - Mack Weatherton
- Spin Cycle (2000) - Vinnie "Tall Vinnie"
- Blind Heat (2001) - Paul Burke
- Out There (2001) - Agent Gary Booth
- Cold Heart (2001) - Dr. Phil Davis
- Maniacts (2001) - Joe Spinelli
- Outlaw (2001) - Jim Moran
- Choosing Matthias (2001) - Charlie
- Inferno (2002) - Robert "Jake" Wheeler
- Unspeakable (2002) - The Governor
- Fallen Angels (2002) - Professor Richard Leighton
- Ghost Rock (2004) - Moses Logan
- No Witness (2004) - Senator Gene Haskell
- Close Call (2004) - Elliot Krasner
- Darkhunters (2004) - Mr. Barlow
- Blue Demon (2004) - General Remora
- Day of Redemption (2004) - Frank Everly
- Corpses (2004) - Captain Winston
- Killing Cupid (2005) - The Trainer
- Split Second (2005) - Mr. Kudis
- Only the Brave (2006) - Lieutenant William Terry
- Scorpius Gigantus (2006) - Major Nick Reynolds
- The Hunt for Eagle One: Crash Point (2006) - Colonel Halloran
- Diablita (2007) - Bill Rockwell
- Messages (2007) - Dr. Richard Murray
- Planet Terror (2007) - J.T. Hague
- Matchmaker Mary (2008) - Cameron Banks
- Machete (2010) - Michael Booth
- Terror Trap (2010) - Sheriff Cleveland
- Blacktino (2011) - Cooter
- Marriage Retreat (2011) - Craig Sullivan
- Dadgum, Texas (2011) - Robert E Lee Magee
- Eldorado (2012) - "Doc" Martin
- Easy Rider: The Ride Back (2012) - Wes Coast
- Hatfields and McCoys: Bad Blood (2012) - Devil Anse Hatfield
- Sushi Girl (2012) - Morris
- Guns, Girls and Gambling (2012) - The Cowboy
- 100 Below Zero (2013) - Steve Foster
- Beneath (2013) - George Marsh
- The Last Light (2014) - Harold
- Dawn Patrol (2014) - "Trick"
- Skin Traffik (2015) - Jacob Andries
- Too Late (2015) - Roger
- Confident (2015)
- Urge (2016) - Gerald
- The Hollow (2016) - Darryl Everett
- County Line (2017) - Clint Thorne
- American Dresser (2018) - Calhoun
- Alita: Battle Angel (2019) - McTeague
- Santa Fake (2019) - Jim Kelly
- Badland (2019) - Huxley Wainwright
- Intrigo: Samaria (2019) - Jacob
- Beckman (2020) - Philip
- A Bird Flew In (2021) - Peter
- The Long Night (2022) - Wayne
- Maneater (2022) - Professor Hoffman
- Battle For Saipan (2022) - Colonel Jake Carroll
- Among Wolves (2023) - Anthony
- Hypnotic (2023) - Carl
- Ruthless (2023) - Dale
- One Year Off (2023) - Ben Katsman
- Due Justice (2023) - Ellis
- Horizon: An American Saga – Chapter 1 (2024) - Tracker

=== Television ===
- One Life to Live (1984) - Gary Corelli
- The Execution of Raymond Graham (1985) - Raymond Graham
- Alfred Hitchcock Presents (1986) - Ray Lee
- Miami Vice (1986) - Eddie Kaye
- Curiosity Kills (1990) - Matthew Manus
- Parker Kane (1990) - Parker Kane
- Sketch Artist (1992) - Detective Jack Whitfield
- In the Company of Darkness (1993) - Will McCaid
- Blindsided (1993) - Frank McKenna
- Eye of the Wolf (1995) - Paul Weyman
- Sketch Artist II: Hands That See (1995) - Detective Jack Whitfield
- Virtual Seduction (1995) - Liam Bass
- The Marshal (1995) - Deputy Marshal Winston MacBride
- Every Woman's Dream (1996) - Mitch Parker
- Operation Delta Force (1997) - Captain Lang
- Perversions of Science (1997) - The Bearded Man
- On the Line (1997) - Detective Dan Collins
- Johnny 2.0 (1997) - Johnny Dalton
- The Seventh Scroll (1999) - Nick Harper
- Time Served (1999) - Patrick Berlington
- Nash Bridges (2001) - Nelson Collins
- Crossing Jordan (2004) - Bounty Hunter
- American Dreams (2004) - Stevens
- Icon (2005) - Harvey Blackledge
- Crimson Force (2005) - Older Man
- Locusts: The 8th Plague (2005) - Russ Snow
- Manticore (2005) - Major Spence Kramer
- Absolute Zero (2006) - Dr. David Kotzman
- The Eden Formula (2006) - Dr. Harrison Parker
- Psych (2008) - Dutch "The Clutch"
- The Cleaner (2008) - Quinn
- Criminal Minds (2008) - Leo Kane
- Lost (2008-2010) - Frank Lapidus
- Cold Case (2009) - Darren Malloy '09
- CSI: Miami (2009) - Allen Pierce
- Law & Order: LA (2011) - Terry Briggs
- Chuck (2011) - Karl Sneijder
- Workaholics (2011) - Doug
- Alien Tornado (2012) - Judd Walker
- Lake Effects (2012) - Ray
- Femme Fatales (2012) - Detective McAllister
- Common Law (2012) - Dan Noone
- Revolution (2012) - Ken "Hutch" Hutchinson
- The Sacred (2012) - George
- Hawaii Five-0 (2013) - Dr. Brian Stevens
- Under the Dome (2013) - Sheriff Howard "Duke" Perkins
- Rewind (2013) - Ellis
- Justified (2015) - Zachariah
- Grimm (2015) - Elder Bowden
- The Librarians (2015) - Isaac Stone
- Scorpion (2016) - Kenneth Dodd
- Atomic Shark (2016) - Rottger
- Legends of Tomorrow (2016) - Quentin Turnbull
- Training Day (2017) - Pike
- NCIS: New Orleans (2019) - Sheriff / Mayor
- Wu Assassins (2019) - Jack
- Fire Country (2023) - Walter Leone

=== Video games ===
- Marvel's Deadpool VR (2025) - Flag-Smasher
