= Cycloamylose =

Cycloamyloses are cyclic α-1,4 linked glucans comprising dozens or hundreds of glucose units. Chemically they are similar to the much smaller cyclodextrins, which are typically composed of 6, 7 or 8 glucose units.

Cycloamylose comprising 26 glucose units

== Discovery ==
Cycloamyloses were discovered as a result of studies of the function of 4-α-glucanotransferase, also known as disproportionating enzyme or D-enzyme (EC 2.4.1.25) isolated from potato.

== Synthesis ==
Upon incubation of D-enzyme with high molecular weight amylose, a product was obtained with decreased ability to form a blue complex with iodine, without reducing or non-reducing ends, and resistant to hydrolysis by glucoamylase (an exoamylase). Takaha and Smith deduced that the product was a cyclic polymer, which they confirmed by mass spectrometry and acid hydrolysis, and showed that it comprised between 17 and several hundred glucose units. It was subsequently shown that D-enzyme could create complex cycloglucans from amylopectin. Similar 4-α-glucanotransferases from bacteria and other organisms have also been shown to produce cycloglucans upon incubation with amylose or amylopectin.

== Structure ==
While the structures of cyclodextrins are planar circles, the structure of cycloamyloses with 10 to 14 glucose units were determined to be circular with strain-induced band-flips and kinks. In contrast the structure of a larger cycloamylose with 26 glucose units was determined to comprise two short left-handed V-amylose helices in antiparallel arrangement.

== Applications ==
Cycloamyloses contain cavities in the helices which are capable of accommodating guest molecules, which suggested applications in chemical technologies. Cycloamylose is used in artificial chaperone technology for the refolding of denatured proteins. Cycloglucans have physicochemical properties that make them useful in food and manufacturing.
