= Chris J. Leaver =

Chris Leaver CBE FRS FRSE MAE
- Born: Christopher John Leaver; 31 May 1942 (age 83)
- Education: Lyme Regis Grammar School
- Alma mater: Imperial College London (BSc, PhD)
- Awards: EMBO Membership (1982); Fulbright Scholarship (1966)
- Scientific career
- Fields: Biochemistry; Plant physiology Molecular biology
- Institutions: University of Oxford; Purdue University; University of Edinburgh
- Thesis: The correlation between nucleic acid synthesis and induced enzyme activity in plant tissue slices (1966)
- Doctoral students: Ian A. Graham; Steven A. Hill
- Website: www.sjc.ox.ac.uk/discover/people/christopher-leaver

Christopher John Leaver CBE FRS FRSE MAE (born 31 May 1942) is an Emeritus Professorial Fellow of St John's College, Oxford who served as Sibthorpian Professor in the Department of Plant Sciences at the University of Oxford from 1990 to 2007.

== Education ==
Leaver was educated at Lyme Regis Grammar School and Imperial College London where he was awarded a Bachelor of Science degree (first class) followed by a PhD in plant physiology in 1966.

== Career and research ==
Leaver's area of expertise is in plant biochemistry, development, plant physiology and signalling; before his current positions, he has at the Department of Botany and Plant Pathology at Purdue University and the University of Edinburgh. During his career, Leaver held the following positions:

- Botanist on the Imperial College Hornsund expedition, Spitzbergen, 1962 and Beerenberg expedition, Jan Mayen, 1963
- Fulbright Scholar, Purdue University, West Lafayette, Indiana, United States, 1966–68
- Lecturer at the University of Edinburgh 1969–80, promoted to Reader in 1980
- Science and Engineering Research Council (SERC) senior research fellow 1985–90
- Professor of Plant Molecular Biology 1986–1990
- University of Oxford Sibthorpian Professor of Plant Science, 1990–2007
- Head of the department of Plant Sciences 1991–2007
- Fellow of St John's College, Oxford 1990–
- Emeritus Professor of Plant Science, University of Oxford 2008–

=== Awards and honours ===
Leaver was elected a Fellow of the Royal Society (FRS) in 1986. His nomination reads:

Distinguished for his contributions to unravelling the role of nucleic acids in the development of higher plants. Leaver was the first person to isolate nucleic acids from higher plants in 1964, and produced the first description of the pathway of cytoplasmic ribosomal RNA synthesis. He discovered a novel species of 4.5S RNA in chloroplast ribosomes, and with W, Bottomley developed the coupled transcription-translation system now used in the analysis of chloroplast DNA. He established that the synthesis of glyoxysomal enzymes in cucumber seedlings is under transcriptional control. His more recent and innovative work concerns the structure, information content and expression of the plant mitochondrial genome, a field he has pioneered. He was the first to isolate plant mitochondrial ribosomes, establish their unique RNA composition, and develop the standard system now used for protein synthesis by isolated plant mitochondria. His work has produced strong evidence linking the agriculturally important trait of cytoplasmic male sterility in maize and sorghum with mutations in the mitochondrial genome which lead to the production of variant polypeptides. As well as isolating several protein-encoding plant mitochondrial genes, he has identified, cloned and sequenced the first nuclear gene for a plant mitochondrial protein.

Leaver was also awarded EMBO Membership in 1982, elected a member of the Academia Europaea in 1989 and appointed Commander of the British Empire (CBE) in the 2000 New Year Honours.

== Personal life ==
Leaver's Who's Who entry lists his recreations as “walking and talking in Upper Coquetdale” in Northumberland.
