= 4-alpha-glucanotransferase =

Class of enzymes

Identifiers
- EC no.: 2.4.1.25
- CAS no.: 9032-09-1

Databases
- BRENDA: enzyme data
- ExPASy: NiceZyme view
- KEGG: enzyme entry
- MetaCyc: metabolic pathway
- Rhea: reactions
- PDB structures: RCSB PDB PDBe PDBsum
- Gene Ontology: AmiGO / QuickGO
Search
- PMC: articles
- PubMed: articles
- NCBI: proteins

In enzymology, a 4-alpha-glucanotransferase (EC 2.4.1.25) is an enzyme that catalyzes a chemical reaction that transfers a segment of a 1,4-alpha-D-glucan to a new position in an acceptor carbohydrate, which may be glucose or a 1,4-alpha-D-glucan.

This enzyme belongs to the family of glycosyltransferases, specifically the hexosyltransferases. The systematic name of this enzyme class is 1,4-alpha-D-glucan:1,4-alpha-D-glucan 4-alpha-D-glycosyltransferase. Other names in common use include disproportionating enzyme, dextrin glycosyltransferase, D-enzyme, debranching enzyme maltodextrin glycosyltransferase, amylomaltase, and dextrin transglycosylase. This enzyme participates in starch and sucrose metabolism in plants. Studies of the enzyme from potato led to the discovery of cycloamylose.

== Structural studies ==
As of late 2007, 14 structures have been solved for this class of enzymes, with PDB accession codes PDB: 1CWY, PDB: 1ESW, PDB: 1FP8, PDB: 1FP9, PDB: 1K1W, PDB: 1K1X, PDB: 1K1Y, PDB: 1LWH, PDB: 1LWJ, PDB: 1TZ7, PDB: 1X1N, PDB: 2OWC, PDB: 2OWW, and PDB: 2OWX.
