= Adam Stephen Kelly =

British director and screenwriter

- Born: 16 July 1990 (age 35); Shoreham-by-Sea, England, UK
- Occupations: Film director, screenwriter, film producer
- Years active: 2009–present

Adam Stephen Kelly (born 16 July 1990) is a British director, screenwriter, producer and journalist.

== Biography ==
Adam was first published at age 16 while attending Steyning Grammar School, West Sussex, contributing articles to his local newspaper. A handful of years later he was an established and prolific film critic, writing for the likes of Ain't It Cool News. As he continued to write about cinema, Adam changed direction and decided to apply his knowledge to the making of films instead, producing a number of independent features in the years before his award-winning directorial debut, Done In, wowed international critics ahead of its world premiere at the Cannes Film Festival in 2014. The film, which starred Guy Henry, was released in June 2015 to further acclaim via Crypt TV, the genre movie network founded and curated by renowned filmmaker Eli Roth.

Following the success of Done In, Adam returned to the director's chair in April 2015 on the crime thriller Kill Kane, starring Vinnie Jones. He continues his work in the field of journalism as an occasional contributor to Rolling Stone and GQ.

Adam is currently the Senior Vice President of Shogun Films.

== Filmography (as writer and director) ==
- Done In (2014)
- Kill Kane (2016)

== Filmography (as writer) ==
- Nemesis (2021)

== Filmography (as producer) ==
- Incest Death Squad 2 (2010)
- Mediatrix (2011)
- I.D.S. Rising (2012)
- Top Dog (2014)
- The Girl Who Played with the Dead (2014)
- We Still Kill the Old Way (2014)
- Age of Kill (2015)
- Bonded by Blood 2 (2017)
- We Still Steal the Old Way (2017)
- Eat Local (2017)
- Aura (2018)
- The Krays: Dead Man Walking (2018)
- Pentagram (2018)
- Nemesis(2021)
- Renegades (2022)
