= Measle and the Dragodon =

2004 novel by Ian Ogilvy

- First edition cover
- Author: Ian Ogilvy
- Illustrator: Chris Mould
- Language: English
- Series: Measle Stubbs
- Genre: Children's fantasy
- Publisher: Oxford University Press
- Publication date: 2004
- Publication place: United Kingdom
- Media type: Print
- Pages: 352 pp
- ISBN: 978-0-19-271953-9
- OCLC: 59512793
- Preceded by: Measle and the Wrathmonk
- Followed by: Measle and the Mallockee

Measle and the Dragodon is a children's novel written by Ian Ogilvy and illustrated by Chris Mould. It is the second book in the Measle Stubbs series. The novel was first published in 2004 by OUP in the UK and HarperCollins in the US. It was reissued by OUP in 2010 under the title The Funfair of Fear!

The author describes the setting as "a deserted theme park at night in the pouring rain. It’s very spooky and creepy and Measle’s running around in the dark in this enormous great theme park dodging these seven Wrathmonks."

== Plot summary ==
The novel is about a boy called Measle who has been recently reunited with his parents, Sam and Lee Stubbs. On a day out they visit the Isle of Smiles, a theme park, and from then on things take a turn for the worse. Lee is captured by wrathmonks (warlocks that have gone mad) and taken to the Isle of Smiles. Sam has his memory wiped, and Measle and his dog, Tinker, are left to their own devices to find and rescue their parents. Once Measle reaches the Isle of Smiles, the wrathmonks cast a spell that causes all the creatures in the theme park to come alive and attempt to kill him. After he has successfully run away from the creatures, the wrathmonks catch him and want to kill him, but their leader, a dragodon, orders them to take him to a ride which leads into the dragon's lair. After a fight with the dragon and the dragodon, Measle and his mother escape and get back to their house where after a short fight the wrathmonks are defeated.

== Characters ==
- Measle Stubbs/Sam Lee Stubbs - The main character in the book. A thin 10-year-old boy with a funny haircut. His nickname 'Measle' is an anagram of his actual name Sam Lee, invented by his former guardian, Basil Tramplebone.
- Tinker - Measle's dog, who has helped him on a number of occasions.
- The Dragodon - Ancient rider of the dragons, the last one left.
- Arcturion - A dragon who was trapped in the Isle of Smiles for many years after being injured in a battle.
- Sam Stubbs - Measle's dad. He is also a wizard, although not an incredibly powerful one.
- Lee Stubbs - Measle's mom. She is a manafount, which means that she, although unable to do spells herself, has an unlimited supply of mana which is what magicians use to cast spells. This mana can be tapped into either by her husband holding hands with her or by her being eaten.
- Griswold Gristle - In the first book he was Basil's bank manager, a short wrathmonk.
