= The Spoils of Poynton (TV series) =

British television series

- Genre: Period drama
- Based on: The Spoils of Poynton by Henry James
- Written by: Denis Constanduros
- Directed by: Peter Sasdy
- Starring: Pauline Jameson; Gemma Jones; Ian Ogilvy; Diane Fletcher
- Country of origin: United Kingdom
- Original language: English
- No. of series: 1
- No. of episodes: 4

Production
- Producer: Martin Lisemore
- Running time: 45 minutes
- Production company: BBC

Original release
- Network: BBC Two
- Release: 13 December 1970 – 3 January 1971

The Spoils of Poynton is a British television drama series which first aired on BBC 2 between 13 December 1970 and 3 January 1971 in four episodes. It is an adaptation of the 1897 novel The Spoils of Poynton by Henry James and retains the book's late Victorian setting. It was one of a number of adaptations of works by James produced by the BBC during the period.

== Cast ==
- Pauline Jameson as Mrs. Gereth
- Gemma Jones as Fleda Vetch
- Ian Ogilvy as Owen Gereth
- Diane Fletcher as Mona Brigstock
- June Ellis as Mrs. Brigstock
- Polly Adams as Maggie
- Robin Parkinson as Arthur
- Mary Healey as Annie
- Sian Davies as Williams
- Jane Walker as Thomson

== Bibliography ==
- Baskin, Ellen. Serials on British Television, 1950-1994. Scolar Press, 1996.
- Leggott, James & Taddeo, Julie Anne (ed.) Upstairs and Downstairs: British Costume Drama Television from The Forsyte Saga to Downton Abbey. Bloomsbury Publishing, 2014.
