= Dani Dyer =

English television personality and actress (born 1996)

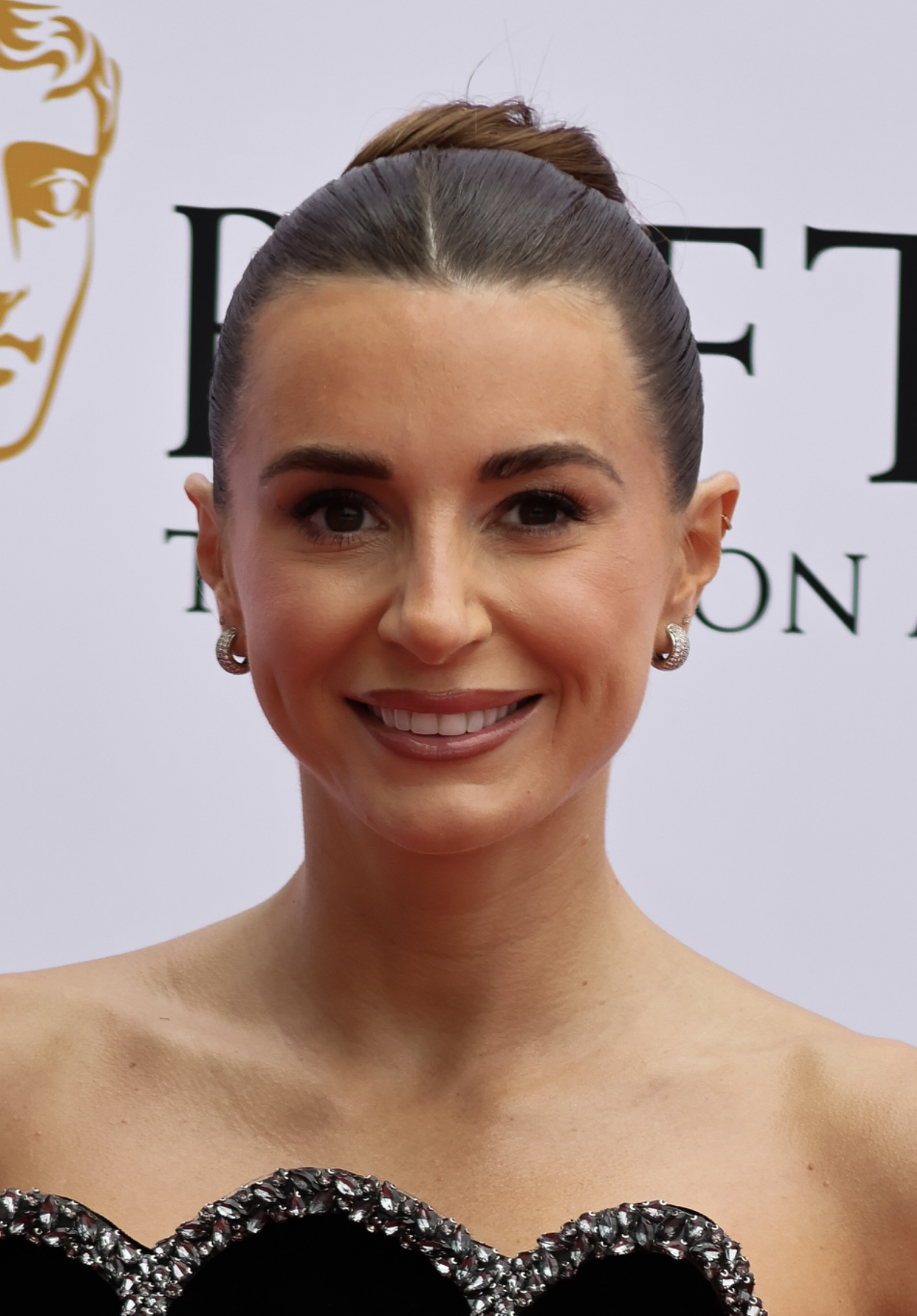
- Dyer in 2026
- Born: Dani Charlotte Dyer; 8 August 1996 (age 30); Newham, London, England
- Occupations: Television personality; actress
- Years active: 2006–present
- Spouse: Jarrod Bowen (m. 2025)
- Children: 3
- Father: Danny Dyer
- Relatives: Sam Bowen (father-in-law)

Dani Charlotte Dyer-Bowen (born 8 August 1996) is an English television personality and actress. In 2018, she appeared on Survival of the Fittest, and later that year won the fourth series of Love Island alongside Jack Fincham. Since then, she has co-presented the MTV series True Love or True Lies alongside her father Danny Dyer, as well as co-hosting a podcast called Sorted with the Dyers with him. In 2026, she took part in Celebrity SAS: Who Dares Wins and is taking part in the twenty-fourth series of Strictly Come Dancing, after withdrawing from the previous series due to injury.

== Early life ==
Dyer was born on 8 August 1996 in the London Borough of Newham to mother Joanne Mas, who is half Spanish, and father Danny Dyer. She has a younger sister and a younger brother, and attended Roding Valley High School in Loughton, Essex. Dyer worked as a barmaid before appearing on television.

== Career ==
Dyer made her professional screen debut as an extra in the 2006 film The Other Half alongside her father. She also appeared as an extra in other films starring her father, including Doghouse (2009), Run for Your Wife (2012) and Vendetta (2013). The producer of Vendetta stated that she "absolutely blew away" the crew. She then independently appeared in films including We Still Kill the Old Way (2014), Age of Kill (2015) and Bonded by Blood 2 (2017). In 2018, she was announced as a cast member for the ITV2 reality series Survival of the Fittest, but withdrew from the series on the second day after dislocating her shoulder. Later that year, she competed in the fourth series of ITV2's Love Island. She won the series alongside Jack Fincham with 79.66% of the final vote. Following their Love Island win, Dyer and Fincham starred in the three-part ITVBe reality series Jack & Dani: Life After Love Island. In 2019, she began appearing as a guest reporter on The One Show, and in 2020, she launched a range of lip products with Vaseline. Later that year, she began co-hosting a podcast with her father, titled Sorted with the Dyers. In June 2021, she made a guest appearance in the BBC soap opera EastEnders as a taxi driver named Jeanette and appeared alongside her father who portrayed series regular Mick Carter.

In 2025, Dyer was announced as a contestant on the twenty-third series of Strictly Come Dancing. Paired with professional Nikita Kuzmin, she later withdrew prior to the first live show after sustaining a fractured ankle during rehearsals. As a result, she appeared only in the launch show dance. In 2026, Dyer took part in the celebrity version of the Channel 4 show SAS: Who Dares Wins, finishing as joint winner alongside Gabby Allen and Emily Seebohm. Her return to Strictly Come Dancing was announced in 2026, for the twenty-fourth series.

== Personal life ==
Dyer was in a relationship with Sammy Kimmence before appearing on Love Island. While on the series in 2018, Dyer was in a relationship with Jack Fincham; the pair split later that year. Dyer then rekindled her relationship with Kimmence. On 23 January 2021, she gave birth to a son. She reportedly split from Kimmence after he was jailed for 3½ years (serving 18 months) for scamming two elderly men out of £34,000.

On 27 December 2021, Dyer confirmed she was in a relationship with her former neighbour, West Ham United footballer Jarrod Bowen in an interview on The Lateish Show with Mo Gilligan. She gave birth to twin daughters on 22 May 2023. They announced their engagement on 21 July 2024 and married on 30 May 2025.

== Filmography ==
=== Film ===
Year	Title	Role	Notes
2006	The Other Half	Other England Fan	
2009	Doghouse	Ballerina	
2012	Run for Your Wife		Unnamed role
2013	Vendetta	Nikki	
2014	We Still Kill the Old Way	Lauren	
2015	Age of Kill	Joss Blake	
2016	Asylum	Mia	Short film
2017	Bonded by Blood 2	Elizabeth	
2018	Teen Spirit	TV Daughter	
2019	Watch What I Do	Charley	Short film
2019	Heckle	Lucy	feature film
2026	Shaun the Sheep: The Beast of Mossy Bottom	Influencer	Voice

=== Television ===
Year	Title	Roles
2018	Survival of the Fittest	Walked on Day 2
2018	Love Island	Series 4; winner
2018	Celebrity Gogglebox for SU2C	With Danny Dyer
2019	Jack & Dani: Life After Love Island	Main role; 3 episodes
2019–2020	The One Show	Guest reporter
2019	Kilimanjaro: The Bigger Red Nose Climb	Television special
2019	True Love or True Lies	Co-presenter
2021	EastEnders	Jeanette; Guest role
2023	Absolutely Dyer: Danny & Dani do Italy	Herself; with Danny Dyer
2023	Celebrity MasterChef	Contestant; Series 18
2023	Dani Dyer: Is This Anxiety?	Herself
2024	Celebrity Gogglebox	Series 6; with Danny Dyer
2025	Strictly Come Dancing	Contestant, series 23, launch show
2026	Celebrity SAS: Who Dares Wins	Series 8; joint winner alongside Gabby Allen and Emily Seebohm
2026	Strictly Come Dancing	Contestant, series 24
