= John Mills =

English actor (1908–2005)

Sir John Mills CBE
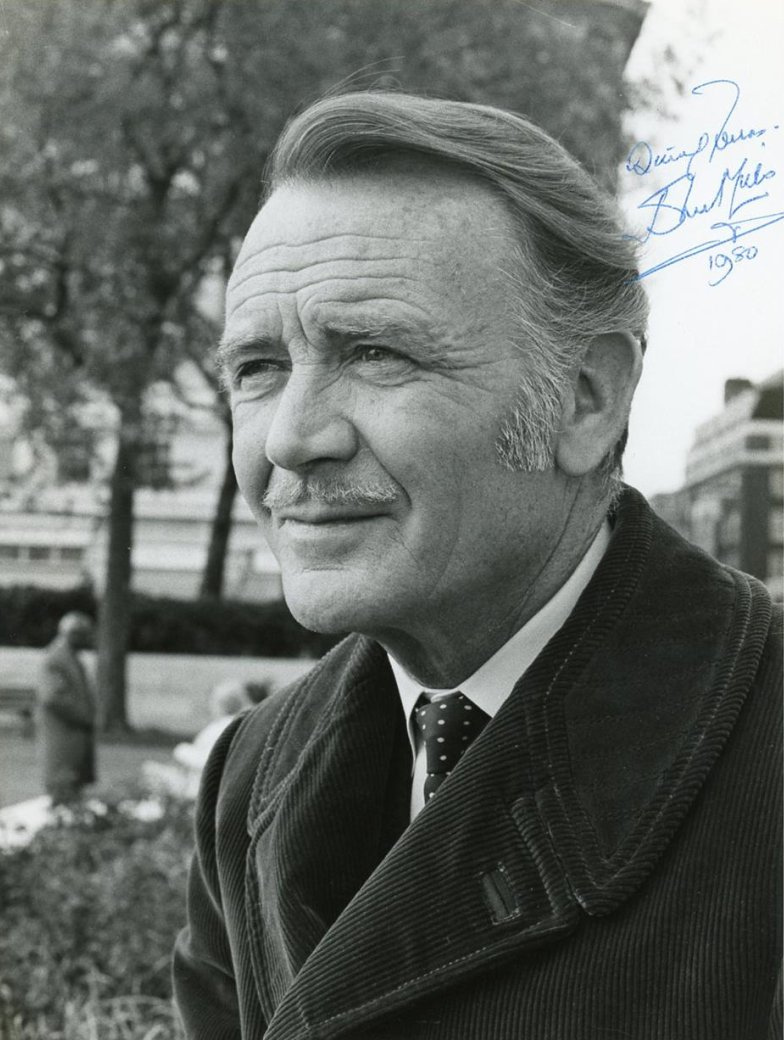
- Mills in Dundee and the Culhane (1967)
- Born: Lewis Ernest Watts Mills; 22 February 1908; North Elmham, Norfolk, England
- Died: 23 April 2005 (aged 97); Denham, Buckinghamshire, England
- Resting place: St Mary the Virgin Churchyard, Denham
- Occupation: Actor
- Years active: 1929–2005
- Known for: Ryan's Daughter; Tunes of Glory; Swiss Family Robinson; Great Expectations; The Vicious Circle; Ice Cold in Alex
- Spouses: Aileen Raymond (m. 1932; div. 1940) Mary Hayley Bell (m. 1941)
- Children: 3, including Juliet Mills and Hayley Mills
- Relatives: Annette Mills (sister); Crispian Mills (grandson); Molly Blake (niece); Susie Blake (great niece)

Sir John Mills (born Lewis Ernest Watts Mills; 22 February 1908 – 23 April 2005) was an English actor who appeared in more than 120 films in a career spanning seven decades. He excelled on camera as an appealing British everyman who often portrayed guileless, wounded war heroes. In 1971, he received the Academy Award for Best Supporting Actor for his performance in Ryan's Daughter.

For his work in film, Mills was knighted by Elizabeth II in 1976. In 2002, he received a BAFTA Fellowship from the British Academy of Film and Television Arts and was named a Disney Legend by The Walt Disney Company.

== Early life ==
Mills was born in North Elmham, Norfolk, the son of Edith Mills (née Baker), a theatre box office manager, and Lewis Mills, a mathematics teacher. Mills was born at Watts Naval School, where his father was a master. He spent his early years in the village of Belton where his father was the headmaster of the village school. He first felt the thrill of performing at a concert in the school hall when he was six years old. He then lived in a modest house on Gainsborough Road, Felixstowe, Suffolk, until 1929. His elder sister was Annette Mills, remembered as presenter of BBC Television's Muffin the Mule (1946–55).

He was educated at Balham Grammar School in London, Sir John Leman High School in Beccles and Norwich High School for Boys, where it is said that his initials can still be seen carved into the brickwork on the side of the building in Upper St Giles Street. Upon leaving school he worked as a clerk at a corn merchant's, R & W Paul & Sons, in Ipswich before finding employment in London as a commercial traveller for the Sanitas Disinfectant Company.

=== Military service ===
In September 1939, at the start of the Second World War, Mills enlisted in the British Army, joining the Royal Engineers. He was later commissioned as a Second Lieutenant, but in 1942 he received a medical discharge because of a stomach ulcer.

== Career ==
=== Early career ===
Mills took an early interest in acting, making his professional début at the London Hippodrome in The Five O'Clock Girl in 1929. He followed this with a cabaret act.

Mills then got a job with a theatrical company that toured India, China and the Far East performing a number of plays. Noël Coward saw him appear in a production of Journey's End in Singapore and wrote Mills a letter of introduction to use back in London.

On his return, Mills starred in The 1931 Revue, Coward's Cavalcade (1931) and the Coward revue Words and Music (1932).

He made his film debut in The Midshipmaid (1932). He also appeared in The Ghost Camera (1933) with Ida Lupino and Britannia of Billingsgate (1934).

Mills was promoted to leading roles in A Political Party (1934), a comedy. He was in a series of quota quickies: The River Wolves (1934); Those Were the Days (1934), the first film of Will Hay; The Lash (1934); Blind Justice (1934); Doctor's Orders (1934); and Car of Dreams (1935). He did Jill Darling (1934) on stage and was one of many names in Royal Cavalcade (1935).

=== "A" movies ===
Mills had the star role in an A film, Brown on Resolution (1935). It was back to quota quickies for Charing Cross Road (1935) and The First Offence (1936). He had another excellent part in an "A", playing Lord Guildford Dudley in Tudor Rose (1936). He did Aren't Men Beasts? (1936) on stage and worked for Hollywood director Raoul Walsh in O.H.M.S. (1937).

Mills starred in The Green Cockatoo (1937) directed by William Cameron Menzies. He appeared as Colley in the hugely popular 1939 film version of Goodbye, Mr Chips, opposite Robert Donat.

=== World War II ===
At the Old Vic he was in A Midsummer Night's Dream (1939), She Stoops to Conquer (1939) and Of Mice and Men (1939–40). He joined the army in 1939 but occasionally made films on leave. He went back to movies with Old Bill and Son (1940) and made Cottage to Let (1941), a war film for Anthony Asquith. Mills went back to supporting Will Hay in The Black Sheep of Whitehall (1942) and he was one of many names in the war film, The Big Blockade (1942).

He was in Men in Shadow (1942) on stage, written by his wife. He achieved acclaim for his performance as an able seaman in Noël Coward's In Which We Serve (1942), a huge hit. Mills had another good support role in The Young Mr. Pitt (1942) playing William Wilberforce opposite Robert Donat. He was invalided out of the army in 1942.

=== Stardom ===
Mills's climb to stardom began when he had the lead role in We Dive at Dawn (1943), a film directed by Asquith about submariners. He was top billed in This Happy Breed (1944), directed by David Lean and adapted from a Noël Coward play.

Also popular was Waterloo Road (1945), from Sidney Gilliat, in which Mills played a man who goes AWOL to retrieve his wife from a draft-dodger (played by Stewart Granger). Mills played a pilot in The Way to the Stars (1945), directed by Asquith from a script by Terence Rattigan, and another big hit in Britain. He did Duet for Two Hands (1945) on stage.

Mills had his greatest success to date as Pip in Great Expectations (1946), directed by David Lean. It was the third biggest hit at the British box office that year and Mills was voted the sixth most popular star.

Less successful critically and financially was So Well Remembered (1947) which used American writers and directors. The October Man (1947) was a mildly popular thriller from Roy Ward Baker.

Mills played the title role in Scott of the Antarctic (1948), a biopic of Captain Scott. It was the fourth-most-watched film of the year in Britain and Mills was voted the eighth-biggest star in an exhibitors' poll.

=== Producer ===
Mills turned producer with The History of Mr Polly (1949) from the novel by H. G. Wells. It was directed by Anthony Pelissier and Mills said it was his favourite film. Pelissier also made The Rocking Horse Winner (1949) which Mills produced; he also played a small role. More liked at the box office was a submarine drama, Morning Departure (1950), directed by Baker. By this stage his fee was a reported £20,000 a film.

=== Career slump ===
After Morning Departure Mills took almost two years off. The films he made on his return were not popular: a thriller, Mr Denning Drives North (1951); The Gentle Gunman (1952), where he and Dirk Bogarde played IRA gunmen for Basil Dearden; and The Long Memory (1953), a thriller from Robert Hamer.

=== Popularity revival ===
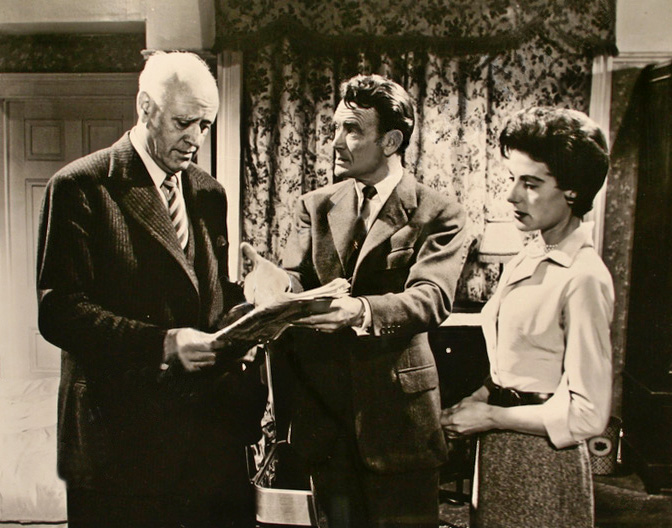
Mills (middle) with Alastair Sim and Yvonne Mitchell in Escapade (1955)

Mills had his first hit in a number of years with Hobson's Choice (1954), directed by Lean. He appeared in the war film The Colditz Story (1955).

Mills played a supporting role in a movie for MGM, The End of the Affair (1955), with Deborah Kerr and Van Johnson. More liked in Britain was another war story, Above Us the Waves (1955); this was the sixth-most-popular film at the British box office that year, and it helped Mills become the fifth-most-popular star in the country.

After Escapade (1955), Mills made the popular military comedy The Baby and the Battleship (1956), one of the biggest hits of 1956. Also on that list was another Mills comedy, It's Great to Be Young (1956).

Mills had a key support role as a peasant in War and Peace (1956) and made a cameo in Around the World in 80 Days (1956).

Mills appeared in the thrillers: Town on Trial (1957) directed by John Guillermin and The Vicious Circle (1957). More popular with the public were the war films: Dunkirk (1958), the second-most-popular film of the year in Britain; Ice Cold in Alex (1958), directed by J. Lee Thompson; and I Was Monty's Double'(1958), directed by Guillermin.

In the 1959 crime drama Tiger Bay, directed by Thompson, Mills played a police detective investigating a murder that a young girl has witnessed. His daughter Hayley was cast, and earned excellent reviews.

Mills went to Australia to play a cane cutter in the Hollywood financed Summer of the Seventeenth Doll (1959). The movie was poorly received critically and commercially.

Better received was Tunes of Glory (1960), a military drama directed by Ronald Neame co-starring Alec Guinness. Mills's performance earned him a Best Actor Award at the Venice Film Festival.

Walt Disney saw Tiger Bay and offered Hayley Mills the lead role in Pollyanna (1960). Disney also offered John Mills the lead in the adventure film Swiss Family Robinson (1960), which was a huge hit. He did Ross (1960–61) on stage.

The Rank Organisation insisted Mills play the role of the priest in The Singer Not the Song (1961) opposite Dirk Bogarde. Mills and Baker reteamed on an interracial drama, Flame in the Streets (1961), and an Italian-British war film, The Valiant (1962).

Mills did a comedy with James Mason, Tiara Tahiti (1962). He had a support role in The Chalk Garden (1964) starring Hayley.

After a cameo on the war film Operation Crossbow (1965), Mills made a third film with his daughter, The Truth About Spring (1965). He had a cameo in King Rat (1965) for Bryan Forbes, who then directed Mills in The Wrong Box (1966). Mills played Hayley's father-in-law on screen in The Family Way (1966). He then directed her in Sky West and Crooked (1966) from a script written by his wife.

He was the subject of This Is Your Life on two occasions, firstly in 1960 when he was surprised by Eamonn Andrews outside Pinewood Studios, and again in 1983 when Andrews surprised him on the stage of London's Wyndham's Theatre at the curtain call of the play Little Lies.

=== Character actor ===
Mills began to move into character roles, supporting Hugh O'Brian in Africa Texas Style (1967) and Rod Taylor in Chuka (1967). He went to Italy for a giallo, A Black Veil for Lisa (1968) and played William Hamilton in Emma Hamilton (1968).

Mills had a cameo in Oh! What a Lovely War (1969) for director Richard Attenborough and supported Mark Lester (though he was top billed) in Run Wild, Run Free (1969). He went to Australia to star in a convict drama, Adam's Woman (1970).

For his role as the village idiot in Ryan's Daughter (1970)—a complete departure from his usual style—Mills won a Best Supporting Actor Oscar.

He was in Dulcima (1971), then had support roles in Young Winston (1972) for Attenborough, Lady Caroline Lamb (1972) and Oklahoma Crude (1973). On stage he did Veterans at the Royal Court, At the End of the Day (1973), The Good Companions (1974), Great Expectations (1975) and Separate Tables (1977).

Also on the small screen, in 1974 he starred as Captain Tommy "The Elephant" Devon in the six-part television drama series The Zoo Gang, about a group of former underground freedom fighters from the Second World War, alongside Brian Keith, Lilli Palmer and Barry Morse.

In the late 1970s Mills could still get lead roles in films, as shown by The "Human" Factor (1975), Trial by Combat (1976) and The Devil's Advocate (1977). He had filmed supporting roles in The Big Sleep and The Thirty Nine Steps (both 1978).

His most famous television role was probably as the title character in Quatermass for ITV in 1979. He followed this with a sitcom in Young at Heart (1980–82).

On the big screen he was now mainly playing upper-crust types as in Zulu Dawn (1979), Gandhi (1982) and Sahara (1983). He performed Goodbye Mr Chips on stage (1982) followed by Little Lies (1983).

=== Later career ===
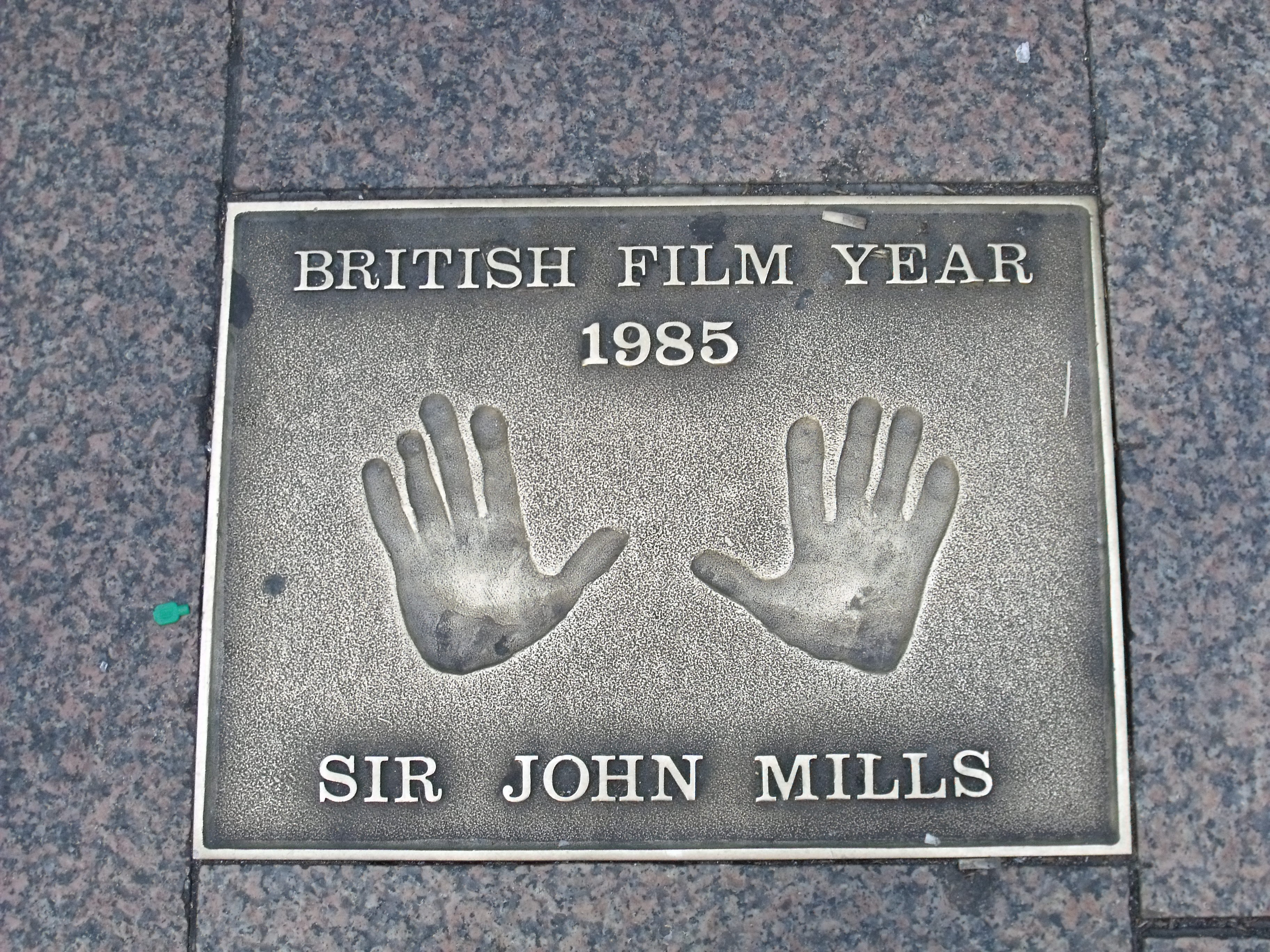
Mills handprints from 1985 at Leicester Square, London

In 1986 he did The Petition at the National and the following year did Pygmalion on Broadway. He provided a voice for When the Wind Blows (1986) and supported Madonna in Who's That Girl (1987). His best roles were on TV in Harnessing Peacocks (1993) and Martin Chuzzlewit (1994). Mills also starred as Gus: The Theatre Cat in the filmed version of the musical Cats in 1998.

In 2000, Mills released his extensive home cine-film footage in a documentary film entitled Sir John Mills' Moving Memories, with interviews with Mills, his children Hayley, Juliet and Jonathan and Richard Attenborough. The film was produced and written by Jonathan Mills, directed and edited by Marcus Dillistone, and features behind the scenes footage and stories from films such as Ice Cold in Alex and Dunkirk. In addition the film also includes home footage of many of Mills's friends and fellow cast members including Laurence Olivier, Harry Andrews, Walt Disney, David Niven, Dirk Bogarde, Rex Harrison and Tyrone Power. He portrayed a charming old gent as head of an art museum in 1997's Bean. Mills's last cinema appearance was playing a tramp in Lights 2 (directed by Marcus Dillistone); the cinematographer was Jack Cardiff. They had last worked together on Scott of the Antarctic in 1948.

== Personal life and death ==
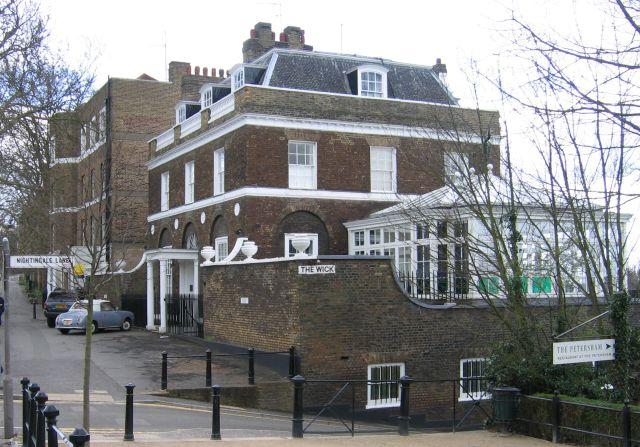
The Wick on Richmond Hill in Richmond, Greater London, was the family home for many years.

His first wife was the actress Aileen Raymond, They were married in 1932 and divorced in 1940. Raymond later became the mother of actor Ian Ogilvy.

His second wife was the dramatist Mary Hayley Bell. Their marriage, on 16 January 1941, lasted for 64 years until his death in 2005. They were married in a rushed civil ceremony, because of the war; it was not until sixty years later that they were married in a church. They lived in The Wick, Richmond, London, for many years. They sold the house to musician Ronnie Wood in 1971 and in 1975, moved to Hills House, Denham, Buckinghamshire.

Mills and Bell had two daughters, Juliet, star of television's Nanny and the Professor and Hayley, a Disney child star who appeared in Pollyanna, The Parent Trap and Whistle Down the Wind. They had one son, a screenwriter. In 1947, Mills appeared with his daughters in the film So Well Remembered. The three also appeared together decades later, on an episode of ABC's The Love Boat. Mills's grandson by Hayley, Crispian Mills, is a musician, best known for his work with the raga rock group Kula Shaker.

In the years leading up to John Mills's death, he appeared on television only on special occasions, his sight having failed almost completely by 1992. After that, his film roles were cameos. He wrote an autobiography entitled Up in the Clouds, Gentlemen Please, which was published in 1980 and revised in 2001.

Mills died on 23 April 2005 in Denham, Buckinghamshire, aged 97, following a stroke. Lady Mills died on 1 December 2005. They are buried in St Mary the Virgin Churchyard, Denham, Buckinghamshire.

== Honours ==
Mills was appointed a Commander of the Order of the British Empire (CBE) in 1960. In 1976 he was knighted by Queen Elizabeth II.

For his role in the film Ryan's Daughter (1970) he won a Best Supporting Actor Oscar.

In 1999, at 91 years of age, Mills became the oldest joining member of the entertainment charitable fraternity, the Grand Order of Water Rats.

In 2002, he received a Fellowship of the British Academy of Film and Television Arts (BAFTA), their highest award, and was named a Disney Legend by the Walt Disney Company.

== Filmography ==
=== Film ===
Year	Title	Role	Notes
1932	The Midshipmaid	Golightly	
1933	The Ghost Camera	Ernest Elton	
1933	Britannia of Billingsgate	Fred Bolton	
1934	A Political Party	Tony Smithers	
1934	The River Wolves	Peter Farrell	
1934	Those Were the Days	Bobby Poskett	
1934	The Lash	Arthur Haughton	
1934	Blind Justice	Ralph Summers	
1934	Doctor's Orders	Ronnie Blake	
1935	Car of Dreams	Robert Miller	
1935	Royal Cavalcade	Young Enlistee	
1935	Brown on Resolution	Albert Brown	(later reissued in the UK as Forever England)
1935	Charing Cross Road	Tony	
1936	The First Offence	Johnnie Penrose	alternative title Bad Blood
1936	Tudor Rose	Lord Guilford Dudley	Released as Nine Days a Queen in USA
1937	O.H.M.S.	Cpl. Bert Dawson	
1937	The Green Cockatoo	Jim Connor	
1939	Goodbye, Mr Chips	Peter Colley – as a Young Man	
1941	Old Bill and Son	Young Bill Busby	
1941	Cottage to Let	Flt. Lieutenant Perry	
1942	The Black Sheep of Whitehall	Bobby Jessop	
1942	The Big Blockade	Tom	
1942	In Which We Serve	Ordinary Seaman Blake	(with daughter Juliet Mills)
1942	The Young Mr. Pitt	William Wilberforce	
1943	We Dive at Dawn	Lt. Taylor, R.N.	
1944	This Happy Breed	Billy Mitchell	
1944	Victory Wedding	Bill Clark	Short
1945	Waterloo Road	Jim Colter	
1945	The Way to the Stars	Peter Penrose	
1946	Great Expectations	Pip	
1947	So Well Remembered	George Boswell	(with daughters Juliet Mills and Hayley Mills)
1947	The October Man	Jim Ackland	
1948	Scott of the Antarctic	Captain Scott; Captain R.F. Scott R.N.	
1949	The History of Mr Polly	Alfred Polly	
1949	The Rocking Horse Winner	Bassett	(also produced)
1950	Morning Departure	Lt. Commander Armstrong	
1951	Mr Denning Drives North	Tom Denning	
1952	The Gentle Gunman	Terrence Sullivan	
1953	The Long Memory	Phillip Davidson	
1954	Hobson's Choice	Willie Mossop	Nominated-BAFTA Award for Best Actor in a Leading Role
1955	The Colditz Story	Pat Reid	
1955	The End of the Affair	Albert Parkis	
1955	Above Us the Waves	Commander Fraser	
1955	Escapade	John Hampden	
1956	The Baby and the Battleship	Puncher Roberts	
1956	War and Peace	Platon Karataev	
1956	Around the World in 80 Days	London Carriage Driver	
1956	It's Great to Be Young	Mr Dingle	
1957	Town on Trial	Supt Mike Halloran	
1957	The Vicious Circle	Dr Howard Latimer	
1958	Dunkirk	Corporal Binns	
1958	Ice Cold in Alex	Captain Anson RASC	
1958	I Was Monty's Double	Major Harvey	(also titled Hell, Heaven or Hoboken)
1959	Tiger Bay	Superintendent Graham	(with daughter Hayley Mills)
1959	Summer of the Seventeenth Doll	Barney	(also titled Season of Passion)
1960	Tunes of Glory	Lt. Col. Basil Barrow (Battalion Commander)	Volpi Cup for Best Actor; Nominated-BAFTA Award for Best Actor in a Leading Role
1960	Swiss Family Robinson	William Robinson	
1961	The Singer Not the Song	Father Michael Keogh	
1961	The Parent Trap	Mitch Evers's Golf Caddy	Uncredited
1961	Flame in the Streets	Jacko Palmer	
1962	The Valiant	Captain Morgan	
1962	Tiara Tahiti	Lt. Col. Clifford Southey	
1964	The Chalk Garden	Maitland	(with daughter Hayley Mills)
1965	Operation Crossbow	Gen. Boyd	
1965	The Truth About Spring	Tommy Tyler	(with daughter Hayley Mills)
1965	King Rat	Smedley – Taylor	
1966	The Wrong Box	Masterman Finsbury	
1966	The Family Way	Ezra Fitton	(with daughter Hayley Mills); Silver Shell for Best Actor (tied with Maurice Ronet for The Champagne Murders) at the San Sebastián International Film Festival
1967	Africa Texas Style	Wing Commander Hayes	
1967	Chuka	Colonel Stuart Valois	
1968	A Black Veil for Lisa	Inspector Franz Bulon	
1968	Emma Hamilton	Sir William Hamilton	
1969	Oh! What a Lovely War	Field Marshal Sir Douglas Haig	
1969	Run Wild, Run Free	The Moorman	
1970	Adam's Woman	Sir Phillip MacDonald	
1970	Ryan's Daughter	Michael	Academy Award for Best Supporting Actor; Golden Globe Award for Best Supporting Actor – Motion Picture; Kansas City Film Critics Circle Award for Best Supporting Actor; Nominated-BAFTA Award for Best Supporting Actor
1971	Dulcima	Mr Parker	
1972	Young Winston	General Kitchener	
1972	Lady Caroline Lamb	Canning	
1973	Oklahoma Crude	Cleon Doyle	
1975	The Human Factor	Mike McAllister	
1976	Trial by Combat	Colonel Bertie Cook	(also titled A Dirty Knight's Work)
1977	The Devil's Advocate	Blaise Meredith	
1978	The Big Sleep	Inspector Jim Carson	
1978	The Thirty Nine Steps	Scudder	
1979	The Quatermass Conclusion	Professor Bernard Quatermass	
1979	Zulu Dawn	Sir Henry Bartle Frere	
1982	Gandhi	The Viceroy Baron Chelmsford	
1983	Sahara	Cambridge	
1986	When the Wind Blows	Jim	Voice
1987	Who's That Girl	Montgomery Bell	(credited as Sir John Mills)
1993	The Big Freeze	Dapper man	
1994	Deadly Advice	Jack the Ripper	
1995	The Grotesque	Sir Edward Cleghorn	(also titled Gentleman Don't Eat Poets)
1996	Hamlet	Old Norway	
1997	Bean	Chairman	(credited as Sir John Mills)
1998	Cats	Gus the Theater Cat	
2003	Bright Young Things	Gentleman	
2005	Lights2	The Tramp	Cinematographer Jack Cardiff (previously worked on Scott of The Antarctic), (final film role)

=== Television ===
Year	Title	Role	Notes
1967	Dundee and the Culhane	Dundee	13 episodes
1974	The Zoo Gang	Thomas 'The Elephant' Devon	6 episodes
1978	Dr. Strange	Thomas Lindmer	TV movie
1979	Quatermass	Professor Bernard Quatermass	4 episodes
1980–1982	Tales of the Unexpected	William Perkins/The Umbrella Man/Sam Morrissey	3 episodes
1980–1982	Young at Heart	Albert Collyer	18 episodes
1982	The Adventures of Little Lord Fauntleroy	The Earl of Dorincort	TV movie
1984	The Masks of Death	Dr Watson	TV movie
1985	A Woman of Substance	Henry Rossiter	3 episodes
1985	Murder with Mirrors	Lewis Serrocold	TV movie
1985	Edge of the Wind	General Blair	TV play
1987	The Dame Edna Experience		Season 1, Episode 6 (as himself)
1989	A Tale of Two Cities	Jarvis Lorry	2 episodes
1993	Harnessing Peacocks	Bernard Quigley	TV movie
1994	Martin Chuzzlewit	Mr Chuffey	3 episodes, TV Mini-series

== Stage appearances ==
Year	Title	Theatre
1929	The Five O'Clock Girl	London Hippodrome
1930	Charley's Aunt	New Theatre
1931	The 1931 Revue	London Pavilion
1931	London Wall	Duke of York's Theatre
1931	Cavalcade	Theatre Royal Drury Lane
1932	Words and Music	Adelphi Theatre
1933	Give Me a Ring	London Hippodrome
1934	Jill Darling	Saville Theatre
1936	Red Night	Queen's Theatre
1936	Aren't Men Beasts!	Strand Theatre
1937	Floodlight	Saville Theatre
1937	Talk of the Devil	Piccadilly Theatre
1938	Pelissier's Follies of 1938	Saville Theatre
1938	A Midsummer Night's Dream	The Old Vic
1938	She Stoops to Conquer	The Old Vic
1939	We at the Crossroads	Globe Theatre
1939	Of Mice and Men	Gate Theatre/Apollo Theatre
1942	Men in Shadow	Lyric Theatre
1945	Duet for Two Hands	Vaudeville Theatre
1950	The Damascus Blade	UK Tour
1950	Top of the Ladder	St James's Theatre
1951	Figure of Fun	Aldwych Theatre
1953	The Uninvited Guest	St James's Theatre
1954	Charley's Aunt	New Theatre/Strand Theatre
1961	Ross	Eugene O'Neill Theatre/Hudson Theatre, New York City
1963	Powers of Persuasion	Garrick Theatre
1972	Veterans	Royal Court Theatre
1973	At the End of the Day	Savoy Theatre
1974	The Good Companions	Her Majesty's Theatre
1975	Great Expectations	UK Tour/O'Keefe Centre, Toronto
1977	Separate Tables	Apollo Theatre
1982	Goodbye, Mr Chips	Chichester Festival Theatre
1983	Little Lies	Wyndham's Theatre
1986	The Petition	National Theatre/Wyndham's Theatre
1987	Pygmalion	Plymouth Theatre, New York City
From 1992	One-man show	Various venues

== Box office ranking ==
For a number of years, British film exhibitors voted him among the top ten British stars at the box office via an annual poll in the Motion Picture Herald.

- 1945 – 4th
- 1946 – 8th
- 1947 – 4th (6th most popular overall)
- 1948 – 3rd (4th most popular overall)
- 1949 – 3rd (8th most popular overall)
- 1950 – 4th (6th most popular overall)
- 1954 – 10th
- 1955 – 2nd (5th most popular overall)
- 1956 – 10th
- 1957 – 6th
- 1958 – 6th
- 1961 – 5th

== See also ==
- List of British actors
- List of Academy Award winners and nominees from Great Britain
- List of actors with Academy Award nominations
- List of actors nominated for Academy Awards for non-English performances
