= Richwater Films =

British film production company

- Industry: Entertainment
- Founded: 2013
- Founders: Jonathan Sothcott
- Defunct: 2016
- Headquarters: London, United Kingdom
- Key people: Jonathan Sothcott
- Products: Motion pictures

Richwater Films was a British film production and financing company and distributor, launched in 2013 by Jonathan Sothcott, which specialised in crime, thriller and action films.

== History ==
The company was launched in 2013 and the first film that it produced was Vendetta starring Danny Dyer, Vincent Regan and Bruce Payne. It later produced Top Dog (2014) directed by Martin Kemp and starring Leo Gregory, We Still Kill the Old Way (2014), Age of Kill (2014) and Renegades (2014).

In April 2015, Richwater Films announced that it had teamed up with WWE Studios to co-produce and co-finance two action-thrillers, Eliminators and Rampage.

== Filmography ==
Title	Release date
Vendetta	2013
Top Dog	2014
We Still Kill the Old Way	2014
Age of Kill	2015
We Still Steal the Old Way	2016
Bonded by Blood 2	2016
