= We Still Kill the Old Way =

We Still Kill the Old Way may refer to:

- We Still Kill the Old Way (1967 film), an Italian crime film
- We Still Kill the Old Way (2014 film), a British crime drama film
- "We Still Kill the Old Way, a song by Lostprophets from Start Something
