= Nick Moran =

British actor, writer, producer and director

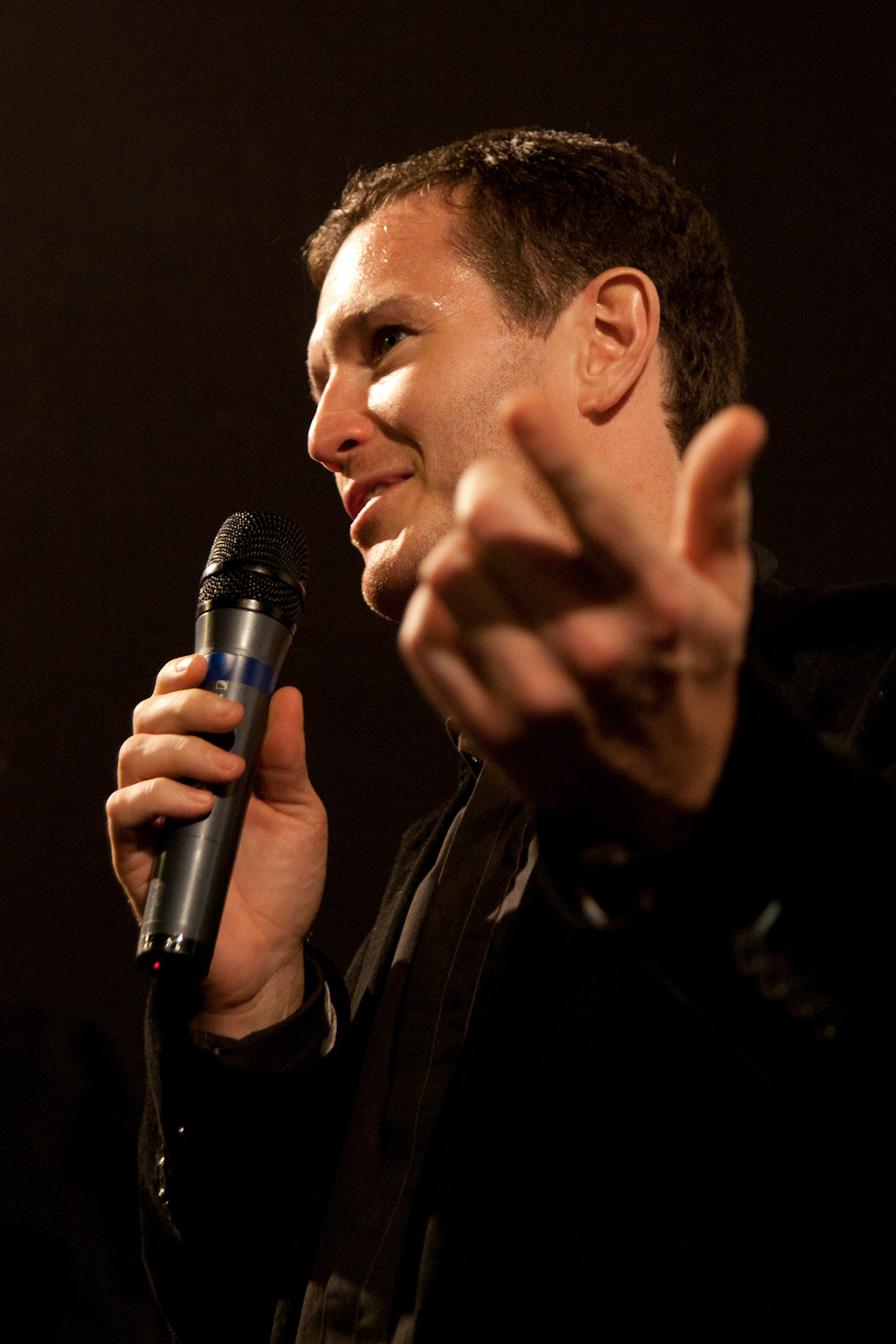
- Moran in France, October 2010
- Born: 23 December 1969 (age 56); London, England
- Occupations: Actor; filmmaker
- Years active: 1989–present
- Spouse: Sienna Guillory (m. 1997; div. 2000) Jasmine Piran (m. 2015)

Nick Moran (born 23 December 1969) is an English actor and filmmaker. His roles include Eddie the card sharp in Lock, Stock and Two Smoking Barrels (1998) and Scabior in Harry Potter and the Deathly Hallows – Part 1 (2010) and Part 2 (2011).

== Early life ==
Moran was born in the East End of London, to a hairdresser mother and an Automobile Association worker father. He grew up on the South Oxhey council estate near Watford and the Greater London boundary.

== Career ==
=== Film ===
Moran's first hit film appearance was in 1990 alongside Roger Daltrey and Chesney Hawkes, in Buddy's Song (1990). His first lead role was later that year, in Vera Neubauer's Don't Be Afraid (1990). He then went on to star with Britpack waifs Hans Matheson and Samantha Morton in a Coky Giedroyc short, The Future Lasts a Long Time (1996). In Lock, Stock and Two Smoking Barrels (1998), he shared the screen with Jason Statham, Dexter Fletcher, Jason Flemyng, Vinnie Jones and British singer Sting, who played the role of his father, JD.

Moran co-starred with John Hurt in New Blood (1999), and also starred with Joseph Fiennes, Sadie Frost and Tara FitzGerald in Rancid Aluminium (2000). In 2001, he played the role of Aramis in The Musketeer, a film loosely based on Alexandre Dumas, père's classic novel, The Three Musketeers. The film co-starred Catherine Deneuve, Tim Roth, Mena Suvari, Stephen Rea and Bill Treacher, with Justin Chambers in the role of D'Artagnan.

After his directorial début in Telstar: The Joe Meek Story, Moran went on to film The Kid, an adaptation of Kevin Lewis's book of the same name. The film was released in 2010 and stars Rupert Friend, Ioan Gruffudd, Natascha McElhone and Liam Cunningham.

He appeared as Scabior, a snatcher in Fenrir Greyback's gang, in Harry Potter and the Deathly Hallows – Part 1 and Part 2.

=== Stage ===
Moran's first stage appearances was understudying the lead in Blood Brothers in London's West End. He was in the original cast of Nick Grosso's Real Classy Affair at the Royal Court Theatre. Subsequent appearances include Paul Webb's Four Nights in Knaresborough, Look Back in Anger (both in 2001), Alfie in 2003, The Countess in 2005, and from November 2013 until March 2014, as 'Juror 7' in Twelve Angry Men at the Garrick Theatre.

Moran co-wrote the play Telstar with James Hicks. It is a dramatisation of the life of Joe Meek, one of Britain's early independent record producers, who had a massive worldwide hit with the Tornados' 1962 "Telstar" single. The play was directed by Paul Jepson and was staged at the New Ambassadors Theatre, London, from 21 June to 12 September 2005. This was the play's West End début after a small-scale National Tour that featured Linda Robson, Adam Rickitt and Con O'Neill. A screen adaptation of the play, directed by Moran, was released in 2009. Con O'Neill reprised his stage role as Meek; Kevin Spacey played his financier, Major Banks.

Moran also starred in the lead role of Roaring Trade at Park Theatre in October 2015.

== Personal life ==
Moran fronts his own Frank Sinatra tribute band, often appearing at London's Café de Paris and various charity events.

In Moran's spare time, he practises karate.

== Filmography ==
=== Feature films ===
Year	Title	Role	Notes
1989	Hard Days, Hard Nights	Rick	
1991	Buddy's Song	Mike	
1997	Clancy's Kitchen	Ivan	
1998	Miss Monday	Jeremy	
1998	Lock, Stock and Two Smoking Barrels	Eddie	
1999	New Blood	Danny White	
1999	Star! Star!	Anatol	
2000	Rancid Aluminium	Harry	
2000	Christie Malry's Own Double-Entry	Christie Malry	
2001	The Proposal	Terry Martin	
2001	Another Life	Percy Thompson	
2001	The Musketeer	Aramis	
2003	Ashes and Sand	Daniel	
2003	Chaos and Cadavers	Edward Taggert	
2004	The Baby Juice Express	Des	
2004	Soccer Dog: European Cup	Bryan MacGreggor	
2004	Spivs	Steve	
2004	American Daylight	Lawrence Stokowski	
2005	Silent Partner	Gordon Patrick	
2005	Puritan	Simon Puritan	
2005	The Poker Academy	Lee Jackson	
2006	The Last Drop	Pvt. Alan Ives	
2006	The Amazing Grace	John Newton	Also writer
2007	Clubbing to Death	Mark	
2008	Telstar: The Joe Meek Story	Alex Meek	Also writer and director
2009	Goal III: Taking on the World	Nick Ashworth	
2010	Harry Potter and the Deathly Hallows – Part 1	Scabior	
2011	Harry Potter and the Deathly Hallows – Part 2	Scabior	
2012	St George's Day	Richard	
2012	After Death	Roger Lazlo Smith	
2013	13 Eerie	Larry Jefferson	
2013	Prisoners of the Sun	Adam Prime	
2014	Down Dog	Bill	
2015	Age of Kill	Roy Dixon	
2016	The Habit of Beauty	Adam	
2016	Crow	Tucker	
2016	Don't Knock Twice	Detective Boardman	
2017	Eat Locals	Private Rose	
2017	My Name Is Lenny	Johnny Bootnose	
2017	London Heist	DCI Wickstead	
2018	Accident Man	Leonard Kent	
2018	Boogie Man	Gerry	
2018	Terminal	Illing	
2019	Avengement	Hyde	
2020	The Black Emperor of Broadway	Jasper Deeter	
2020	Greatland	Clerk	
2020	The American King	Chad Wanker	
2021	Creation Stories	Malcolm McLaren	Also director
2021	Nemesis	Frank Conway	
2022	Hounded	Mallory	
2022	Renegades	Burton	
2022	Repeater	Jean Rosseau	
2023	The Perfect Wedding	Drag Queen	
2023	Not By the Book	Eddie	
2023	One Ranger	Yuri the Cossack	
2023	Boudica: Queen of War	Catus Decianus	
2024	Firecracker	Knight	
2024	Chief of Station	Evgeny Khalikov	
2024	Cookster: The Darkest Days	Mick	
2025	Savage Flowers	Pa	
2025	Finding My Voice	Simon	
2026	Knightfall	Carmichael	

=== Television ===
- Heartbeat – "Keep on Running" (1992) as Rick Parker
- Eldorado (1992) – as Jim
- Casualty – "Money Talks" (1992) as Jez
- The Bill – "In Broad Daylight" (1993) as Dean Stacey / "Picking Up the Pieces" (1995) as Todd Grant / "A Bitter Pill" (1997) as Paul Shea
- Midsomer Murders – "Blood Will Out" (1999) as Michael Smith
- CI5: The New Professionals – "Miss Hit" (1999) as Tony Radelli
- Born to Shine (2011)
- Mr Selfridge (2012) as Reg Towler
- The Wrong Mans as Stevens
- By Any Means as Jamie Caine
- The Great Train Robbery as Jack Slipper
- Death in Paradise (2015) as Pete Thunders
- Babs (2017) as John Deeks
- Celebrity MasterChef (2017) as Contestant
- Inside No. 9 – "Once Removed" (2018) as Spike
- Shakespeare & Hathaway: Private Investigators – "This Rough Magic" (2018) as Steffan Shiplake
- Lucky Man – "The Zero Option" (2018) as Darius Kelleher
- Whitstable Pearl – "Someone Like Me" (2024) as Anthony Corella
- The Sunshine Murders – "From Dig to Dust" (2025) as Brian Stanley
