= Martin Lisemore =

- Born: July 1939
- Died: 3 February 1977 (aged 37)
- Occupation: Television producer
- Spouse: Sarah Lisemore

Martin Arnold Lisemore (July 1939 – 3 February 1977) was a British television producer.

Educated at Abingdon School and then Hardye's School, Dorchester, Lisemore rose through the ranks of the BBC drama department for some years, and became a producer in the late 1960s. He was responsible for many period drama adaptations, including Villette, The Woodlanders, The Spoils of Poynton, Jude the Obscure (1971), Sense and Sensibility (1971) and Emma (1972).

Lisemore quickly established himself as a leading producer of classic period drama, often working in partnership with script editor Betty Willingale. He achieved his greatest success with the dramatisations of Bel Ami (1971), The Pallisers (1974), How Green Was My Valley (1975–76) and I Claudius (1976), the later winning both BAFTA and Emmy awards.

Martin Lisemore was married to Sarah Lisemore, an actress who was the location stand-in for Deborah Watling for location material shot for the Doctor Who story The Enemy of the World in 1968 (Martin Lisemore was the Production Assistant - the BBC term, at the time, for First Assistant - on The Enemy of the World).

On 3 February 1977, during the production of his next series, Murder Most English, Lisemore was killed in a road accident.

== See also ==
- List of Old Abingdonians
