= Renegades (2022 film) =

2022 film by Daniel Zirilli

- Theatrical release poster
- Directed by: Daniel Zirilli
- Written by: Tom Jolliffe; Jonathan Sothcott
- Produced by: Daniel Zirilli; Adam Stephen Kelly; Jonathan Sothcott
- Starring: Nick Moran; Lee Majors; Ian Ogilvy; Louis Mandylor; Michael Paré; Danny Trejo; Patsy Kensit; Billy Murray
- Cinematography: Vince Knight
- Edited by: Daniel Zirilli
- Music by: Robert Geoffrey Hughes; Chris Hurst
- Production company: Shogun Films
- Release date: 1 October 2022
- Country: United Kingdom
- Language: English

Renegades is a 2022 British crime action thriller film directed by Daniel Zirilli, starring Nick Moran, Lee Majors, Ian Ogilvy, Louis Mandylor, Michael Paré, Danny Trejo, Patsy Kensit and Billy Murray.

== Plot ==
When a retired Green beret soldier is murdered by an international drug gang in London, four of his veteran SAS comrades set out to avenge him, dispensing their own brand of justice on the streets of London.

== Cast ==
- Nick Moran as Rifleman Carl Burton
- Lee Majors as Major Carver
- Ian Ogilvy as Major Frederick Peck
- Louis Mandylor as Anthony Goram
- Michael Paré as CIA Agent Donovan
- Danny Trejo as Sanchez
- Patsy Kensit as Judy Carver
- Billy Murray as Major George "Woody" Woodward
- Paul Barber as Sergeant Robert Harris
- Stephanie Beacham as Hartigan
- Jeanine Nerissa Sothcott as Detective Moore
- Tom Lister Jr. as Apollo Jackson
- Michael Brandon as Palmer
- Andy Gatenby as Andre
- Paul Kennedy as Collins
- Lara Pictet as Sofia
- James Chalke as Savo
- Jon Xue Zhang as Blaze
- Nick Khan as Skiver
- Tom Tidiman as Genas
- Danny Bear as Yakveni
- John Craggs as Billy

== Production ==
The film was shot in London with filming wrapping in October 2021. The film-makers described Harry Brown and The Wild Geese as influences on the film.

== Release ==
The film was released for streaming in the United Kingdom on 1 October 2022.

== Reception ==
The film has received mixed reviews. Leslie Felperin, reviewing the film for The Guardian, gave it two out of five stars. Felperin stated that the fim 'belatedly cashes in on the 2010s trend for “geri-action” films' and resembled American fisticuff- and gunfire-packed thrillers such as the Red and Expendables franchises, which were also built around former big-name actors supplementing their pension schemes. Felperin criticised the dialogue within the film which, in their view, sounded 'as if it was written by one of those newfangled AI chatbots, or maybe an actual human being who aspires to write as well as an AI chatbot but is not there yet'. In contrast, a reviewer for IndieWrap stated that the film was 'marked by high stakes, gory shootouts and spectacular explosions' and was 'a highly engaging and spectacularly entertaining action film that succeeds in more ways than one'. Similarly, Chris Ward described the film as 'a very enjoyable movie' and stated that it was a 'mash-up of Expendables, Death Wish and every Cockney geezer crime movie you have ever seen'. In his review of the film, which he gave a B−, Jim McLellan stated that British entries in the geezer action genre range from the serious Harry Brown to the silly Cockneys vs Zombies. In McLellan's view, Renegades sits somewhere between those two. McLellan commented that the influence of Guy Ritchie on the film was 'palpable', but it lacked 'the same amount of charm' as Ritchie's films. However, McLellan stated that Ian Ogilvy was 'an honourable exception' in this respect and demonstrated 'exactly why he was a leading contender in the eighties to succeed Roger Moore in wearing the Bond tuxedo'. Rob Williams described the film as 'a fun adventure with a lot of famous faces and reasonably shot action'.
