= Andy Gatenby =

English actor

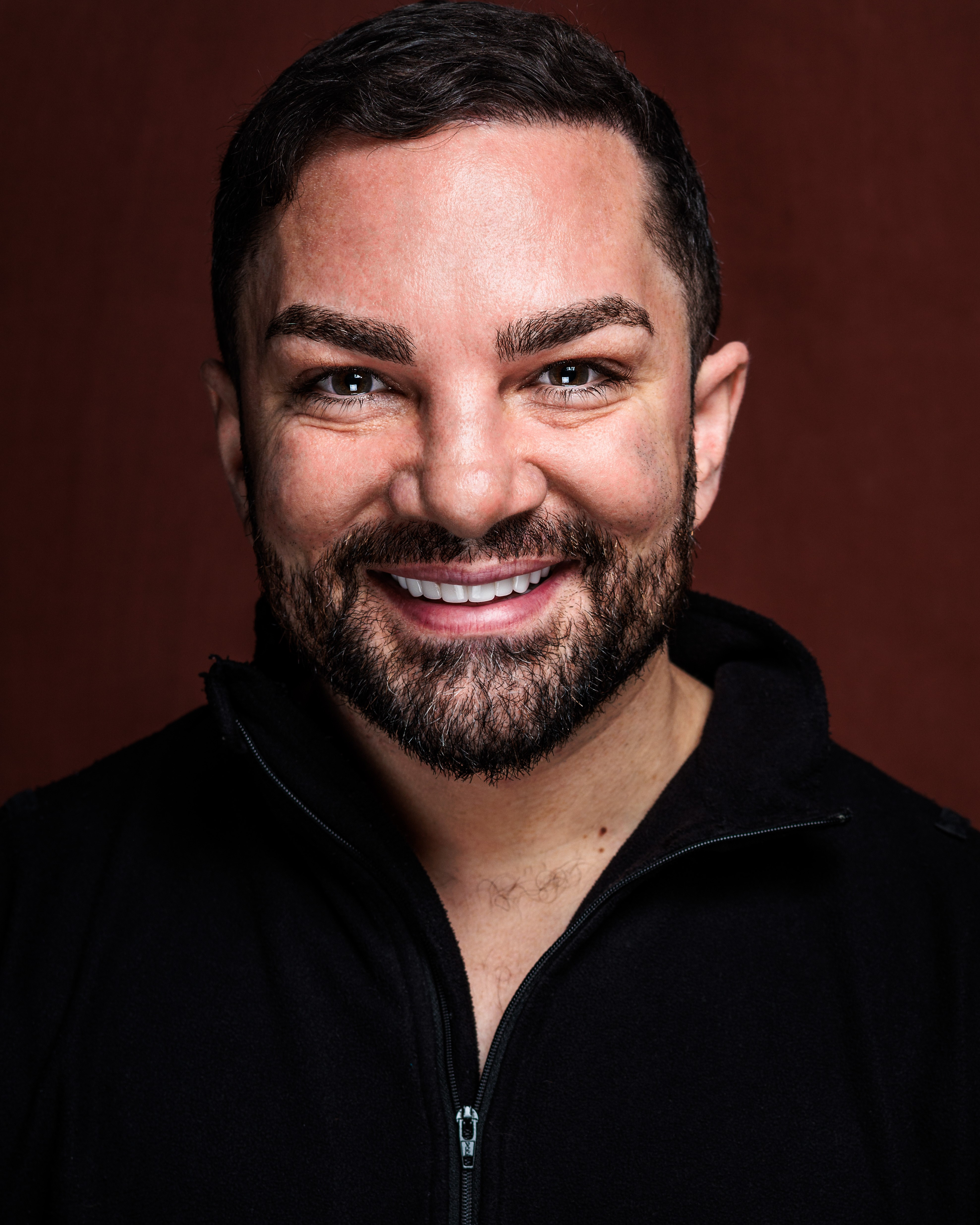
- Born: Andrew Michael Gatenby; 9 April 1987 (age 39); Gütersloh, Germany
- Occupation: Actor
- Years active: 2015–present
- Children: 2
- Website: https://www.andygatenby.co.uk/

Andy Gatenby (born 9 April 1987) is a British actor, best known for his role in the crime film Nemesis (2021). He is also a former unbeaten professional boxer, holding a record of 6-0.

== Boxing career ==
6 wins, 0 defeats, 0 draws
Result	Record	Opponent	Date	Location
Win	6–0	(Slovakia) Elemir Rafael	2014-09-20	(United Kingdom) Portsmouth Pyramids Centre, Portsmouth
Win	5–0	(United Kingdom) Qasim Hussain	2014-03-15	(United Kingdom) Civic Hall, Grays
Win	4–0	(United Kingdom) Dan Carr	2013-11-30	(United Kingdom) Liquid & Envy Nightclub, Portsmouth
Win	3–0	(Slovakia) Elemir Rafael	2013-09-21	(United Kingdom) Fareham Leisure Centre, Fareham
Win	2–0	(United Kingdom) Delroy Spencer	2013-06-15	(United Kingdom) Portsmouth Pyramids Centre, Portsmouth
Win	1–0	(Estonia) Igor Tsujev	2013-02-23	(United Kingdom) Fareham Leisure Centre, Fareham

=== Retirement ===
Gatenby retired from boxing in 2014 over health concerns regarding an eye injury. A doctor reportedly discovered lacerations in his eye during a routine examination, and informed Andy that if he continued boxing he would risk causing a detached retina.

== Acting career ==
In 2015 Gatenby took part in Special Forces: Ultimate Hell Week. The reality show was looking for the toughest civilian in the country and Gatenby reached the final of the six part series before being sent home for showing signs of aggression whilst being interrogated by the SAS. In 2018, Gatenby played the serial killer Cary Stayner on Sky TV's World's Most Evil Killers. In 2019, it was announced that Gatenby would appear in the sequel to The Krays: Marked for Death, the sequel to The Krays: Dead Man Walking, play the twins’ business advisor Leslie Payne.

In 2021, Gatenby made his feature film debut in the British crime film Nemesis as Bruce Payne's henchman, and joined an all star British cast including Billy Murray and Julian Glover. In late 2021, it was announced Gatenby would provide the voice over and motion capture for a character called Mannix Kriegger in the PlayStation 5 video game Dark Mean City. Gatenby has recently finished filming Renegades, an international action film directed by Daniel Zirilli where he played the role of Andre alongside Lee Majors, Danny Trejo and Patsy Kensit. The film is due to be released later in 2022.

== Personal life ==
Gatenby is married with three children and is an ambassador for The Amelia-Mae Foundation, a charity that helps those affected by neuroblastoma. Gatenby's daughter Lexi appeared alongside him in the movie Nemesis.

== Filmography ==
=== Film ===
Year	Title	Role	Notes
2021	Nemesis	Steve	
2022	Renegades	Andre	
2022	Demons at Dawn	Christian Bellows	
2022	Invasion of the Not Quite Dead	Ronald	
2023	Victor	Andrew	
2023	Nightmare on 34th Street	Ray	
2024	Sunray: Fallen Soldier	Tango 2	
2024	Mr Hyde: The Untold Story	Detective Johnstone	
2026	Doctor Plague	Shotz	
TBA	Card Dead	Jimmy Crooks	Post-production
TBA	Macbeth	Thane of Cawdor	Post-production

=== Television ===
Year	Title	Role	Notes
2018	World's Most Evil Killers	Cary Stayner	Episode: "Cary Stayner"
2019	Flying Tiger	Harper	Episode: #2.1
2019	Paradise Street	Darren	All 11 episodes

=== Video games ===
Year	Title	Role
2022	Dark Mean City	Mannix Kriegger

=== Music videos ===
Year	Artist	Song
2020	Beyond Defected	"Someone to Blame"
