= Maigret (1988 film) =

- Written by: Arthur Weingarten
- Directed by: Paul Lynch
- Starring: Richard Harris; Victoria Tennant; Patrick O'Neal; Ian Ogilvy
- Music by: Alan Lisk
- Country of origin: United Kingdom
- Original language: English

Production
- Producer: Arthur Weingarten
- Cinematography: Bob Edwards
- Editor: Lyndon Matthews
- Running time: 94 minutes
- Production companies: Columbia Pictures Television; HTV

Original release
- Network: ITV
- Release: 21 May 1988

Maigret is a 1988 television film starring Richard Harris as Georges Simenon's detective, Jules Maigret. The film was intended as a pilot for a potential television series.

== Production ==
While unhappily working on Archer, a television series adaptation of Ross Macdonald's Lew Archer stories, writer Arthur Weingarten began thinking about doing a mystery series with a different concept.

I kept thinking, 'I've got to change the concept... And out of nowhere Maigret came to mind. I first read Simenon in high school in Brooklyn. No other mystery writers wrote that way. Plot was so secondary to character. Maigret never carried a gun, never ran after anybody. He looked into the shadows of people's lives, into the pain of people's lives.

The studio was uninterested but Weingarten decided to pursue the rights to the character himself. Friendship with Graham Greene got Weingarten an introduction to Georges Simenon. Weingarten locked down American rights but spent five years gathering rights in other countries to attain worldwide rights to the character. He then approached every American network about creating a Maigret series with no success until CBS agreed with the stipulation that he cast an international star. Richard Burton was the first approached and he was keen but two weeks before filming was to commence he dropped out to do Private Lives on Broadway. Alec Guinness was next approached but he declined. Weingarten spent a year negotiating with George C. Scott, but Scott eventually pulled out and with him went CBS.

At this stage, Columbia Pictures Television agreed but Weingarten still needed a Maigret. After viewing A Man Called Horse one evening, he decided to approach Richard Harris. Although Harris didn't physically fit the role, he was up for the challenge as a fan of the character.

I had been introduced to Maigret back in 1972 by John Huston,” Harris revealed at the time. “I was instantly hooked and read sixty or seventy of them. It has been an obsession of mine to play him ever since. As I read the stories I became him in my head. The clue to Maigret is that he watches everything, and throws people into psychological confrontations to get their reactions. I think they were surprised when I said I would do it. Then they said they couldn't pay my full salary. So I said, "I don't have a salary. There is no price for me. If I like it and you can pay me, fine. If not, I'll still do it because I'll enjoy it."

The project got additional funding from HTV and Coca-Cola which brought the budget up to $3 million (US). Filming was shot on location in Paris and the West Country. The script was drawn from a number of Simenon's original novels and the setting was advanced to the then-contemporary 1980s.

== Cast ==
- Richard Harris - Jules Maigret
- Patrick O'Neal - Kevin Portman
- Eric Deacon - Tony Portman
- Victoria Tennant - Victoria Portman
- Ian Ogilvy - Daniel Portman
- Barbara Shelley - Louise Maigret
- Andrew McCulloch - Sgt. Lucas
- Caroline Munro - Carolyn Page

== Release ==
The film was unsuccessful critically which ended any possibility of it spawning a television series. Three years later, fellow Irishman Michael Gambon stepped into the role for another ITV production entitled Maigret which ran for twelve episodes.
