= Nemesis (2021 film) =

Film directed by James Crow

- Official poster
- Directed by: James Crow
- Written by: Adam Stephen Kelly
- Produced by: James Crow; Adam Stephen Kelly; Jonathan Sothcott
- Starring: Billy Murray; Nick Moran; Frank Harper; Jeanine Nerissa Sothcott; Julian Glover; Bruce Payne
- Cinematography: Kristiana Zhekova
- Music by: Robert Geoffrey Hughes; Chris Hurst
- Production company: Shogun Films
- Release date: 29 March 2021
- Running time: 82 minutes
- Country: United Kingdom
- Language: English

Nemesis is a 2021 British crime thriller film. It is directed by James Crow and stars Billy Murray, Nick Moran, Frank Harper, Jeanine Nerissa Sothcott, Julian Glover and Bruce Payne. Murray has stated that his character in the film, John Morgan, is in the mould of Johnny Allen, the character he played in the BBC soap opera EastEnders between 2005 and 2006. The film was released on 29 March 2021.

== Plot ==
An underworld kingpin, John Morgan (Billy Murray), returns to London from semi-retirement in Turkey, along with his wife Sadie (Jeanine Nerissa Sothcott), triggering a cataclysm of violence, retribution and murder. Morgan's return reignites a feud with a vengeful cop named Frank Conway (Nick Moran), is not welcomed by crime boss Damien Osbourne (Bruce Payne) and is the catalyst for bickering between his brother Richard (Frank Harper) and nephew Eddie (Danny Bear). John endeavours to reconcile his family at a party in his apartment, where they are set to meet his daughter Kate’s (Ambra Moore) new girlfriend Zoe (Lucy Aarden), but the family become trapped in their own home by a gang of heavily armed intruders.

== Cast ==
- Billy Murray as John Morgan
- Nick Moran as Frank Conway
- Frank Harper as Richard Morgan
- Jeanine Nerissa Sothcott as Sadie Morgan
- Julian Glover as Sebastian
- Bruce Payne as Damien Osborne
- Ricky Grover as Billy
- Lucy Aarden as Zoe
- Rebecca Ferdinando as Janet
- Rupert Holliday-Evans as Lewis
- Andy Gatenby as Steve
- Johnny Palmiero as Mickey Dean
- Ambra Moore as Kate Morgan
- Danny Bear as Eddie

== Production ==
Principal photography began on 20 September 2020. The film will be distributed, in the UK and Ireland, by Bulldog Film Distribution. Parkland Pictures has acquired worldwide sales rights. Producer Jonathan Sothcott stated that the film was influenced by gangster films such as The Long Good Friday and Sexy Beast and horror films such as The Purge and You're Next.

== Soundtrack ==
Talia Dean (ex singer of band Kings Daughters) performs the song Nemesis which was written for the film. The single was released on 19 March 2021.

== Reception ==
The film has received mixed reviews. Tom Joliffe stated that the film gives Billy Murray 'centre stage, and an opportunity to exude' his 'magnetic charisma'. In Jolliffe's view, 'Murray, even approaching 80, revels in being the headline act' and plays 'brilliantly off Nick Moran (who is superb in the film), as two opposing forces collide again after years apart'. Roger Crow described the film as 'a slick, polished and at times nasty crime saga, which is just what you want from the genre'. Crow praised Bruce Payne for giving a 'brief but stunning turn as Damien, the arch bad guy' and also stated that Jeanine Nerissa Sothcott gave 'a brave, at times jaw-dropping performance as the photogenic matriarch Sadie'. Crow also opined that the film is producer Jonathan Sothcott's 'best offering to date'. Todd Gaines stated that the film is 'a bit different than your typical gangster flick' and 'is entertaining throughout its entire runtime'. Gaines praised 'Nick Moran’s performance as Frank'. Another reviewer stated that 'Jeanine Nerissa Sothcott as Morgan’s long suffering wife Sadie, puts in a really ballsy performance', but that Billy Murray and Nick Moran 'carry proceedings throughout doing all the heavy lifting'. They concluded that 'for fans of the genre [gangster thrillers], Nemesis is going to be a big hit as all the tropes are in there, guns, blood, violence, betrayal, unnecessary nudity and a lot of sneering and swearing'. In their view, Nemesis 'manages this with a tight run time, decent cast and interesting spin on the same formula'. Jeff Turner stated that Nemesis 'is a good solid home invasion thriller which has a nostalgic 70s feel to it, you could almost visualize Charles Bronson leading a movie like this'. Turner also stated that 'Billy Murray and co-star Jeanine Nerissa Sothcott deliver great performances as John Morgan and Sadie Morgan' and that Lucy Aarden (who played Zoe) was 'outstanding'.

In Matt Duddy's view, 'all in all, Nemesis is an enjoyable sub 90 minute romp, which expertly blends two genres together'. Chanel Williams stated that 'it’s an action -packed film from the start and the story gets even better as it goes on'. In Paul Heath's view 'the movie has classic British gangster movie vibes – think back to those ’70s and ’80s fares like The Long Good Friday or even Death Wish in terms of tone and feel rather than the cockney geezer stuff we’ve been bashed with over the past decade or so – and then throw in a disturbing horror/ home invasion theme ala You're Next for the final bit, and you get a feel of what it is aiming for'. According to Heath, 'it all just about works, and the filmmakers have assembled a wonderful cast to populate the feature’s small cast of characters; from overlord boss Damien Osborne (a brief, but dastardly Bruce Payne), to the always reliable Frank Harper, Ricky Grover’s insightful London bartender Billy, Ambra Moore, granddaughter of the late, great Sir Roger, and the legendary screen veteran Julian Glover. Carl Marsh stated that one scene with John Morgan (Billy Murray) and Bruce Payne’s character Damien Osborne reminded him 'of Robert De Niro and Al Pacino meeting' in the Michael Mann film Heat and 'was masterful'. Chris Gelderd stated that 'Payne is the perfect intimidating big-boss going up against Murray’s cool and care-free kingpin' and that 'screen veteran Julian Glover even makes a wonderful appearance as shady lawyer who is clearly relishing being a foul-mouthed know-it-all with the right connections and who talks the talk'. In Gelderd's view Nemesis 'is entertaining for all the right reasons and does the British crime genre justice, just as expected'.

Jonathan Marshall gave the film a less favourable review. He stated that Billy Murray played John Morgan 'expertly' but that the plot of the film 'is prescriptive and perfunctory'. Although Marshall thought that 'the pace vastly improves, and the audience does take some exciting and surprising turns in the intense finale', he lamented that 'after so much time devoted to set-up, the payoff still falls somewhat flat'. Similarly, Cath Clarke, reviewing the film for The Guardian, stated that it 'is let down by the script, which feels cobbled together from geezerish cliches'. Stephen J. Boothroyd stated that 'the film has obvious influences from Tarantino as it follows a similar structure, in terms of lots of dialogue and then saving most of its action for the final scenes. Unfortunately, the script doesn't quite match up with this ambition'.
