= The Spoils of Poynton =

1897 novel by Henry James

- First UK edition
- Author: Henry James
- Language: English
- Publisher: William Heinemann, London; Houghton, Mifflin and Company, Boston
- Publication date: Heinemann: 6 February 1897; Houghton: 13 February 1897
- Publication place: United Kingdom, United States
- Media type: Print (Serial)
- Pages: Heinemann: 286 pp Houghton: 323 pp
- Text: The Spoils of Poynton at Wikisource

The Spoils of Poynton is a novel by Henry James, first published under the title The Old Things as a serial in The Atlantic Monthly in 1896 and then as a book in 1897. This novel traces the shifting relations among three people and a magnificent collection of art, decorative arts, and furniture arrayed like jewels in a country house called Poynton. Mrs. Gereth, a widow of impeccable taste and iron will, formed the collection over decades only to have it torn away from her when her son Owen decides to marry a frivolous woman. The story is largely told from the viewpoint of Fleda Vetch, a keenly intelligent young woman of straitened circumstances who, shortly after becoming the intimate friend and companion of Mrs. Gereth, falls in love with Owen. Sympathetic to Mrs. Gereth's anguish over losing the fine things she patiently collected, Fleda shuttles between the estranged mother and son, becoming ever more involved in their affairs.

== Plot summary ==
Widow Adela Gereth tells the sensitive and tasteful Fleda Vetch that she's afraid her son Owen (heir to the family home Poynton) will marry the coarse Mona Brigstock. Mrs Gereth dreads the prospect of her painstakingly collected furniture and other art objects being given up to a philistine wife, while being left to live alone in Ricks, a small and coarsely designed cottage bequeathed to her. Owen in turn enlists Fleda to get his mother to leave with a minimum of fuss.

Fleda is shocked to find that Mrs Gereth has decorated Ricks with many of the best pieces from Poynton. Owen reports that Mona is angry with the "theft" of the valuable heirlooms, and consequently becomes colder towards him. Meanwhile, he begins to show an attraction to Fleda and eventually declares his love for her. Fleda insists that he honour his engagement to Mona unless she breaks it off.

Mrs Gereth returns the fine furniture to Poynton on the assumption that Fleda has secured Owen for herself. After a few days Owen and Mona are reported to be married, and they go abroad. Fleda gets a letter from Owen asking her to select any one piece from Poynton as hers to keep, and she goes to Poynton some days later only to find it has been consumed by fire.

== Main themes ==
This tightly constructed novel treats several themes common throughout James' work. Fleda Vetch is one of James' typically sensitive central characters, very scrupulous and thus sometimes victimized by the more decisive if less fastidious people around her. Mrs. Gereth is a memorable example of James' unprincipled dominators, who try to bulldoze their way over other people. Disregarding Fleda's scruples, she attempts to force a marriage between Owen and Fleda because she believes it will give her a better chance to retain the "spoils" she so lovingly collected.

Mrs. Gereth also shows the acquisitive collector's mania that James often, though not always, saw as an insidious form of corruption. Owen is a brainless youth of no great harm, though he's easily and obviously confused. James plays Mona mostly for laughs as a bumptious barbarian, though she can turn nasty over acquiring what is due to her.

== Literary significance and criticism ==
Although The Spoils of Poynton is rarely considered one of James' greatest works, most critics have enjoyed the entertaining and well-paced conflict in the novel. The poetic justice of the book's conclusion has also been widely accepted as the best way to finish the struggle. James' portrayal of Mrs. Gereth has received particular acclaim. She sometimes seems almost unbalanced in her passionate devotion to her fine furniture and art objects: "There isn’t one of them I don’t know and love—yes, as one remembers and cherishes the happiest moments of one’s life. Blindfold, in the dark, with the brush of a finger, I could tell one from another. They’re living things to me; they know me, they return the touch of my hand."

Fleda Vetch has earned most critics' sympathy for steering the right course through an almost impossible situation. And there are the usual touches of understated but much-appreciated humor, as when Mrs. Gereth throws one of the Brigstocks' tacky magazines out the door at Mona, and the coarse but athletic girl deftly snares it on the fly. "Good catch!" is Owen's reaction. However, some critics, among them William Veeder, argue that Owen ultimately makes a stronger choice in Mona, because Fleda is too manipulative and mentally unsound a character.

== Adaptations ==
In 1970, the BBC produced a highly regarded 4-part television program based on the book, starring Gemma Jones and Ian Ogilvy. This was broadcast in the U.S. by PBS in 1971 as part of the first season of Masterpiece Theatre. It has survived intact and can easily be found online. It was distributed onto DVD by Acorn Media, although the release is now difficult to find.

In the 1970s Ned Sherrin of Virgin Films unsuccessfully tried to raise finance for a film version of the novel.

== Cultural references ==
In the 2004 Booker Prize–winning novel The Line of Beauty, written by Alan Hollinghurst, two of the main characters attempt to get financing for a film production of the story; this plot point is also included in the 2006 three-part BBC Two serial of the same name, adapted for television by Andrew Davies.

In the novel In a Summer Season by Elizabeth Taylor (novelist), the character of Kate Heron fondly recalls reading The Spoils of Poynton with her late husband and friends Charles and Dorothea. They called Lady Asperley, a mutual friend, The Spoils of Poynton because her obsession with objects reminded them of Mrs. Gereth.

In the novel Mystery by Peter Straub, the character of teacher Dennis Handley describes "...his greatest bookfinding coup, the discovery of a typed manuscript of 'The Spoils of Poynton'". Handley describes how James dictated the novel, in part, to typist William McAlpine, and how he, Handley, couldn’t prove this was THE original manuscript, but he didn’t need to do so; he knew what he had. His telling of this story is spoiled when his audience, student Tom Pasmore, appears to not listen, instead steering the conversation to discussion of a local murder.

Donna Leon: "Beastly Things", Chapter 22.
