= Measle and the Mallockee =

2005 children's novel by Ian Ogilvy

- First edition
- Author: Ian Ogilvy
- Cover artist: Chris Mould
- Language: English
- Series: Measle Stubbs
- Genre: Children's fantasy
- Publisher: Oxford University Press
- Publication date: 6 Oct 2005
- Publication place: United Kingdom
- Media type: Print
- Pages: 384 pages
- ISBN: 978-0060586928
- OCLC: 59512793
- Preceded by: Measle and the Wrathmonk
- Followed by: Measle and the Slitherghoul

Measle and the Mallockee is a children's novel written by Ian Ogilvy and illustrated by Chris Mould. It is the third book in the Measle Stubbs series. The novel was first published in 2005 by Oxford University Press in the UK and HarperCollins in the US.

== Characters ==
- Measle Stubbs/Sam Lee Stubbs - The main character in the book. A thin 10-year-old boy with a funny haircut. His nickname 'Measle' is an anagram of his actual name Sam Lee, invented by his former guardian, Basil Tramplebone.
- Tinker - Measle's dog, who has helped him on a number of occasions.
- Sam Stubbs - Measle's dad. He is also a wizard, although not an incredibly powerful one.
- Lee Stubbs - Measle's mom. She is a manafount, which means that she, although unable to do spells herself, has an unlimited supply of mana which is what magicians use to cast spells. This mana can be tapped into either by her husband holding hands with her or by her being eaten.
- Matilda Stubbs - Measle's Baby Sister.
- Mallockee - A powerful force that need not say the spell to cast it. Like manafounts, they have an unlimited supply of mana.
