= Aileen Raymond =

English actress (1910–2005)

- Born: 23 November 1910; Isle of Wight, England
- Died: 28 April 2005 (aged 94); Kensington and Chelsea, London, England
- Occupation: Actress
- Spouses: John Mills (m. 1932; div. 1940) Francis Ogilvy (m. 1946; died 1964) Albert Charles Buck (m. 1971)
- Children: 2, including Ian Ogilvy

Aileen Cynthia Raymond (23 November 1910 – 28 April 2005) was an English television and stage actress.

She was born on the Isle of Wight in 1910.

She appeared occasionally on British television.

Raymond married three times. Her first husband was actor John Mills (1932–1940). Following their divorce, she married advertising executive Francis Ogilvy (1946–1963), by whom she had two children, daughter Kerry (born 1942) and actor Ian Ogilvy (born 1943). She later married Albert Charles Buck.

Her children only found out that they were born out of wedlock when Kerry found their parents' marriage certificate in 1950.

Raymond died in Kensington and Chelsea, London, aged 94. She died five days after her first husband, John Mills.
