= Dougie Brimson =

English author and screenwriter (born 1959)

- Born: Douglas A Brimson; 1959 (age 66–67); Hemel Hempstead, Hertfordshire, England
- Occupations: Film producer, screenwriter and author.
- Writing career
- Genres: Thriller, drama, comedy
- Website: www.dougiebrimson.com

Douglas Brimson (born 1959 in Hemel Hempstead) is an English film producer, screenwriter and author best known for penning the feature, Green Street. He has written 17 books including the study of hooliganism, Everywhere We Go: Behind the Matchday Madness and the football gangland trilogy, The Crew, Top Dog and In The Know.

== Career ==
After 18 years service with the Royal Air Force, including both the Falklands War and the first Gulf War, Brimson's literary career began in 1996 when he co-wrote a book exploring the culture of football hooliganism entitled, Everywhere We Go: Behind the Matchday Madness. He has subsequently written a further 15 books in a variety of genres including fiction thriller and fiction comedy. His thriller, In The Know (the third book in the Billy Evans crime trilogy) was released in May 2020.

In 2003 Brimson made the move into screenwriting with the short film "It's a Casual Life", a 15-minute film looking at the world of football violence from a Casuals perspective. His first full-length feature, the Hollywood funded Green Street starring Elijah Wood, was released in September 2005.

His next feature was an adaptation of his own novel Top Dog. Released in May 2014 starring Leo Gregory and directed by former Spandau Ballet singer and star of The Krays, Martin Kemp.

November 2014 saw the release of We Still Kill the Old Way, a vigilante thriller starring Ian Ogilvy, Chris Ellison, Steven Berkhoff and Lysette Anthony.

In 2021, Brimson formed his own film production company, Red Bus Movies. In 2024, actor Leo Gregory announced that he and Brimson has written a script for a genuine sequel to the 2005 movie, Green Street.

Also in 2024, Brimson announced the development of The Lion Of London Bridge. A feature film based on the story of Roy Larner, who fought terrorists unarmed during the 2017 terrorist attack on Borough Market, London.

Brimson has co-hosted a late night comedy show on Liberty Radio, presented The Stock Car Show on Granada Men & Motors and presented the Madder Max show, also on Granada Men & Motors, which examined the diverse world of British motor sport. It began transmission on 24 July 2000 and ran for thirteen consecutive weeks. He has also produced shows for Channel 5 in the UK.

== Personal life ==
Brimson, who is married to Tina and has three children, is an active member of the British Legion and The Falklands War Veterans Association.

== Bibliography ==
=== eBooks ===
- Brimson, Dougie (2012). Wings of a Sparrow. eBookpartnership.com.
- Brimson, Dougie (2011). The Crew. eBookpartnership.com.
- Brimson, Dougie (2011). Top Dog. eBookpartnership.com.
- Brimson, Dougie (2011). The Art of Fart: The joy of flatulanece. eBookpartnership.com. p. 219. ASIN B006MISNFI.
- Brimson, Dougie (2011). Billy's Log: The hilarious diary of one man's struggle with life, lager and the female race. eBookpartnership.com. p. 219. ISBN 978-1-908400-01-7.
- Brimson, Dougie (2011). The Geezers' Guide To Football: A Lifetime of Lads and Lager. Category C Publishing. p. 223. ISBN 978-0-9567221-9-5.
- Brimson, Dougie (2011). Kicking Off: Why hooliganism and racism are killing football. Category C Publishing. p. 352. ISBN 978-1-908400-06-2.

=== Non-fiction ===
- Everywhere We Go: Behind the Matchday Madness (1996)
- England, My England: The Trouble with the National Football Team (1996)
- Capital Punishment: London's Violent Football Following (1997)
- Derby Days: Local Football Rivalries and Feuds (1998)
- The Geezers' Guide to Football: A Lifetime of Lads and Lager (1998)
- Barmy Army: The Changing Face of Football Violence (2000)
- Eurotrashed: The Rise and Rise of Europe's Football Hooligans (2003)
- Kicking Off: Why Hooliganism and Racism Are Killing Football (2006)
- Rebellion: The Growth of Football's Protest Movement (2006)
- March of the Hooligans: Soccer's Bloody Fraternity (2007)

=== Novels ===
- The Crew (1999)
- Billy's Log (2000)
- Top Dog (2001)
- Wings of a Sparrow (2012)
- In The Know (2020)

== Filmography (as writer) ==
- It's a Casual Life (2003)
- Green Street (2005)
- Top Dog (2014)
- We Still Kill the Old Way (2014)
- The Battle For Stathie Manor (2022)

== See also ==
- Screenwriters
- Lists of writers
