= Age of Kill =

- Directed by: Neil Jones
- Written by: Simon Cluett
- Produced by: Neil Jones; Rod Smith; Luke Fairbrass; Jonathan Sothcott
- Starring: Martin Kemp; Patrick Bergin; Bruce Payne
- Cinematography: Ismael Issa
- Production company: Richwater Films
- Release date: 15 June 2015
- Country: United Kingdom
- Language: English

Age of Kill is a 2015 action film directed by Neil Jones and starring Martin Kemp, Patrick Bergin, April Pearson, Philip Davis and Bruce Payne. It was written by Simon Cluett.

== Premise ==
A black ops sniper, Sam Blake (Martin Kemp), is blackmailed by a psychotic terrorist known only as "Jericho" into killing six seemingly unrelated people in six hours. If he fails, misses a target, goes to the police or is caught, the death toll will be far higher.

== Cast ==
- Martin Kemp as Sam Blake
- Patrick Bergin as Sir Alistair Montcrief
- Bruce Payne as Prime Minister
- Dexter Fletcher as Major Jackman
- April Pearson as Lexi
- Philip Davis as Bill Weybridge
- Nick Moran as Roy Dixon
- Donna Air as Sarah
- Lucy Pinder as Jenna
- Anouska Mond as D.I. Hannah Siddiq
- Dani Dyer as Joss Blake
- Sebastian Street as Agent Dalton
- Tony Denham as Gaz
- Chris Brazier as D.C. Hicks
- Bartley Burke as Agent Cole
- George McCluskey as PC Flynn
- Mike Firth as Passerby

== Reception ==
The film received largely negative reviews. Matt Glasby of Total Film stated that 'Neil Jones threadbare Brit thriller short-changes all comers, particularly lead Martin Kemp, who plays a government hitman blackmailed into going rogue, and co-stars Nick Moran and Patrick Bergin, who add some undeserved class'. Allie Gemmill stated that Age of Kill is 'ultimately another poorly acted, poorly constructed film that will only disappoint viewers who are hungry for a good action film'. Mark Kermode stated that the film 'will disappoint even the most undiscerning viewer'. In Stuart Boyland's view 'all but the staunchest fans of the cockney-tough-guy, sub-standard sub-genre of action thrillers should probably steer clear' of the film. In contrast, Eoin Friel stated that 'Age of Kill is another winner for Richwater films with a great cast, fast pace and some decent action'. Ivo Bochenski also gave the film a favourable review, stating that it was 'an enjoyable modern day spy thriller with an intriguing cast of East End faces'. Mike Haberfelner stated that the film is 'full of action and the plot moves forward at a very steady pace - but that said it's anything but a one-dimensional action flick, its plot is complex and multi-layered, twists and turns and is full of surprises, it leads us into a grey area rather than presenting us with the typical good vs evil dichotomy, and it features a bunch of interesting, colourful characters'. In Paul Heath's view 'for a low-budget, though high-octane, British action film with surprisingly big production values, Age Of Kill is a film that won't overly delight the critics, but is perfect for that post-pub visit on a Friday night to slap on with your mates'.
