= Jonathan Sothcott =

British film producer

- Sothcott in 2020
- Born: Jonathan Paul Sothcott; 26 April 1980 (age 46); Redhill, Surrey, England
- Occupations: Film producer, author
- Years active: 2002–present
- Spouse: Jeanine Nerissa Sothcott (m. 2020)
- Website: jonathansothcott.com

Jonathan Sothcott (born 26 April 1980) is a British film producer and author.

== Biography ==
Sothcott was born in Redhill, Surrey, and at the age of six moved with his family to East Sussex, where he grew up.

Before making his name in feature films, Sothcott produced documentaries and moderated DVD commentaries for numerous cult films, including The Wild Geese, Dr. Who and the Daleks, Summer Holiday, and many horror films.

Sothcott is the CEO of Shogun Films, a production company focusing on typically lower budget crime and thriller movies.

Sothcott's published works include The Jermyn Street Shirt (The History Press, 2021) and The Cult Films of Christopher Lee (Eaton Books, 2000).

== Selected filmography ==
- Devil's Playground (2010)
- Dead Cert (2010)
- Stalker (2010)
- The Rise and Fall of a White Collar Hooligan (2012)
- Riot (2012)
- The Fall of the Essex Boys (2013)
- Vendetta (2013)
- Top Dog (2014)
- We Still Kill the Old Way (2014)
- Age of Kill (2015)
- Eat Locals (2017)
- Bonded by Blood 2 (2017)
- We Still Steal the Old Way (2017)
- The Exorcism of Karen Walker (2018)
- The Krays: Dead Man Walking (2018)
- Trigger Finger (executive producer) (2018)
- Pentagram (producer) (2019)
- Nemesis (producer) (2021)
- Renegades (producer) (2022)
- Peter Rabid (producer) (2024)
- Helloween (producer) (2025)
- Doctor Plague (producer) (2026)
- Harbinger (producer) (2026)
- Knightfall (producer) (2026)

== Bibliography ==
- The Cult Films of Christopher Lee, 2000
- (With James Mullinger) The Films of Danny Dyer, 2013
- The Jermyn Street Shirt, 2021
