= Measle and the Wrathmonk =

2004 novel by Ian Ogilvy

- First edition (UK)
- Author: Ian Ogilvy
- Illustrator: Chris Mould
- Language: English
- Series: Booty
- Genre: Children's fantasy
- Published: 2004 (Oxford University Press) (UK); 2004 (HarperCollins) (US)
- Publication place: United Kingdom
- Media type: Paperback & Hardcover
- Pages: 208
- ISBN: 0-19-271952-1
- OCLC: 59137744
- Followed by: Measle and the Dragodon

Measle and the Wrathmonk is a children's fantasy novel written by Ian Ogilvy and illustrated by Chris Mould. It was released in 2004 by OUP in the UK and by HarperCollins in the US. It received the Georgia Children's Book Award. It has been translated into at least seven languages.

The first edition was published with a lurid green vinyl cover; the author commented: "It smells like a beach ball or a lilo... It's the brightest, most seeable thing in the whole store. The next one’s going to be luminous orange."

The novel was reissued by OUP in 2010 under the title The Train Set of Terror!

== Plot summary ==
A 10-year-old boy named Measle is living with his horrid guardian, Basil Tramplebone. Measle's life is horrible and boring. Basil builds a detailed train set using money that was left for Measle by his parents and plays with it, while all Measle can do is watch him. Desperate to play with it, Measle tricks Basil into leaving the house by telling him that there is extra money in the bank. His plan backfires, and Basil catches him playing with the train set when he gets home. Basil magically shrinks Measle and placed him in the train set. Measle meets Frank, the electrician who wired the train set, who is all plastic except for his mouth. Measle then feeds him some carrot, which restores Frank to his previous human-form. Frank reveals that the glazed-donut crumbs and lemonade left by Basil turn you to plastic if eaten. Together they rescue Prudence, a wrathmonkologist; William, an encyclopaedia salesman; Kitty, a Brownie scout; Lady Grant, a town official; and Kip, the carpenter who built the table and most of the train set's detail work.

== Characters ==
Measle Stubbs – The main character in the book. A thin 10-year-old boy. He is called 'Measle' because wrathmonks enjoy confusing people by rearranging words. When his parents appear again he learns his real name (Sam Lee), but he still prefers to be called Measle.

Basil Tramplebone – The villain in the book. He is a "wrathmonk", which is a warlock that has gone mad or insane. He is the legal guardian of Measle Stubbs. He is also after the money that Measle is supposed to inherit from his "dead" parents. Described as thin, tall, and has black hair that is kept on his head with black shoe polish. According to Measle, Basil never lies.

Griswold Gristle – A bank manager that helps Basil claim Measle's money. Oddly looks and talks like Basil, and is a wrathmonk according to later books.

Frank Hunter – An electrician who ate some of the lemonade and doughnuts, thus he was turned into plastic. Measle helps him turn back to normal.

Lady Grant – A victim of Basil Tramplebone. She is a borough councillor from town hall that tried to make Basil repair his house. This caused Basil to get mad, and so, she was shrunk. She also uses the word 'revolting' often. She makes a point of being civil to everyone and polite. She claims that Basil is an exception even though she knows it’s wrong to hate anyone he is an exception. She is a bit snobby such as about Measle’s unkempt appearance but generally means well.

William O. Durham – A victim of Basil Tramplebone. He is a travelling salesman that tried to sell Basil expensive encyclopaedias. His foot got caught when Basil closed the door, making Basil angry, and William shrunken. He often uses tasteless jokes that no one usually finds amusing. He believes in logic and knowledge. He is very fond of his encyclopaedias and is very dismissive of anything fanciful or magic not in them. He does not believe in Wrathmonks at first for example despite literally being one’s victim. He eventually very grudgingly accepts magic exists.

Kitty Webb – Another victim of Basil Tramplebone. She was a girl scout that was selling cookies, but was scared by Basil's appearance and tried to run away. Basil caught her and shrunk her. She is often afraid but can be brave. She seems to develop something of a crush on Measle. Her knot tying skills come in handy later in the book.

Kip Lovell – A victim of Basil Tramplebone. He is a carpenter who made a table for Basil; however, Basil was not pleased by it, so Kip was shrunk. Kip had been there the longest so he was almost all plastic. When revived he is very practical and helpful. He seems to find moving and talking hard at first but gets better.

Prudence Preyer – A victim of Basil Tramplebone. She was a wrathmonkologist, someone who studies wrathmonks, and was spying on Basil for six months but got caught one day because her dog, Tinker, had barked, causing Basil to notice them. She has a snarky sense of humour particularly towards William and his refusal to accept the obvious.

Sam Stubbs – Measle's dad. He is a wizard.

Lee Stubbs – Measle's mum. She is a manafount which means she, although unable to do spells herself, has an unlimited supply of mana, which is what magicians use to cast spells. This mana can be tapped into either by her husband holding hands with her or by her being eaten. (see Measle and the Dragodon)

== Major themes ==
1. Little people can make a difference.
2. Eat your vegetables.
3. Looks can be deceiving.
4. What goes around, comes around.

== Awards ==
- Georgia Children's Book Award

== Film adaptation ==
On November 13, 2008, Thor Freudenthal set to direct the film adaptation at Warner Bros. with Robert Zemeckis was set to produce the film. A company called PRANA has since shown interest and plans to turn the book into a Pixar type animated film.
