= Top Dog (2014 film) =

- Directed by: Martin Kemp
- Written by: Dougie Brimson
- Produced by: Wayne Hodgson; Nick Aldrich; Simon Cluett; Jonathan Sothcott
- Starring: Leo Gregory; Vincent Regan; Ricci Harnett
- Cinematography: Haider Zafar
- Production company: Richwater Films
- Distributed by: Universal Pictures
- Release date: 1 June 2014
- Country: United Kingdom
- Language: English
- Budget: £837,000

Top Dog is a crime drama film directed by Martin Kemp and starring Leo Gregory, Vincent Regan and Ricci Harnett. It is based on the novel written by Dougie Brimson, who also penned the screenplay.

== Premise ==
A hooligan boss Billy Evans (Leo Gregory) feuds with gangster Mickey (Ricci Harnett) over a backstreet protection racket and quickly finds himself out of his depth as events rapidly escalate and he finds that he has taken on far more than he can handle.

== Cast ==
- Leo Gregory as Billy Evans
- Ricci Harnett as Mickey
- Vincent Regan as Mr Watson
- George Russo as Hawk
- Dannielle Brent as Sam
- Jason Flemyng as Dan
- Lorraine Stanley as Julie
- Susan Penhaligon as Sal
- George Sweeney as Steve

== Release ==
The film was released on DVD on 1 June 2014.
