= Vendetta (2013 film) =

2013 UK action film written and directed by Stephen Reynolds

- Directed by: Stephen Reynolds
- Written by: Stephen Reynolds
- Produced by: Jonathan Sothcott; Damien Morley
- Starring: Danny Dyer; Vincent Regan; Bruce Payne
- Cinematography: Haider Zafar
- Music by: Phil Mountford
- Production company: Richwater Films
- Distributed by: Anchor Bay
- Release date: 22 November 2013
- Running time: 114 minutes
- Country: United Kingdom
- Language: English
- Box office: £5,132

Vendetta is a 2013 British action thriller film written and directed by Stephen Reynolds and starring Roxanne McKee, Danny Dyer, Vincent Regan, and Bruce Payne.

== Premise ==
Special ops interrogation officer Jimmy Vickers (Danny Dyer) tracks down a gang who slaughtered his parents while avoiding being found by his old unit and the cops. With the help of friends PC Griffin and Freddy, he tracks down each gang member and conducts on each a different form of brutal torture.

== Cast ==
- Danny Dyer as Jimmy Vickers
- Roxanne McKee as Morgan
- Vincent Regan as Colonel Leach
- Bruce Payne as Mr Rooker
- Nick Nevern as Freddy
- Ricci Harnett as Sergeant Joe Windsor
- Lucy Drive as Catherine Hopkins
- Josef Altin as Rob
- Emma Samms as Sandra Vickers
- Alistair Petrie as DCI Spencer Holland
- Charlie Bond as Kerry
- Tony Denham as George Vickers
- Tamaryn Payne as PC Jenny Clarke
- Anna Brecon as Julia
- James Mullinger as Alex
- Sam Kane as Dennis
- Tyrese Abbott as Chow
- Elijah Baker as Joshua Evans

== Release and reception ==
The film was released in a few select cinemas in the UK on 22 November 2013 (where it was the most successful Danny Dyer film since Dead Man Running) and on DVD and Blu-ray on 23 December 2013. Reviews were distinctly polarised but the film was widely praised for its high production values. Rob James, writing for Total Film gave the film a score of 3 out 5 and stated that "viewed as a Brit answer to '70s and '80s exploitation flicks, endless Seagal movies and First Blood (Dyer is rogue SAS; his colonel issues Trautman-esque warnings), it's surprisingly decent". Stuart Wright, who reviewed the film for Britflicks, also gave it a score of 3 out 5 and stated that 'the plot and action rattle along with a few reversals of expectations along the way to keep you guessing'. Drew McIntyre, who reviewed the film for UKFilmNews, gave the film 3.7 out of 5 and stated that it "is a modern British thriller and stands comparison easily with the other good UK based thrillers of 2013 such as Welcome to the Punch and Hummingbird". In contrast Tim Robey, writing for the Daily Telegraph stated that it is 'jaw-droppingly awful' and gave it one star out of five. Peter Bradshaw, writing for The Guardian, stated that 'Danny Dyer does his patented Dyer stare all the way through this bizarre and ludicrous piece of revenge porn' and gave it a score of two out of five.
