= Ian Ogilvy =

English actor, playwright and novelist (born 1943)

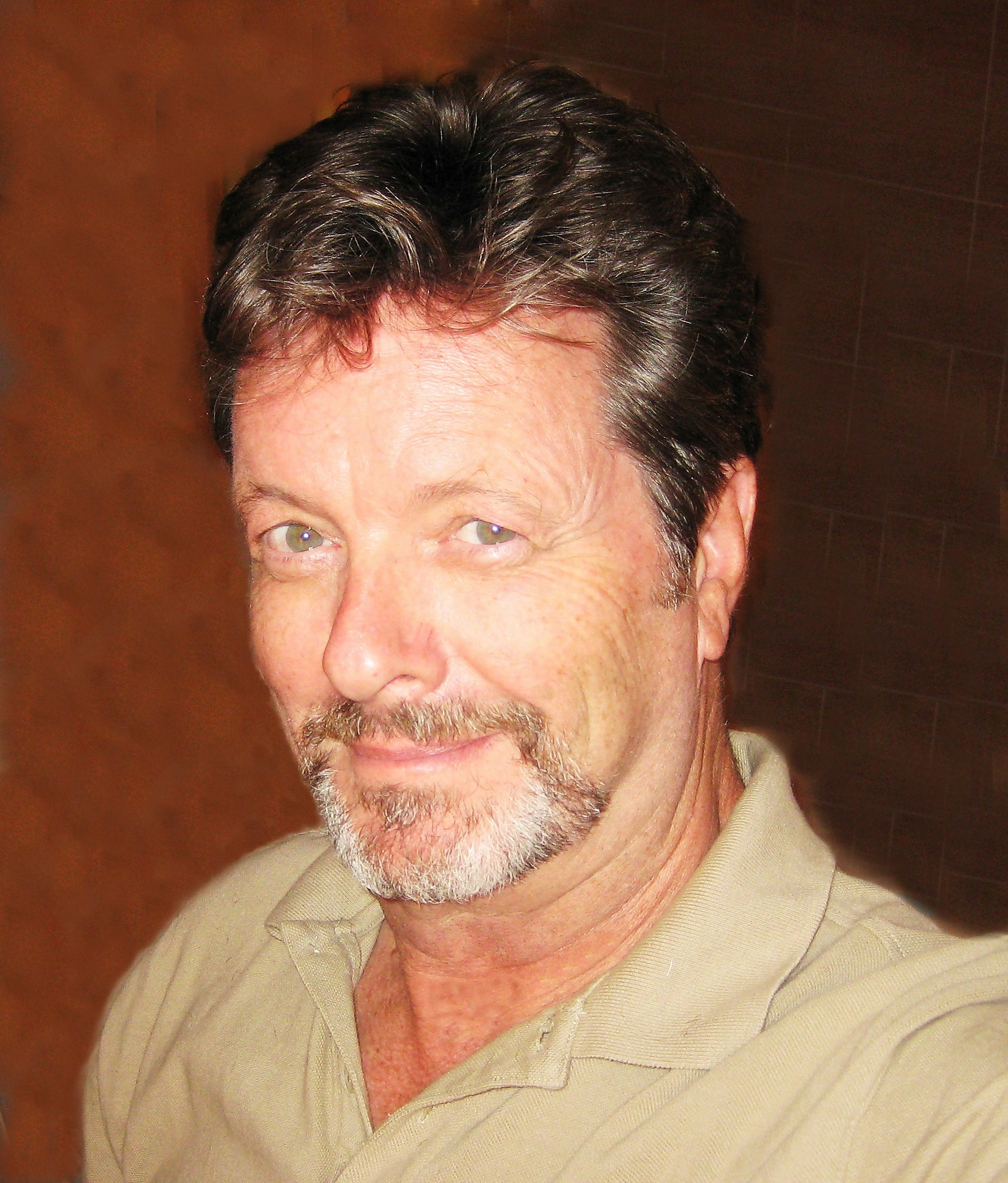
- Ogilvy in 2007
- Born: Ian Raymond Ogilvy; 30 September 1943 (age 82); Woking, Surrey, England
- Occupations: Actor, playwright, novelist
- Years active: 1958–present
- Spouses: Diane Hart (m. 1968; div. 1983) Kathryn Holcomb (m. 1992)
- Children: 1
- Parent(s): Francis Fairfield Ogilvy; Aileen Raymond
- Relatives: David Ogilvy (uncle)
- Website: ianogilvy.com

Ian Raymond Ogilvy (born 30 September 1943) is an English actor, playwright and novelist.

== Early life ==
Ogilvy was born in Woking, Surrey, England, to Francis Fairfield Ogilvy, brother of advertising executive David Ogilvy, and actress Aileen Raymond. His grandfather, Francis John Longley Ogilvy, was born in Argentina and a self-taught Gaelic-speaker who was a classics scholar and a failed financial broker. He was educated at Sunningdale School, Eton College, and the Royal Academy of Dramatic Art.

== Career ==
=== Return of the Saint ===
Ogilvy is best known as the star of the television series Return of the Saint (1978–79), in which he assumed the role of Simon Templar from Roger Moore (1962–69).

The role led to his being considered a leading contender for the role of James Bond in the early 1980s, when Moore announced his intention to leave the role. He never played the part (in part due to Moore's reconsidering his resignation on several occasions), although he did play a Bond-like character in a series of North American TV commercials broadcast in the early 1990s. At least once, in an episode of Kung Fu: The Legend Continues, "Dragon's Wing II", he played a Bond-like British agent, complete with white dinner jacket.

He recorded a series of readings of Ian Fleming's James Bond novels in the early 1980s, which were released on audio cassette by the Listen for Pleasure label.

=== Other notable roles ===
Ogilvy has had an extensive career in the theatre playing leading roles in many London West End productions, including Design for Living, Happy Family, Three Sisters, Rookery Nook by Ben Travers, Run for Your Wife, The Millionairess by Shaw, The Waltz of the Toreadors, and others. He has also worked widely in the American theatre. Among his films, Ogilvy had a major part in the 1970 epic film Waterloo.

He co-starred with Boris Karloff in The Sorcerers (1967); with James Mason, Bobby Darin, and Geraldine Chaplin in Stranger in the House (also 1967); with Vincent Price in Witchfinder General (also known as The Conqueror Worm, 1968); with Tom Courtenay and Candice Bergen in The Day the Fish Came Out (1967); with Meryl Streep and Goldie Hawn in Death Becomes Her (1992); with Peter Cushing in two films for horror specialists Amicus and with Richard Dreyfuss and Nia Vardalos in My Life in Ruins (2009) – among others.

He was a friend of the film-maker Michael Reeves and starred in all three of Reeves's films: Revenge of the Blood Beast (1966), The Sorcerers and Witchfinder General. He also had a role in the short-lived 1990s American soap opera, Malibu Shores. He has had roles in over one hundred television shows, often appearing as a guest star. He appeared in the television series Upstairs, Downstairs (as Lawrence Kirbridge).

He guest-starred in The Avengers in the 1968 episode "They Keep Killing Steed" as Baron Von Curt, and on the BBC in Somerset Maugham's The Door of Opportunity, opposite Marianne Faithfull.

In 1976, he featured in the pilot episode of the BBC television comedy series Ripping Yarns as The School Bully in "Tomkinson’s Schooldays"; he also appeared in I, Claudius (1976, as Drusus), and guest-starred in 6 episodes of Murder, She Wrote and 4 episodes of Diagnosis Murder. He appeared as Edgar Linton in a film version of Wuthering Heights (1970) and as Owen Gereth in BBC dramatisation of The Spoils of Poynton (also 1970).

In the 1990s, he guest-starred in the American television series Babylon 5, in the episode "In the Kingdom of the Blind" (1998). The series' star, Bruce Boxleitner, is the former husband of Ogilvy's second wife, actress Kathryn Holcomb. In 2000 he guest starred in Dharma & Greg, season 3 episode 15, "The Trouble with Troubadours", as the sarcastic British hotel night manager.

He appeared in an episode of Call My Bluff on 13 May 1977, the panel game of word definitions and deceptions.

He was the subject of This Is Your Life in 1979 when he was surprised by Eamonn Andrews.

=== Writing career ===
Ogilvy is also a playwright and novelist, currently working on a series of children's books: Measle and the Wrathmonk, Measle and the Dragodon, Measle and the Mallockee, Measle and the Slitherghoul, and Measle and the Doompit. The books have been translated into at least 15 languages.

He has written and published two novels – Loose Chippings and The Polkerton Giant – and two plays: A Slight Hangover and Swap!, which ran in Poland in its third successful year. His memoir, Once a Saint, was published by Little Brown/Constable, in May 2016.

His book of film reviews, Withering Slights, based on his Facebook page, was published by Spiteful Puppet in 2020.

== Personal life ==
Ogilvy was married to Diane Hart from 1968 to 1983; they had one child. He married Kathryn Holcomb in 1992.

== Filmography ==
=== Film ===
Year	Title	Role	Notes
1966	The She Beast	Philip	
1967	Stranger in the House	Desmond Flower	
1967	The Sorcerers	Mike Roscoe	
1967	The Day the Fish Came Out	Peter	
1968	Witchfinder General	Richard Marshall	
1970	Wuthering Heights	Edgar Linton	
1970	The Invincible Six	Ronald	
1970	Waterloo	William Howe De Lancey	
1973	No Sex Please, We're British	David Hunter	
1973	And Now the Screaming Starts!	Charles Fengriffen	
1974	From Beyond the Grave	William Seaton	
1988	Maigret	Daniel Portman	
1992	Invasion of Privacy	Brian	
1992	Eddie Presley	Captain Starch	
1992	Death Becomes Her	Chagall	
1994	Puppet Master 5: The Final Chapter	Jennings	
1996	The Disappearance of Kevin Johnson	Gary	
1999	Fugitive Mind	Dr. Grace	
2007	After Midnight	Dennis	
2009	My Life in Ruins	Stewart Tullen	
2014	We Still Kill the Old Way	Richie Archer	
2016	We Still Steal the Old Way	Richie Archer	
2017	The Saint	Xander, The Fixer	
2018	Mistrust	Ian	Cameo
2022	Renegades	Major Frederick Peck	
2026	Knightfall	Charles Knight	

=== Television ===
Year	Title	Role	Notes
1964	ITV Play of the Week	Tom Olliphant	Episode: "Celebration Dinner"
1964	The Hidden Truth	David Easton	Episode: "Sweets to the Sweet"
1965	Theatre 625	Franz	Episode: "Ironhand"
1965	The Man in Room 17	Pedro Da Silva	Episode: "Safe Conduct"
1966	The Liars	Rupert	All 13 episodes
1966	The Wednesday Play	Viscount Ballantyne	Episode: "The Connoisseur"
1966	Orlando	Moz	5 episodes
1967	Half Hour Story	Ed	Episode: "What Will You Do About Christmas?"
1967	Boy Meets Girl	André	Episode: "Goodnight Pelican"
1967	ITV Playhouse	Lord Windermere	Episode: "Lady Windermere's Fan"
1968	Thirty-Minute Theatre	Peter	Episode: "Child's Play"
1968	Detective	Inspector Appleby	Episode: "Lesson in Anatomy"
1968	The Avengers	Baron Von Curt	Episode: "They Keep Killing Steed"
1969	Out of the Unknown	Herbie	Episode: "Liar!"
1969	Armchair Theatre	David Baurmarez-Smith	Episode: "The Brophy Story"
1969	Strange Report	Toby	Episode: "Report 2493: Kidnap - Whose Pretty Girl Are You?"
1970	The Wednesday Play	Sam	Episode: "Wine of India"
1970	The Spoils of Poynton	Owen Gereth	All 4 episodes
1970	W. Somerset Maugham	Alban Torel	Episode: "The Door of Opportunity"
1970	Thirty-Minute Theatre	Prince of Egypt	Episode: "Helen"
1971	Seasons of the Year	Hector Robinson	Episode: "English Family Robinson"
1972	Man of Straw	Wolfgang Buck	3 episodes
1972	Upstairs, Downstairs	Lawrence Kirbridge	6 episodes
1972	BBC Play of the Month	Arthur Gower	Episode: "Trelawny of the Wells"
1973	BBC Play of the Month	Candide	Episode: "Candide"
1973	Armchair 30	The Man	Episode: "Alfred Potter's Story"
1974	Zodiac	Martin Seacombe	Episode: "Saturn's Rewards"
1974	The Haggard Falcon	Dominic Allardyce	All 4 episodes
1974	Affairs of the Heart	Morris Townsend	Episode: "Catherine"
1974	The Gathering Storm	Edward VIII	TV film
1975	A Man in the Zoo	John Cromartie	TV film
1975	Comedy Premiere	Nigel Benson	Episode: "For Richer for Poorer"
1975	BBC Play of the Month	Rev. Gavin Dishart	Episode: "The Little Minister"
1975	Moll Flanders	Humphrey Oliver	TV film
1976	Ripping Yarns	Grayson	Episode: "Tomkinson's Schooldays"
1976	I, Claudius	Drusus	2 episodes
1978	BBC Play of the Month	Thomas Aimwell	Episode: "The Beaux Stratagem"
1978–1979	Return of the Saint	Simon Templar	24 episodes
1982	Q.E.D.	Lord Sidney Sarandon	Episode: "Infernal Device"
1982–1983	Tom, Dick and Harriet	Richard Maddison	12 episodes
1985	Anna Karenina	Stiva	TV film
1985	Time for Murder	Max Donaldson	Episode: "Mister Clay, Mister Clay"
1986	The Two Ronnies	James Pommfrit	Episode: #12.5
1986	Robin of Sherwood	Lord Edgar	Episode: "Rutterkin"
1986	Maggie	Denholm Sinclair	TV film
1988	Menace Unseen	Duncan Free	All 3 episodes
1988	Maigret	Daniel Portman	TV film
1989	Murder, She Wrote	Harold Baines	Episode: "Appointment in Athens"
1990	Campion	Jimmy Sutane	2 episodes
1990	B.L. Stryker	Jason Stone	Episode: "Grand Theft Hotel"
1990–1991	Generations	Reginald Hewitt	52 episodes
1990	Murder, She Wrote	Peter Baines	Episode: "The Sicilian Encounter"
1990	Over My Dead Body	Inspector Miles Cottrell	Episode: "A Passing Inspection"
1991	P.S. I Luv U	Archibald Bond	Episode: "Smile, You're Dead"
1992	Murder, She Wrote	Peter Templeton	Episode: "The Monte Carlo Murders"
1992	Carol Leifer: Gaudy, Bawdy & Blue	Interviewer	TV film
1993	It Had to Be You	Colin	Episode: "London Calling"
1993	Murder, She Wrote	Lawson Childress	Episode: "Murder in White"
1994	The Adventures of Brisco County, Jr.	Furlong	Episode: "Bounty Hunters' Convention"
1994	Burke's Law	Romeo	Episode: "Who Killed Romeo?"
1994	Walker, Texas Ranger	Shredder Stonham	Episode: "Rampage"
1994	Phenom	Poindexter Bond	Episode: "Just a Family of Doolans Sittin' Around Talkin'"
1994	Kung Fu: The Legend Continues	Sterling	Episode: "Dragonswing II"
1994	Murder, She Wrote	Wade Foster	Episode: "Murder of the Month Club"
1996	Hope & Gloria	David Kirkwood	Episode: "A Sentimental Education"
1996	The Faculty	Marion	Episode: "Opportunity Knockers"
1996	Malibu Shores	Marc Delacourt	7 episodes
1996	The Real Adventures of Jonny Quest	Dr. Smallwood	Episode: "Village of the Doomed"
1997	Murphy Brown	Duncan Briggs	Episode: "How to Marry a Billionaire"
1997	Caroline in the City	Lionel Spencer	2 episodes
1997	JAG	Jeffrey Mason	Episode: "The Good of the Service"
1998	Babylon 5	Lord Jano	Episode: "In the Kingdom of the Blind"
1998	Early Edition	Clive Harbison	Episode: "Show Me the Monet"
1999	Love Boat: The Next Wave	Jack Campbell	Episode: "Other People's Business"
1999	Melrose Place	Leo Turnlow	Episode: "Saving Ryan's Privates"
1999	Baywatch	Miles Clayton	Episode: "Water Dance"
1999	Diagnosis Murder	Jerry Lane	2 episodes
1999	Horse Sense	Miles	TV film
2000	Dharma & Greg	Geoffrey	Episode: "The Trouble with Troubador"
2002	The Parkers	Seymour	Episode: "And the Winner Is..."
2010	Agatha Christie's Marple	Johnny Restarick	Episode: "They Do It with Mirrors"
