= We Still Kill the Old Way (2014 film) =

2014 British crime drama film

- Directed by: Sacha Bennett
- Written by: Dougie Brimson; Sacha Bennett; Gary Lawrence
- Produced by: Neil Jones; Adam Stephen Kelly; Rod Smith; Jonathan Sothcott
- Starring: Ian Ogilvy; Alison Doody; Lysette Anthony; James Cosmo
- Cinematography: Ismael Issa
- Production company: Richwater Films
- Release date: 12 December 2014
- Country: United Kingdom
- Language: English

We Still Kill the Old Way is a British crime drama film written by Dougie Brimson, Sacha Bennett and Gary Lawrence, directed by Sacha Bennett, and starring Ian Ogilvy, Alison Doody, Lysette Anthony and James Cosmo.

== Plot ==
A retired East End gangster, Ritchie Archer, returns to London from Spain to investigate the violent sadistic murder of his brother, Charlie, at the hands of a local street gang called E2. In the process, Ritchie discovers that the police are deliberately delaying the case, out of incompetence, fear or both. Ritchie and his old mates gather to pay their last respects to Charlie, and then set about getting revenge. They start by abducting known associates of the gang's leader, Aaron, during which Ritchie suffers a heart attack and is taken to hospital. They use the investigating detective-inspector's daughter, Lauren, who had a short relationship with Aaron and witnessed Charlie's murder, to trick E2 into trying to kill Ritchie in his hospital bed. The street gang is subsequently ambushed, culminating in a shoot-out; a number of gang members are either incapacitated or killed, and Roy is wounded. Aaron threatens to kill Lauren if the older gang does not surrender. They do so but Ritchie and Aaron fight regardless until armed police arrive on the scene and kill Aaron.

The epilogue shows the old gangsters at the private airport, saying their goodbyes to Ritchie's helicopter when he suddenly appears at their side, mentioning something they did "in 1969, with Charlie", Roy adds "in Turin".

== Cast ==
- Ian Ogilvy as Ritchie Archer
- Alison Doody as DI Susan Taylor
- Christopher Ellison as Roy
- Danny-Boy Hatchard as Aaron
- Lysette Anthony as Lizzie Davis
- James Cosmo as Arthur Bennett
- Steven Berkoff as Charlie Archer
- Nathan Clarke as Dean
- Tony Denham as Butch
- Dani Dyer as Lauren Taylor
- Nicky Henson as Jack Houghton
- John Samuel Kande as Leroy
- Red Madrell as DK
- Anouska Mond as Carmen Archer
- Sagar Radia as Maz
- Adele Silva as Gemma
- Elijah Baker as JB

== Release ==
The film was released on DVD in December 2014.

== Reception ==
Stephen Kelly of Total Film gave the film a score of two stars out of five and stated that it "plays its 'everything was much better in the old days' fantasy more as a crass cartoon than as stark social realism".

== Sequel ==
Producer Jonathan Sothcott brings in his involvement with a sequel to the film called We Still Steal the Old Way, with Sacha Bennett returning to direct and co-write the script alongside Simon Cluett. Ian Ogilvy and the rest of the lead cast members reprised their roles, joined by Julian Glover, Patrick Bergin and Billy Murray playing the main antagonist. It was released in April 2017. A third film, We Still Die the Old Way, was supposedly planned to be released in 2019, however was not, for unknown reasons.
