= List of country and regional avifaunas =

The following is a list of avifauna books for countries and regions of the world, including authoritative field guides.

== Europe ==
- Birds in England, by Andy Brown and Phil Grice, T. & A. D. Poyser, 2005
- Birds in Ireland, by Clive D. Hutchinson, T. & A. D. Poyser, 1989
- Birds of Europe, by Killian Mullarney, Lars Svensson, Dan Zetterström, and Peter J. Grant, Princeton University Press, 1999
- Peterson Field Guide to Birds of Britain and Europe, by Roger Tory Peterson, G. Mountfort, and P.A.D. Hollom, Houghton Mifflin, 1993 (5th Edition)
- Birds in Scotland, by Valerie Thom, T. & A. D. Poyser, 1986
- Birds in Wales, by Iolo Williams, Graham Williams, and Roger Lovegrove, T. & A. D. Poyser, 1994

== Asia ==
- Birds of India, by Richard Grimmett, Carol Inskipp, and Tim Inskipp, Princeton University Press, 1999), limited text.
- A Field Guide to the Birds of Korea, by Woo-Shin Lee, Tae-Hoe Koo, and Jin-Young Park, L.G. Evergreen Foundation, 2000
- A Field Guide to the Birds of China, by John MacKinnon and Karen Phillipps (illustrator), Oxford University Press, 2000
  - The first comprehensive, fully illustrated field guide for the region
- A Guide to the Birds of South-East Asia, by Craig Robson, Princeton University Press, 2000
- A Field Guide to the Birds of Japan, text by Wild Bird Society of Japan, illustrations by Shinji Takano, 1982
  - Classic fully illustrated field guide; out of print
- Handbook of the birds of India and Pakistan, together with those of Bangladesh, Nepal, Bhutan and Sri Lanka, by Salim Ali and Dillon S. Ripley. 10 volumes. Oxford University Press. New Delhi. 1998. Reprinted 2001; out of print.
- Birds of South Asia. The Ripley Guide by Pamela C. Rasmussen and John C. Anderton. Two volumes. Lynx Edicions, Barcelona, 2005.
- A Field Guide to the Birds of Thailand by Craig Robson, New Holland Press, 2004 ISBN 1-84330-921-1
- A Guide to the Birds of Thailand, Boonsong Lekagul & Philip Round, Saha Karn Baet, 1991 ISBN 974-85673-6-2

== Africa and the Middle East ==
- A Guide to the Birds of Western Africa, by Nik Borrow and Ron Demey, Princeton University Press, 2002
- Field Guide to the Birds of the Middle East, by R. F. Porter, S. Christensen, P. Schiermacker-Hansen, T. & A. D. Poyser, 1996
- The Birds of Israel, by Hadoram Shirihai, Princeton University Press, 1996
- Birds of Southern Africa, by Ian Sinclair, Phil Hockey, and Warwick Tarboton, Princeton University Press, 2002
- The Birds of East Africa, by Terry Stevenson and John Fanshawe, Academic Press, 2001
- Field Guide to the Birds of Kenya and Northern Tanzania, by Dale A. Zimmerman, Donald A. Turner, and David J. Pearson, Princeton University Press, 1999
- Birds of The Gambia, Barlow, Wacher and Disley, ISBN 1-873403-32-1

== North America ==
- Birds of North America, by Kenn Kaufman, Houghton Mifflin, 2000
  - Innovative field guide employing digitally enhanced photographs
- Field Guide to the Birds of North America, National Geographic Society, 2002 (4th Edition)
  - First field guide (in 1983) to cover all of North America; considered by many to have been the most authoritative guide until Sibley
- A Field Guide to the Birds of Eastern and Central North America, by Roger Tory Peterson and Virginia Marie Peterson (editor), Houghton Mifflin, revised 2002
  A Field Guide to Western Birds, by Roger Tory Peterson and Virginia Marie Peterson (editor), Houghton Mifflin, revised 1990
  - The current incarnations of the seminal A Field Guide to the Birds, the first modern field guide published by Peterson in 1934
- The Sibley Guide to Birds, by David Allen Sibley, Alfred A.Knopf, 2000
  - The current standard in identification guides for North America; exhaustively illustrated and oversized for a field guide (although there are field-sized Eastern and Western editions), limited text.

== Central America and the Caribbean ==
- Field Guide to Birds of the West Indies, by James Bond, Houghton Mifflin, 1985 (5th Edition)
- A guide to the birds of Mexico and northern Central America, by Steve N.G. Howell and Sophie Webb, Oxford University Press, 1995
- A Guide to the Birds of the West Indies, by Herbert Raffaele, James Wiley, Orlando Garrido, Allan Keith, and Janis Raffaele, Princeton University Press, 1998
- A Guide to the Birds of Panama with Costa Rica, Nicaragua, and Honduras, by Robert S. Ridgely and John A. Gwynne, Jr., Princeton University Press, 1989 (2nd Edition)
- A Guide to the Birds of Costa Rica, by F. Gary Stiles and Alexander F. Skutch, Cornell University Press, 1989
- Birds of the Dominican Republic and Haiti, by Steven Latta, Christopher Rimmer, Allan Keith, and James Wiley (Princeton Field Guides), Princeton University Press, 2006 (also printed in Spanish and French)
- Birds of Trinidad and Tobago, by Richard ffrench, ISBN 0-7136-6759-1
- Birds of Cuba, by Orlando Garrido and Arturo Kirkconnell, Helm Field Guides, London, 2000

== South America ==
- A Guide to the Birds of the Galapagos Islands, by Isabel Castro and Antonia Phillips, Princeton University Press, 1997
- A Guide to the Birds of Peru, by James F. Clements, Ibis Publishing, 2001
- A Guide to the Birds of Colombia, by Steven L. Hilty and William L. Brown, Princeton University Press, 1986
- Birds of Venezuela, by Steven L. Hilty, Princeton University Press, 2003
- Birds of Chile, by Alvaro Jaramillo, Princeton University Press, 2003
- The Birds of Ecuador, by Robert S. Ridgely and Paul J. Greenfield, Cornell University Press, 2001
- The Birds of South America, by Robert S. Ridgely and Guy Tudor, University of Texas Press, 1994

== Australasia ==
- The Field Guide to the Birds of Australia, by Graham Pizzey and Frank Knight (illustrator), HarperCollins, 1997
- Field Guide to the Birds of Australia, by Ken Simpson and Nicolas Day, Princeton University Press, 1999 (6th Edition)

== Antarctica ==
- Birds of Southern South America and Antarctica, by Martin R. de la Peña and Maurice Rumboll, Princeton University Press, 2001

== Oceania ==
- A Field Guide to the Birds of Hawaii and the Tropical Pacific, by H. Douglas Pratt, Phillip L. Bruner, and Delwyn G. Berrett, Princeton University Press, 1987
