= British Birds Rarities Committee =

Official adjudicator of rare bird records in Britain

- Abbreviation: BBRC
- Formation: 1959
- Purpose: Evaluating submitted claims of sightings of rare bird species
- Region served: Great Britain
- Chairman: Paul French
- Volunteers: 10
- Website: bbrc.org.uk

The British Birds Rarities Committee (BBRC), established in 1959, is the national bird rarities committee for Britain. It assesses claimed sightings of bird species that are rarely seen in Britain, based on descriptions, photographs and video recordings submitted by observers. Its findings are published in an annual report in the journal British Birds.

The BBRC covers around 280 species whose annually recorded sightings in Britain fall below a threshold deemed to signify rarity. Since the establishment of the committee, some previously included species have become more common—or at least better recorded; this has resulted in their removal from the committee's list and their reclassification as "scarce migrants".

The committee has a chairman, a secretary, and ten voting members, and is supported by others who serve in an advisory capacity. Since its inception, a total of 69 people have served on the committee as assessors. In addition to assessing annual records of rare birds, the committee conducts regular reviews of batches of previously accepted records on a species-by-species basis, to ensure that only those consistent with advances in knowledge of bird identification are retained, and to determine the subspecies of accepted records. Several species have been problematic for assessment, and extreme examples have taken more than 20 years from initial observation to acceptance. The committee has been criticised for its approach to assessing records where only one observer was present, for not publishing reasons for rejecting the validity of records, and for placing undue weight on descriptive detail when assessing record submissions. Seabird identification has proved particularly difficult, leading some observers to suggest that the committee sets too high a standard.

== Role and status ==
The "Rarity Records Committee" (as it was originally known) was established in 1959 by the editors of the journal British Birds. Its original purpose was to provide a means whereby uniform assessment standards could be applied to all rare bird records across Britain. Prior to the establishment of the committee, records were assessed by local bird recording organisations using varying standards. The most recent statement of the British Birds Rarities Committee's role is given in Bradshaw, Harvey and Steele (2004):

BBRC aims to maintain an accurate database of the occurrence of rare taxa in Britain, in order to enable individuals or organisations to assess the current status of, and any changes in, the patterns of occurrence and distribution of these taxa in Britain.

Contradictory information has been published on the exact nature of the committee's status. On its website, BBRC describes itself as the "official adjudicator of rare bird records in Britain" (although it does not say on what basis it has this status). In Birders: Tales of a Tribe, author Mark Cocker erroneously describes the committee as a "statutory vetting body" (i.e. one established by an Act of Parliament). BBRC's constitution states that it "has no automatic or legal expectation that birders submit records".

The committee does not assess records of birds from Ireland; that task is carried out by the Irish Rare Birds Committee, which publishes its decisions in Irish Birds. Records of IRBC-assessed rarities were included in BBRC annual reports for many years, although this ceased in 2002 at the request of IRBC. Although the British Ornithologists' Union Records Committee does not regard records from the Isle of Man as contributing towards their British list, BBRC does include records from there in its totals. BBRC has had an ongoing sponsor in the German optical equipment manufacturer Carl Zeiss since 1983.

== Species covered ==
Over 580 bird species have been recorded in Britain; some 250 have regular breeding or wintering populations, or are common migrants, and a further 50 are "scarce migrants". The BBRC assesses the remaining species. A list of the species the committee assesses (known as "British Birds rarities", or "BB rarities" for short) is on its website, although the list has not been updated to account for the most recent changes. The committee generally considers only the records of species rare enough to meet its criteria for inclusion on the BBRC rarities list, based on a numerical threshold. In addition to considering full species, records of some rare subspecies are considered and, in a few cases, the committee considers indeterminate records (birds that belong to a pair or group of rare species that are particularly difficult to separate, such as frigatebirds).

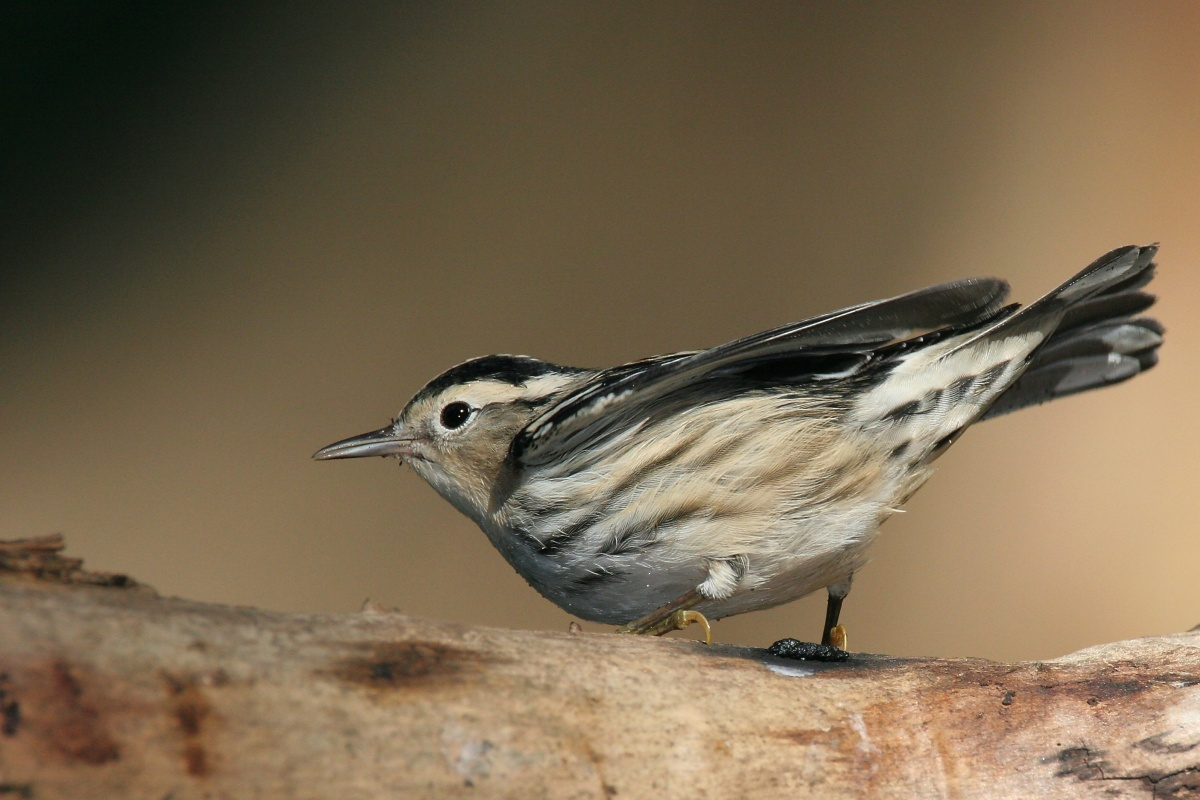
Black-and-white warbler, a species on the BBRC's list

The committee keeps the list of species it considers under review and, from time to time, makes changes. These are usually because species have increased in frequency and no longer meet the numerical criteria for inclusion. A species is removed if it has more than 150 records in the preceding ten years, with ten or more in at least eight of those years. Different criteria were used in a review in 2006 (see below). There have been three major "purges" of species since the committee's formation. The first was soon after the committee's formation, in 1963, when 16 species were removed: red-crested pochard, snow goose, pectoral sandpiper, Mediterranean gull, Sabine's gull, melodious warbler, icterine warbler, yellow-browed warbler, northern goshawk, golden eagle, red kite, Kentish plover, crested tit, bearded tit, marsh warbler and Dartford warbler. Records of the last eight species had been considered only outside their "normal" British range (e.g. crested tits outside Scotland, and red kites outside Wales). Kentish Plover was readmitted in 2020 following the loss of breeding populations in both the UK and nearby continental Europe leading to a massive decline in records. The second was in 1982, when ten further species were removed: Cory's shearwater, purple heron, white stork, buff-breasted sandpiper, Richard's pipit, tawny pipit, Savi's warbler, aquatic warbler, serin and common rosefinch. Savi's warbler was re-admitted to the committee's list in 1998, due to declining numbers of occurrences, with Tawny Pipit and Aquatic Warbler being reinstated in 2015. Thirdly, in 2006, a further 17 species were dropped from the list: ferruginous duck, Wilson’s petrel, great white egret, black kite, red-footed falcon, American golden plover, white-rumped sandpiper, white-winged black tern, alpine swift, red-rumped swallow, red-throated pipit, subalpine warbler, greenish warbler, dusky warbler, Radde's warbler, Arctic redpoll and rustic bunting. Their selection was based on different criteria from those previously used: more than 200 records in Britain ever, and more than 100 occasions in the last decade. Of the 17 species that were removed in the 2006 purge, three have been reinstated - Ferruginous Duck in 2017, and Red-throated Pipit and Rustic Bunting in 2015.

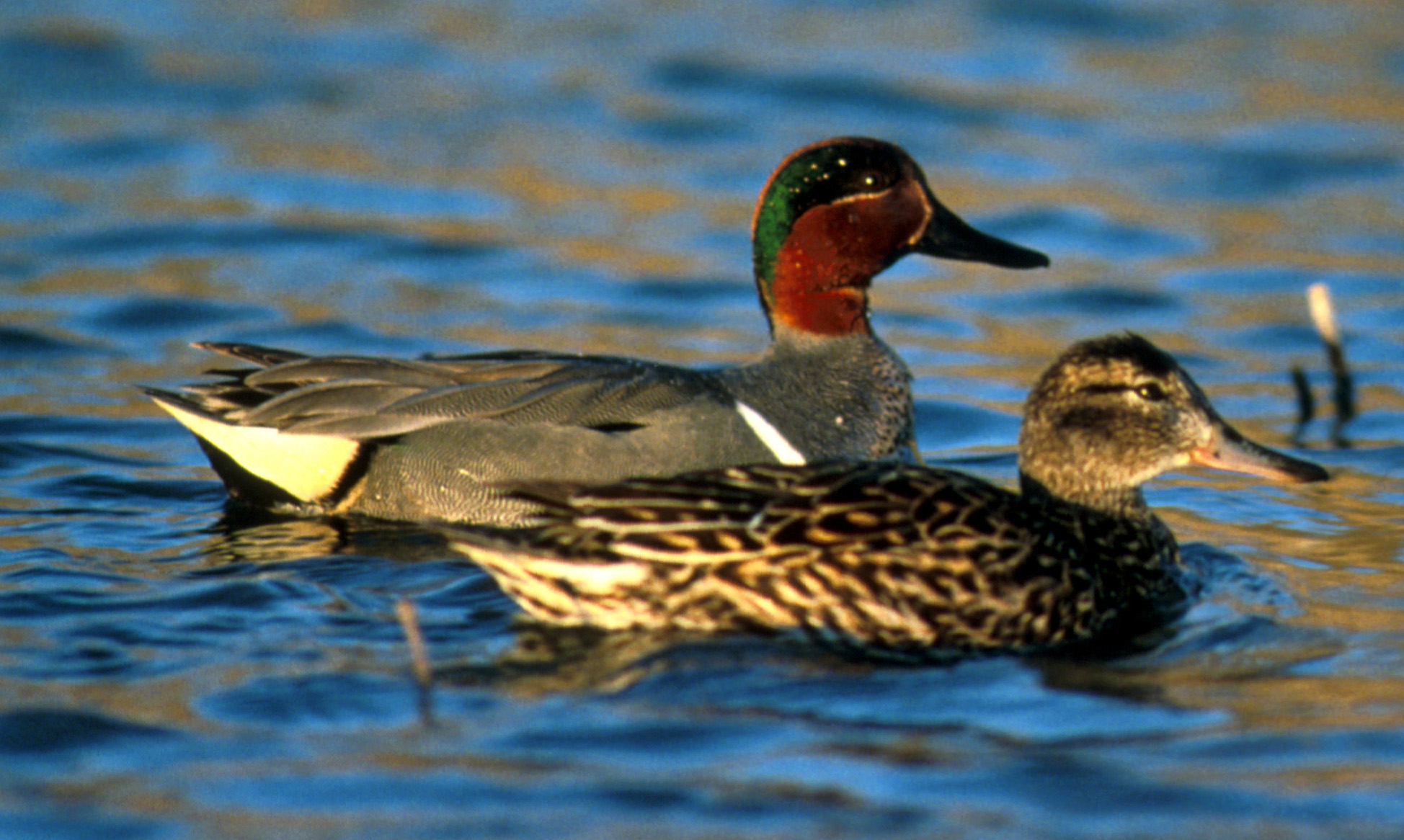
Green-winged teal, a species formerly considered by BBRC, but now occurring too regularly to meet its rarity criteria

Many other species and subspecies have been removed over the years: Cetti's warbler (in 1976); long-tailed skua (in 1979); common crane and ring-billed gull (in 1987); surf scoter, little egret, European bee-eater, Pallas's warbler and woodchat shrike (in 1990); green-winged teal (in 1992); ring-necked duck, greater short-toed lark and little bunting (in 1993); white-tailed eagle and Kumlien's gull (in 1998); American wigeon, black-crowned night heron and rose-coloured starling (in 2001); and black brant (in 2005).

Until 2009, the parrot crossbill was an anomaly, in that it was on the committee's list of species, even though a breeding population existed in Scotland. In 2009, this species was removed, along with white-billed diver and cattle egret. Latter removals included Glossy Ibis and Olive-backed Pipit in 2013, Lesser Scaup, Citrine Wagtail and Blyth's Reed Warbler in 2015 (although Lesser Scaup was reinstated in 2020), Black-winged Stilt and Red-flanked Bluetail in 2017, and Lesser Yellowlegs and Arctic Warbler in 2019.

In 2021, for the first time, White-spotted Bluethroat became the first taxon to be added to the BBRC list that hadn't previously been removed (except British firsts).

Once removed, a species is classed as a "scarce migrant": British Birds publishes a separate annual report summarising the occurrence of these species, and the data is also presented on the Scarce Migrants website. Aside from breeding species, Cetti's warbler, little egret, long-tailed skua, Mediterranean gull, Cattle Egret, Great White Egret and Yellow-browed Warbler have become so common that they no longer qualify even as scarce migrants.

== Structure and personnel ==
The committee has ten voting members, a chairman (who may be one of the ten, or may be another, non-voting individual) and a non-voting secretary. BBRC was assisted in its assessment of seabird records by a Seabirds Advisory Panel from 1987 to 1996. In 1999, the BBRC set up the "RIACT" (Racial Identification Amongst Changing Taxonomy) group to advise on how records of rare subspecies should be treated. RIACT published its first report in 2006, setting out the subspecies it believed were sufficiently diagnosable, and that occurred infrequently enough to justify being assessed by the rarities committee. Prior to this, a partial selection of rare subspecies had been routinely included in BBRC reports; the RIACT report aimed to bring consistency to the selection for future years. When a record is of a species not previously recorded in Britain in a wild state, BBRC deals with assessment of the bird's identification, then passes the record to the British Ornithologists' Union Records Committee, which decides whether the species should be included on the BOU's British Bird list.

The committee has two permanent posts, a Chairman and a Secretary: they are appointed by the board of British Birds. There had been no fixed term for these appointments before 2008, however, a three-year fixed term, with a limit of ten years, was introduced with the change of chairman in that year. The current chairman, the committee's seventh, is Adam Rowlands; the six previous chairmen were Philip Hollom (1959–72), Ian Wallace (1972–76), Peter J. Grant (1976–86), Peter Lansdown (1986–93), Rob Hume (1993–97) and Colin Bradshaw (1997–2008). The committee's secretary is Nigel Hudson, appointed in 2007. Its previous secretaries were G. A. Pyman (1959–61), Christopher M. Swaine (1961–63), Denzil D. Harber (1963–66), F. R. Smith (1966–75), J. N. Dymond (1975–77), J. O'Sullivan (1977–78) and Mike Rogers (1978–2006).

At least one (usually the longest-serving) record-assessing member retires every year, to balance experience with "new blood". The committee usually nominates its own replacement candidate, but also invites nominations from others, and if any are received, holds an election among county bird recorders and the bird observatory network. A set of criteria for membership has been developed—currently, these are "a widely acknowledged expertise in identification, proven reliability in the field, a track record of high quality submissions of descriptions of scarce and rare birds to county records committees and BBRC, considerable experience of record assessment, the capacity to handle the considerable volume of work involved in assessing upwards of 1,000 records per year and the capacity to work quickly and efficiently". The following 69 individuals have served on BBRC in a records assessment capacity:

- Horace Alexander (1959–63)
- Chris Batty (since 2007)
- D. Graham Bell (1962–76)
- A. R. M. Blake (1963–76)
- Chris G. Bradshaw (since 2006)
- Colin Bradshaw (1990–97)
- Phil Bristow (2003–2009)
- Dave Britton (1980–90)
- Alan Brown (1987–95)
- Graham P. Catley (1990–95)
- Peter Clement (1990–97)
- Peter Davis (1963–75)
- Alan Dean (1984–92)
- Lance Degnan (since 2004)
- Roy H. Dennis (1967–87)
- J. Nick Dymond (1975–77)
- Pete Ellis (1991–99)
- James Ferguson-Lees (1959–63)
- Paul French (since 2008)
- Steve Gantlett (1987–94)
- Martin Garner (since 2006)
- Peter J. Grant (1969–86)
- Denzil Dean Harber (1959–66)
- Nic Hallam (since 2009)
- Paul Harvey (1997–2007)
- A. Hazelwood (1959–61)
- Chris Heard (1989–96)
- Philip Hollom (1959–72)
- Dave Holman (1976–85)
- Rob Hume (1988–97)
- Tim Inskipp (1979–89)
- Ron Johns (1972–79)
- Peter Lansdown (1983–90)
- James Lidster (since 2005)
- Brian Little (1976–82)
- Steve Madge (1977–88)
- John H. Marchant (1986–93)
- John Martin (1997–2007)
- John Mather (1976–84)
- John McLoughlin (1996–2006)
- Howard Medhurst (1959)
- M. F. M. Meiklejohn (1959–69)
- Richard Millington (since 2009)
- I. C. T. Nisbet (1959–63)
- Doug Page (1995–2005)
- Mike Pennington (since 2007)
- Richard Porter (1981–84)
- G. A. Pyman (1959–70)
- R. J. Raines (1975–81)
- Richard A. Richardson (1969–76)
- Iain S. Robertson (1984–90)
- Adam Rowlands (since 1999)
- R. F. Ruttledge (1959–60)
- Tim Sharrock (1969–83)
- Ken D. Shaw (1994–2002)
- Brian J. Small (2001–2009)
- F. R. Smith (1966–75)
- K. D. Smith (1960–61)
- Jimmy G. Steele (1997–2006)
- Andy M. Stoddart (1993–2001)
- Christopher M. Swaine (1961–63)
- John J. Sweeney (since 2002)
- Reg I. Thorpe (1995–2004)
- Keith E. Vinicombe (1982–91)
- Reginald Wagstaffe (1962–70)
- Grahame Walbridge (1992–2003)
- Ian Wallace (1963–68, 1971–75)
- G. A. Williams (1975–80)
- Kenneth Williamson (1959–63)

A number of other individuals have served as the committee's statisticians, museum consultants, archivists and avicultural consultants, or on the Seabirds Advisory Panel or RIACT.

The committee has stated that it has a desire to be made up of members of "all age ranges and both sexes"; however, all BBRC members to date have been male, a fact reflected in the nickname "the ten rare men". Measures exist to ensure that the committee has a geographic balance amongst its membership—BBRC's constitution states that it "should attempt to provide a reasonable geographical spread with members having a detailed knowledge of each of the following areas: Wales, Scotland, Northern England, the Midlands, the Southwest and the Southeast of England".

Documentation of records, including the members' deliberations, are kept in the committee’s archives, which are deposited with the British Trust for Ornithology. Some older data is missing, as the committee's files were originally held by the editors of British Birds, and they were not transferred to the new owners of the magazine when it was sold in the 1960s.

== Annual report and other publications ==
The committee publishes an annual report on the rare birds occurring each year, in British Birds. This has usually been in the issue published in November of the following year, although the 2007 Report appeared in the October 2008 issue, and the committee has said that it plans to keep to this new timescale in future years.

The report typically begins with an introduction, summarising the most significant birds occurring during the year, and discussing any current issues relating to the committee's work. This is followed by a list of accepted records in taxonomic sequence. Records for each taxon are listed by county, followed by comments about its occurrence during the year. Late-accepted records and decisions to reject a previously identified record are included. This section of the report contains painted illustrations and photographs of some of the birds. The report lists records that have not been accepted, often noting the most significant that remain under consideration.

The committee also publishes frequent "Rarities Committee news" items (previously called "Rarities Committee news and announcements") in British Birds.

== Record reviews ==
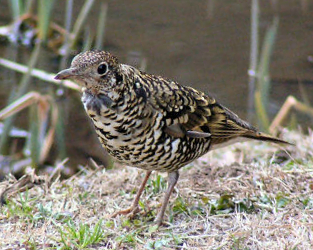
White's thrush, another species on the BRRC list

BBRC reviews 1200 to 1500 records each year (when it was first set up, the figure was around 200 per year). Of these, approximately 85% are accepted: this acceptance rate has remained steady for many years. Species that have caused particular problems include black kite, great snipe, gyrfalcon, gull-billed tern, and North Atlantic little shearwater. Peter Grant estimated that, during his tenure as chairman, approximately 2% of accepted records are incorrectly accepted, and 5% are incorrectly rejected.

Wallace (1973) addressed a number of criticisms of the committee including that it provides too little information on the reasons for rarity rejection. Alan Vittery and Sara McMahon have both argued that the committee should inform observers whose records are rejected of the committee's reasons for doing so. This view also has the support of the editor of Birdwatch, Dominic Mitchell, who has made this the topic of editorials on a number of occasions.

BBRC has from time to time published material illustrating its assessment process in an attempt to explain to a wider audience how it arrives at its decisions. Much of these have appeared in a series called "From the Rarities Committees files" in British Birds magazine. Another short series was published in Birdwatch magazine: entitled "You: The Jury", it featured six fictitious rarity accounts, with, in the subsequent issue, accounts from two rarities committee members stating how they would vote.

=== Re-reviews ===
From time to time, BBRC has re-reviewed records that it previously accepted, to ensure they are acceptable in the light of improved knowledge of the species in question. These reviews are carried out on a species-by-species basis. Old World warblers have proved particularly in need of re-review. A review of greenish warbler records was initiated in 1983. The purpose of this review was to establish whether records, particular those in late autumn and winter, of drab grey Phylloscopus warblers, which had previously been accepted as greenish warbler, were in fact this species, or were common chiffchaffs of the Siberian race tristis. 48 records between 1958 and 1970 were examined. Of these, 20 were rejected. A review of Arctic warbler records was begun in 1991, with the aim of determining whether any greenish warblers had been mistakenly accepted as Arctics. The review was completed in 1994, although as of 2009, the results had not been published.

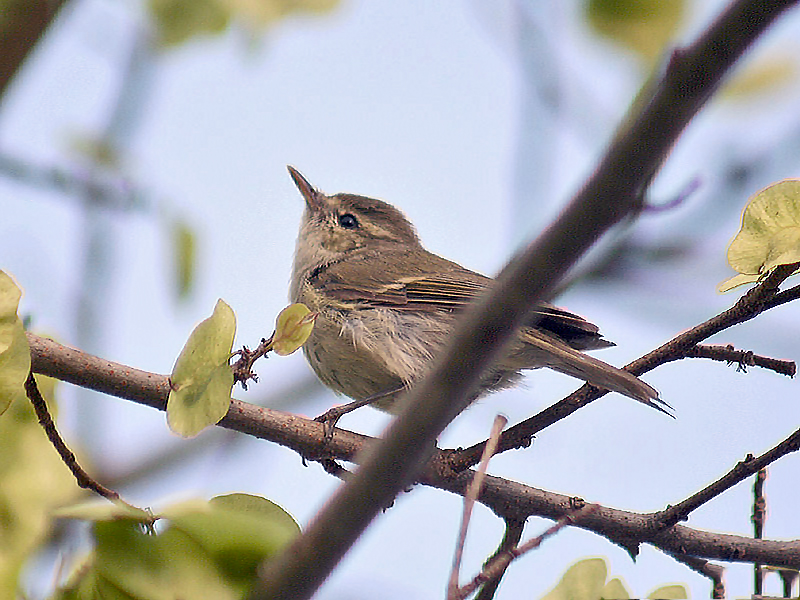
Greenish warbler, a species with a history of misidentification

A review of spectacled warbler records was initiated in 1984. This review resulted in the species being removed from the British list; of the three accepted records, one, at Spurn, Yorkshire in 1968, was re-identified as a first-year female subalpine warbler, while descriptions of the other two, at Porthgwarra, Cornwall in October 1969 and on Fair Isle in June 1979, were not considered sufficiently watertight to permit their continued acceptance. Spectacled warbler has since been re-added to the British list following an individual at Filey, Yorkshire in 1992, and there have been further subsequent records. In the late 1990s, BBRC reviewed some of the accepted records of moustached warbler, and concluded that one, from Sussex in 1979, was unacceptable, but that one other, from Buckinghamshire in 1965, should stand. Two further records, from Hampshire in 1951 and Kent in 1952, were reviewed as part of the 1950–1957 review (see below), and found to be unacceptable. Following these rejections, the Buckinghamshire record, and the remaining record, a breeding pair in Cambridgeshire in 1946, previously accepted as Britain's first, were scrutinised by the BOURC and found to be unacceptable, leading to the removal of moustached warbler from the British list; it has not re-occurred.

A review of olivaceous warbler records commenced in 1986, and continued through the 1990s. The results of this review were published in 1999: six of the previously accepted records were rejected as not meeting modern identification standards. In 2003, following the split of olivaceous warbler into two species, the accepted records were all reviewed again to ascertain which of the two they were—all nine proved to be eastern olivaceous warblers. Following the split of Bonelli's warbler into two species, the committee reviewed all the 121 accepted records, and concluded that 51 were western and two were eastern; for the remainder, not enough evidence was available to make a firm decision. The committee had previously stated that it would regard as western Bonelli's warbler all except proven eastern Bonelli's warblers, however, this announcement rescinded that decision. In 2003–04, all desert warbler records were reviewed, and it was concluded that all were referable to the newly split Asian desert warbler, rather than African desert warbler.

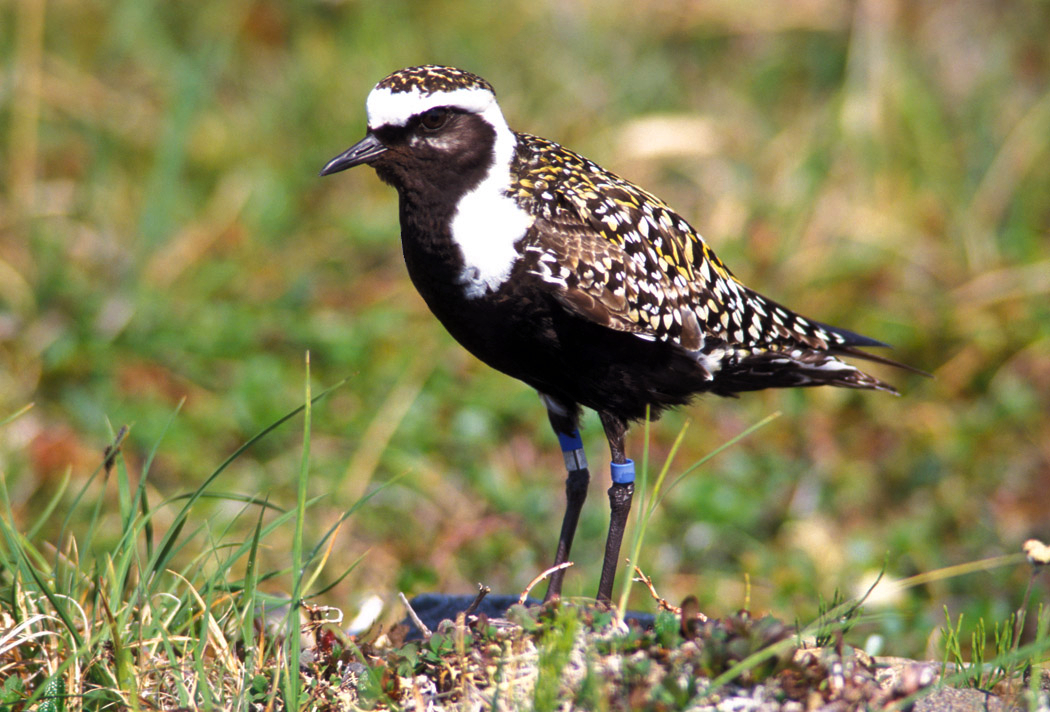
American golden plover, one member of a closely related and difficult-to-identify species pair

A review of American and Pacific golden plover records was begun in 1991, with the purpose of evaluating whether any individuals previously accepted as "either American or Pacific" could now be definitely assigned to one species or the other (and vice versa). The results (a small decrease in the number of accepted American golden plovers, and a small increase in the number of accepted Pacifics) were published in the committee's report for 1996, with a comment that a detailed paper on the subject was being prepared, although as of 2009, this has not been published. A review of isabelline shrike records commenced in 1986. This review, the results of which were published in 1989, established a racial identification for a number of adult isabelline shrikes previously accepted to species level. A further review, with the same aim, was begun in the late 1990s. A preliminary set of results of this review was published in 2003; four previously accepted individuals were rejected, including one, in Cambridgeshire in 1978, which is now thought have been a hybrid with red-backed shrike. The full results of this second review were published in 2007; some of the previous racial attributions were withdrawn, but the committee felt able to confidently assign a race for a number of more recent individuals, although it stressed that this could only be done with adult birds (the committee's 2005 report mentions that a further article is in preparation). A review of black-eared wheatears was conducted in 2002–04, with the aim of assigning individuals to the eastern and western races where possible; this was possible with nine records; both western hispanica and eastern melanoleuca were shown to have occurred.

A review of semipalmated sandpiper records took place in the 1970s, resulting in seven of the twelve records being rejected. A review of black-headed wagtail records was initiated in 1983. The results were published in 1994 and 1995, and nine previously accepted records were judged to be unsound, due to possible confusion with grey-headed wagtail. A review of rufous turtle dove records took place in 1994, and concluded that three of the eight accepted records should no longer stand. A review of lesser kestrel records, begun in 1994, and completed in 1995, concluded that six accepted records of this species should no longer be regarded as acceptable. Five of the six were from autumn, whereas the overwhelming majority of records the committee continued to accept are from the spring/summer period. All 24 spring records of Siberian stonechat were reconsidered in 2002–04, in the light of new information on the variability in appearance of European stonechats in spring; the committee decided that all but five should remain accepted. In 2003, the committee revised its assessment criteria for male pine buntings, redefining some birds previously considered hybrids as acceptable, but requiring an overall greater level of precision in descriptions, and reviewed past records in the light of these changes.

As of 2017, the following reviews are underway: a review of past records of Macaronesian shearwaters, reviews of all claimed Nearctic cackling goose records, a review of great white egrets to establish if any are of the Nearctic race, a review of sandplovers, a review of records of the eastern race of common redstart, a review of Orphean warbler records aimed at determining the race of each, and a review of subalpine warblers to determine which individuals are ascribable to the race albistriata. It has also been suggested that reviews should be conducted of records of great snipe, as older records show a very different temporal occurrence pattern than more recent birds, the large numbers of gull-billed tern records from the English south coast from the 1960s, and desert wheatears, to establish racial identifications.

=== Problematic records ===
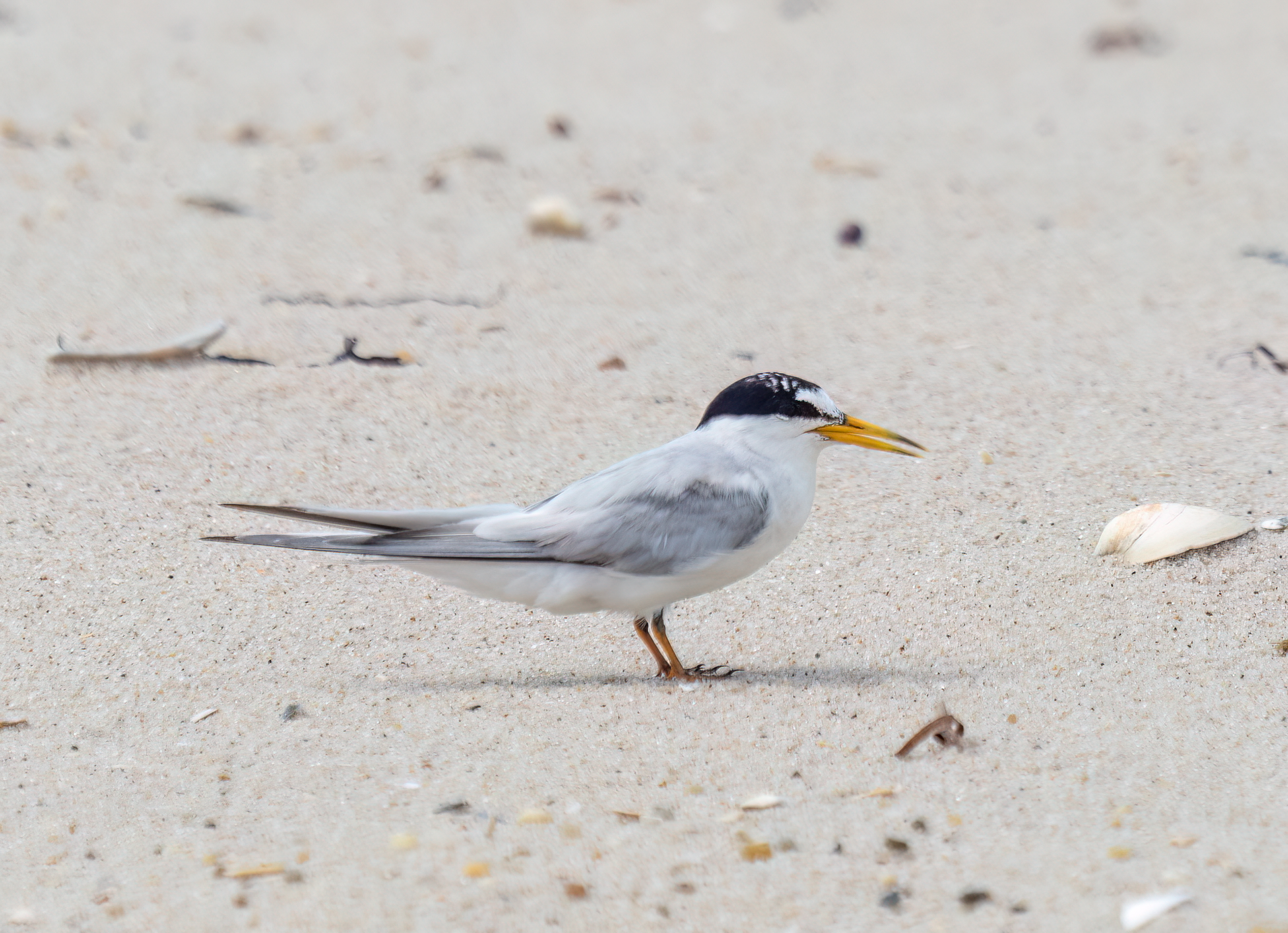
Least tern, a species seen just once in Britain

Most records received by the committee are processed within a year and published in its annual report in British Birds. Some records prove problematic, and for some species, it has taken the committee many years to come to a decision. This has particularly been the case where the species or subspecies in question was new to Britain—examples include northern harrier (Britain's first, in Scilly in 1982, accepted in 2007), long-toed stint (Britain's first, in Cornwall in 1970, accepted in 1994), least tern (Britain's first, and to date only record, accepted in 2005, after first occurring in 1983), black lark (Britain's first, from Spurn, Yorkshire in 1984, accepted in 2004 after a second set of notes came to light), Sykes's warbler (the first three records, from 1959, 1977, and 1993, accepted in 2003), Iberian chiffchaff (the first two records, from 1972 and 1992, accepted in 2000), and Hume's leaf warbler (the first 27 records, the earliest from 1966, accepted in 1998). Occasionally, decisions have been delayed due to non-ornithological factors, such as the loss by the Royal Mail of a file on Britain's first lesser short-toed lark.

The first three field records of Blyth's pipit, including an atypical pale individual on the Isles of Scilly, proved difficult, but following the occurrence of trapped individuals, on Fair Isle in 1993 and Suffolk in 1994, these were accepted. Some records of citrine wagtail and short-toed treecreeper were accepted only after prolonged consideration. Prior to the publication in 1984 of Jonsson and Grant's stint identification paper, a number of stints (Calidris) proved difficult to assess; a paper covering four such cases was published in 1986. It included accounts of a bird on Fair Isle, originally thought Britain's first red-necked stint that turned out to be a sanderling; and a bird in Suffolk, The "Felixstowe stint", which most observers at the time believed was a western sandpiper, but was in fact a semipalmated sandpiper. A previous paper details four early claims of red-necked stint, none of which were acceptable.

As of 2007, records of Wilson's snipe (from 1985 and 1998), elegant terns (from 2002), a number of eastern whitethroats and lesser whitethroats, and several apparent North African common chaffinches, are still under consideration.

==== Problematic seabird records ====
BBRC has had particular problems with a number of rare seabirds. The "Chalice petrel", a dark-rumped storm petrel seen and photographed in the Southwest Approaches in 1988, and believed by its observers to be a Matsudaira's storm petrel, was eventually rejected as other similar species could not be ruled out. Martin Garner and Killian Mullarney subsequently wrote a critical review of this decision, arguing that the evidence points to the bird having been a Swinhoe's storm petrel, the only dark-rumped storm petrel species otherwise recorded in the North Atlantic. They argued that the Seabirds Advisory Panel's assessment of the record was at fault, and a critical reappraisal of the evidence should have been prompted by the (then relatively recent) discovery in the North Atlantic of Swinhoe's storm petrel, and that the committee was instead too heavily swayed by the views of a single expert.

A petrel seen from Dungeness, Kent and believed by its observers to be Britain's first herald petrel was rejected, although the committee noted that the bird was clearly "an amazing seabird". This decision sparked a number of letters to British Birds questioning whether the committee's stance is too strict. Fea's petrel is now officially accepted as having occurred, but for many years, the identification of these birds was accepted only as Fea's/Zino's/soft-plumaged petrel, followed by a period where they were referred to Fea's or Zino's; however, following BOURC acceptance of two birds in Scilly waters as Fea's petrels, BBRC published a paper arguing that all birds are likely to have been Fea's.

The occurrence in Britain of southern (i.e. south polar/brown) skuas is also unresolved. A series of reports of south polar skua, from 1982 to 1993, were all eventually rejected after being assessed for several years. Two other birds (from the Isles of Scilly in 2001, and Glamorgan in 2002 have been accepted (by the BOURC) as belonging to one or other of these two species, while a bird from Dorset in 1996 remains under consideration.

==== Criticisms of level of detail required and approach to single-observer records ====
In 1996, Alan Vittery raised the question of whether the level of detail required by the committee for a description to be acceptable was too high. Similar points were made by Keith Vinicombe and Mike Pennington in 2001. In the light of the rejection of a record of Blyth's reed warbler in Shetland in 1997, Vinicombe and Pennington wrote to British Birds to question the decision. They suggested that the committee was becoming too focussed on minutiae in assessing bird descriptions, ignoring more obvious evidence, Vinicombe saying that "the Committee has prevaricated to the point where it 'cannot see the wood for the trees'". David Walker and Owen Leyshon, David Ferguson, and Andrew Duff have criticised the committee on similar grounds in relation to its approach to the assessment of rare seabirds, citing the Dungeness herald petrel claim as an example. Vittery, and Moss Taylor both expressed concern that BBRC was adopting too strict an approach for records of birds seen only by their finder.

In 1998, BBRC explained its approach to the assessment of single-observer records. The committee explained that while it understood that geographical and social circumstances make it likely that some people are more likely to find rare birds on their own, it is "very cautious about observers with a high proportion of single-observer records" and that its policy is to watch patterns closely and review those observers' past records on a regular basis. This approach has attracted criticism. Former BBRC chairman Ian Wallace and others have written about the subject in Birdwatch magazine. Wallace believes that the committee has a blacklist of observers, from whom it automatically rejects records unless there are other observers able to corroborate the sighting. He mentions two specific observers, both of whom live in remote parts of northern Scotland. Ken Shaw, a former BBRC member, has claimed that BBRC would not accept a single-observer record of a species new to Britain without photographic evidence, regardless of the track record of the observer. Graham Bell, another former member, writing in response to Shaw's article, has accused the committee of adopted unfounded suspicions, arguing that just because a competent observer moves to an underwatched part of the country, their abilities do not change. One of the observers who Wallace claimed was blacklisted, Alan Vittery, also contributed to the debate, stating that he had been informed by the BBRC that they would not consider any single-observer record he submitted, unless supported by a photograph. Vittery contrasted the BBRC's attitude with that of other national rarities committees, arguing that the result of the approach is to distort rarity statistics. Vittery invited the BBRC to reply in public, but this request was declined.

=== The Druridge Bay curlew ===
The BBRC conducted a detailed review into the controversial identification of a curlew seen at Druridge Bay in Northumberland in 1998, coming to the conclusion that it was, as had been believed by many observers, a first-summer slender-billed curlew. This identification was accepted by the British Ornithologists Union's Records Committee, leading to the addition of this species to the British List. The record was reviewed in 2014, and, after a split decision by both the BBRC and the BOURC, the record was found not proven and subsequently removed from the British List.

=== Review of 1950–57 records including an Ascension frigatebird sighting ===
A subcommittee was set up in 1997 to undertake a review of rare bird records from the years immediately prior to BBRC's establishment. The purpose of the review was to ensure that all records from 1950 onwards (the cut-off date for Category A of the BOU British List of birds) have been subjected to a similar level of scrutiny. Not all of the 1,100 records of species considered to be rarities at that time were assessed, but only those related to species not recorded more than 100 times by 1997, as well as a few records of less rare species under particularly unusual circumstances, which were termed "sore thumbs". Much of the original documentation was unavailable for the review, as it had been lost, and so for many records, the review was based solely on published accounts of the birds. The most notable outcome of this review was the reidentification of a frigatebird record from Tiree in 1953. Previously identified as a magnificent frigatebird, the BBRC review concluded that the bird was in fact an Ascension frigatebird, the only individual of this species ever identified in Europe (Walbridge, Small & McGowan 2003). The full results of the review were published in 2006. Of the 126 records reviewed, 37 were rejected as unacceptable. These included a claimed white-tailed eagle, which broke into a chicken-run in a garden and stole a chicken, three little crakes, three Eurasian scops owls, the only late December record of tawny pipit, three black-eared wheatears, a record of two White's thrushes together in April, a spring lanceolated warbler, two moustached warblers and a pine grosbeak. Furthermore, issues were found with the identification of Britain's first western sandpiper, on Fair Isle in 1956, and these led the BOURC to reject this record. The western sandpiper has been recorded several times subsequently in Britain however, and remains on the national list. The subcommittee's final report also hints at the prospect that some records from immediately prior to 1950 may be incorrect; because these fell outside the timeframes of the review they were not reassessed.

=== The Chipping Ongar hermit thrush ===
Only a single known hoax involving a record submitted to BBRC has become public. In autumn 1994, Nigel Pepper, a birdwatcher from Essex, claimed to have recorded a hermit thrush in a garden in Chipping Ongar. Doubts about the record were raised in Birdwatch and BBRC reviewed the record in 2002, but decided that it should stand. In 2009, Nigel Pepper came clean and revealed in Birdwatch magazine (Birdwatch 204: 46-47) that the record was actually a hoax, made in protest at perceived suppression of rare bird records in the county. He revealed that the Hermit Thrush in question was actually photographed in Canada on a recent birdwatching trip.

== See also ==
- The Hastings Rarities
- The Rare Breeding Birds Panel

== Bibliography ==
=== Principal works ===
- BBRC, BBRC constitution (accessed 26 October 2007)
- Bradshaw, Colin, Paul Harvey and Jimmy Steele, on behalf of BBRC (2004) What does the British Birds Rarities Committee do? British Birds 97(6): 260–3
- Cocker, Mark (2001) Birders: Tales of a tribe ISBN 0-224-06002-3
- Dean, Alan R. (2007) The British Birds Rarities Committee: a review of its history, publications and procedures British Birds 100(3): 149–176
- Lansdown, P. G. (1987) Rare birds — the work of the British Birds Rarities Committee British Birds 80(10): 487–91
- Lansdown, P. G. (1993) Rare-bird recording and the Rarities Committee British Birds 86(9): 417–22
- Mairs, David (2003) The record breaker Birdwatch 131: 40–1 (an interview with Colin Bradshaw)
- Wallace, D. I. M. (1970) The first ten years of the Rarities Committee British Birds 63(3): 113–29
- Wallace, Ian (2004) Beguiled by Birds, pp. 97–105 ("The winding road of national review")
- Wallace, Ian (2005) Questions that won't go away Birdwatch 153: 19–20

=== Annual reports ===
- 1958: G. A. Pyman on behalf of the Rarity Records Committee (1960) Report on rare birds in Great Britain and Ireland in 1958 British Birds 53(4): 153–73
- 1959: G. A. Pyman on behalf of the Rarity Records Committee (1960) Report on rare birds in Great Britain and Ireland in 1959 British Birds 53(10): 409–31
- 1960: G. A. Pyman on behalf of the Rarity Records Committee (1961) Report on rare birds in Great Britain in i960 British Birds 54(5): 173–200
- 1961: C. M. Swaine on behalf of the Rarities Committee (1962) Report on rare birds in Great Britain in 1961 British Birds 55(12): 562–84
- 1962: D. D. Harber and C. M. Swaine on behalf of the Parities Committee (1963) Report on rare birds in Great Britain in 1962 British Birds 56(11): 393–409
- 1963: D. D. Harber and the Rarities Committee (1964) Report on rare birds in Great Britain in 1963 Archived 2012-04-21 at the Wayback Machine British Birds 57(7): 261–81
- 1964: D. D. Harber and the Rarities Committee (1965) Report on rare birds in Great Britain in 1964 British Birds 58(9): 353–72
- 1965: D. D. Harber and the Rarities Committee (1966) Report on rare birds in Great Britain in 1965 Archived 2012-04-21 at the Wayback Machine British Birds 59(7): 280–305
- 1966: F. R. Smith and the Rarities Committee (1967) Report on rare birds in Great Britain in 1966 British Birds 60(8): 309–38
- 1967: F. R. Smith and the Rarities Committee (1968) Report on rare birds in Great Britain in 1967 British Birds 61(8): 329–65
- 1968: F. R. Smith and the Rarities Committee (1969) Report on rare birds in Great Britain in 1968 British Birds 62(11): 457–92
- 1969: F. R. Smith and the Rarities Committee (1970) Report on rare birds in Great Britain in 1969 Archived 2012-04-21 at the Wayback Machine British Birds 63(7): 267–93
- 1970: F. R. Smith and the Rarities Committee (1971) Report on rare birds in Great Britain in 1970 British Birds 64(8): 339–71
- 1971: F. R. Smith and the Rarities Committee (1972) Report on rare birds in Great Britain in 1971 British Birds 65(8): 322–54
- 1972: F. R. Smith and the Rarities Committee (1973) Report on rare birds in Great Britain in 1972 British Birds 66(8): 331–60
- 1973: F. R. Smith and the Rarities Committee (1974) Report on rare birds in Great Britain in 1973 British Birds 67(8): 310–48
- 1974: F. R. Smith and the Rarities Committee (1975) Report on rare birds in Great Britain in 1974 British Birds 68(8): 306–38
- 1975: J. N. Dymond and the Rarities Committee (1976) Report on rare birds in Great Britain in 1975 British Birds 69(9): 321–68
- 1976: O'Sullivan, John and the Rarities Committee (1977) Report on rare birds in Great Britain in 1976 British Birds 70(10): 405–53
- 1977: Rogers, Michael J. and the Rarities Committee (1978) Report on rare birds in Great Britain in 1977 (PDF) British Birds 71(11): 481–532
- 1978: Rogers, Michael J. and the Rarities Committee (1979) Report on rare birds in Great Britain in 1978 (PDF) British Birds 72(11): 503–49
- 1979: Rogers, Michael J. and the Rarities Committee (1980) Report on rare birds in Great Britain in 1980. British Birds 73(11): 491–534
- 1980: Rogers, Michael J. and the Rarities Committee (1981) Report on rare birds in Great Britain in 1980. British Birds 74(11): 453–95
- 1981: Rogers, Michael J. and the Rarities Committee (1982) Report on rare birds in Great Britain in 1981. British Birds 75(11): 482–533
- 1982: Rogers, Michael J. and the Rarities Committee (1983) Report on rare birds in Great Britain in 1982 (PDF) British Birds 76(11): 476–529
- 1983: Rogers, Michael J. and the Rarities Committee (1984) Report on rare birds in Great Britain in 1983. British Birds 77(11): 506–62
- 1984: Rogers, Michael J. and the Rarities Committee (1985) Report on rare birds in Great Britain in 1984. British Birds 78(11): 529–89
- 1985: Rogers, Michael J. and the Rarities Committee (1986) Report on rare birds in Great Britain in 1985. British Birds 79(11): 526–88
- 1986: Rogers, Michael J. and the Rarities Committee (1987) Report on rare birds in Great Britain in 1986. British Birds 80(11): 516–71
- 1987: Rogers, Michael J. and the Rarities Committee (1988) Report on rare birds in Great Britain in 1987. British Birds 81(11): 535–96
- 1988: Rogers, Michael J. and the Rarities Committee (1989) Report on rare birds in Great Britain in 1988. British Birds 82(11): 505–63
- 1989: Rogers, Michael J. and the Rarities Committee (1990) Report on rare birds in Great Britain in 1989 (PDF) British Birds 83(11): 439–96
- 1990: Rogers, Michael J. and the Rarities Committee (1991) Report on rare birds in Great Britain in 1990 (PDF) British Birds 84(11): 449–505
- 1991: Rogers, Michael J. and the Rarities Committee (1992) Report on rare birds in Great Britain in 1991 (PDF) British Birds 85(10): 507–54
- 1992: Rogers, Michael J. and the Rarities Committee (1993) Report on rare birds in Great Britain in 1992 (PDF) British Birds 86(10): 447–540
- 1993: Rogers, Michael J. and the Rarities Committee (1994) Report on rare birds in Great Britain in 1993 (PDF) British Birds 87(11): 503–71
- 1994: Rogers, Michael J. and the Rarities Committee (1995) Report on rare birds in Great Britain in 1994 (PDF) British Birds 88(11): 493–558
- 1995: Rogers, Michael J. and the Rarities Committee (1996) Report on rare birds in Great Britain in 1995 (PDF) British Birds 89(11): 481–531
- 1996: Rogers, Michael J. and the Rarities Committee (1997) Report on rare birds in Great Britain in 1996 (PDF) British Birds 90(11): 453–522
- 1997: Rogers, Michael J. and the Rarities Committee (1998) Report on rare birds in Great Britain in 1997 (PDF) British Birds 91(11): 455–517
- 1998: Rogers, Michael J. and the Rarities Committee (1999) Report on rare birds in Great Britain in 1998 (PDF) British Birds 92(11): 554–609
- 1999: Rogers, Michael J. and the Rarities Committee (2000) Report on rare birds in Great Britain in 1999 (PDF) British Birds 93(11): 512–67
- 2000: Rogers, Michael J. and the Rarities Committee (2001) Report on rare birds in Great Britain in 2000 (PDF) British Birds 94(10): 452–504
- 2001: Rogers, Michael J. and the Rarities Committee (2002) Report on rare birds in Great Britain in 2001 (PDF) British Birds 95(10): 476–528
- 2002: Rogers, Michael J. and the Rarities Committee (2003) Report on rare birds in Great Britain in 2002 (PDF) British Birds 96(11): 542–609
- 2003: Rogers, Michael J. and the Rarities Committee (2004) Report on rare birds in Great Britain in 2003 (PDF) British Birds 97(11): 558–625
- 2004: Rogers, Michael J. and the Rarities Committee (2005) Report on rare birds in Great Britain in 2004 (PDF) British Birds 98(12): 628–94
- 2005: Fraser, P. A., Michael J. Rogers and the Rarities Committee (2007) Report on rare birds in Great Britain in 2005 part 1: non-passerines (PDF) British Birds 100(1): 16–61 and part 2: passerines (PDF) British Birds 100(2): 72–104
- 2006: Fraser, P. A. and the Rarities Committee (2006) Report on rare birds in Great Britain in 2006 Archived 2013-06-13 at the Wayback Machine. British Birds 100(12): 694–754
- 2007: Hudson, Nigel and the Rarities Committee (2008) Report on rare birds in Great Britain in 2007. British Birds 101(10): 516–577
- 2008: Hudson, Nigel and the Rarities Committee (2008) Report on rare birds in Great Britain in 2008 Archived 2013-06-13 at the Wayback Machine. British Birds 102(10): 528–601
- 2009: Hudson, Nigel and the Rarities Committee (2009) Report on rare birds in Great Britain in 2009. British Birds 102(10):
