= List of birding books =

The literature relating to birding is vast; however, certain books or series are regarded by the birding community as key milestones, setting standards of quality and influencing the development of birding literature, or birding itself. These works and their impact are dealt with on this page, in chronological order of publication. More information on each of the individual works can be found on their individual pages.

- Bird Neighbors (1897) by Neltje Blanchan was an early birding book which sold over 250,000 copies. It was illustrated with color photographs of stuffed birds.
- The Field Guide to the Birds by Roger Tory Peterson is regarded as the key birding book of the 20th century, due to its impact on the development and popularisation of birding.
- Atlas of Breeding Birds of the West Midlands, produced in 1970 by the West Midland Bird Club; the first modern bird atlas.
- The Birds of the Western Palearctic is a comprehensive regional avifauna for the Western Palearctic. It consists of 9 volumes, the first published in 1977 and the ninth in 1996. Its format and breadth influenced the development of regional avifaunas for other parts of the world, notably The Birds of Africa.
- The Helm Identification Guides are a series, originally produced by Christopher Helm, covering the identification of groups of birds at a worldwide scale. The first volume produced was Seabirds by Peter Harrison, published in 1983.
- The Macmillan Field Guides to Bird Identification are two small field guides. They adopt an unusual format, in that not all species in the geographical area of coverage are included; instead only groups of species which the authors regarded as difficult to identify are covered. Each such group is given a chapter, where identification is covered discursively rather than in the abbreviated form more usually used in a field guide. The publication of the first volume (covering Britain and Ireland) was the first time that this approach had been used in a European guide; the book undoubtedly had a major influence on improving the identification skills of birders in Britain during the 1990s.
- The publication of Charles Sibley & Jon Ahlquist's Phylogeny and Classification of Birds in 1990 brought a debate about the higher-level systematics of modern birds to the consciousness of birders. Sibley and Ahlquist proposed a radically different phylogenetic tree for birds, based on the results of DNA-DNA hybridisation studies. More details can be found in the article Sibley-Ahlquist taxonomy.
- Handbook of the Birds of the World is the first work to describe and illustrate all of the world's birds. It is currently in production.
- The Sibley Guide to Birds by David Allen Sibley was published in 2000, and was widely regarded as setting a new standard for field guides in North America.
- The Collins Bird Guide by Peter J. Grant and Lars Svensson was first published in 2000, and was received extremely warmly by birders. It deals with the birds of the bulk of the Western Palearctic.
- The Big Year, by Mark Obmascik, was an account of a year-long birding contest, later turned into a movie.
