= Steve Gantlett =

British birder

Stephen J. M. Gantlett is a British birder. He lives with his wife Sue in Cley-next-the-Sea, Norfolk. A qualified optician, SJMG retired from this profession in 1982 to become a full-time ornithologist.

He was the editor of Birding World magazine until it ceased production in January 2014. He also co-runs Birdline, a telephone information service containing news of rare birds, with Richard Millington.

Steve Gantlett is a twitcher. He is one of a small number of birders who have seen over 500 species in Britain.

He is a former member of the British Birds Rarities Committee.

Gantlett's specialism as an ornithologist is the advancement of bird identification. Among the areas of knowledge in which Gantlett has played a key role are the identification of orange-billed terns. He also (with Richard Millington) found the UK's first rock sparrow at Cley on 14 June 1981, still the only record in the UK. He has published papers on this subject in Birding World and in British Birds.
