= Martin Garner (ornithologist) =

British ornithologist

Martin S. Garner was an English ornithologist and Christian evangelist. He lived in Flamborough. He was married to Sharon Garner and they have two daughters, Emily and Abigail.

== Career ==
Evangelical work

Garner worked as a "Pioneer Evangelist" for the Wilson Carlile College of Evangelism, a centre for the training of Christian evangelists, run by the Church Army, an organisation within which he held the rank of captain. In February 2007, he wrote "A Call for Apostles Today" (ISBN 9781851746477), which argues that individual apostles, and groups, working in parallel with churches, are a more effective way of promoting Christianity than are churches alone. He was also the director of the Free Spirit Trust, an organisation promoting Christian missionary work, and jointly ran the "Great APEs" website, a website for "Apostles, Prophets and Evangelists".

Garner was commissioned by George Carey, the Archbishop of Canterbury in July 1991. He was commissioned as a member of the Church Army and admitted to the office of evangelist (certificate). Garner moved with his wife Sharon to Luton, Bedfordshire, where they began a new Christian community sometimes referred to as a church plant, meeting in a local primary school. The church grew quite rapidly to a membership of about 80 within 2 years. After two years the more traditional incumbent closed the work down and the church plant was unable to continue.

Having been offered several jobs the Garners moved to Northern Ireland to take a position with Lisburn Cathedral. The nature of the work was in an estate on the edge of the city of Lisburn. The estate, known as the Hillhall Estate, was locally familiar as a paramilitary area and one daubed with paramilitary insignia, typical of those in the area. After leaving Northern Ireland, the Garners moved to Sheffield.

== Charitable work ==
Garner began a charity (Freespirit) which provided a form of transparency and accountability. Three remits were declared that this charity was for the mentoring of other leaders, the continuing of the outreach work in the Sheffield area and the work overseas in central Africa, specifically Rwanda.

== Ornithology ==
His ornithological writing included articles for British Birds and Birding World magazines. He is credited with discovering the first British records of Caspian gull, in Essex in the 1990s. In 1997, with David Quinn and Bob Glover, Garner published a two-part paper in British Birds covering the identification of yellow-legged and Caspian gulls, which covered the former in far greater detail than any previous published work, and contained the first detailed English-language descriptions of the latter. His first bird-related book, Frontiers in Birding (ISBN 9781898110477), was published by BirdGuides Ltd. in 2008.

He created the Birding Frontiers website.

He also authored and published two further books – The Challenge Series – Autumn and The Challenge Series – Winter.

He was a member of the British Birds Rarities Committee.

== Death ==
Martin Garner died on 29 January 2016, aged 52, after a long battle with cancer.
