= Ifrane National Park =

National park in the Moyen Atlas mountains, Morocco

- IUCN category II (national park)
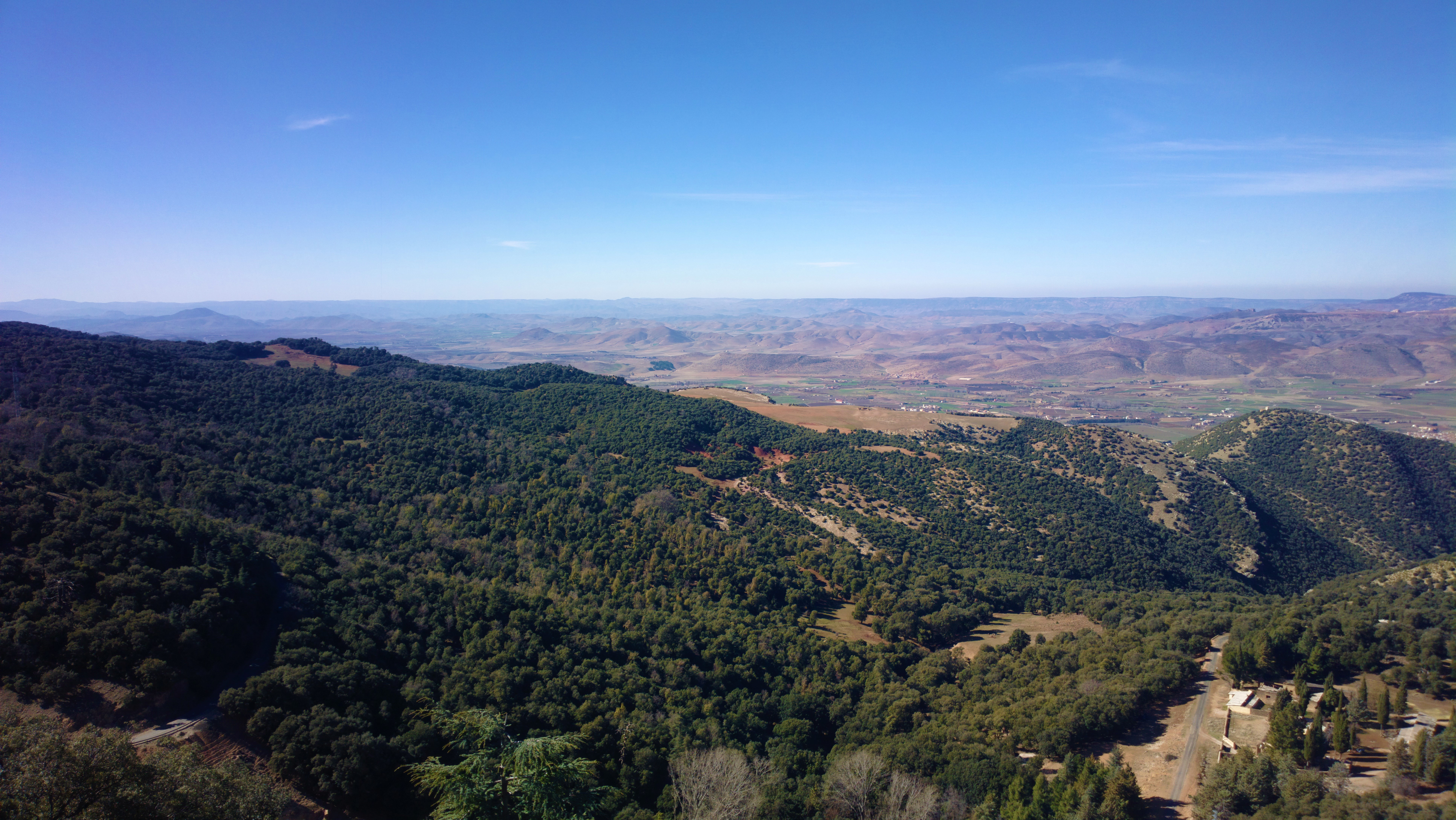
- Ifrane National Park From above
- Interactive map of Ifrane National Park
- Location: Morocco
- Coordinates: 33°25′54.32″N 5°7′48.58″W
- Area: 500 km^{2} (190 sq mi)

Ramsar Wetland
- Official name: Lac d'Afennourir
- Designated: 20 June 1980
- Reference no.: 208

Ifrane National Park is a national park located in the Middle Atlas mountain range of Morocco. Its territory extends over the western part of the mountains and areas within the provinces of Ifrane and Boulmane. It is one of the few remaining habitats for the Barbary macaque; A primate which prehistorically had a much broader range in North Africa, but currently survives as an endangered species in narrowly restricted areas fragmented habitats.

== History ==
Ifrane National Park was conceived in 1994 and established in October 2004 to protect important species and ecosystems, and because of increases in human activity and resource exploitation. Since the 1990s, Morocco has been involved in devising strategies to help protect the environment and biodiversity through projects and conventions such as Ramsar. Ifrane National Park is one of the ways that the Moroccan state came up with in order to demonstrate the importance of its forests and ecosystems.

The park initially covered an area of 53,800 ha (133,000 acres), and was enlarged in April 2008 to encompass some of the most ecologically sensitive areas such as wetlands and high-altitude forests.

In 2021, to celebrate World Biodiversity Day, several arruis (Barbary sheep) and crested porcupines were reintroduced to the park.

== Geography ==
The park covers an area of 125,000 hectares (310,000 acres). Much of it is forested with Atlas cedar. The altitude varies between 1,300 and 2,400 metres (4,300 and 7,900 ft) including the cedar forest located in the province of Ifrane. The park contains one tenth of the Atlas Cedar in the world, one fourth of the world's population of the Barbary Macaque, and two Ramsar sites: the two lakes Afennourir and Tifounassine. The former monastery of Toumliline is also located within the park.

=== Climate ===
Located in the Atlas Mountains, and affected by the cold north Atlantic current, Ifrane National Park has a continental-influenced warm-summer Mediterranean climate (Csb) with short, somewhat dry, warm summers and long, cool, damp winters. The nights can be severely cold in winter. The winter highs rarely exceed 10 °C (50 °F) in December–February.

Because of its elevation, the area experiences snow during the winter months and a cooler climate during the summer (not as hot as in the nearby regions).

Owing to the area's elevation and proximity to the north Atlantic Ocean, rainfall is very heavy whenever frontal systems affect the region. Precipitation patterns follow the classic Mediterranean range, from October to April. The park also receives high snowfall starting as early as October and lasting well into spring season. The annual average temperature does not exceed 11 °C (52 °F).

The city of Ifrane holds the record of the lowest temperature ever observed in Africa: −23.9 °C (−11.0 °F) on February 11, 1935.

Climate data for Ifrane, Morocco, 1961-1990 normals, extremes 1965-2016
| Month | Jan | Feb | Mar | Apr | May | Jun | Jul | Aug | Sep | Oct | Nov | Dec | Year |
|---|---|---|---|---|---|---|---|---|---|---|---|---|---|
| Record high °C (°F) | 20.0 (68.0) | 21.1 (70.0) | 22.0 (71.6) | 27.0 (80.6) | 27.2 (81.0) | 32.8 (91.0) | 34.0 (93.2) | 35.0 (95.0) | 37.0 (98.6) | 26.0 (78.8) | 19.0 (66.2) | 17.2 (63.0) | 37.0 (98.6) |
| Mean daily maximum °C (°F) | 8.9 (48.0) | 9.9 (49.8) | 11.9 (53.4) | 13.2 (55.8) | 17.5 (63.5) | 22.5 (72.5) | 28.7 (83.7) | 28.9 (84.0) | 24.7 (76.5) | 18.4 (65.1) | 12.5 (54.5) | 9.4 (48.9) | 17.2 (63.0) |
| Daily mean °C (°F) | 4.1 (39.4) | 5.2 (41.4) | 6.6 (43.9) | 8.0 (46.4) | 11.8 (53.2) | 15.9 (60.6) | 21.2 (70.2) | 21.4 (70.5) | 17.9 (64.2) | 12.5 (54.5) | 7.8 (46.0) | 4.7 (40.5) | 11.4 (52.5) |
| Mean daily minimum °C (°F) | −0.8 (30.6) | 0.5 (32.9) | 1.4 (34.5) | 2.8 (37.0) | 6.0 (42.8) | 9.4 (48.9) | 13.7 (56.7) | 13.9 (57.0) | 11.0 (51.8) | 6.6 (43.9) | 2.9 (37.2) | 0.0 (32.0) | 5.6 (42.1) |
| Record low °C (°F) | −13.0 (8.6) | −23.9 (−11.0) | −8.0 (17.6) | −3.9 (25.0) | −2.0 (28.4) | 0.0 (32.0) | 7.0 (44.6) | 4.0 (39.2) | 0.0 (32.0) | −1.1 (30.0) | −6.1 (21.0) | −10.0 (14.0) | −23.9 (−11.0) |
| Average precipitation mm (inches) | 138.9 (5.47) | 175.1 (6.89) | 126.1 (4.96) | 130.7 (5.15) | 76.7 (3.02) | 38.3 (1.51) | 13.6 (0.54) | 12.7 (0.50) | 33.3 (1.31) | 72.9 (2.87) | 178.3 (7.02) | 141.8 (5.58) | 1,118.4 (44.03) |
| Average rainy days | 10.6 | 12.4 | 12.1 | 12.4 | 10.3 | 6.5 | 3.8 | 4.2 | 6.5 | 8.4 | 10.8 | 10.3 | 108.3 |
| Mean monthly sunshine hours | 180.6 | 169.1 | 214.4 | 211.2 | 263.1 | 302.3 | 340.8 | 317.0 | 258.1 | 227.3 | 175.8 | 172.8 | 2,832.5 |
Source: NOAA

=== Flora and fauna ===
The area has 1015 different plant species including the Atlas cedar (Cedrus atlantica), the evergreen oak (Quercus ilex), the Algerian oak (Quercus canariensis), the maritime pine (Pinus pinaster), and the Spanish juniper (Juniperus thurifera). Other tree species that exist in the park include the Montpellier maple, the yew, and the holly.

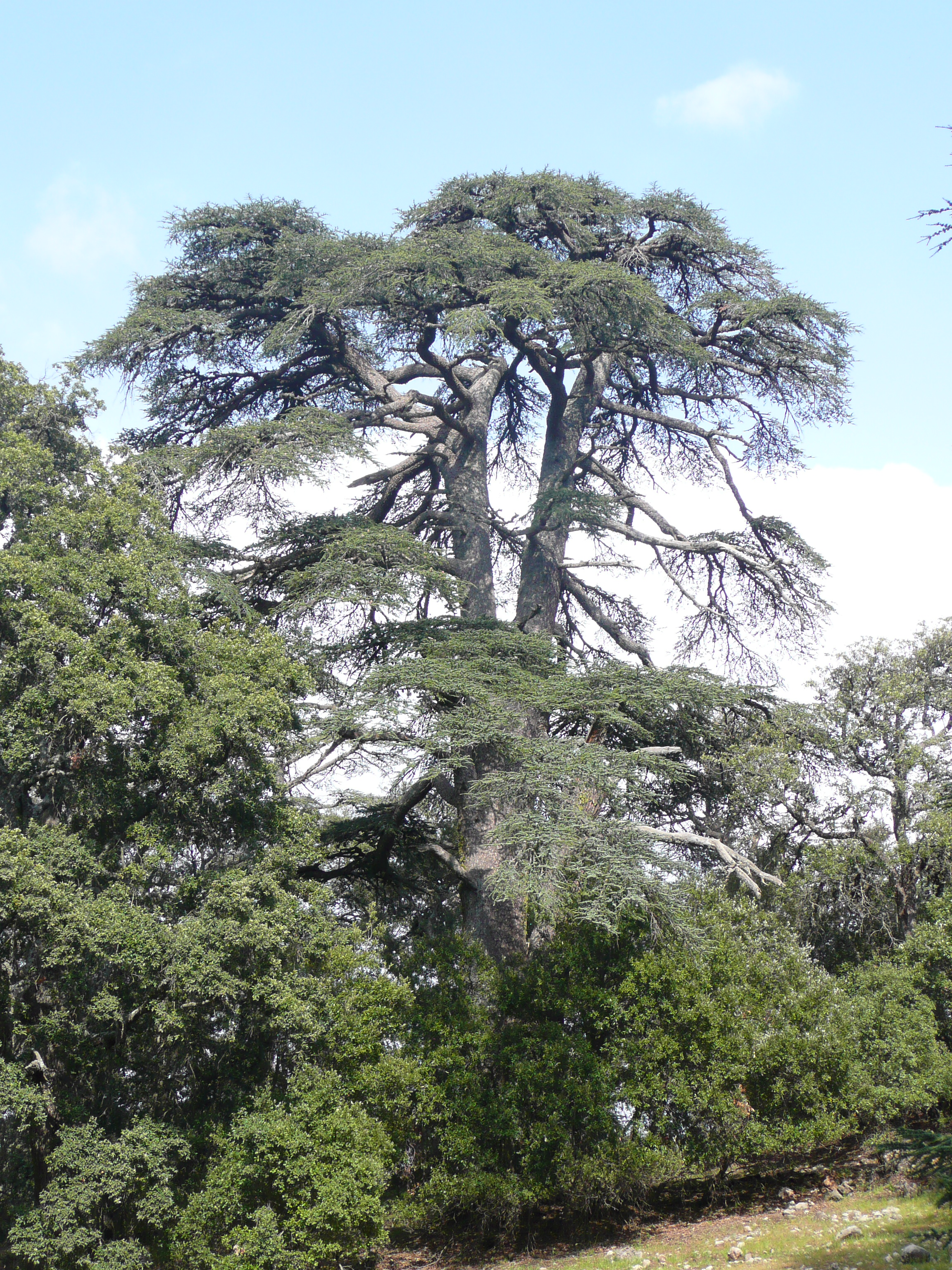
Cedrus atlantica in the Park

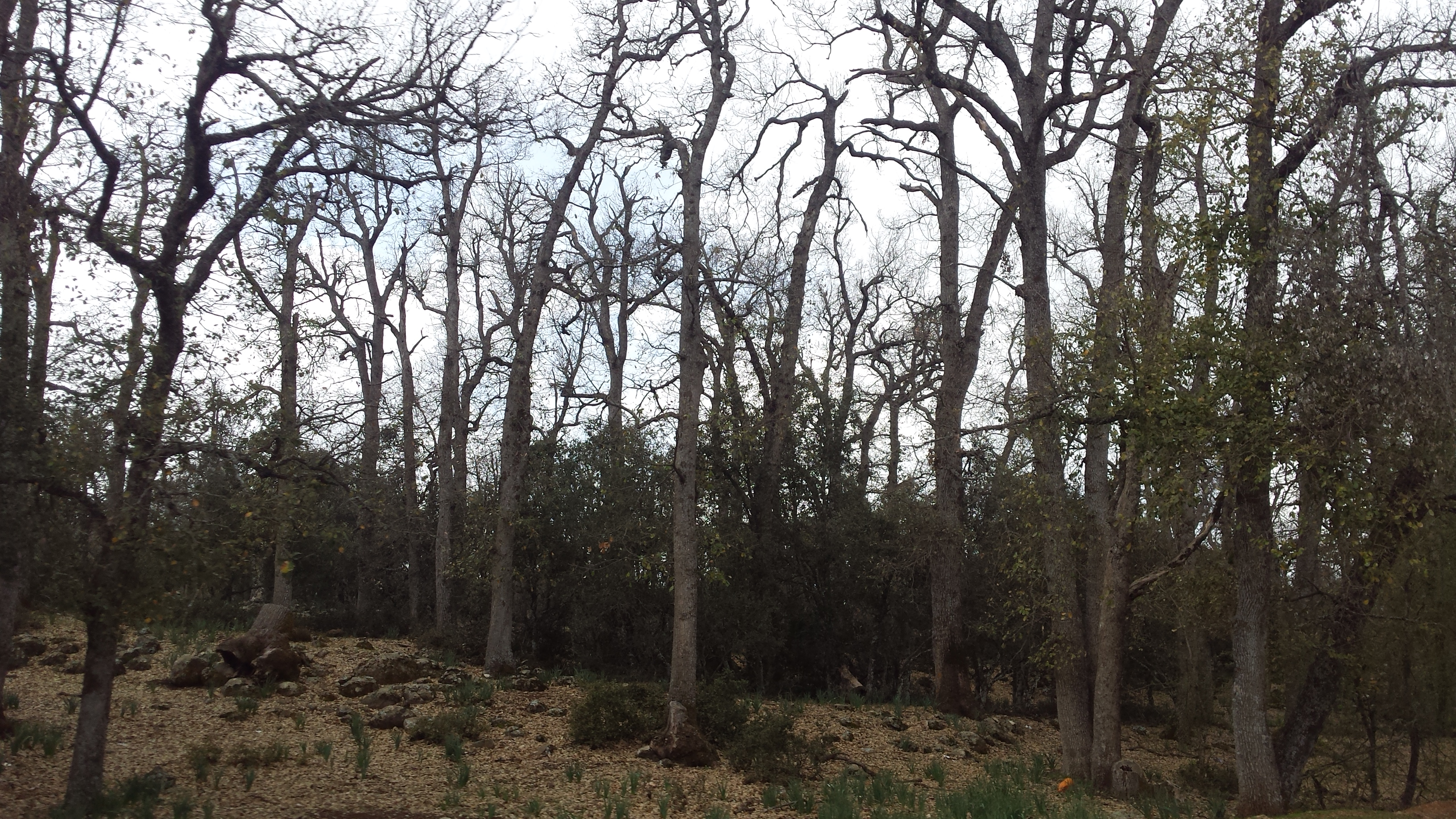
Quercus canariensis

The park contains a rich fauna. It constitutes a natural living environment for Barbary macaques. Moreover, in the park one can find Barbary wild boars, African wolves, striped hyenas, Barbary stags, Barbary sheep (arruis), red foxes, servals, caracals, European otters, European rabbits, crested porcupines, Cape hares, common genets and, possibly, Barbary leopards.

The park has been designated an Important Bird Area (IBA) by BirdLife International because it supports significant populations of Barbary partridges, ruddy shelducks, marbled teals, red-knobbed coots, Levaillant's woodpeckers, subalpine, Sardinian and speckled warblers, spotless starlings, Moussier's redstarts, and black-eared and black wheatears. Afennourir Lake is a Ramsar site with a shelter for birdwatching.

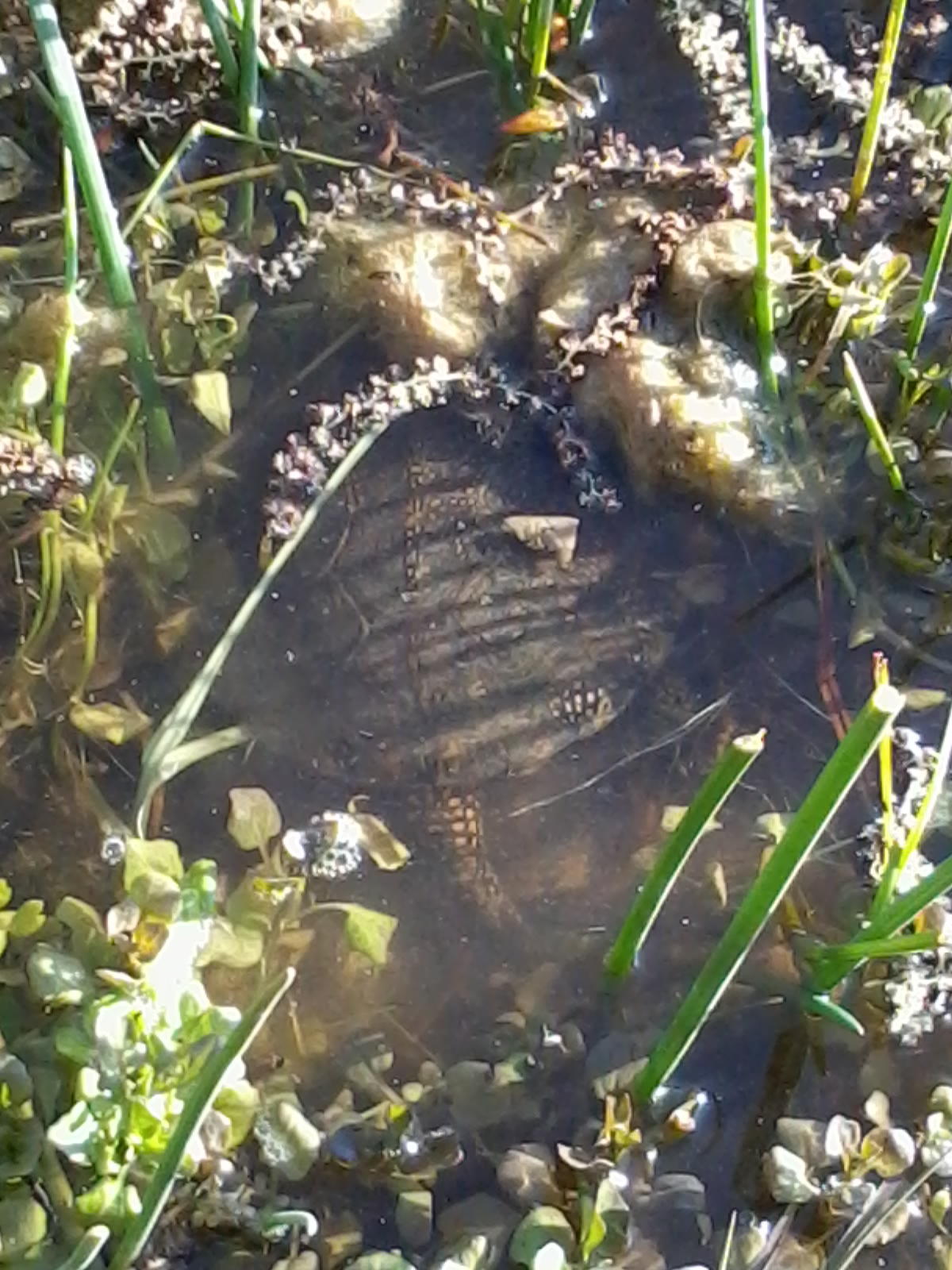
Spanish pond turtle (Mauremys leprosa)

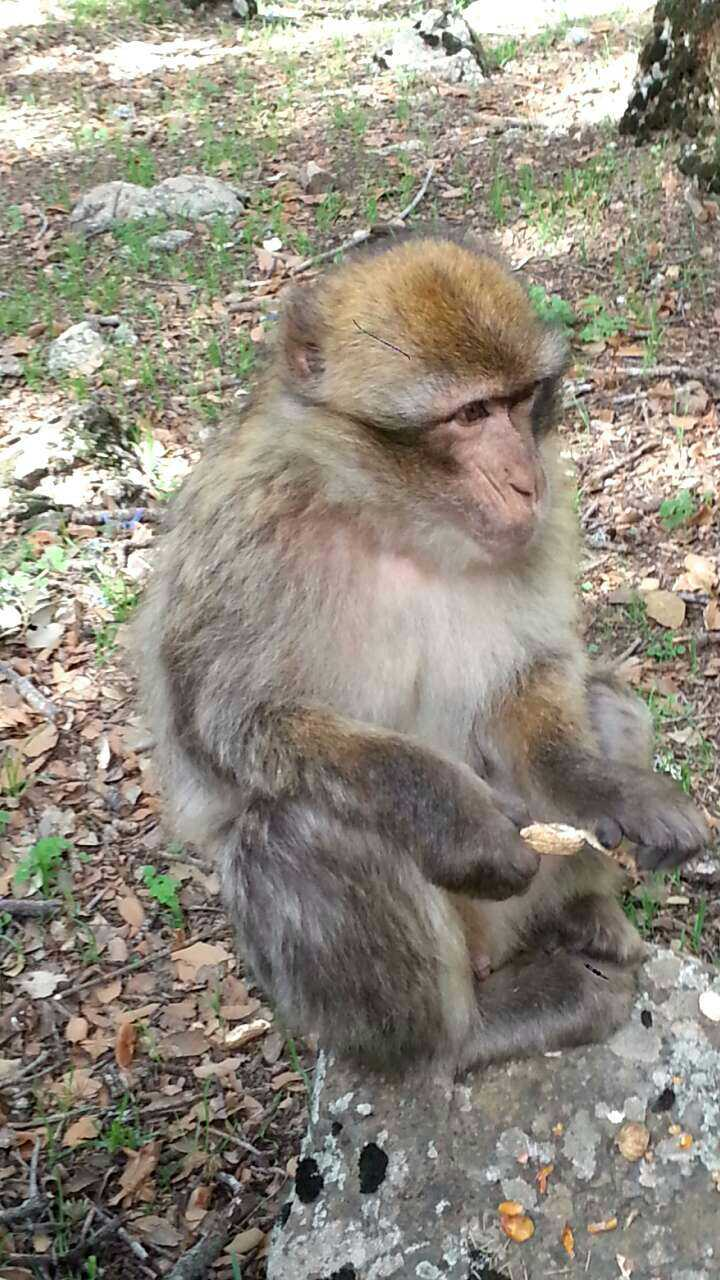
Barbary macaque (Macaca sylvanus)
