= Ian Wallace (ornithologist) =

British ornithologist (1933–2021)

D. Ian M. Wallace
- Born: Donald Ian Mackenzie Wallace; 14 December 1933; Norfolk, England
- Died: 4 November 2021 (aged 87)
- Other names: Ian Wallace; D.I.M. Wallace; DIMW
- Known for: Concise edition (BWPC) of The Birds of the Western Palearctic

Donald Ian Mackenzie Wallace (14 December 1933 – 4 November 2021), known as Ian Wallace, D.I.M. Wallace, or by his initials DIMW, was a British birder, author and artist.

== Early life ==
Wallace was born on 14 December 1933 in Norfolk, England, to Scottish parents. He was educated at Loretto School, near Edinburgh. Early in the 1950s, he undertook National Service with the King's African Rifles in Kenya.

== Career ==
Wallace was the second chairman of the British Birds Rarities Committee and was a contributing author to The Birds of the Western Palearctic.

In 1963, Wallace was among a party of birders, led by Guy Mountfort and including Julian Huxley, George Shannon and, James Ferguson-Lees, that made the first ornithological expedition to Azraq in Jordan. The expedition's recommendations eventually led to the creation of the Azraq Wetland Reserve and other protected areas. Papers from the expedition are in the United Kingdom's National Archives. He identified at least four species previously unknown in Nigeria.

He was the Honorary Life President of Flamborough Ornithological Group (since 2000), and of Flamborough Bird Observatory.

Wallace appeared as a guest on BBC Radio 4's Saving Species, discussing his October 1960 observations of the visible migration of birds over London, on their 50th anniversary.

He was described as "one of the very top ornithologists in the UK", "one of the great names of British bird-watching", by the BBC as "a pioneer of ornithology [in the United Kingdom]", and by Mark Cocker as both "one of the godfathers of modern birding" and "the grand old man of birds".

Wallace lived in Staffordshire. He died on 4 November 2021, at the age of 87. A five-page obituary was published in British Birds.

== Bibliography ==
- Discover Birds, Deutsch (1979), ISBN 0-233-97100-9
- Birdwatching In The Seventies, Macmillan (1981), ISBN 0-333-30026-2
- Watching birds (illustrated by Alan Harris, Ian Jackson), Usborne (1982), ISBN 0-86020-655-6
- Birds of Prey of Britain and Europe (paintings by Ian Willis), Oxford University Press (1983). ISBN 0-19-217729-X
- Beguiled by Birds, Christopher Helm (2004), ISBN 0-7136-6535-1 (publishers' page)

=== Contributions ===
- A Field Guide to the Birds of Britain and Europe by Roger Peterson, Guy Mountfort, P.A.D. Hollom. Collins, 1965
  - new edition of 1954 work; revised and enlarged in collaboration with I.J. Ferguson-Lees and Wallace
  - 1971 impression: ISBN 0-00-212020-8
  - 2004 edition: ISBN 978-0-00-719234-2

==== As illustrator ====
- Wood, J. Duncan (2003). Horace Alexander: 1889 to 1989: Birds and Binoculars. York: William Sessions Limited. ISBN 1-85072-289-7.

=== Significant articles ===
- Snipe and Grouse: English Bird Names in Birding World, Vol. 6 No. 4 pp. 164–5 ISSN 0969-6024
