= Alan Dean (ornithologist) =

British ornithologist

Alan R. Dean
- Born: United Kingdom
- Known for: Ornithology
- Website: deanar.org.uk

Alan R. Dean is a British ornithologist with a special interest in gulls and warblers. He lives in Solihull, West Midlands.

He is a member of the West Midland Bird Club and was an assistant editor of its Annual Reports for 1975–1980. He was a member of the British Birds Rarities Committee from 1984 to 1992 and in 2007 published a comprehensive account of the committee's history and publications. He has published a number of identification papers in British Birds. His papers and articles on Siberian chiffchaff have been of particular note. In 2010, the West Midland Bird Club conferred on him life membership, in recognition of his contribution to ornithology.

== Bibliography ==
=== Books ===
- The Birds of the West Midlands By Graham R. Harrison, Alan R. Dean, Alan J. Richards and David Smallshire, West Midland Bird Club ISBN 0-9507881-0-4 (1982)

=== Articles ===
- Glaucous and Iceland Gulls in the west Midlands. British Birds 69:179 (1976) ("WMBC: BB 69:179 - Glaucous and Iceland Gulls in the west Midlands". Archived from the original on 2008-07-25.)
- White-tailed Plover: new to Britain and Ireland. A. R. Dean, J. E. Fortey and E. G. Phillips. British Birds 70:465–471 (1977) ("WMBC: BB 70:465 - White-tailed Plover: New to Britain and Ireland, 1977". Archived from the original on 2008-05-16.)
- Field characters of Isabelline and Brown Shrikes. British Birds 75:395-406 (1982)
- British status and identification of Greenish Warbler. British Birds 78:437-451, (1985)
- Seasonality of Herring Gulls in the west Midlands. British Birds 80: 632, (1987) ("WMBC: BB 80:632 - Seasonality of Herring Gulls in the west Midlands". Archived from the original on 2008-07-25.)
- Wintering Glaucous, Iceland and Herring Gulls in the Midlands. Birdwatch (2002) ("WMBC: Birdwatch - Wintering Glaucous, Iceland and Herring Gulls in the Midlands". Archived from the original on 2008-05-16.)
- Siberian Chiffchaff revisited. A.R. Dean and Lars Svensson. British Birds 98:396-410 (2005)
- The British Birds Rarities Committee: a review of its history, publications and procedures. British Birds 100:149-176 (2007)
- Enigmatic grey-and-white Common Chiffchaffs. British Birds 100:497-499 (2007)
- Colour nomenclature and Siberian Chiffchaff. British Birds 101:146-149 (2008)
- The status in Britain of 'Siberian Chiffchaff'. Alan Dean, Colin Bradshaw, John Martin, Andy Stoddart and Grahame Walbridge. British Birds 103:320-338 (2010)
- How many Siberian Chiffchaffs are reaching Britain? British Birds 106: 282-283 (2013)
