= Colin Bradshaw =

English physician, ornithologist and photographer

Colin Bradshaw is an English physician, ornithologist, and musician who was chairman of the British Birds Rarities Committee from 1997 to 2008. He was active in the BBRC for almost 20 years, both as a committee member and as chairman. He is a medical doctor by profession and travels extensively for birding, and among his other hobbies are guitar, cricket, and photography.

== Life and career ==
As chairman of the BBRC he was responsible for running the organisation, and leading their adjudications of rare bird records in the United Kingdom.

Some testimonies about him given on or after on his retirement in 2008:

- "After 18 years involvement with the British Birds Rarities Committee, the last 11 as chairman, Colin Bradshaw will retire in 31 March 2008. His outstanding managerial skills and vision have steered the committee through times of great and often difficult change. These have included unprecedented developments in identification and taxonomy, the move to electronic submission and most recently the recruitment of a new secretary. He will now take a very well earned rest."
- "A lifelong birder, Colin was Chairman of the British Birds Rarities Committee for over a decade. Since retiring from that he has been able to expand the amount of photography he has done. He combines a busy medical career with his other interests of playing guitar, rugby & cricket, travel, cooking birding & photography. He doesn't have much time to sleep!"
- BirdWatch magazine
- "Many thanks to Colin Bradshaw for these two fine bird photos taken during a short trip to Islay a couple of weeks ago. Colin retired from the British Birds Rarities Committee in 2008 after a total of 19 years service, including 11 as chairman".

He continued to be involved the BBRC's activities after retiring.

== Bibliography ==
=== Books ===
- The Birds of Battlesteads - a photographic guide to the birds of the Battlesteads Hotel and the surrounding areas. These areas include the moors around Hadrian's Wall, the border forests and the Tyne Valley. 2011
- Birds of Brier Island - a photographic guide to the birds of Brier Island, Nova Scotia. 2011

=== Articles ===
- "Identifying ‘Siberian’ Chiffchaff Phylloscopus collybita tristis". November 2009. The Northumberland & Tyneside Bird Club
  - This article was referenced in a Carl Zeiss Award
- Several articles in British Birds on morphological similarity between cross-generic species-pairs e.g. eastern olivaceous and Blyth's reed warblers and paddyfield and booted warblers
  - (2000). "Separating Acrocephalus and Hippolais warblers". British Birds 93 (6): 277.
  - with Steele, Jimmy (1995). "Mystery photographs 195". British Birds 88 (11): 561–564.
  - with Steele, Jimmy (1997). "Mystery warblers in Tselinograd". British Birds 90 (4): 155–158.
- "Trying to Find a White-rumped Sandpiper - A Sad Tale from Cresswell". September 2011. Northumberland & Tyneside Bird Club
- "What does the British Birds Rarities Committee do?". 23 May 2004. British Birds Rarities Committee
- "A review of the 1950–57 British rarities". British Birds 99(9):460–64
- "Rare seabirds and a record of Herald Petrel". British Birds 95(4):156–65
- "The occurrence of Moustached Warbler in Britain". British Birds 93(1):29–38

== Committee activities ==
- 2000 Association of European Rarities Committees
- 2000 British Ornithologist's Union Records Committee - 27th Report (October 2000)
- 1995 Association of European Rarities Committees
- The British Ornithologists' Union Records Committee (BOURC), responsible for maintaining the official list of birds recorded in Britain
