= M. J. Rogers =

Michael J. Rogers or M. J. Rogers could refer to:

- Mike Rogers (Michigan politician), U.S. politician
- Mike Rogers (Maryland politician), Maryland state delegate
- Michael John Rogers, English ornithologist
- Michael Rogers (actor) (born 1964), Canadian actor
- A pseudonym of film director Ray Dennis Steckler
