= Rob Hume =

English ornithologist and author

- Occupation: Ornithologist

Robert 'Rob' Hume is an English ornithologist, author and journalist specialising in avian and natural history subjects. From Spring 1989 (vol. 12 no. 5), until Summer 2009 (vol. 22 no. 6), he was editor of the RSPB's Birds magazine, having previously edited the young people's version, Bird Life, at the RSPB's headquarters, The Lodge.

Hume did his early birdwatching at Chasewater, Staffordshire, and was a member of the West Midland Bird Club. He spent several years studying at Swansea University, during which time he birdwatched at Blackpill and on the Gower Peninsula.

He is a past member (and the fifth chairman) of the British Birds Rarities Committee; and a past member of the editorial board of British Birds magazine, but resigned both posts in 1997. His autobiography, Life With Birds, was published in September 2005.

His drawings of birds often appeared in West Midland Bird Club reports and a number of books and journals. He wrote and illustrated articles in the short-lived Midlands Birdwatcher quarterly magazine, five issues of which were published in late 1976 and 1977.

== Bibliography ==
- Britain's Birds: an identification guide to the birds of Britain and Ireland (Princeton up/WildGuides), 2016 (ISBN 978-0-691-15889-1)
- British Birds A Pocket Guide (Princeton UP/WildGuides), 2019 (ISBN 978-0691181677)
- RSPB What's That Bird? (RSPB/Dorling Kindersley), 2012 (ISBN 9781405393508)
- The Observer's Book of Birds (Penguin), 1987 (ISBN 978-0723216858)
- An Afternoon Out, 2019 (ISBN 978-1076830678)
- The Adventures of Riggle Tiggle Spider, 2019 (ISBN 978-1081284558)
- Father Christmas, the early years, 2019 (ISBN 978-1079649468)
- A Birdwatcher's Miscellany, Blandford Press, 1984 ISBN 0-7137-1385-2
- A Year of Bird Life, RSPB, 1985 ISBN 0-903138-19-0
- Birds of Britain, AA Publishing, 1988 ISBN 0-7513-1234-7
- Birds by Character – Britain & Europe: A Fieldguide to Jizz, Macmillan, 1990 ISBN 0-333-49053-3
- Owls of the World Dragon's World, 1991 ISBN 1-85585-352-3
- Focus on Birdwatching Heinemann, 1992 ISBN 0-600-57366-4
- Discovering Birds, A & C Black, 1993 ISBN 0-903138-53-0
- The Common Tern, Hamlyn, 1993 ISBN 0-540-01266-1
- Seabirds (Hamlyn Bird Behaviour Guides) Hamlyn, 1993 (with illustrations by Bruce Pearson) ISBN 0-600-57951-4
- Collins Gem Photoguide Birdwatching, Collins, 1995, ISBN 0-00-470756-7
- The Shell Easy Bird Guide, (illustrated by Peter Hayman) Macmillan 1997, ISBN 0-333-65420-X
  - 2002 edition ISBN 0-333-65420-X
- The EBCC Atlas of European Breeding Birds, T & A D Poyser, 1997 ISBN 0-85661-091-7 (contributor)
- Birds: An Artist's View, Courage Books, 1998, ISBN 978-0-7624-0376-9
- Macmillan Bird Guide, Macmillan, 1998 ISBN 0-333-76669-5
- RSPB Birds of Britain and Europe, Dorling Kindersley, 2002 ISBN 1-4053-0753-6
- RSPB Complete Birds of Britain and Europe, Dorling Kindersley, 2002, ISBN 0-7513-7354-0
  - RSPB Complete Birds of Britain and Europe (revised and updated), Dorling Kindersley, 2007, ISBN 978-1-4053-2228-7 (includes CD of birdsong)
- RSPB Birdwatching, Dorling Kindersley, 2003, ISBN 978-1-4053-1352-0
- English Birds and Green Places: Selected Writings: A Selection from the Writings of W.H. Hudson (Introduction), Weidenfeld & Nicolson, 2004, ISBN 0-575-07207-5
- Rob Hume, Guilhem Lesaffre and Marc Duquet, 2004, Oiseaux de France et d'Europe, Larousse ISBN 2-03-560311-0 (in French)
- Life With Birds (autobiography), David & Charles, 2005, ISBN 0-7153-2181-1
- Hume, Rob; Still, Rob; Swash, Andy; Harrop, Hugh (2021). Europe's birds: an identification guide. Princeton, New Jersey: Princeton University Press. ISBN 978-0691177656.
