= James Ferguson-Lees =

British ornithologist and author

Ian James Ferguson-Lees (8 January 1929 in Italy – 11 January 2017) was a British ornithologist. He became known as a member of the British Birds Rarities Committee who was responsible, with John Nelder and Max Nicholson, for publicly debunking the Hastings Rarities.

== Life and work ==
Ferguson-Lees spent his early years in Italy and France, but was educated in Bedford, England. He turned down the chance to study zoology at Oxford University in order to get married, and became a teacher for seven years. As a boy, he was taught about birds by Bernard Tucker.

He was also a twitcher, once driving through the night to see a dusky thrush at Hartlepool. In 1952 Max Nicholson persuaded him to become Assistant Editor of British Birds, then two years later, Executive Editor.

Ferguson-Lees was a member of the British Birds Rarities Committee from 1959 to 1963 and was responsible, with John Nelder and Nicholson, for debunking the Hastings Rarities - a series of rare birds, preserved by a taxidermist and provided with bogus histories.

He has made a particular study of peregrines and dunnocks.

He died on 11 January 2017.

He had two sons and two daughters.

== Bibliography ==
- Ferguson-Lees, James; Campbell, Bruce (1972). A Field Guide to Birds' Nests. Constable, London. ISBN 978-0094583504.
- Ferguson-Lees, James; Campbell, Bruce (editors, 1978-79). The Natural History of Britain and Northern Europe series. Hodder & Stoughton, London. "A complete survey of our natural history contained, for the first time, in five compact field guides", edited by Ferguson-Lees and Campbell, and authored by other naturalists:
  - Owen, Denis, Towns and Gardens (1978) ISBN 978-0-340-22614-8
  - Darlington, Arnold, Mountains and Moorlands (1978) ISBN 978-0-340-22615-5
  - Boatman, Derrick, Fields and Lowlands (1979) ISBN 978-0-340-23153-1
  - Barnes, Richard, Coasts and Estuaries (1979) ISBN 978-0-340-23154-8
  - Whitton, Brian, Rivers, Lakes and Marshes (1979) ISBN 978-0-340-23155-5
- Ferguson-Lees, James; Christie, David A. (2001). Raptors of the World. Illustrated by Kim Franklin, David Mead, and Philip Burton. Houghton Mifflin. ISBN 978-0-618-12762-7.

=== Contributions ===
- A Field Guide to the Birds of Britain and Europe by Roger Peterson, Guy Mountfort, P. A. D. Hollom (1954). Collins, London.
  - new edition of 1954 work; revised and enlarged in collaboration with Ferguson-Lees and D.I.M. Wallace (1956, 1958, 1965, 1974, 1993 etc.)
  - 1971 impression: ISBN 978-0-00-212020-3
  - 2004 edition: ISBN 978-0-00-719234-2

== Articles ==
- Nicholson, E.M.; & Ferguson-Lees, I.J. (1962). The Hastings Rarities. British Birds (August 1962) 55(8): 281.
