= Orphean =

Orphean may refer to:

- Relating to Orpheus, a legendary musician, poet, and prophet in ancient Greek religion and myth
- Orphean warbler, a typical warbler of the genus Sylvia

== See also ==
- Orpheus (disambiguation)
