= Sussex Ornithological Society =

The Sussex Ornithological Society (SOS) is a British registered charity dedicated to the study, recording, and conservation of wild birds and their habitats in the English historic county of Sussex. It was founded in 1962 and is one of the largest county bird clubs in Great Britain with a membership of 1988 as at the end of financial year in December 2014.

== History ==
The Sussex Ornithological Society was formed on 17 February 1962 at a meeting in the Royal Pavilion, Brighton attended by young ornithology enthusiasts. Amongst them were B A E (Tony) Marr, the Society's first secretary and later president; Richard Porter, later the author of Birds of the Middle East (Helm Field Guides, 2004); Chris Mead; Tony Sheldon; and Michael Shrubb, later the author of several books on ornithology including Birds, Scythes, and Combines: A History of Birds and Agricultural Change (Cambridge University Press, 2003). Shortly after its formation in 1962, the Society took over publication of the Sussex Bird Report, first published in 1948 and previously edited by Grahame des Forges and Denzil Dean Harber.

== Activities ==
The objectives of the SOS are:

- To record and study wild birds in Sussex
- To assist in the conservation of the wild birds of Great Britain
- To encourage by the use of meetings, books, outings and other ways:

(a) the study of birds in the field and ornithological science in general

(b) the education of its members and the general public in ornithological science and the need for the protection of wild birds and their habitats

The Society publishes the annual Sussex Bird Report from its database of approximately 200,000 sightings each year. In 2008 the SOS recorded the millionth bird in their database, a grey heron seen near Bognor Regis. The Society also published the 592 page book Birds of Sussex in 1996 which includes members' work carried out from 1988 to 1991 for the British Trust for Ornithology Atlas of Breeding Birds. The Society's other activities include:

- Contributing to national projects such as the Atlas 2007-2011 project to map the birds in Britain and Ireland.
- Advising on bird conservation issues
- Supporting projects which help preserve wild birds in Sussex ranging from the funding of bird boxes to land purchases such as the RSPB nature reserve at Bracklesham Bay.

"The Birds of Sussex", the Society's latest avifauna was published by the British Trust for Ornithology (BTO) in January 2014. The publication covers the state of each of the 397 species on the Sussex List. The book details what birds are found and where they are found. Plus the population trends, the threats and the outlook for each species.

== Membership ==
As the Society approached its 50th anniversary in 2012, it had 1695 members, membership at the financial year end of 2014 nearly 2000 making it one of the largest county bird clubs in Great Britain. Membership is by yearly subscription and includes a quarterly newsletter and a copy of the annual Sussex Bird Report. In addition to recording bird sightings and taking part in county and national bird surveys, members also participate in the Society's conservation working parties and educational field trips.

Notable past members

- Chris Mead
- Michael John Rogers
