= Peter Lansdown =

Welsh ornithologist

Peter Geoffrey Lansdown (born 28 March 1947) is a Welsh ornithologist.

He was the fourth chairman of the British Birds Rarities Committee, serving from 1986 to 1993. He has also served on the British Ornithologists' Union Records Committee.
