= Philip Hollom =

British ornithologist

Philip Arthur Dominic Hollom (9 June 1912 – 20 June 2014) was a British ornithologist.

== Life ==
He was born in Bickley, Kent, England, the second of five sons. His younger brother, Sir Jasper Hollom, was Deputy Governor of the Bank of England from 1970 to 1980, having been Chief Cashier of the Bank of England from 1962 to 1966.

In March 1951 he became a member of the editorial board of British Birds magazine under the senior editorship of Max Nicholson, whom he succeeded in 1960. Nicholson, who had remained on the editorial board, and Hollom stood down in 1972 and were replaced on the board by Ian Wallace and Malcolm Ogilvie.

Hollom was a Council member and Vice President of the Ornithological Society of the Middle East. He was the first chairman of the British Birds Rarities Committee and was awarded the British Trust for Ornithology's Tucker Medal in 1954 and the British Ornithologists' Union's Union Medal "for his outstanding contribution to the BOU and to ornithology" in 1984.

He lived in Hydestyle, Surrey, from the mid-1980s until his death. He turned 100 in June 2012 and died on 20 June 2014 at the age of 102. He had been a member of the BOU for 81 years. Hollom was survived by his daughter and two sons.

== Bibliography ==
- The Great Crested Grebe Enquiry 1931 by T. H. Harrisson and P. A. D. Hollom. H. F. & G. Witherby (1932)
- A field guide to the birds of Britain and Europe by Roger Peterson, Guy Mountfort, P.A.D. Hollom. Collins, 1954
  - 1965 edition: revised and enlarged in collaboration with I.J. Ferguson-Lees and D.I.M. Wallace
  - 1971 impression: ISBN 0-00-212020-8
  - 2004 edition: ISBN 978-0-00-719234-2
- The Popular Handbook of British birds. H. F. & G. Witherby (1952, revised 1955, 1962, 1968, 1988)
  - 5th (1988) edition: ISBN 0-85493-169-4
- Trapping Methods for Bird Ringers (BTO Guide No. 1) (1955)
- The Popular Handbook of Rarer British birds. H. F. & G. Witherby (1960) - included specially commissioned plates, by David Reid-Henry and Peter Scott
- Birds of the Middle East and North Africa. Poyser ISBN 0-85661-047-X (1988)

=== Dedicated to Hollom ===
- Birds of the Middle East R. F. Porter, S. Christensen, P. Schiermacker-Hansen
  - 1996 ISBN 978-0-85-6610769
  - 2004 ISBN 978-0-69-1121048

== Sources ==
- Hollom profile, Copac.ac.uk; accessed 31 July 2017.
