= Jasper Hollom =

Former Chief Cashier of the Bank of England (1917-2014)

Jasper Quintus Hollom
- Born: 1917
- Died: 2014 (aged 96–97)
- Occupation: Chief Cashier

Sir Jasper Quintus Hollom KBE (16 December 1917 – 29 August 2014) was Chief Cashier of the Bank of England 1962–66, Deputy Governor of the Bank of England 1970–80, and chair of the City Takeover Panel 1980–87.

Hollom was educated at King's School in Bruton, Somerset. He did not attend university and worked first in an insurance office before joining the Bank of England in 1936.

During the Second World War he served in the infantry in the Western Desert and was in an Italian prisoner of war camp from 1942.

Hollom was instrumental in navigating the British banking system through the secondary banking crisis of 1973–75. He was appointed KBE in the 1975 Birthday Honours.

In 1954 he married Patricia Ellis who died in 2013.

His elder brother was the distinguished ornithologist Philip Hollom.
