= Jimmy Steele (dentist) =

British dentist

James George Steele CBE (28 June 1962 – 16 November 2017) was a British dentist. He authored the Steele Review in 2009 which proposed reforms to the dental services provided by the National Health Service.

== Early life and education ==
Born in Fairmilehead, Edinburgh to George and Christelle Steele, Jimmy Steele attended Royal High School before studying dentistry at the University of Dundee. He had an older sister, Alison.

== Career ==
Upon graduation in 1985, Steele began his career at the Glasgow Dental Hospital and School and the Perth Royal Infirmary. In 1989, he joined the faculty of Newcastle University, teaching in the School of Dental Sciences. In 2006, the Tony Blair government modified the NHS dentistry system, so that dentists were paid a rate based on a selection of pre-approved treatments. Three years later, the Steele Review proposed that dentists working in the NHS system be paid for by the number of patients seen, as well as quality of service. The Steele Review further recommended that dentists focus on disease prevention, not solely treatment. Steele was named a Commander of the Order of the British Empire in the 2012 New Year Honours for his 2009 report. In 2016, the British Dental Association awarded the John Tomes Medal to Steele.

== Personal life and death ==
Steele married Katherine Bushby in 1987, with whom he had two children. He was diagnosed with glioblastoma in 2015, and died at the age of 55 on 16 November 2017, in Newcastle upon Tyne. He also was an amateur birdwatcher and sat on the British Birds Rarities Committee.
