= William Brunsdon Yapp =

English zoologist

- Born: 8 February 1909
- Died: 12 March 1990 (aged 80–81)
- Known for: Books
- Scientific career
- Fields: Zoology, Ornithology
- Institutions: University of Birmingham

William Brunsdon Yapp OBE (8 February 1909 – 12 March 1990) was an English zoologist and author who worked as a senior lecturer in zoology at the University of Birmingham. Among his major works was a study of the birds illustrated in medieval English works including the Bayeux Tapestry.

== Biography ==
Yapp, the only son of William Henry and Margaret Mary, was born in Bristol where his father had moved to from Hereford so as to provide education to his daughters. After studies at Bristol Grammar School, Yapp went to Downing College, Cambridge where he went by the nickname of Brunny to friends and Brunsdon generally. Graduating in the natural sciences, he went on to teach at Haileybury and then at Manchester Grammar School before joining Birmingham University. He published several well-known textbooks in zoology including An Introduction to Animal Physiology 1939, Vertebrates 1965 and had very strong views on how biology should be taught. He served on the National Parks Commission from 1953 to 1966 and was a UK Member to the Committee on Nature and Landscape Council of Europe in Strasbourg and attended the first world conference on national parks held in the USA in 1962. He pioneered a bird censusing technique based on walking the perimeter of an area to note the locations of singing birds in his book Birds and Woods (1962). He also served on the committee that helped establish long-distance walking paths in England. After his retirement, he served as a scientific expert for Shell Chemicals, defending the company during the 1987-88 trials over dieldrin and its toxicity to wildlife. He supported an informed debate on matters of nuclear energy. In 1957, he gave his address as Stourbridge; and from 1961, he lived at Church End House, Twyning, Tewkesbury. In the mid 1980s he returned to Cambridge.

He was, for a time, Chairman of the research committee of the West Midland Bird Club.

He was appointed an Officer of the Order of the British Empire (OBE) in the 1966 New Year Honours for Services to the National Parks Commission.

== Personal life ==
Yapp married Bridget Joan Spedding (their engagement was announced in April 1940) and she died in Pendyffryn Hall Sanatorium, Penmaenmawr, on 4 September 1945. They had one child, a daughter. He was buried at St John’s in Keswick and had a memorial service in Cambridge. His obituary was in National Parks Today Summer 1990.

== Bibliography ==
- Bourne, Geoffrey Howard; Yapp, William Brunsdon (1957). The Biology of Ageing ... Edited by W. B. Yapp and G. H. Bourne. London. pp. xiv. 128. 8º.
- Yapp, William Brunsdon; Watson, Donald John (1958). The Biological productivity of Britain. London: Institute of Biology. pp. xii, 126 p. illus., map. 23 cm.
- Yapp, W. B. (William Brunsdon) (1962). Birds and woods. London: Oxford University Press. p. 308.
- Yapp, W. B. (William Brunsdon) (1962). Leland's 'Firres'. pp. 407–409.
- Borradaile, Lancelot Alexander; William Brunsdon YAPP (1963). Borradaile's Manual of Elementary Zoology. Revised by W. B. Yapp ... Fourteenth edition. [With illustrations.] London: Oxford University Press. pp. x. 780. 8º.
  - Some preceding editions were also revised by Yapp
- Yapp, W. B. (William Brunsdon) (1965). Vertebrates their structure and life. New York: Oxford University Press. pp. vii, 525p, 8 col. plates : ill., 24cm.
- Yapp, W. B. (William Brunsdon) (1969). The weekend motorist in the Lake District. London: H.M.S.O. pp. iv, 31 p., 4 plates : illus., forms, maps, 25 cm. ISBN 0-11-700481-2.
- Yapp, W. B. (William Brunsdon) (1970). An introduction to animal physiology (3rd ed.). Oxford: Clarendon. pp. xvii, 349 p., 2 plates. : ill., 23 cm. ISBN 0-19-854111-2.
- Yapp, William Brunsdon (1981). Birds in medieval manuscripts. London: British Library. pp. 190p : ill.(some col.), 22x24 cm. ISBN 0-904654-54-0.
- Yapp, William Brunsdon (1987). Animals in medieval art The Bayeux tapestry as an example. Amsterdam. pp. 15–73 : ill, cm.

=== Notable papers ===
- Yapp, W. B. (1953). "The High-Level Woodlands of the English Lake District". Northwest Naturalist. 24: 190–207, 370–383.
- Yapp, W. B. (1953). "The bird community of the fell woods of the English Lake District". Northwest Naturalist. 24: 503–512.
- Yapp, W. B. (1955). "The succession of birds in developing Quercetum petraeae". Northwest Naturalist. 26: 58–67.
- Yapp, W. B. (1955). "A Classification of the Habitats of British Birds". Bird Study. 2 (3): 111–121. Bibcode:1955BirdS...2..111Y. doi:10.1080/00063655509475820.
- Yapp, W. B. (1955). "The birds of Welsh high level oakwoods". Nature in Wales. 1: 161–166.
- Yapp, W. B. (1956). "The Theory of Line Transects". Bird Study. 3 (2): 93–104. Bibcode:1956BirdS...3...93Y. doi:10.1080/00063655609475840.
- Yapp, W. B. (1956). "The Birds of High-Level Woodlands. The Breeding Community". Bird Study. 3 (3): 191–204. Bibcode:1956BirdS...3..191Y. doi:10.1080/00063655609475848.
- Yapp, W. B. (1959). "The Birds of High-Level Woodlands. The Winter Population". Bird Study. 6 (3): 136–140. Bibcode:1959BirdS...6..136Y. doi:10.1080/00063655909475945.
- Yapp, W.B. (1969). "The bird population of an oak woodland (Wyre Forest) over eighteen years". Proceedings of the Birmingham Natural History Society. 21: 199–216.
- Yapp, W.B. (1974). "Birds of the northwest Highland birchwoods". Scottish Birds. 8: 16–31.
- Yapp, William Brunsdon (1983). "The illustrations of birds in the Vatican manuscript of De arte venandi cum avibus of Frederick II". Annals of Science. 40 (6): 597–634. doi:10.1080/00033798300200401.
- Yapp, William Brunsdon (1985). "A New Look at English Bestiaries". Medium Ævum. 54 (1): 1–19. doi:10.2307/43628861. JSTOR 43628861.
