= Michael John Rogers =

English ornithologist

Michael ('Mike') John Rogers (5 October 1932 – 10 October 2006) was an English ornithologist and Honorary Secretary to the British Birds Rarities Committee.

Born in Sutton Coldfield (then in Warwickshire), England, the only child of the head brewer at Ansells Brewery, Birmingham, he attended King Edward's School, Birmingham. He joined the West Midland Bird Club as a Junior Member in 1946 and quickly established himself as one of the region's keenest birders. He spent his National Service in the Army Intelligence Corps. In 1958 he joined the Metropolitan Police. In 1981, he retired as a Detective Sergeant, from the force and a few years later moved firstly to the Isles of Scilly and then, in 1987, to Cornwall. He suffered a mild stroke in 1991.

In 1978 he became the Sussex Ornithological Society's bird recorder. For many years he wrote the Rare Birds in Great Britain reports that appear annually in British Birds. He also founded ACRE, the Association of County Recorders and Editors, in 1993 and then took on the responsibility of being its secretary.

He was briefly married in the 1950s. He had no known children. A smoker, he died of lung cancer.
