= Guy Mountfort =

English advertising executive (1905–2003)

- Born: 4 December 1905; London
- Died: 23 April 2003 (aged 97); Bournemouth
- Known for: A Field Guide to the Birds of Britain and Europe, 1954
- Scientific career
- Fields: Advertising executive, amateur ornithologist and conservationist

Guy Mountfort OBE (4 December 1905 – 23 April 2003) was an English advertising executive, amateur ornithologist and conservationist. He is known for writing the pioneering A Field Guide to the Birds of Britain and Europe, published in 1954.

== Biography ==
Born in London, Mountfort was the writer of the 1954 A Field Guide to the Birds of Britain and Europe, with illustrations by Roger Tory Peterson and distribution maps by Philip Hollom. The book was the first to provide a portable, accurate, illustrated guide to essentially all birds likely to be seen in Britain, and its design influenced all subsequent field guides.

In 1961, he created the World Wide Fund for Nature (back then the World Wildlife Fund) with Victor Stolan, Sir Julian Huxley, Sir Peter Scott and Max Nicholson. In 1956, he led an expedition to the Coto Donana with the resulting Book Portrait of a Wilderness illustrated by Eric Hosking. In 1963, he led a party of naturalists and including Huxley, George Shannon James Ferguson-Lees and D. Ian M. Wallace which made the first ornithological expedition to Azraq in Jordan. The expedition's recommendations eventually led to the creation of the Azraq Wetland Reserve and other protected areas. Papers from the expedition are in the United Kingdom's National Archives. He was appointed an OBE in 1970, for services to ornithology. In 1972, he led the campaign to save the Bengal tiger, persuading Indira Gandhi to create nine tiger reserves in India, with eight others in Nepal and Bangladesh.

== Bibliography ==
- The Hawfinch (1957) New Naturalist Monograph No.15. Collins: London.
- Portrait of a Wilderness: The story of the Coto Doñana Expeditions (1958) Hutchinson: London.
  - 2nd edition (1968) David & Charles: Newton Abbott. ISBN 0-7153-4284-3
- Portrait of a River: the wildlife of the Danube from the Black Sea to Budapest (1962) Hutchinson: London.
- Portrait of a Desert: the story of an expedition to Jordan (1965) Collins: London.
- The Vanishing Jungle: the story of the World Wildlife Fund Expeditions to Pakistan (1969) Collins: London.
- Tigers (1973) David & Charles: Newton Abbott. ISBN 0-7153-6283-6
- So Small a World (1974) Hutchinson: London. ISBN 0-09-120590-5
- Back from the Brink – Successes in wildlife conservation (1978) Hutchinson: London. ISBN 0-09-132710-5
- Saving the Tiger (1981) Michael Joseph: London. ISBN 0-7181-1991-6
- A field guide to the birds of Britain and Europe by Roger Peterson, Guy Mountfort, P.A.D. Hollom. Collins, 1954
  - 1965 edition: revised and enlarged in collaboration with I.J. Ferguson-Lees and D.I.M. Wallace
  - 1971 impression: ISBN 0-00-212020-8
  - 2004 edition: ISBN 978-0-00-719234-2
  - With a foreword by Sir Peter Scott
  - Dedicated: "For Anna, Paul, Oliver and Stephen, who one day will know why Grandpa thought the protection of wildlife so important for their future."
- Wild India – The Wildlife and Landscapes of India by Guy Mountfort, Hashim Tyabji and Gerald Cubitt, New Holland Publishers – 2007 – 3rd Edition: ISBN 978-1-84537-923-0
