= Peter Hayman (ornithologist) =

British ornithologist and illustrator (1930–2025)

Peter Hayman (17 February 1930 – 2025) was a British ornithologist and illustrator.

== Life and career ==
Hayman was born in Uxbridge, Middlesex, England on 17 February 1930. After his education in Taunton school he studied architecture. He worked as an architect for several years in London but in 1969 he became an artist. His main interest was water-colour paintings of British birds. In 1976 the British publisher Mitchell Beazley released the book "The Birdlife of Britain" which was written by Philip John Kennedy Burton and illustrated by Hayman. In the 1980s he illustrated some books which were published as Helm Identification Guides. In 1991 he published "The Complete Guide to the Birdlife of Britain & Europe". This richly illustrated book with 3,500 water colour paintings which was published in collaboration with Rob Hume was translated in several languages, and became a popular bird guide in Europe. Hume recognises this as one of his most pleasing books, being honoured to have been chosen by the artist as his collaborator on the text. He believes it has some of Hayman's most accurate yet also most beautiful work, which took bird identification illustrations to a new level. Hayman died in 2025.

== Bibliography ==
=== As author ===
- Shorebirds — an identification guide to the waders of the world (1986) by Hayman, John Marchant & Tony Prater — ISBN 0-7470-1403-5
- The Heron's Handbook (1987) by Hayman, James Hancock, James Kushlan & Robert Gillmor — ISBN 0-06-015331-8
- The Complete Guide to the Birdlife of Britain & Europe (1991), by Hayman & Rob Hume - ISBN 1-85732-795-0
  - Bird: The Ultimate Guide to the Birds of Britain & Europe (2007), by Hayman & Rob Hume; brief description at Natural History Book Service (nobs.com)
- Birds of Prey of Britain & Europe (2006), by Hayman & Rob Hume - ISBN 1-84533-184-2

=== As illustrator ===
- The Birdlife of Britain (1976), by Philip John Kennedy Burton — ISBN 0-85533-087-2
- The Doomsday Book of Animals (1981), by David Day - ISBN 0-85223-183-0
- Shakespeare's Birds (1994), by Peter Goodfellow - ISBN 1-85422-715-7
- The Shell Easy Bird Guide (1997), by Rob Hume - ISBN 0-333-65420-X
- Birds of India, Pakistan, Nepal, Bangladesh, Bhutan, Sri Lanka, and the Maldives (1999), by Richard Grimmett, Carol Inskipp, Tim Inskipp — ISBN 0-691-00687-3

=== As author and illustrator ===
- Birdwatcher's Pocket Guide (1979). Mitchell Beazley ISBN 0-85533-148-8
