= Dan Zetterström =

Swedish ornithologist and bird artist

Dan Zetterström (born 1 June 1954) is a Swedish ornithologist and bird artist. He is best known as a co-author of the Collins Bird Guide, with Killian Mullarney, Lars Svensson and Peter J. Grant. He has designed several series of Swedish stamps.

He has contributed to the following titles:

- Collins Bird Guide, with Killian Mullarney, Lars Svensson and Peter Grant
- Handbook of Bird Identification, Mark Beaman and Steve Madge
- Country Life Guides, Birds of Britain and Europe, Håkan Delin et al.
- Handbook of the Birds of Europe The Middle East and North Africa (Birds of the Western Palearctic), S. Cramp et al.
