= Killian Mullarney =

Killian Mullarney is an Irish ornithologist, bird artist and bird tour leader. He designed a series of Irish definitive stamps for An Post illustrating Irish birds issued between 1997 and 2004.

He was born in Dublin in 1958, and educated at home for a few years by his mother, Máire Mullarney. He showed an interest in birds from an early age, including bird art, and began to make a name for himself in the late 1970s. Due to his keen interest in bird identification, he served as a member of the Irish Rare Birds Committee from 1980 to 2008, and serves as an identification consultant to many birding journals, including Birding World and Alula. He also wrote an influential series of articles with Peter J. Grant for Birding World which were later produced independently as 'The 'New Approach to Identification'.

He was jointly responsible, with Dan Zetterström for illustrating the Collins Bird Guide, which was written by Lars Svensson and Peter J. Grant and has been described by Birding World as "undoubtedly the finest field guide that has ever been produced", and "the last great bird book of the 20th century".

He now lives in Ireland with his wife, Cornelia and children, Helena, Sophia and Anna. They also have 2 dogs.
