= Collins Bird Guide =

Field guide to the birds of the Western Palearctic

- Front cover of the first edition
- Author: Lars Svensson and Peter J. Grant
- Illustrator: Killian Mullarney and Dan Zetterström
- Language: English
- Publisher: HarperCollins
- Publication date: 1999
- Publication place: United Kingdom
- Media type: Print (hardback & paperback); apps
- ISBN: 0-00-219728-6 (hardback); ISBN 0-00-711332-3 (paperback)
- OCLC: 40754502

The Collins Bird Guide is a field guide to the birds of the Western Palaearctic.

Its authors are Lars Svensson, Killian Mullarney, Dan Zetterström and Peter J. Grant, and it is illustrated by Killian Mullarney and Dan Zetterström (with two plates of North American passerines contributed by Larry McQueen in the first edition). It has been described as "undoubtedly the finest field guide that has ever been produced", and "the last great bird book of the 20th century".

It was originally published in Swedish and Danish in 1999, and in English in hardback in the same year, and later in paperback. A large-format English edition has also been produced, as have German and Dutch editions. The first edition was translated to 14 European languages, including Spanish, Portuguese, French, Dutch and German. A second edition, revised and enlarged, was published in January 2010. A series of updates and corrections were made in 2015, with no change to the edition number. A third edition was published in 2022.

The cover of the first edition, in all formats, depicts a barn owl. On the second edition, this was replaced by an Arctic tern. The original Swedish version of the third edition features a bluethroat, while the English version shows a barn swallow.

Eleven pages of introductory material are followed by the book's main content, 366 pages of text and colour paintings. The text for each species gives brief status notes, followed by a section detailing identification, and concludes with a section on voice. Accompanying most species accounts is a small colour map showing breeding, wintering and migrant range.

The guide is also available as a paid-for app, for iPhone and Android devices. The app includes all of the text and images from the print edition, as well as audio recordings. Additional data can be bought separately; the first such package being a set of distribution maps for 271 species, from the British Trust for Ornithology's Bird Atlas 2007–11.

All versions cover the Western Palaearctic region, with Europe, the North Atlantic islands (including Iceland, the Canary Islands, and Madeira, but not Greenland, the Azores, or Cape Verde), North Africa north of 30°N latitude, and the Middle East (including the Caucasus, Jordan, and Syria, but not Iraq, Iran, or Saudi Arabia).

Most of the species covered in the main part of the guide are regular breeding, wintering or migrant species in its area of coverage, although some vagrants are also included. There are additional sections giving brief accounts of (a) vagrants and (b) introduced breeding species and species recorded only as escapes.
