= West Midland Bird Club =

Ornithological organisation in England

- Founded: 1 November 1929
- Founder: Horace Alexander
- Type: Registered charity
- Purpose: Ornithology
- Region served: Staffordshire, Warwickshire, Worcestershire & West Midlands, England
- Key people: Bill Oddie (President)
- Website: westmidlandbirdclub.org.uk
- Formerly called: Birmingham Bird Club

The West Midland Bird Club is the UK's largest regional ornithological society. It has been serving birdwatchers and ornithologists in the four English counties of Staffordshire, Warwickshire, Worcestershire and (since its separation from the aforesaid counties in 1974) the Metropolitan West Midlands, with lectures, field trips, research, a bulletin and an annual report, since 1929. It is a registered charity in England and Wales, number 213311.

There are branches in Kidderminster, Solihull, and Stafford.

It manages the Belvide Reservoir nature reserve in Staffordshire, the Harborne Reserve in Birmingham, and the Ladywalk Reserve in North Warwickshire, as well as running an access-permit scheme for Blithfield Reservoir and Gailey Reservoir in Staffordshire. The Club sponsors bird feeding stations at Cannock Chase (Staffordshire) and Draycote Water (Warwickshire).

Bill Oddie has been the Club's president since 1999.

== History ==
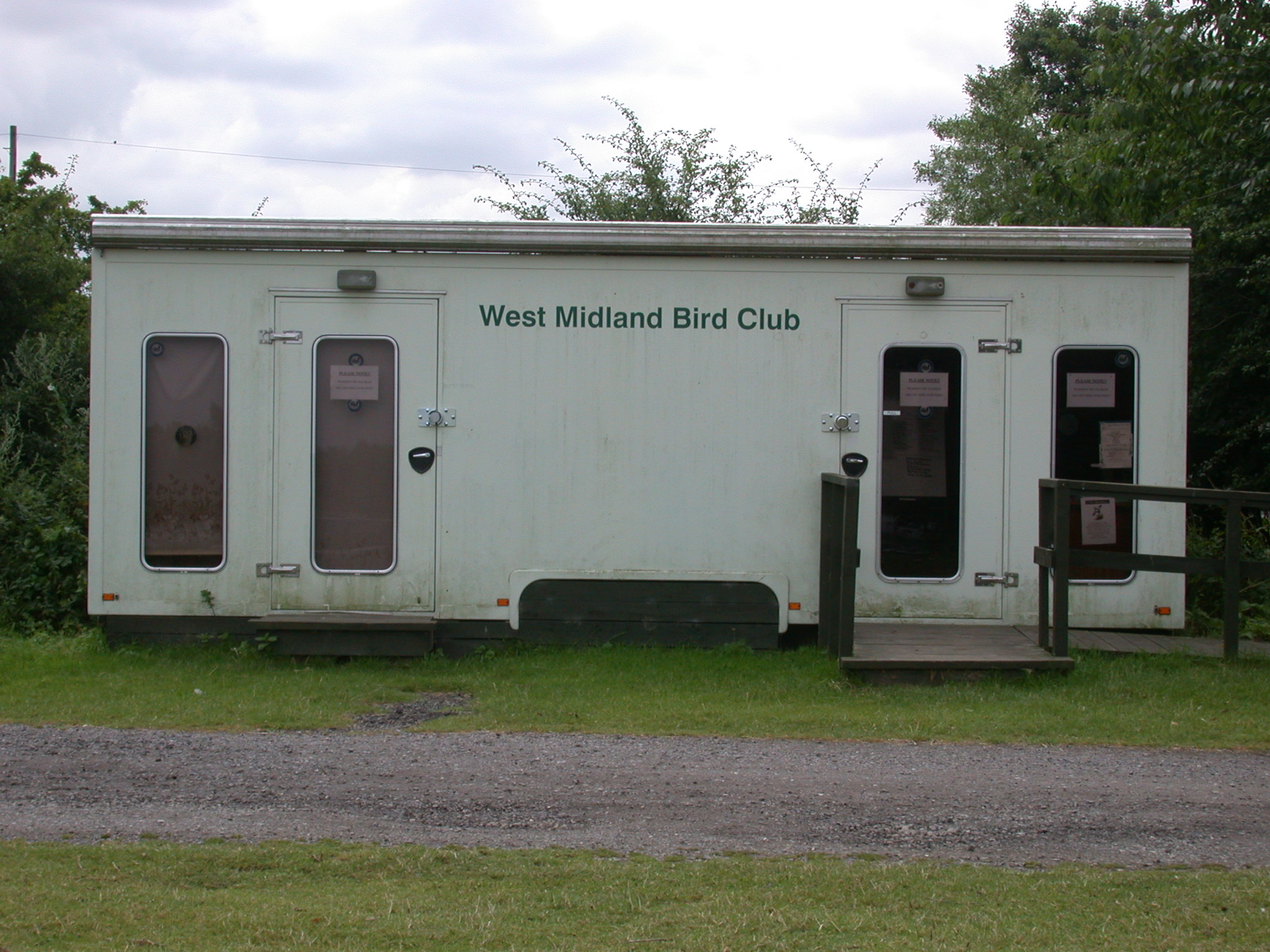
Kingsbury Water Park information centre, since demolished.

The Club was founded as the Birmingham Bird Club, by W. E. Groves and friends on 1 November 1929. The name changed to Birmingham and District Bird Club in 1945, to The Birmingham and West Midland Bird Club in 1947, and the current name was adopted in 1959.

It co-founded and still helps to manage the Bardsey Bird and Field Observatory and was instrumental in securing Brandon Marsh as a nature reserve.

A successful West Midland Bird Distribution Survey, published privately in 1951, led to the club publishing the world's first bird atlas, the Atlas of breeding birds of the West Midlands, in 1970.

Until 2010, the Club operated an information centre at Kingsbury Water Park (Warwickshire).

== President ==
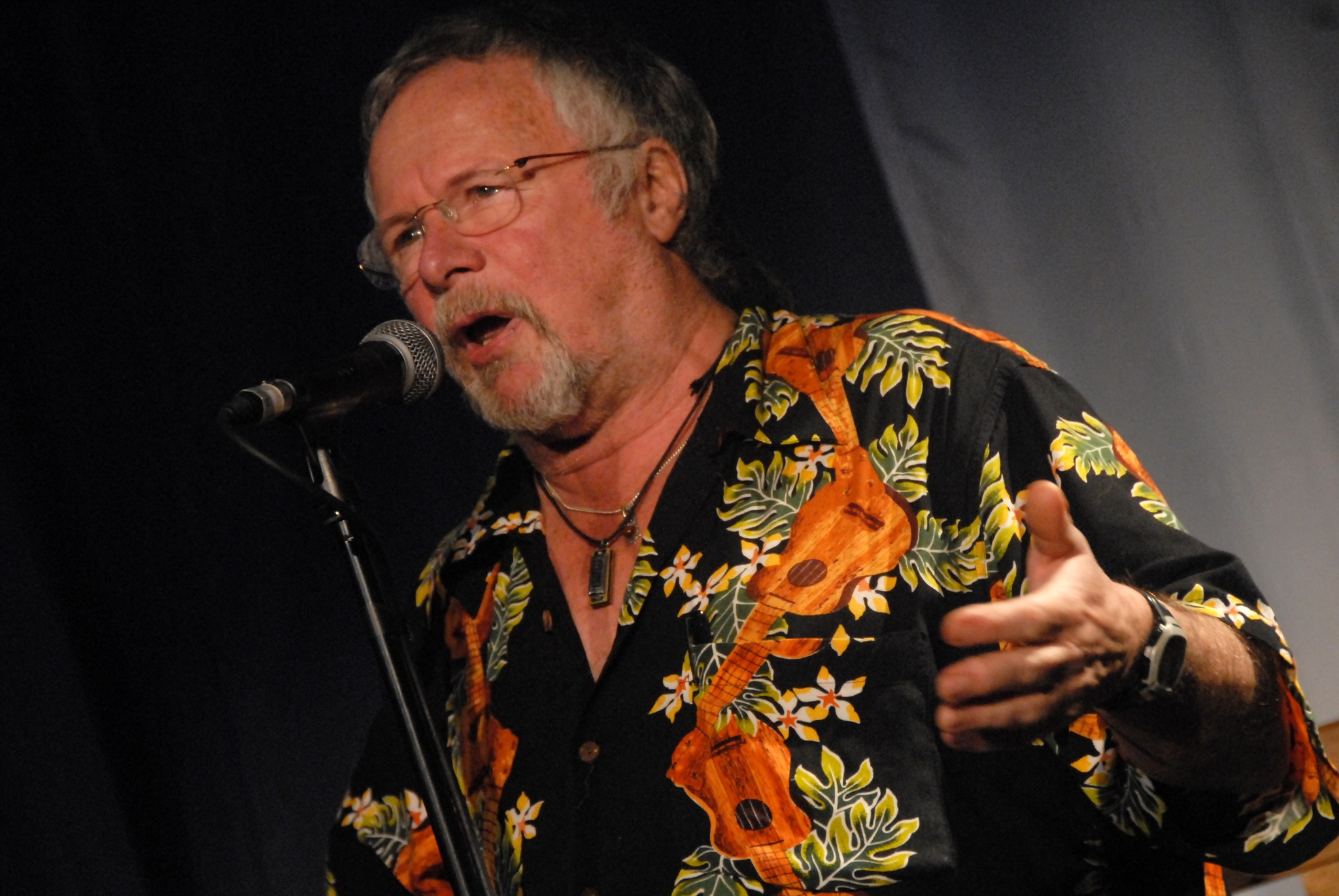
Club president Bill Oddie

Bill Oddie has been the Club's president since 1999. His first published article on birds appeared in the Club's 1962 Annual Report. He is first credited in the 1956 report, in which reports of his bird observations are tagged with his initials "WEO".

He discussed his membership of the Club in one of his first forays in the world of television natural history, as the subject of a Nature Watch Special: Bill Oddie - Bird Watcher, in which he was interviewed by Julian Pettifer, at Bartley Reservoir and the Christopher Cadbury Wetland Reserve.

== Notable members ==
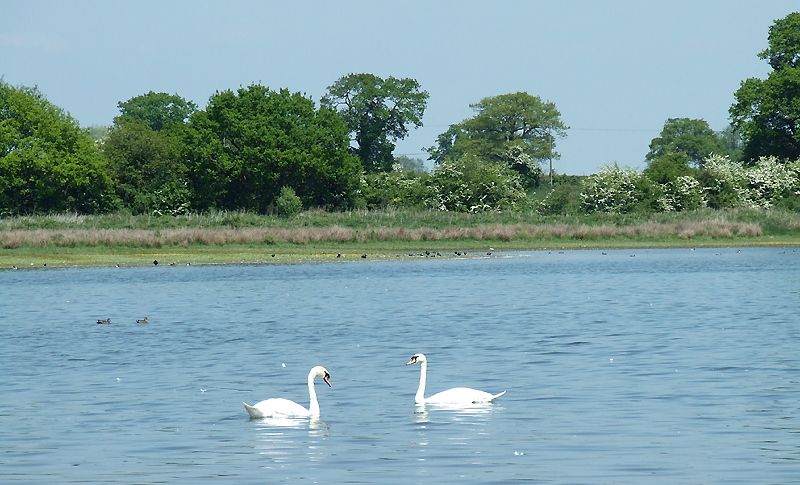
Belvide Reservoir, managed by West Midland Bird Club

Past and present

- Horace Alexander
- Alan Dean
- Rob Hume
- Cyril Hurcomb
- Tony Norris
- Bill Oddie
- Mike Rogers
- Eric Simms
- William Brunsdon Yapp

== Publications ==
- A regular Bulletin ISSN 1477-6111
- An Annual Report ISSN 1476-2862
- Lord, John; Munns, Dennis Johnstone; Beck, T. K; Richards, A. J (1970). Atlas of breeding birds of the West Midlands. London: Published for the West Midland Bird Club (by) Collins. pp. 3–276p(chiefly illus, form, maps), 20cm. ISBN 978-0-00-211040-2. Archived from the original on 26 July 2002.
- Harrison, Graham R.; Dean, Alan R.; Richards, Alan J.; Smallshire, David (1982). The Birds of the West Midlands. West Midland Bird Club. ISBN 978-0-9507881-0-4.
- Harrison, Graham; Harrison, Janet (2005). The New Birds of the West Midlands. West Midland Bird Club. ISBN 978-0-9507881-2-8. Archived from the original on 20 September 2011.
- A Checklist of the birds of Staffordshire, Warwickshire, Worcestershire and the West Midlands and Guide to Status and Record Submission (3 ed.). West Midland Bird Club. 2011. Archived from the original on 5 March 2012.
