= A Guide to the Birds of Mexico and Northern Central America =

- Author: Steve N. G. Howell
- Illustrator: Sophie Webb
- Language: English
- Published: 1995 (Oxford University Press)
- Publication place: United States
- Media type: Print (Paperback)
- ISBN: 0-19-854012-4
- OCLC: 28799888

A Guide to the Birds of Mexico and Northern Central America is a field guide to birds, covering 1070 species found in Mexico and five other countries in northern Central America (Guatemala, Belize, El Salvador, Honduras and Nicaragua). It is a 1995 book by Steve N. G. Howell and Sophie Webb, published by Oxford University Press.

A 60-page introduction outlines the geographical area covered, explains the areas geography and bird distribution within it, and discusses climate and habitat, and bird migration. Also included within this introduction are a section summarising the history of ornithology in the region, and essay on conservation, and a short summary of birding within the region. The introduction is followed by a 25-page section entitled "Using this book". This is then followed by the species accounts themselves, from pages 87 to 764.

A series of five appendices covers extinct species, species of hypothetical occurrence, birds of Pacific islands, of Gulf and Caribbean islands, and those found in eastern Honduras. These are followed by a 26-page bibliography, and indexes to English and scientific names.

The covers are illustrated with paintings of Mexican birds: a black-throated magpie-jay on the front cover, a short-crested coquette on the spine, and an unspotted saw-whet owl and two plumbeous kites on the rear cover.

71 colour plates are placed centrally within the book, between pages 400 and 401.

== Bibliography ==
- Howell, Steve N. G. and Sophie Webb (1995) A guide to the birds of Mexico and northern Central America ISBN 0-19-854012-4
