= Subalpine warbler =

Subalpine warbler has been split into two species:

- Western subalpine warbler, Curruca iberiae
- Eastern subalpine warbler, Curruca cantillans
