= Birdwatch (magazine) =

British monthly magazine for birdwatchers

- Cover of June 2011 edition, featuring a red grouse
- Editor: David Campbell
- Former editors: Josh Jones, Rebecca Armstrong, Dominic Mitchell
- Frequency: Monthly
- First issue: 1992
- Country: United Kingdom
- Website: www.birdguides.com/birdwatch
- ISSN: 0967-1870

Birdwatch (ISSN 0967-1870) is a British monthly magazine for birdwatchers, established in 1992 by Solo Publishing. It is distributed by subscription, through newsagents and electronically.

Key content areas include bird identification, site guides, skills development, recent sightings and news and reviews.

The circulation is around 13,000.

Solo Publishing was acquired by Warners Group Publications plc in 2008.
