= Richard Millington =

British ornithologist

Richard Millington is a British birder and bird artist. He lives in Cley-next-the-Sea, Norfolk with his wife Hazel.

He is assistant editor of Birding World magazine. His contributions to that journal include many articles on bird identification. He also runs Birdline, a telephone information service containing news of rare birds.

Richard Millington is also a twitcher. He is one of a small number of birders who have seen over 500 species in Britain. He also found the UK's first Rock Sparrow at Cley on 14 June 1981, still the only record in the UK. In 1980 he undertook a yearlist, at a time when this form of twitching was still in its infancy, seeing 300 species of bird in the wild in Britain throughout the course of the year, and his illustrated book A Twitcher's Diary catalogues his birding travels during that year.
