= Black-eared wheatear =

Black-eared wheatear has been split into the following 2 species:

- Western black-eared wheatear, Oenanthe hispanica
- Eastern black-eared wheatear, Oenanthe melanoleuca
