= Orphean warbler =

Orphean warbler is the name of:

- Eastern Orphean warbler Curruca crassirostris
- Western Orphean warbler Curruca hortensis
