= Lars Svensson (ornithologist) =

Swedish ornithologist (born 1941)

Lars Gunnar Georg Svensson (born 30 March 1941) is a Swedish ornithologist, who received an honorary degree from the Uppsala University in 2004. He specialises in the identification of passerine birds. In 2008 he published a paper on the poorly known large-billed reed-warbler (Acrocephalus orinus) which "dramatically changed ornithological perception of the Large-billed Reed Warbler".

== Selected publications ==
- Collins Bird Guide, with Peter J. Grant, Killian Mullarney and Dan Zetterström
- Identification Guide to European Passerines
