= Birding World =

British magazine (1987–2014)

- March 2011 cover
- Editor: Steve Gantlett
- Categories: Birdwatching
- Frequency: Monthly
- Publisher: Bird Information Service
- Founded: 1987
- Final issue: January 2014
- Country: United Kingdom
- Based in: Cley next the Sea, Norfolk
- Language: English
- Website: www.birdingworld.co.uk
- ISSN: 0969-6024

Birding World was a monthly birding magazine published in the United Kingdom. It was the magazine of the Bird Information Service, based at Cley next the Sea, Norfolk. With the publication of issue No. 26/12 in January 2014, Birding World magazine ceased publication.

== History and profile ==
Originally published in 1987 as Twitching volume 1, the magazine underwent a name-change to this name, in 1988 (also resetting its volume count back to 1). The editor was Steve Gantlett, and the assistant editor Richard Millington.

It was aimed at birders with an interest in the occurrence and identification of rare birds in the United Kingdom and the Western Palearctic. It also covered birding-related material from around the globe.

The range of material published included:

- papers on bird identification, often including proposed new identification characters for difficult groups of taxa
- news articles on rare birds in Britain and elsewhere in the Western Palearctic

Significant articles published included:

- A three-part series by Krister Mild on the identification of Western Palearctic black-and-white flycatchers
- A number of papers on the Feas's/Zino's petrel group
- An identification paper on booted, Sykes', western olivaceous and eastern olivaceous warblers

In 2004, its circulation was estimated at 4000 copies.

== See also ==
- List of journals and magazines relating to birding and ornithology
