= Peter J. Grant =

British ornithologist

Peter James Grant (1943 – 16 April 1990) was a British ornithologist. He was the third chairman of the British Birds Rarities Committee, from 1976 to 1986.

== Publications ==
- "The New Approach to Identification" (co-authored by Killian Mullarney)
- Gulls: a Guide to Identification
- "Collins Bird Guide" (co-authored by Lars Svensson, published posthumously)

== See also ==
- Peter and Rosemary Grant
