= British Birds (magazine) =

Monthly ornithology magazine

- Editor: Sarah Harris
- Categories: Ornithology
- Frequency: Monthly
- Publisher: BB 2000 Ltd.
- Founded: 1907
- Country: United Kingdom
- Language: English
- Website: britishbirds.co.uk
- ISSN: 0007-0335

British Birds is a monthly ornithology magazine that was established in 1907. It is now published by BB 2000 Ltd, which is wholly owned by The British Birds Charitable Trust (registered charity number 1089422), established for the benefit of British ornithology. Its circulation in 2000 was 5,250 copies; its circulation peaked at 11,000 in the late 1980s.

British Birds is aimed at serious birdwatchers and ornithologists, rather than the more casual birdwatchers catered for by some other magazines on the subject. It publishes the findings of the British Birds Rarities Committee.

Its mascot, and later logo, the red grouse, was chosen because at the time it was then considered an endemic British species; though subsequently long considered a subspecies of the willow grouse, further study resulted in it being returned to separate species status in 2024.

In 1916, British Birds magazine absorbed The Zoologist, due to the latter's shortage of subscribers.

== Editors ==
The current editor of British Birds, from September 2025 onwards, is Sarah Harris.

Former editors:

- starting with volume 1 (1907): H.F. Witherby, assisted by W.P. Pycraft (until vol. 3)
- from volume 3 (1909), Witherby was further assisted by the Rev. F.C.R. Jourdain and Norman F. Ticehurst
- in volume 12 (1918), for one year, Jourdain was the editor, assisted by Ticehurst
- from volume 13 (1919) Witherby was back as the editor; this situation continued until volume 33 (1939), when Jourdain died.
- from volume 34 (1940) Bernard W. Tucker became assistant-editor
- until 1999, Tim Sharrock was editor
- from 2000 to 2021, Roger Riddington was editor
- from 2021 to September 2025, Stephen Menzie was editor

== Numbering ==
Before 1946, all volumes ran from June to May. Harry Witherby produced Vol.1 No.1 in June 1907 and produced 12 monthly issues per volume. It was finally decided to change with Volume 38, which ran from June 1944 to December 1945. Wartime paper restrictions meant that those issues were all pretty thin so it was possible to bind 19 into one volume.

== The digital era ==
In 2007 a DVD-ROM disk containing the first 100 years' worth of content (volumes 1–100) was released in conjunction with BirdGuides Ltd. Subsequent volumes are available as paid-for updates.

In 2010, the magazine launched a blog, Facebook group and a Twitter account.

From October 2011, the magazine's first 100 years' of back issues are available on-line, free. More recent issues are available to subscribers to the print edition.

== See also ==
- List of ornithology journals
