= SureHarvest =

- Company type: For-Profit
- Industry: Sustainable Agriculture
- Founded: 1999
- Founder: Jeff Dlott, PhD
- Headquarters: Soquel, California
- Products: Farm Management Software, Professional Consultation, Product Certification
- Website: www.sureharvest.com

SureHarvest is an American agricultural firm providing professional consulting, information technology support and certification to farming enterprises. The company was founded in 1999 by entomologist Jeff Dlott, PhD, with the purpose of providing farmers with the knowledge and resources necessary to grow their crops in a manner deemed sustainable. Client farmers receive a software system that allows them to monitor and analyze resource use and communicate their farming practices to stakeholders; professional guidance by SureHarvest consultants and sustainability certification under the Protected Harvest non-profit program.

The company has been particularly influential in the implementation of the Stewardship Index for Specialty Crops, which seeks to establish universal measurement standards for what constitutes a sustainably grown crop, and the Lodi Rules, which seek to promote sustainable practices in the winegrowing industry and were partly developed by Dr. Dlott; products grown under Lodi Rules are certified by the Protected Harvest non-profit organization, managed by SureHarvest. These sustainability programs, along with the work of SureHarvest, seek to provide resources to increase sustainable practices in addition to limiting harmful practices. The certification process offered by Protected Harvest requires the water, air and soil of farms to undergo scientific scrutiny.

== See also ==
- Sustainable Agriculture
