= Edward Max Nicholson =

British environmentalist and ornithologist

Max Nicholson
- Born: Edward Max Nicholson; 12 July 1904; Kilternan, Ireland
- Died: 26 April 2003 (aged 98)
- Education: Hertford College, Oxford
- Occupations: Environmentalist, Ornithologist, government employee
- Known for: Founder of the World Wildlife Fund

Edward Max Nicholson (12 July 1904 – 26 April 2003) was a pioneering environmentalist, ornithologist and internationalist, and a founder of the World Wildlife Fund.

== Early life ==
Max Nicholson, as he was known to all, was born in Kilternan, Ireland, to English parents. His family moved to England in 1910, settling in Staines. He became interested in natural history after a visit to the natural history museum and later took to birdwatching, beginning to maintain a list of birds seen from 1913.

He was educated at Sedbergh School in Yorkshire and then Hertford College, Oxford from 1926, winning scholarships to both. At Oxford, he read history and visited Greenland and British Guiana as a founder member of the Oxford University Exploration Club. At Oxford, he organized bird counts and censuses on the University's farm at Sanford. In 1928, Nicholson created and managed the first national birdwatch survey, a survey of the grey heron.

== Ornithology and conservation ==
Nicholson already had published his first work in 1926, Birds in England, and had three similar books published soon after. In The Art of Bird-Watching (1931), he discussed the potential of co-operative birdwatching to inform the conservation debate. This led, in 1932, to the foundation of the British Trust for Ornithology, of which he was the first secretary and later chairman (1947–1949). In 1947–1948, with the then director general of the United Nations' scientific and education organisation UNESCO, Julian Huxley, he was involved in forming the International Union for the Protection of Nature (IUPN) (now International Union for Conservation of Nature (IUCN)).

In 1949, he oversaw Part 3 of The National Parks and Access to the Countryside Act 1949 which established the Nature Conservancy, a British state research council for natural sciences and 'biological service', and allowed for the legal protection of national nature reserves and Sites of Special Scientific Interest (SSSI). He replaced Captain Cyril Diver as Director General of the Nature Conservancy in 1952, serving until 1966, just after the Conservancy lost its independent status. During his leadership, the Conservancy established itself as a research and management body that promoted ecology as having broad relevance and application to land use decision-making and management. Monks Wood Experimental Station, which helped set up, was perhaps the first to examine the effect of toxic chemicals on wildlife.

In 1952, while in Baluchistan, he contracted polio, which left him with a limp. In 1961, Nicholson, together with Julian Huxley, Victor Stolan, Sir Peter Scott and Guy Mountfort, formed the organising group that created the World Wildlife Fund (WWF) (now the World Wide Fund for Nature). He was also a founder of the International Institute for Environment and Development. In 1966, he set up and headed environmental firm Land Use Consultants (LUC), remaining with them until 1989. One of LUC's first reports was 'Parkways in principle and Practice' (1967), in which Nicholson urged that "the problems of recreation, traffic, environmental quality and conservation should be studied together . .", to form a category of parkways in Britain.

From 1951 to 1960, he was the senior editor of "British Birds" and was the chief editor of The Birds of the Western Palearctic ("BWP", 1977–1994, OUP) from 1965 to 1992. He was the only author to stay with the project from start to end, personally writing the habitat sections of all species in the nine volumes. In 1971, he gave the Witherby Memorial Lecture on the subject of Geograms.

In 1976, he was an instrumental part of the setting up of Britain's first urban ecology park and the Trust for Urban Ecology. In 1978, Nicholson was instrumental in founding the ENDS Report which became a highly influential journal for environmental policy specialists. He was President of the Royal Society for the Protection of Birds from 1980 to 1985, helped set up the New Renaissance Group and was a trustee of Earthwatch Europe. In 1995, he appeared as a guest on Desert Island Discs.

He was awarded the Busk Medal by the Royal Geographical Society in 1990.

== Other activities ==
Nicholson's 1931 essay A National Plan for Britain led to the formation of the influential policy think tank Political and Economic Planning (PEP), now the Policy Studies Institute. Nicholson had strong ideas on how a country should be run and wrote a book "The System".

Nicholson joined the civil service in 1940, during World War II working for the Ministry of Shipping, then the Ministry of War Transport, attending conferences at Quebec and Cairo, and was with Winston Churchill at the post-war peace conferences at Yalta and Potsdam. From 1945 until 1952, he was private secretary to Herbert Morrison, the Deputy Prime Minister. He also chaired the committee for 1951's Festival of Britain. During the war years, he was in charge of organizing shipping operations and convoys across the Atlantic. He was involved in the planning of "Operation Overlord", the invasion of Europe. For his services he was awarded the CVO and CB.

== Personal life ==
Nicholson married Mary Crawford in 1932 and they had two children, Piers and Tom. The marriage was dissolved in 1964 and Crawford died in 1995. Nicholson then married Marie Mauerhofer (known as Toni) in 1965; they had one child, a son, David. She died in 2002. Max Nicholson died in 2003, aged 98.

== Legacy ==
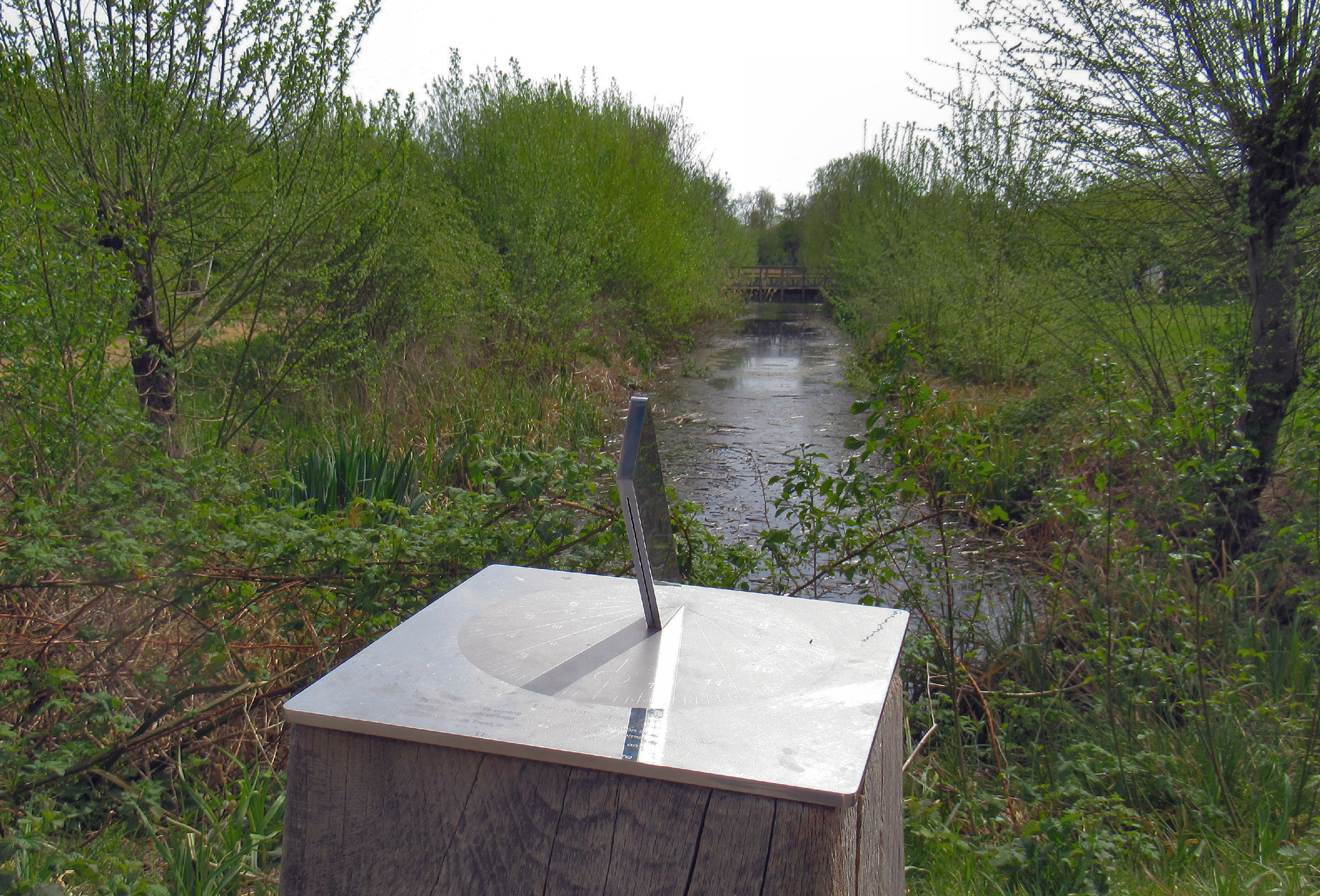
Sundial, London Wetland Centre

Every year on Nicholson's birthday, 12 July, a group of people walk a section of the Jubilee Walkway in London to celebrate his work in establishing the route. Two memorial sundials have been put in place in memory of Nicholson - one by the Wildfowl & Wetlands Trust at the WWT London Wetland Centre in Barnes, London, and another at Sedbergh School in Cumbria, where Nicholson went to school.

== Selected publications ==
- Birds in England (1926)
- How Birds Live (1927)
- The Art of Bird-Watching (1931)
- Songs of Wild Birds (1936 sound book with Ludwig Koch)
- The Humanist Frame (1961) (contribution)
- The System: The Misgovernment of Modern Britain (1967)
- The Environmental Revolution : A Guide for the New Masters of the World (1970)
