= Healthy Grown =

Healthy Grown Potato is an eco-brand that provides high-quality, sustainably grown, packaged, and shipped potatoes to consumers by leveraging integrated pest management (IPM) farming practices on large scale farms. A certification process is mandatory to market products as Healthy Grown. Through this program, growers implement on-farm conservation to improve biodiversity and restore native ecosystems on unfarmed parcels of land. All implemented practices are research-based by the University of Wisconsin-Madison and are found to be economically viable and ecologically sound and are supported by various non-governmental organizations. This whole-farm approach takes into consideration practices that consider water quality and soil erosion and has led to a reduced use of nutrients and pesticides. The goals of the Healthy Grown program as set forth in the approved Memorandum of Understanding include:

- Promotion of IPM practices
- Reduced utilization of risky pesticides
- Improvement of ecosystem biodiversity
- Articulated measurement systems of IPM
- Increased marketplace incentives

Healthy Grown was branded in 2001 by the Wisconsin Potato & Vegetable Growers Association (WPVGA) after collaborations lead to the development of an eco-label for biointensive IPM (bioIPM) grown potatoes set in 2000. The eco-standard for potatoes is divided into three parts: 1) a bioIPM section, 2) a toxicity score, and 3) a natural community standard. In 2001, over 4000 acres became certified for the program, and about 5000 acres meet the certification standard and are labeled as Healthy Grown.

== Collaborators ==
The Healthy Grown Program began as the Wisconsin Eco-Potato collaboration in 1996 that included a group of Wisconsin potato growers, the WPVGA, the World Wildlife Fund (WWF). In 2004, The WPVGA and Defenders of Wildlife signed the Memorandum of Understanding (MOU) listed above.

== Parameters for certification ==
A third party organization, Protected Harvest, audits and certifies all Healthy Grown growers, packers, and shippers each year for sustainable agriculture standards. The audit examines documentation of pesticide records, conservation efforts, and location of growth and distribution of product. Standards include the use of an IPM strategy and use of alternative pesticides than those found the list that include chemicals with high toxicity scores and typically include organophosphate, carbamate, and other product families that have human health risk and endocrine disruption in wildlife. Resistance management strategies include a limited list of allowable pesticides, which reduces the likelihood of resistance development. In addition, accumulated toxicity levels are monitored for long and short season crops. IPM management recommendations for the production system are provided by the University of Wisconsin Research and Extension. The certification program expanded in 2006 to include a Natural Community Standard which constitute science-based approaches that help implement restoration for native wetland, oak savanna, and native prairie communities on privately owned non-agricultural lands on grower farms. Such habitats promote species such as the Karner Blue Butterfly, Sandhill cranes, prairie chickens, and other species that are at risk. Land on Healthy Grown farms are evaluated in the context of the regional ecosystem and are chosen based on the following parameters:

- The site fits within the local and regional conservation objectives
- The site contains remnants of native plant communities or is suitable for restoration of native plant communities
- The landowner has no plans for development or other use of the site
- Restoration on the site will be economically sustainable

== Recognition ==
- USDA Secretary’s Honor Awards for Maintaining and Enhancing the Nation’s Natural Resources and Environment
- World Wildlife Fund Gift to the Earth Award
- International IPM Award of Achievement
- International Crane Foundation Good Egg Award for Excellence

== Expansion of Program ==
In 2010, the Healthy Grown initiative was expanded into other crops. This model considers sustainability on multi-crop farms and provides modules for each specific crop grown. In 2011, crop modules for fresh potatoes, processed green beans, and carrots entered pilot testing. In 2012, modules for sweet corn, peas, soybeans, and field corn will be tested. The model regional approach is also being expanded to a national framework.
