= Lodi Rules =

"Lodi Rules" is the short name for the Lodi Winegrape Commission's "Lodi Rules for Sustainable Winegrowing", a set of guidelines used by winegrowers throughout the Lodi winegrowing region of California to ensure that their products are grown in a sustainable manner. The rules are intended to lead to quantifiable improvements in the health of the adjacent ecosystem as well as the wine quality. Products grown in accordance with the rules are certified by the non-profit organization Protected Harvest and carry a label informing retailers and consumers of the grower's compliance.

The Lodi Rules program includes the Pesticide Environmental Assessment System (PEAS), which measures the environmental impact of pesticides, organic or synthetic, foreign or domestic. The vineyard must not exceed a maximum number of pesticide impact points. Certification is assessed annually.
