= Victor Stolan =

British hotelier and environmentalist

Victor Anthony Stolan (né Viktor Steinreich; born 1893) was a British hotelier and environmentalist. He provided "the germ of the idea" that led Julian Huxley and Max Nicholson with him to start the World Wildlife Fund. They, together with others they recruited, founded the organisation on 11 September 1961 in Switzerland.

Originally a Czechoslovak refugee, Stolan became a naturalised UK citizen in 1951. He was a businessman and hotel owner. He died within a few years of the start of the WWF.

== Role in starting WWF ==
Victor Stolan, born 1893 in Czechoslovakia, wrote to Julian Huxley, the author of three articles about the disappearance of wild life in Africa that first appeared on 13 November 1960 in The Observer with "The germ of the idea that was to result in the birth of the World Wildlife Fund". In this letter, dated 6 December 1960, Stolan argued that an international appeal aiming to raise millions of pounds should be set up on behalf of all wild species threatened by extinction. It "urged Huxley to put him in touch with a "single and uninhibited mind… with whom ideas can be developed and speedilly [sic] directed towards accumulating some millions of pounds without mobilising commissions, committees etc as there is no time for Victorian procedure". Huxley responded by putting him in contact with Max Nicholson who saw the logic of his argument and encouraged Victor to write a memorandum about setting up such a fund. This memorandum has been described as "brilliant, lengthy and eccentric". It argued that help should be sought from the Pope and Archbishop of Canterbury: "Nobody is in too high a place to lend a hand to defend creation." He also argued that "new tycoons" be asked for money to create a "shining monument in history".

Nicholson checked the plausibility of setting up such a fund by showing the memorandum to Guy Mountfort, the head of a major advertising agency. This was, as "Nicholson later acknowledged, a turning point." As a result, in May 1961, a meeting was held that included Peter Scott (the WWF's first chairman) as well as the three initiators.

== Exclusion ==
In the spring and summer of 1961, there were more meetings but Victor Stolan came to be excluded from them. In a letter to Huxley, Nicholson wrote, "Mr Stolan is rather too much the naive enthusiast and rather too little the practical man of affairs to be very much help," Stolan's history as an hotelier was also counted against him: "an unfortunate experience with a country hotel". Nicholson also made prejudicial remarks about his Czechoslovak background. Another factor could have been that unlike all the other founders of the WWF, Stolan was not like them an ornithologist nor earlier involved in conservationism.

Victor Stolan died within a few years of the founding of the WWF.
