= World Wildlife Fund =

International non-governmental environmental organization

- World Wide Fund for Nature
- Logo used since 2000 (Note: The logo's panda symbol has been in use since 1986.)
- Abbreviation: WWF
- Formation: 29 April 1961; 65 years ago
- Founders: Prince Bernhard of Lippe-Biesterfeld; Prince Philip, Duke of Edinburgh; Sir Julian Huxley; Max Nicholson; Sir Peter Scott; Guy Mountfort; Godfrey A. Rockefeller
- Type: International NGO
- Purpose: Environmentalism; Conservation; Ecology
- Headquarters: Rue Mauverney 28; Gland, Switzerland
- Region served: Worldwide
- Methods: Lobbying; Research; Consultancy
- President: Adil Najam
- Director General: Kirsten Schuijt
- Revenue: ▲US$433 million (2022)
- Website: wwf.panda.org worldwildlife.org (US)
- b: Also WWF's first president.

WWF is a Swiss-based international non-governmental organization that works in the field of wilderness preservation and the reduction of human impact on the environment. It was founded in 1961 as the World Wildlife Fund. The official name of the Swiss umbrella organization and in some countries is World Wide Fund for Nature following a renaming (retaining the abbreviation WWF), while World Wildlife Fund remains the official name in other countries, including Canada and the United States. WWF is the world's largest conservation organization, with over 5 million supporters worldwide, working in more than 100 countries and supporting around 3,000 conservation and environmental projects. It has invested over $1 billion in more than 12,000 conservation initiatives since 1995. WWF is a foundation with 65% of funding from individuals and bequests including The 1001: A Nature Trust, 17% from government sources (such as the World Bank, Foreign Office, and USAID) and 8% from corporations in 2020.

WWF aims to "stop the degradation of the planet's natural environment and to build a future in which humans live in harmony with nature." Living Planet Report has been published every two years by WWF since 1998; it is based on a Living Planet Index and ecological footprint calculation. In addition, WWF has launched several notable worldwide campaigns, including Earth Hour and the debt-for-nature swap, and its current work is organized around these six areas: food, climate, freshwater, wildlife, forests, and oceans.

WWF has faced criticism for its corporate ties and for support of conservation measures that have resulted in violent conflict with local people.

== History ==
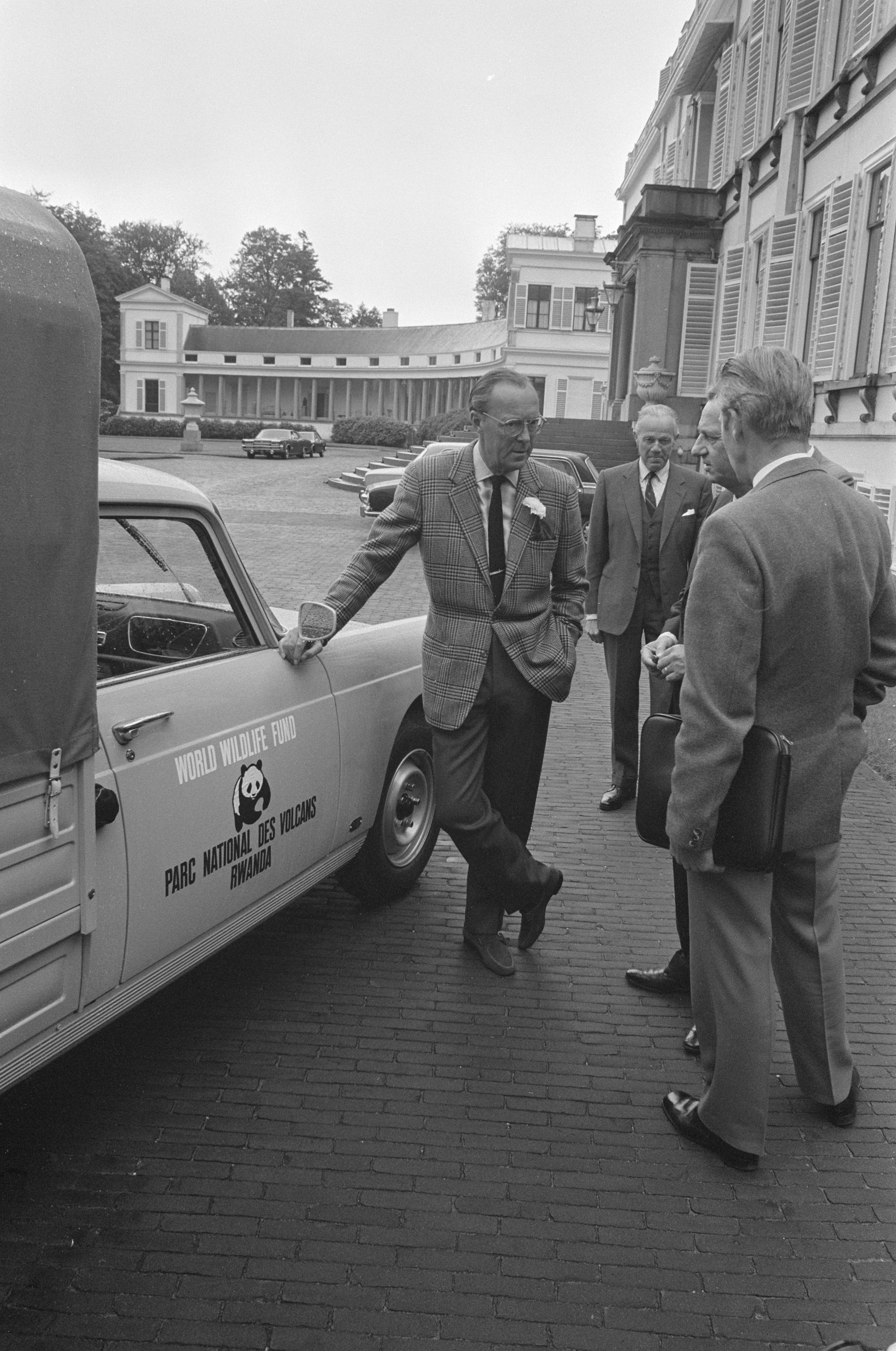
Prince Bernhard with a WWF field vehicle, 1971

The idea for a fund on behalf of endangered animals was officially proposed by Victor Stolan to Sir Julian Huxley in response to articles he published in the British newspaper The Observer. This proposal led Huxley to put Stolan in contact with Edward Max Nicholson, a person who had had 30 years of experience in linking progressive intellectuals with big business interests through the Political and Economic Planning think tank. Nicholson thought up the name of the organization and the original panda logo was designed by Sir Peter Scott. WWF was conceived on 29 April 1961, under the name of World Wildlife Fund. Its first office was opened on 11 September in IUCN's headquarters at Morges, Switzerland.

WWF was conceived to act as an international fundraising organization to support the work of existing conservation groups, primarily the International Union for Conservation of Nature. Its establishment was marked with the signing of the Morges Manifesto, the founding document that sets the fund's commitment to assisting worthy organizations struggling to save the world's wildlife:

They need above all money, to carry out mercy missions and to meet conservation emergencies by buying land where wildlife treasures are threatened, and in many other ways. Money, for example, to pay guardians of wildlife refuges .... Money for education and propaganda among those who would care and help if only they understood. Money to send out experts to danger spots and to train more local wardens and helpers in Africa and elsewhere. Money to maintain a sort of 'war room' at the international headquarters of conservation, showing where the danger spots are and making it possible to ensure that their needs are met before it is too late.

— Morges Manifesto

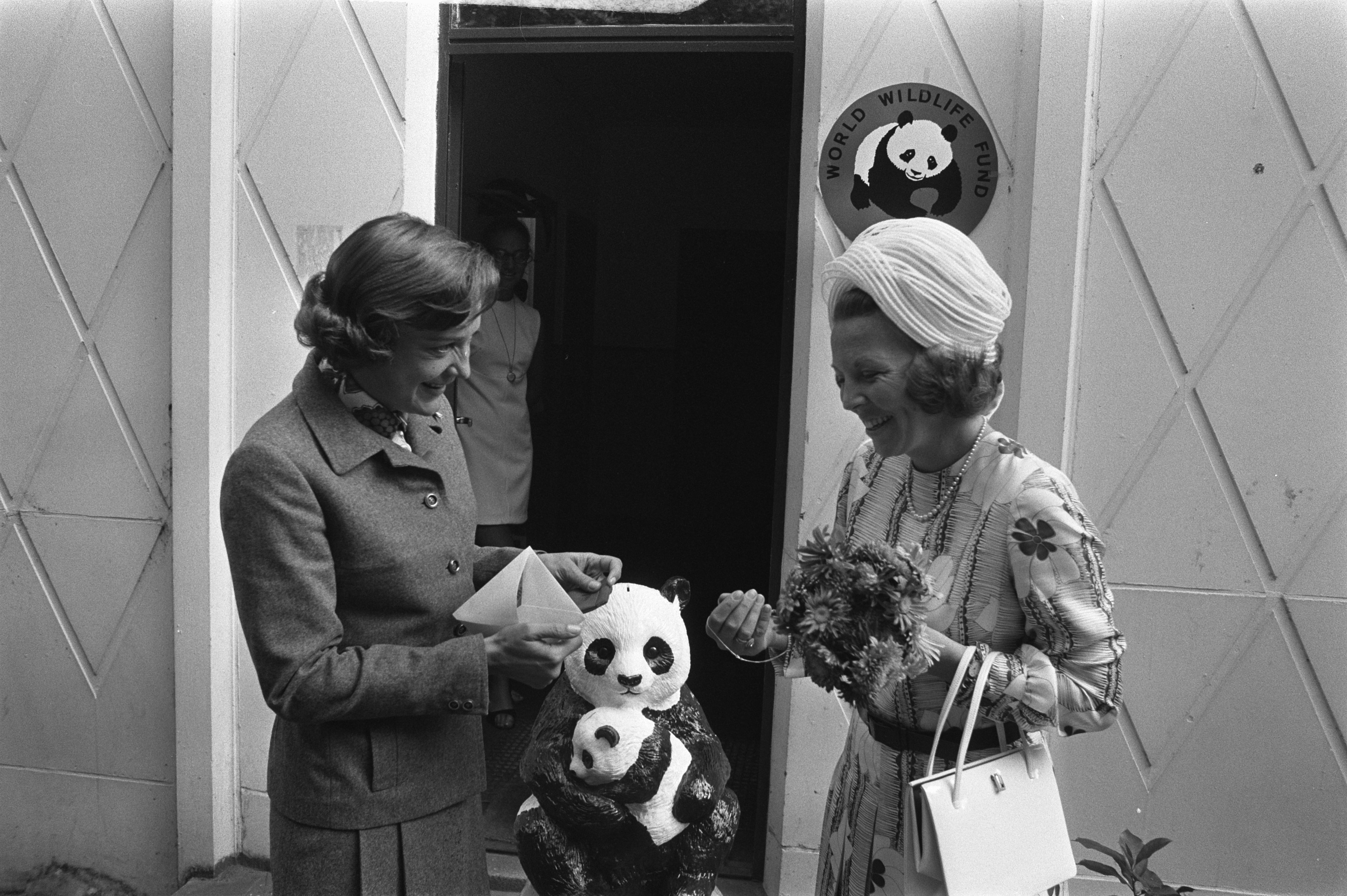
Princess Beatrix visiting the organization, 1971

Prince Bernhard of Lippe-Biesterfeld helped to found WWF, becoming its first president in 1961. In 1963, the Foundation held a conference and published a major report warning of anthropogenic global warming, written by Noel Eichhorn based on the work of Frank Fraser Darling (then foundation vice president), Edward Deevey, Erik Eriksson, Charles Keeling, Gilbert Plass, Lionel Walford, and William Garnett.

In 1970, along with Prince Philip, Duke of Edinburgh, and a few associates, Bernhard established WWF's financial endowment The 1001: A Nature Trust to handle the organization's administration and fundraising. 1001 members each contributed $10,000 to the trust. Prince Bernhard resigned his post after being involved in the Lockheed bribery scandals.

=== List of presidents ===
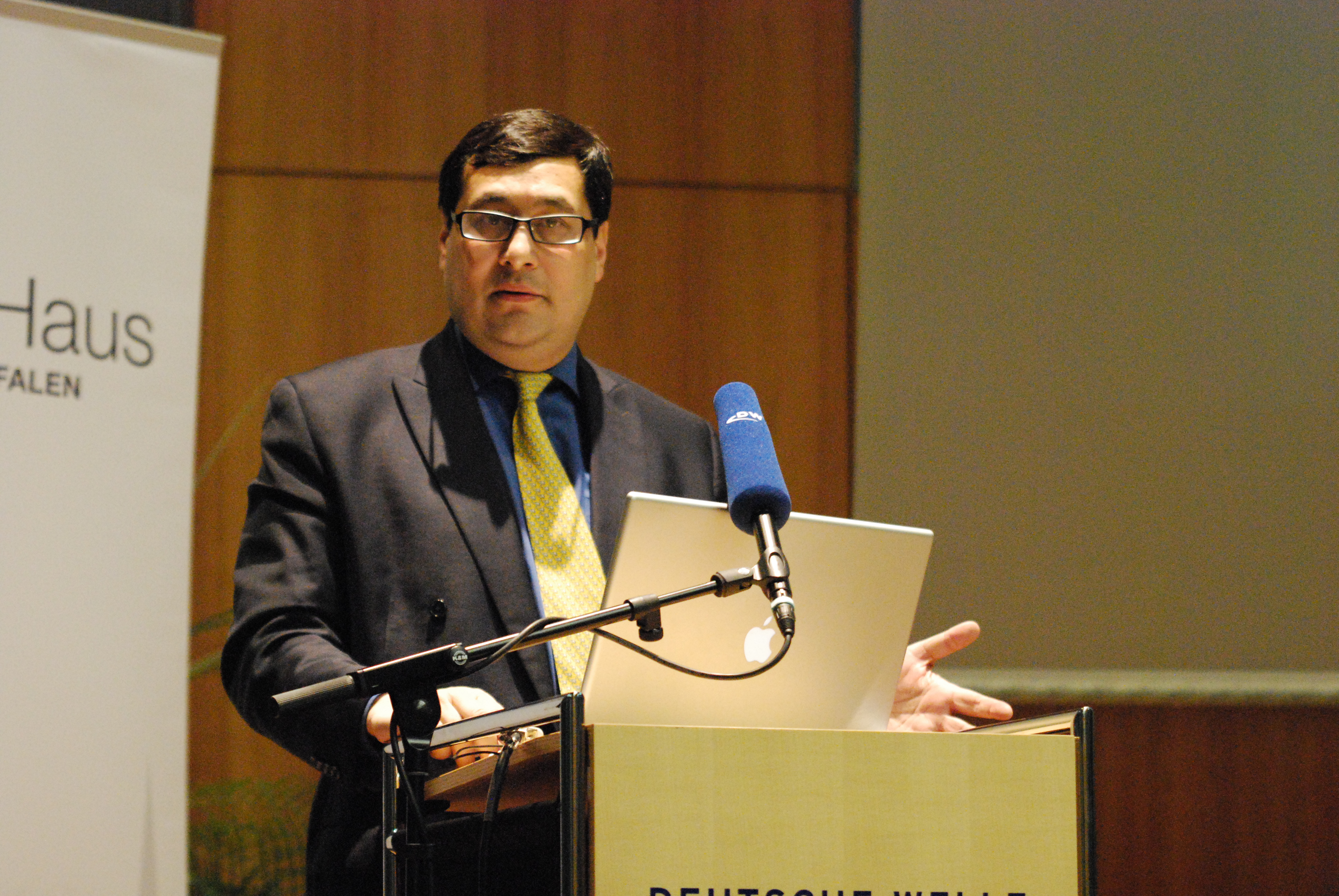
Dr. Adil Najam from Pakistan is WWF's current president since 2023.

Years	Name	Country
1961–1976	Prince Bernhard of Lippe-Biesterfeld	Netherlands
1976–1981	John Hugo Loudon	Netherlands
1981–1996	Prince Philip, Duke of Edinburgh	United Kingdom
1996–1999	Syed Babar Ali	Pakistan
2000	Ruud Lubbers	Netherlands
2000–2001	Sara Morrison	United Kingdom
2001–2010	Chief Emeka Anyaoku	Nigeria
2010–2017	Yolanda Kakabadse	Ecuador
2018–2022	Pavan Sukhdev	India
2023–present	Adil Najam	Pakistan

=== Recent developments ===
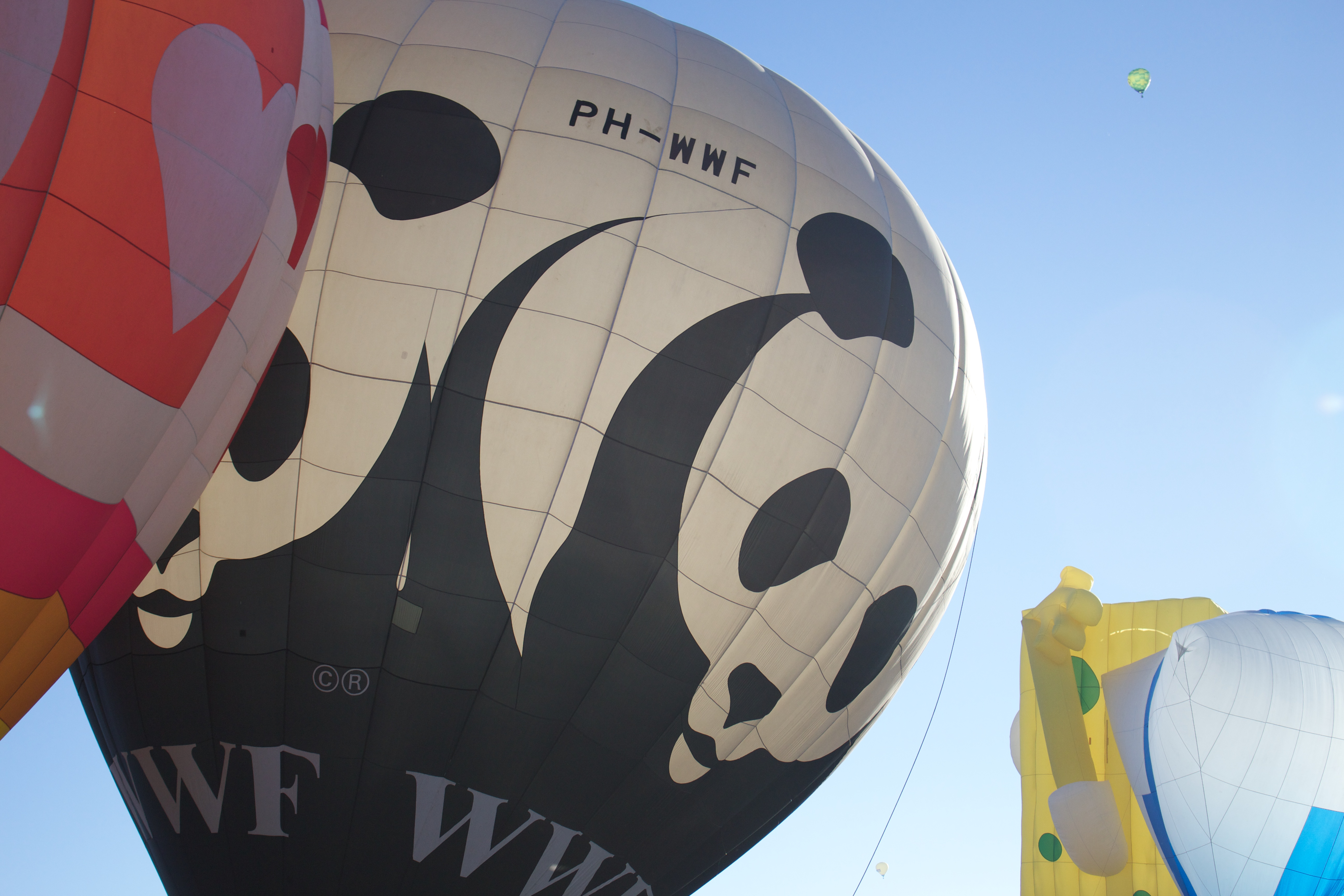
A WWF hot air balloon in Mexico, 2013

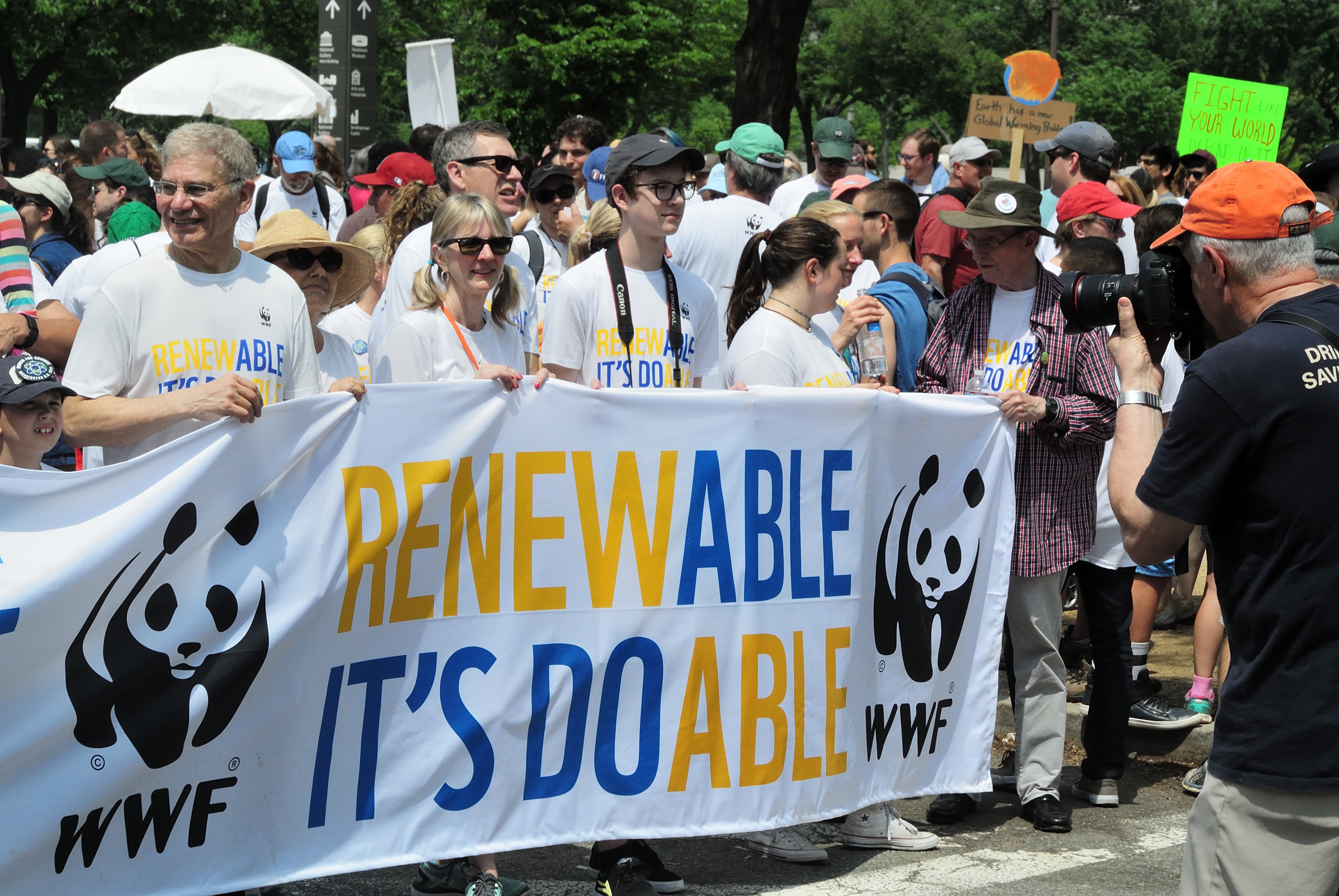
WWF at the People's Climate March, 2017

WWF has set up offices and operations around the world. It originally worked by fundraising and providing grants to existing non-governmental organizations with an initial focus on the protection of endangered species. As more resources became available, its operations expanded into other areas such as the preservation of biological diversity, sustainable use of natural resources, the reduction of pollution, and climate change. The organization also began to run its own conservation projects and campaigns. In 1986, the organization changed its name to World Wide Fund for Nature, while retaining the WWF initials. However, it continued at that time to operate under the original name in the United States and Canada.

1986 was the 25th anniversary of WWF's foundation, an event marked by a gathering in Assisi, Italy to which the organization's International President Prince Philip, the Duke of Edinburgh, invited religious authorities representing Buddhism, Christianity, Hinduism, Islam, and Judaism. These leaders produced The Assisi Declarations, theological statements showing the spiritual relationship between their followers and nature that triggered a growth in the engagement of these religions with conservation around the world.

In the 1990s, WWF revised its mission statement to:

Stop the degradation of the planet's natural environment and to build a future in which humans live in harmony with nature,

- conserving the world's biological diversity;
- ensuring that the use of renewable natural resources is sustainable; [and]
- promoting the reduction of pollution and wasteful consumption.

WWF researchers and many others identified 238 ecoregions that represent the world's most biologically outstanding terrestrial, freshwater, and marine habitats, based on a worldwide biodiversity analysis which the organization says was the first of its kind. In the early 2000s (decade), its work was focused on a subset of these ecoregions, in the areas of forest, freshwater and marine habitat conservation, endangered species conservation, climate change, and the elimination of the most toxic chemicals.

We shan't save all we should like to, but we shall save a great deal more than if we had never tried.

— Sir Peter Scott

Harvard University published a case study on WWF titled "Negotiating Toward the Paris Accords: WWF & the Role of Forests in the 2015 Climate Agreement": In 2023, Adil Najam, a globally renowned climate scientist and policy expert from Pakistan, was appointed as the president of WWF International signifying the growing importance on climate change as well as of human well-being in the WWF agenda.

== Conservation Foundation ==
In 1947, the Conservation Foundation was formed in New York City by Fairfield Osborn. It arranged funding for scientific research into global conservation issues. It did not lobby or engage in politics. In 1985, it became an affiliate of WWF. In 1990, it completely merged into WWF.

=== Conservation Foundation in the United States ===
The organization now known as the Conservation Foundation in the United States is the former Forest Foundation of DuPage County. In 1996, the organization obtained general consultative status from UNESCO.

== Panda symbol ==
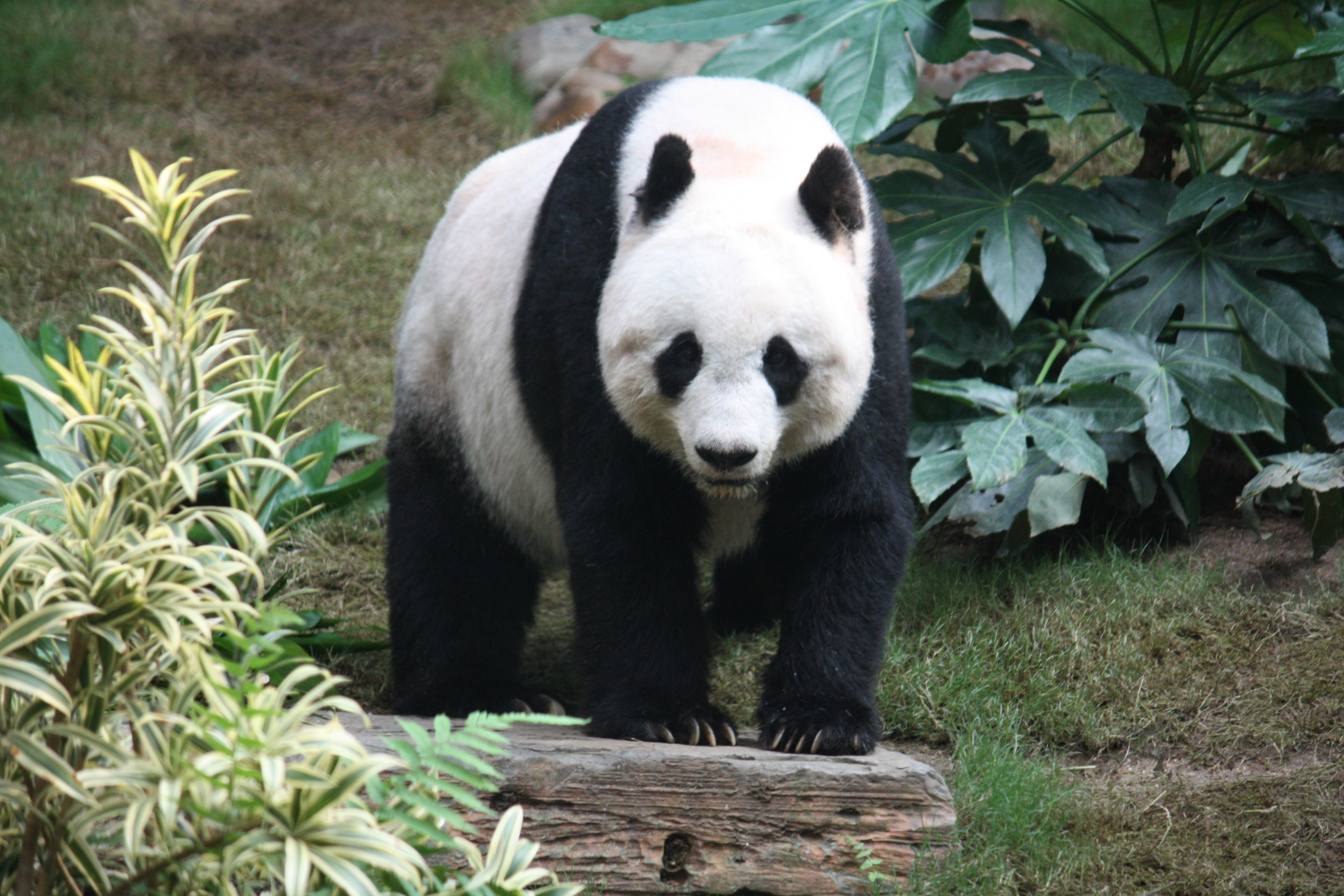
The giant panda has become the symbol of WWF.

WWF's giant panda logo originated from a panda named Chi Chi that had been transferred from the Beijing Zoo to the London Zoo in 1958, three years before WWF was established. Being famous as the only panda residing in the Western world at that time, her uniquely recognisable physical features and status as an endangered species were seen as ideal to serve the organization's need for a strong recognisable symbol that would overcome all language barriers. The organization also needed an animal that would have an impact in black and white printing. The logo was then designed by Sir Peter Scott from preliminary sketches by Gerald Watterson, a Scottish naturalist.

The logo, simplified and made geometric in 1978, then was stylized and made less detailed in 1986 at the time that the organization changed its name, with the revised version featuring solid black shapes for eyes. In 2000, a change was made to the font used for the initials WWF in the logo.

== Organization and operation ==
=== Policy-making ===
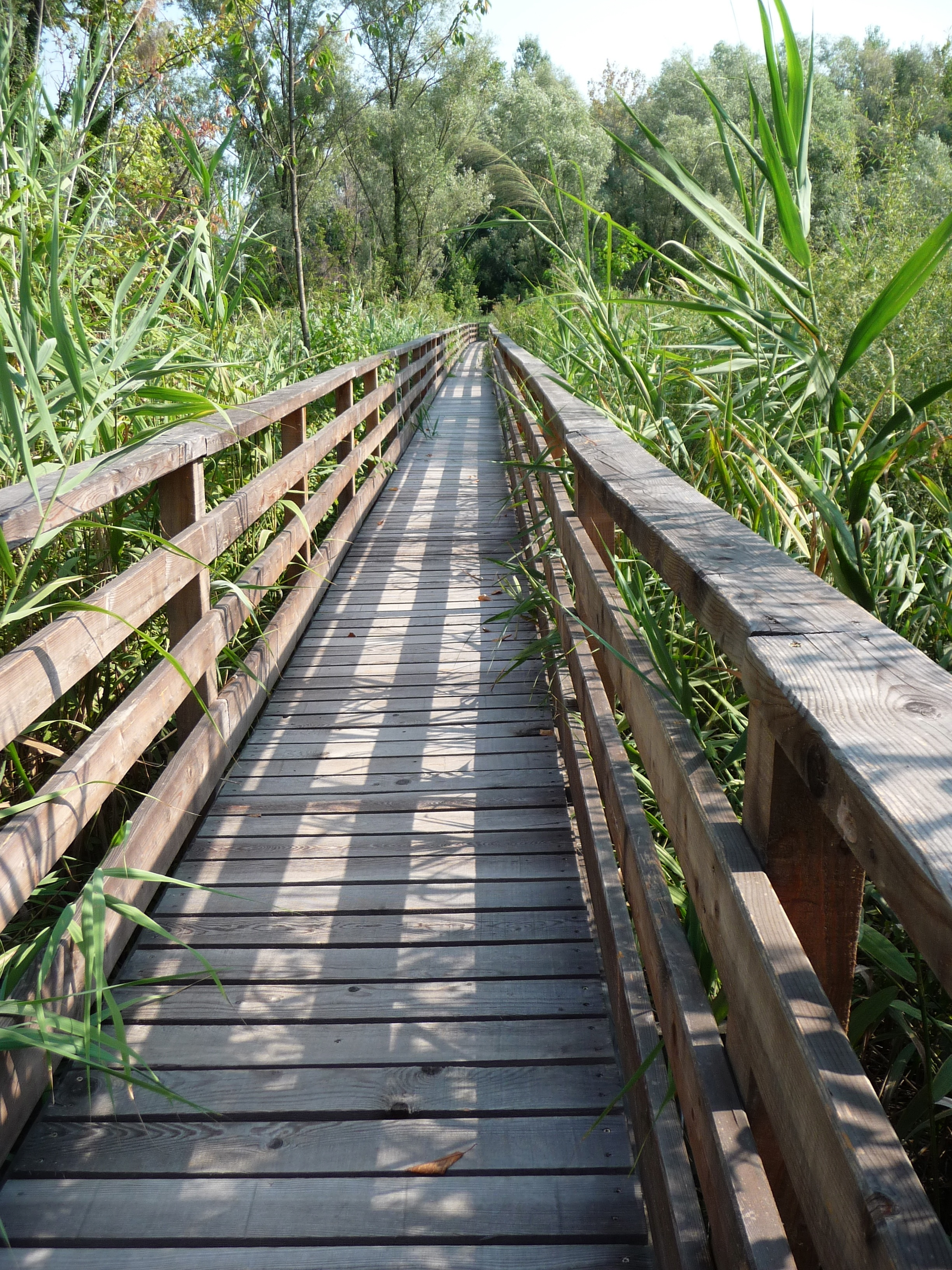
The nature reserve, Oasis of Stagni di Casale, managed by WWF in Vicenza, Italy

Policies of WWF are made by board members elected for three-year terms. An executive team guides and develops WWF's strategy. There is also a national council which stands as an advisory group to the board and a team of scientists and experts in conservation who research for WWF.

National and international law plays an important role in determining how habitats and resources are managed and used. Laws and regulations become one of the organization's global priorities.

WWF has been opposed to the extraction of oil from the Canadian tar sands and has campaigned on this matter. From 2008 to 2010, WWF worked with The Co-operative Group, the UK's largest consumer co-operative to publish reports which concluded that (1) exploiting the Canadian tar sands to their full potential would be sufficient to bring about what they described as 'runaway climate change'; (2) carbon capture and storage (CCS) technology cannot be used to reduce the release of carbon dioxide into the atmosphere to a level comparable to that of other methods of oil extraction; (3) the $379 billion which is expected to be spent extracting oil from tar sands could be better spent on research and development in renewable energy technology; and (4) the expansion of tar sands extraction poses a serious threat to the caribou in Alberta .

The organization convinces and helps governments and other political bodies to adopt, enforce, strengthen and/or change policies, guidelines, and laws that affect biodiversity and natural resource use. It also ensures consent by governments and/or keeps their commitment to international instruments relating to the protection of biodiversity and natural resources.

In 2012, David Nussbaum, chief executive of WWF-UK, spoke out against the way shale gas is used in the UK, saying: "... the Government must reaffirm its commitment to tackling climate change and prioritise renewables and energy efficiency."

=== Collaboration ===
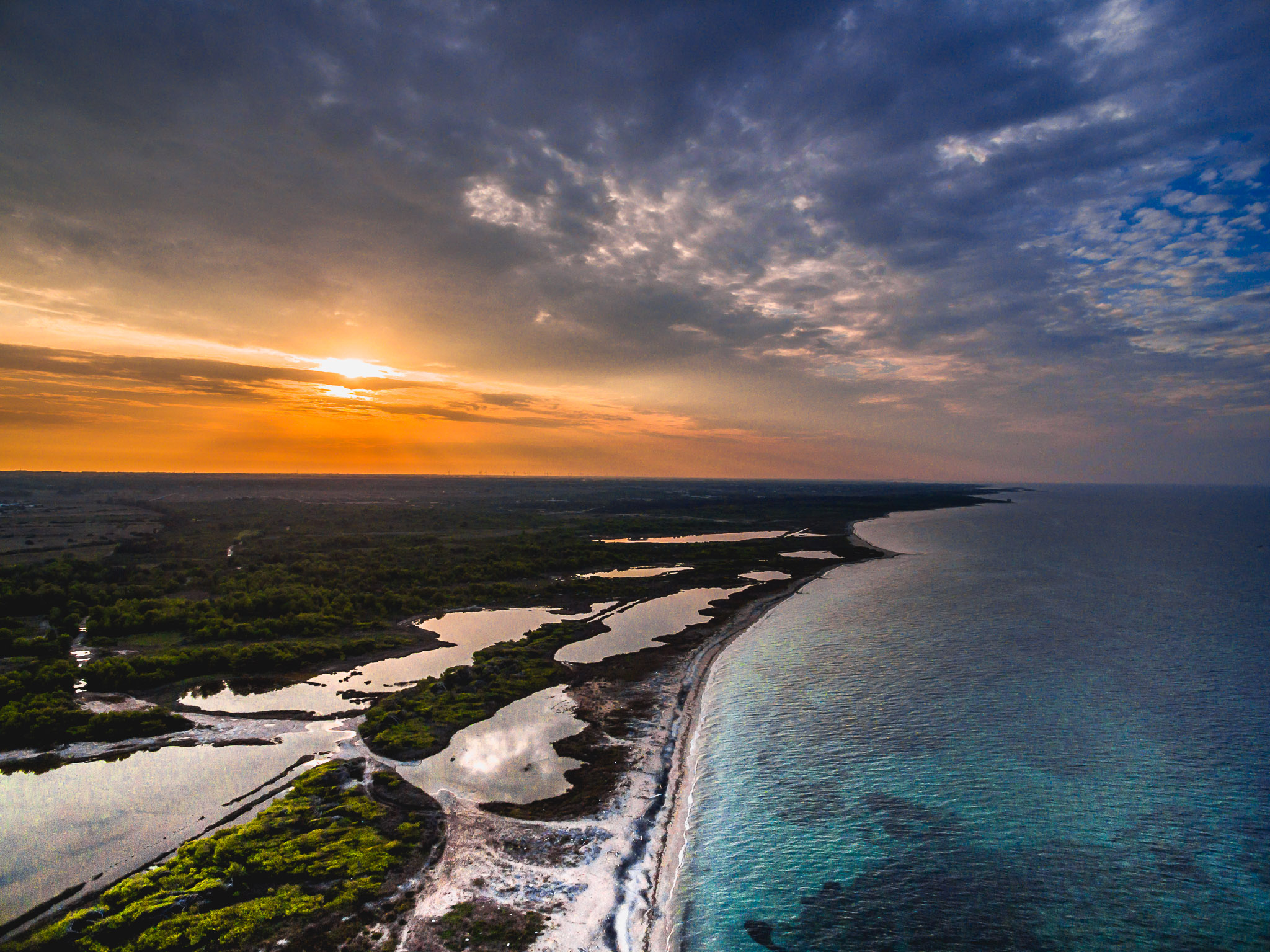
Le Cesine, a natural wetlands in Italy, managed by WWF since 1979

The organization works on a number of global issues driving biodiversity loss and unsustainable use of natural resources, including species conservation, finance, business practices, laws, and consumption choices. Local offices also work on national or regional issues.

WWF works with a large number of different groups to achieve its goals, including other NGOs, governments, business, investment banks, scientists, fishermen, farmers and local communities. It also undertakes public campaigns to influence decision makers, and seeks to educate people on how to live in a more environmentally friendly manner. It urges people to donate funds to protect the environment. The donors can also choose to receive gifts in return.

In October 2020, WWF was named as one of the alliance partner's of Prince William's Earthshot Prize to find solutions to environmental issues.

In March 2021, WWF announced an extension of its partnership with H&M to address sustainable supply chain practices.

== Notable initiatives and programs ==
=== Campaigns ===
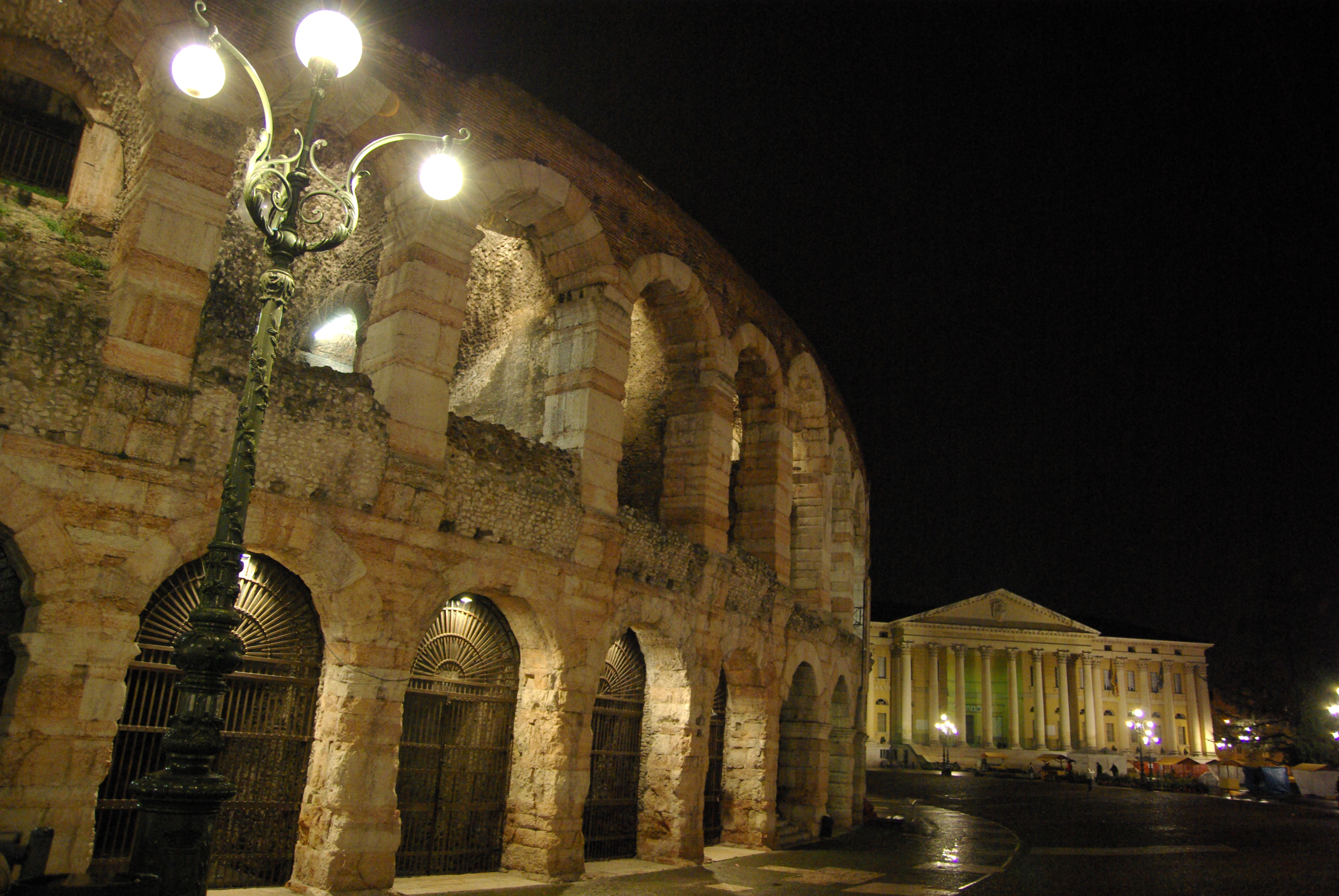
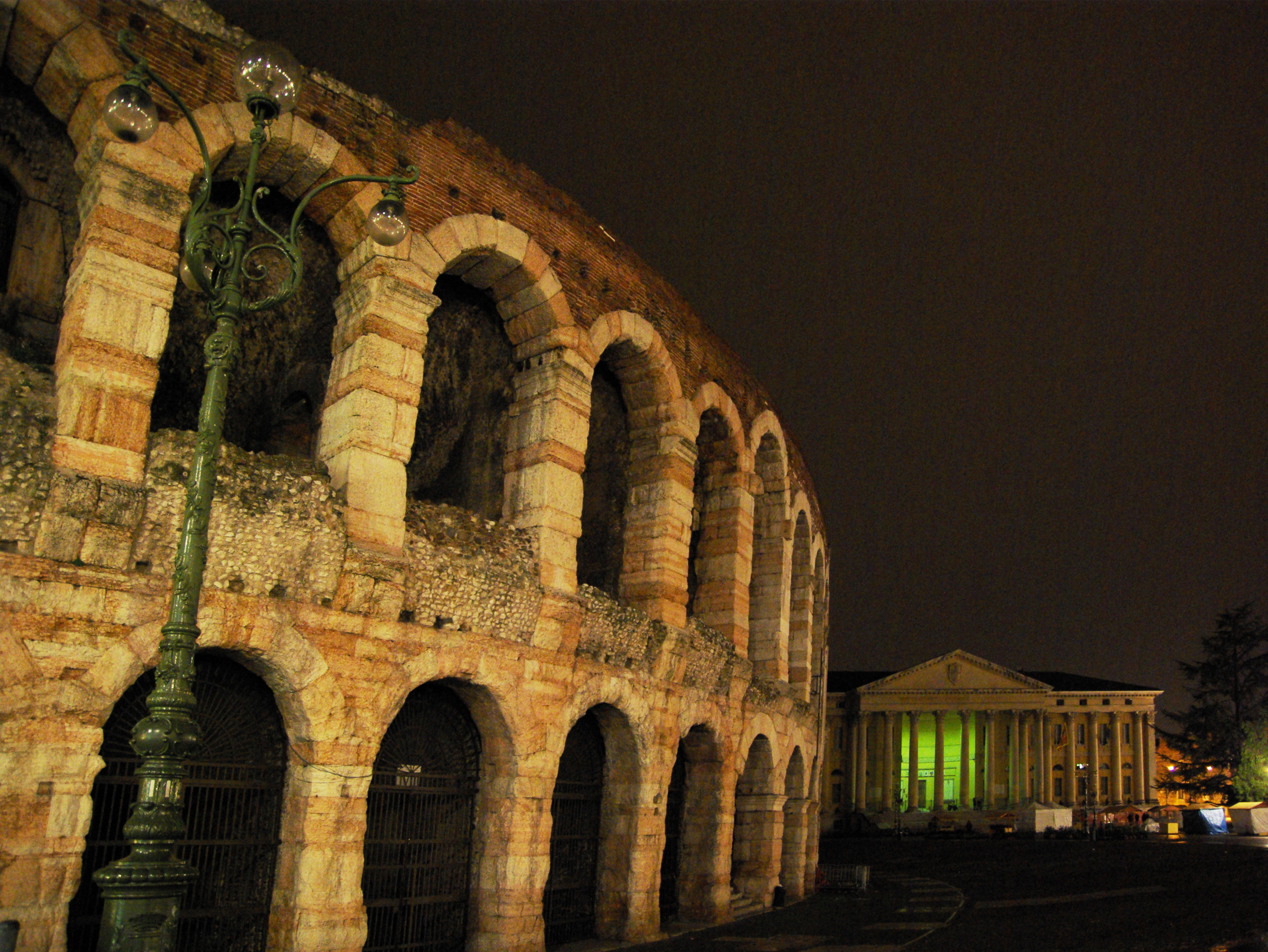
Earth Hour 2013 at the Verona Arena amphitheatre, Piazza Bra, Verona, Italy, before (top) and while the street lighting was switched off
- Debt-for-Nature Swap
- Earth Hour
- Healthy Grown
- Marine Stewardship Council

=== Publications ===
WWF publishes the Living Planet Index in collaboration with the Zoological Society of London. Along with ecological footprint calculations, the Index is used to produce a biennial Living Planet Report giving an overview of the impact of human activity on the world. In 2019, WWF and Knorr jointly published the Future 50 Foods report identifying "50 Foods for Healthier People and a Healthier Planet". In 2018, WWF, TRAFFIC and IFAW launched the Coalition to End Wildlife Trafficking Online with 21 tech companies. In 2017, Instagram accounts, Sal Lavallo and Jessica Nabongo ate a trafficked, endangered pangolin at a hotel in Gabon. There is often no penalty to social media accounts for cruelty to animals on social media platforms.

The organization also regularly publishes reports, fact sheets, and other documents on issues related to its work to raise awareness and provide information to policy and decision makers.

=== Promotions ===
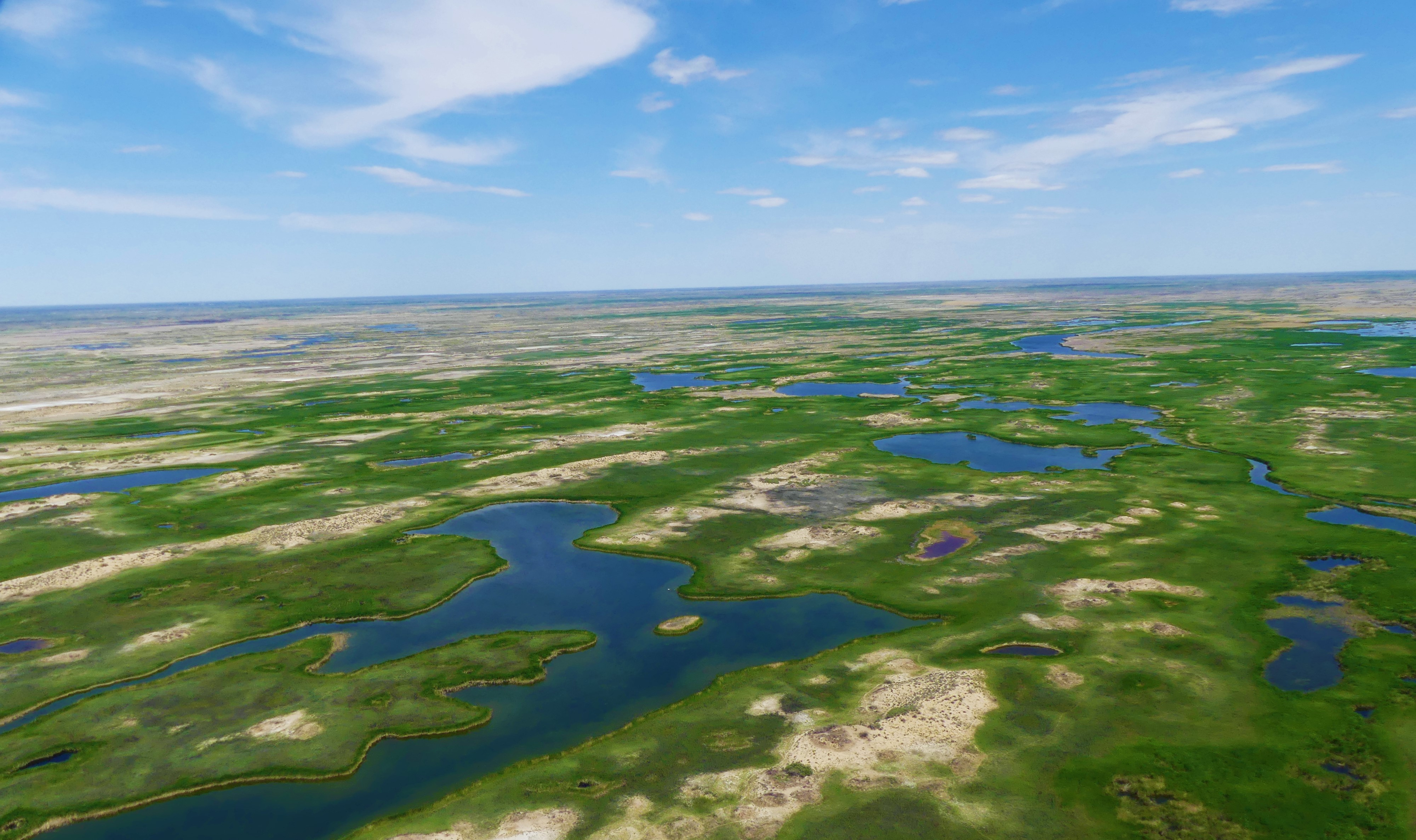
Multiple conservation projects by WWF at Ili-Balkhash in Kazakhstan

- No One's Gonna Change Our World was a charity album released in 1969 for the benefit of WWF.
- Peter Rose and Anne Conlon are music theatre writers, well known for their environmental musicals for children, who were commissioned by WWF-UK to write several environmental musicals as part of an education plan. Some were narrated by David Attenborough, and broadcast on television in numerous countries.
- The British pop group S Club 7 were ambassadors for WWF-UK during their time together as a band (1999–2003). Each of the members sponsored an endangered animal, and in 2000, travelled to the various locations around the world of their chosen animals for a seven-part BBC documentary series titled S Club 7 Go Wild.
- Environmentally Sound: A Select Anthology of Songs Inspired by the Earth is a benefit album released in 2006, for WWF-Philippines, featuring artists that included Up Dharma Down, Radioactive Sago Project, Kala, Johnny Alegre Affinity, Cynthia Alexander, and Joey Ayala.
- In June 2012, WWF launched an online music download store with fairsharemusic from which 50% of the profit goes to the charity.
- In April 2015, Hailey Gardiner released her solo EP, titled The Woods. In honour of Earth Day, and 15% of the proceeds made toward the purchase of the EP were donated to WWF.

=== Projects ===
In February 2026, it was announced that WWF will launch a 2026–2030 snow leopard conservation project in Mongolia which aims to protect the approximately 650 snow leopard population throughout four regions in Mongolia. The project is a continuation of the success of the 2018–2023 Future of the Land of Snow Leopard project.

=== Environmental education ===
From 1997 to 2007, WWF's office in China conducted its Environmental Educators' Initiative, which trained thousands of teachers, established environmental education training centres at teachers' universities, and influenced the drafting of the Ministry of Education's 2003 guidelines for public school environmental education.

== Controversies and disputes ==
=== The 1989 Philipson Report and The Cook Report ===
in 1990 ITV's The Cook Report made a programme on a controversial document known as The Philipson Report, This was a programme prompted by the confidential 1989 Phillipson Report into the many failings of the worldwide wildlife charity WWF, which had been leaked to The Cook Report & the show's presenter Roger Cook. That – and the programme’s first-hand evidence on the ground – stirred up a veritable hornet’s nest. The charity tried to have the programme pulled. Prince Philip, then the organization’s International President, issued an angry statement which wrongly accused the programme of stealing confidential documents, including the leaked Phillipson Report.

Despite all this, the broadcast went ahead and Prince Philip then had to admit publicly that a number of the fund’s strategies simply had not worked – and in particular, that the rhino, elephant and panda campaigns had, indeed, all been failures. The panda, he concluded, ‘was probably doomed’. WWF director general Charles de Haes resigned shortly afterwards.

=== Polar bear skin trade and CITES lobbying ===
The World Wide Fund for Nature (WWF) has faced criticism over its position on the international trade in polar bear skins and its opposition to proposals to list the species under Appendix I of the Convention on International Trade in Endangered Species of Wild Fauna and Flora (CITES). Polar bears (Ursus maritimus) are currently listed under Appendix II, which permits regulated international trade.

Proposals to uplist polar bears to Appendix I were submitted by the United States and Russia at CITES conferences in 2010 and 2013, citing concerns about declining Arctic sea ice, projected population declines, and the continuing international trade in polar bear skins. Appendix I listing would have prohibited international commercial trade in polar bear parts and derivatives.

WWF recommended that parties not support the proposals, arguing that the scientific criteria required for an Appendix I listing had not been met and that polar bears should remain listed under Appendix II. WWF stated that conservation policy should prioritise climate change and habitat loss, which it described as the principal threats to the species. WWF's position was outlined in briefing documents circulated ahead of the CITES meetings.

The issue gained renewed attention following a 2025 investigation by environmental journalist Adam Cruise published in The Guardian, which reported that WWF had actively opposed the Appendix I proposals during CITES negotiations and had advocated against stricter international trade restrictions on polar bear parts.

The controversy was also examined in the Swedish political magazine Fokus, which published an investigation titled "WWF – Isbjörnsjaktens dolda lobbyister" ("WWF – The hidden lobbyists of polar bear hunting"). The article examined WWF's role in international policy debates over polar bear trade and highlighted criticism that the organization's fundraising campaigns emphasise polar bear conservation while it has opposed proposals aimed at prohibiting international trade in polar bear skins.

An English-language analysis of the reporting was later published by journalist Arvid Grange, who examined WWF's lobbying positions within CITES negotiations and its broader conservation framework supporting regulated wildlife trade under certain conditions.

Critics have also pointed to statements by WWF representatives regarding the organization's role in international policy discussions on polar bear trade. Commentators have argued that, while WWF has stated it does not support the polar bear fur trade, its opposition to stricter CITES trade restrictions has helped maintain the legal international market for polar bear skins. In a 2017 statement cited in reporting, WWF Arctic Lead Specialist Brandon Laforest said that WWF had advocated "in international forums such as CITES to defend international polar bear trade."

WWF has described its position within a broader conservation framework supporting the "sustainable use" of wildlife, under which regulated harvesting and trade may be permitted where it is considered scientifically managed and beneficial to conservation or local communities.

Critics argue that this approach has allowed the continuation of the international commercial trade in polar bear skins, which originate primarily from legally hunted bears in Canada. Analyses of Canadian trade records have documented continued exports of polar bear skins to international markets during the 2010s and early 2020s.

Public criticism of WWF's position has also come from conservation advocates and public figures. In February 2025 British naturalist and broadcaster Chris Packham issued an open letter questioning WWF's stance on the polar bear skin trade and posted a widely shared video calling for greater scrutiny of the organization's policy.

The debate has also intersected with broader scientific discussions about polar bear conservation and management. In Nunavut, Canada, which contains a large proportion of the global polar bear population, wildlife authorities adopted a 1:1 male-to-female harvest ratio in 2019. The IUCN Polar Bear Specialist Group (PBSG) subsequently warned that increased female harvest levels could pose risks to population stability, noting that female bears are critical to population growth and that higher female mortality could lead to subpopulation declines.

WWF has rejected claims that it supports the polar bear fur trade. In response to the reporting, the organization stated that it "does not lobby for or work to support or promote the polar bear fur trade" and reiterated that its policy positions are based on scientific assessments and conservation priorities. WWF has maintained that the current Appendix II listing remains appropriate based on available scientific evidence.

=== River Wye report controversy ===
In March 2024, The Observer reported that WWF-UK had shelved an internal report examining pollution in the River Wye, raising questions about the organization's relationship with corporate partners. The report, titled Feeling the Bite, had been scheduled for publication in 2022 and examined environmental impacts of global food systems, including a case study on the ecological decline of the River Wye linked to intensive poultry farming in the catchment.

According to the investigation, the report warned that manure from poultry farms was contributing to phosphate pollution in the river. Sources cited in the article alleged that publication of the report was delayed and ultimately cancelled amid concerns that campaigners might highlight WWF's partnership with the supermarket chain Tesco, whose supply chain includes poultry producers in the region. WWF-UK had received more than £6 million from Tesco between 2018 and 2023 as part of a sustainability partnership.

WWF-UK denied the allegations, stating that the report had not been published because it "did not meet our rigorous standards" and that the decision was unrelated to its partnership with Tesco. Tesco also said it had no involvement in the report's development or publication decisions.

=== ARD documentary and PandaLeaks book ===
The German public television ARD aired a documentary on 22 June 2011 that claimed to show how WWF cooperates with corporations such as Monsanto, providing sustainability certification in exchange for donations – essentially greenwashing. WWF has denied the allegations. By encouraging high-impact eco-tourism, the program alleges that WWF contributes to the destruction of habitat and species it claims to protect while also harming indigenous peoples.

The filmmaker and investigative journalist Wilfried Huismann was sued by WWF over his documentary and the book Schwarzbuch WWF published in 2012, which was based on the documentary. In an out of court settlement, he agreed to remove or revise certain claims. Speaking on behalf of WWF Germany, Marco Vollmar indicated "[Huismann] draws a distorted picture of false statements, defamations and exaggerations, but we will accept that as expressions of opinion." (Translated from the original German: "ein Zerrbild aus falschen Aussagen, Diffamierungen und Übertreibungen, aber das werden wir als Meinungsäußerungen hinnehmen.")

In 2014, Huismann published a revised edition of his 2012 book, originally titled The Silence of the Pandas. The original edition had become a bestseller in Germany, but was banned from Britain until 2014 when it was released under the title of PandaLeaks – The Dark Side of the WWF after a series of injunctions and court orders. The book criticizes WWF for its involvement with corporations that are responsible for large-scale destruction of the environment, such as Coca-Cola, and gives details into the existence of the secret 1001 Club, whose members, Huismann claims, continue to have an unhealthy influence on WWF's policy making. WWF has denied the allegations made against it.

=== Corporate partnerships ===
WWF has been accused by the campaigner Corporate Watch of being too close to business to campaign objectively. WWF claims partnering with corporations such as Coca-Cola, Lafarge, Carlos Slim's, and IKEA will reduce their effects on the environment. WWF received €56 million from corporations in 2010 (an 8% increase in support from corporations compared to 2009), accounting for 11% of total revenue for the year.

For its 2019 fiscal year, WWF reported 4% of its total operating revenue coming from corporations.

=== Alleged human rights abuses by paramilitaries ===
In 2017, a report by Survival International claimed that WWF-funded paramilitaries are committing abuses against the indigenous Baka and Bayaka in the Congo Basin, who "face harassment and beatings, torture and death" as well as corrupting and aiding in the destruction of conserved areas. The report accused WWF and its guards of partnering with several logging companies who carried out deforestation while the rangers ignored wildlife trafficking networks.

In 2019, an investigation by BuzzFeed News alleged that paramilitary groups funded by the organization are engaged in serious human rights abuses against villagers, and the organization has covered up the incidents and acted to protect the perpetrators from law enforcement. These armed groups were claimed to torture, sexually assault, and execute villagers based on false accusations. In one instance found by BuzzFeed News investigators, an 11-year-old boy was allegedly tortured by WWF-funded rangers in front of his parents; WWF ignored all complaints against the rangers. In another incident, a ranger attempted to rape a Tharu woman, and when she resisted, he attacked her with bamboo stick until she lost consciousness. While the ranger was arrested, the woman was pressured not to press charges, resulting in the ranger going free. In 2010, WWF-sponsored rangers reportedly killed a 12-year-old girl who was collecting tree bark in Bardiya National Park. Park and WWF officials allegedly obstructed investigations in these cases by "falsifying and destroying evidence, falsely claiming the victims were poachers, and pressuring the families of the victims to withdraw criminal complaints".

In July 2019, Buzzfeed reported that a leaked report by WWF accused guards of beating and raping women, including pregnant women, while torturing men by tying their penises with fishing lines. The investigations were cut short after paramilitary groups threatened investigators with death. The investigators accused WWF of covering the crimes. Releasing an official statement, WWF claimed that the report was not made public to ensure the safety of the victims and that the guards were suspended and are awaiting prosecution. However, Buzzfeed accused the WWF of attempting to withhold the report to the U.S. congressional committee that was investigating the human rights violations by instead providing highly redacted versions.

In the Central African Republic, WWF officials were reportedly involved in an arms deal, where the organization paid for 15 Kalashnikov assault rifles and ammunition; but part of the money went unaccounted for and they were apparently defrauded by the CAR’s armed forces representatives selling the weapons.

The Kathmandu Post, which cooperated with BuzzFeed News on the investigations in Nepal, claimed there was intense lobbying efforts and political pressure to release WWF-funded rangers arrested for murder. They interviewed activists who claimed they were promised donations for pressuring victims of abuse to drop charges against the rangers. When the local Tharu community protested, WWF officials carried out a counter-protest in favour of the accused and used park elephants to block Prithvi Highway.

An investigation by Rainforest Foundation UK found evidence of widespread physical and sexual assault by "eco-guards" employed by the Salonga National Park in the Democratic Republic of Congo funded by the WWF. These include two cases of gang rape, two extrajudicial killings, and multiple accounts of torture and other forms of mistreatment committed by park guards.

In reply to the investigations, the WWF stated that it takes any allegations seriously and would launch an independent review into the cases raised. The organization stated it has stringent policies designed to ensure it and its partners are safeguarding the rights and well-being of indigenous peoples and local communities, and should the review uncover any breaches, that it is committed to taking swift action.

These accusations were central to a four-day, sit-in protest carried out by members of Extinction Rebellion's XR Youth Solidarity Network at WWF-UK's headquarters in September 2021.

=== World Wrestling Federation trademark dispute ===
In April 2000, the Fund began High Court proceedings in the United Kingdom against the United States-based World Wrestling Federation (WWF) for violating a prior agreement it had made in 1994 over usage of the "WWF" trademark. The Federation had begun using the "WWF" initials in 1979, and made their first trademark agreement with the Fund in 1989, amid international expansion.

In August 2001, the High Court ruled in favour of the Fund. The Federation filed appeals at the Court of Appeal in October 2001 and the House of Lords in February 2002. In May 2002, the Federation renamed itself as World Wrestling Entertainment (WWE).

=== Mekong River dolphins report ===
In June 2009, Touch Seang Tana, chairman of Cambodia's Commission for Conservation and Development of the Mekong River Dolphins Eco-tourism Zone, argued that WWF had misrepresented the danger of extinction of the Mekong dolphin to boost fundraising. The report stated that the deaths were caused by a bacterial disease that became fatal due to environmental contaminants suppressing the dolphins' immune systems. He called the report unscientific and harmful to the Cambodian government and threatened WWF's Cambodian branch with suspension unless they met with him to discuss his claims. Touch Seang Tana later said he would not press charges of supplying false information and would not make any attempt to prevent WWF from continuing its work in Cambodia, but advised WWF to adequately explain its findings and check with the commission before publishing another report. Criticism of the validity of reports critical of government action or inaction, where 'approval' has not been sought before publication, is common in Cambodia.

In January 2012, Touch Seang Tana signed the "Kratie Declaration on the Conservation of the Mekong River Irrawaddy Dolphin" along with WWF and the Cambodian Fisheries Administration, an agreement binding the parties to work together on a "roadmap" addressing dolphin conservation in the Mekong River.

=== Accountability ===
The Charity Navigator gave WWF a 3-star overall rating, a 2-star financial rating, and a 4-star accountability and transparency rating for the 2018 fiscal year.

=== Manipulation of CO_{2} emissions data from nuclear energy ===
In 2009, in a scorecard report that they authored on carbon emissions in G8 countries, WWF portrayed the greenhouse gas emissions of countries who use low-carbon nuclear power in their mix as a higher amount of emissions than realistically calculated. For example, for France, WWF displayed a false value of 362 gCO_{2}eq/kWh which is over 400% larger than the actual emissions in France. WWF explained the manipulation as follows:

WWF does not consider nuclear power to be a viable policy option. The indicators "emissions per capita", "emissions per GDP" and "CO_{2} per kWh electricity" for all countries have therefore been adjusted as if the generation of electricity from nuclear power had produced 350 gCO_{2}/kWh (emission factor for natural gas). Without the adjustment, the original indicators for France would have been much lower, e.g. 86 gCO_{2}/kWh.

The scorecard for Sweden was also "adjusted" in similar way, where WWF replaced the actual emissions of 47 gCO_{2}eq/kWh with 212 gCO_{2}eq/kWh.

=== Nord Stream involvement ===
In 2011 Jochen Lamp, head of WWF Germany, was also head of Conservation Foundation German Baltic, sponsored by Nord Stream AG company building a controversial gas pipeline from Russia to Germany. While WWF headed by Lamp has been actively blocking the project using court cases, Nord Stream reached "an out-of-court agreement" with the Foundation, which was also headed by Lamp, involving the transfer of €10 million, after which WWF withdrew the case.

=== Controversy on investments in multiple fossil fuel developments ===
Investigative journalism by NBC and later Naomi Klein, in 2008 and 2013 respectively, uncovered that WWF has invested and profits from multi-million dollar investment contracts it has put into oil, gas, coal, and tar sands developments and did not pull out of these, divesting, when confronted but indicated it would at the minimum wait until 2020 in some of its fossil fuel ventures, as early ending would have not been as profitable for them. WWF does not oppose fossil fuels but engages in what it internally terms as the "responsible development" of fossil fuels.

=== Proposal to sell non-fungible tokens ===
In February 2022, WWF UK released plans to raise funds through selling NFTs (non-fungible tokens), which are units of data stored on a blockchain. Critics point out transacting NFTs causes significant environmental impact.

=== Listing as a "foreign agent" and an "undesirable organisation" in Russia ===
On 10 March 2023, during the 2022 Russian invasion of Ukraine, WWF was listed as a so-called "foreign agent" in Russia for allegedly trying to influence the Russian authorities "under the guise of protecting nature and the environment".

About 20 weeks later, the Prosecutor-General of Russia designated it as a so-called "undesirable organization" on similar grounds. This decision effectively bans the group from operating in the country.

== Regional organisations ==
=== WWF-Australia ===
The Australian arm of WWF was established on 29 June 1978 in an old factory in Sydney with three staff and a budget of around A$80,000 for the first year, consisting of an A$50,000 grant from the Commonwealth Government and an additional A$20,500 in corporate donations. As of 2020, WWF-Australia is the country's biggest conservation organization and operates projects throughout Australia as well as the wider Oceania region. Between 2019 and 2024, WWF-Australia reported an average revenue of $57 million per year. In 2024, WWF-Australia declared revenue of $52.2 million (AUD) and 138.9 full-time equivalent staff.

In 1990, WWF-Australia established the national Threatened Species Network (TSN) with the federal government, which remained operational until 2009. In 1999 it participated in the creation of the Environment Protection and Biodiversity Conservation Act, at that time the most encompassing biodiversity conservation laws in the world. In 2003/4 the organization played a part in getting the government to raise the level of protection for the Great Barrier Reef and the Ningaloo Reef, and since then has participated in or managed many conservation programs, such as the reintroduction of black-flanked rock-wallabies to Kalbarri National Park in Western Australia.

=== Fundación Vida Silvestre Argentina ===
In Argentina, WWF is represented by Fundación Vida Silvestre Argentina, an independent organization which is also a part of the network.

== See also ==
- Centres of Plant Diversity
- Conservation movement
- Environmental Dispute Resolution Fund
- Environmental movement
- Eugene Green Energy Standard, founded by WWF
- Global 200, ecoregions identified by the WWF as priorities for conservation
- List of environmental organizations
- Natural environment
- Sustainability
- Sustainable development
- Traffic (conservation programme), a joint programme of WWF and the International Union for Conservation of Nature (IUCN)
- West Coast Environmental Law
- World Conservation Award, created in conjunction with WWF
