= Future 50 Foods report =

Report identifying plant-based sustainable foods

The Future 50 Foods report, subtitled "50 foods for healthier people and a healthier planet", was published in February 2019 by the World Wide Fund for Nature (WWF) and Knorr. It identifies 50 plant-based foods that can increase dietary nutritional value and reduce environmental impacts of the food supply, promoting sustainable global food systems.

== Description ==
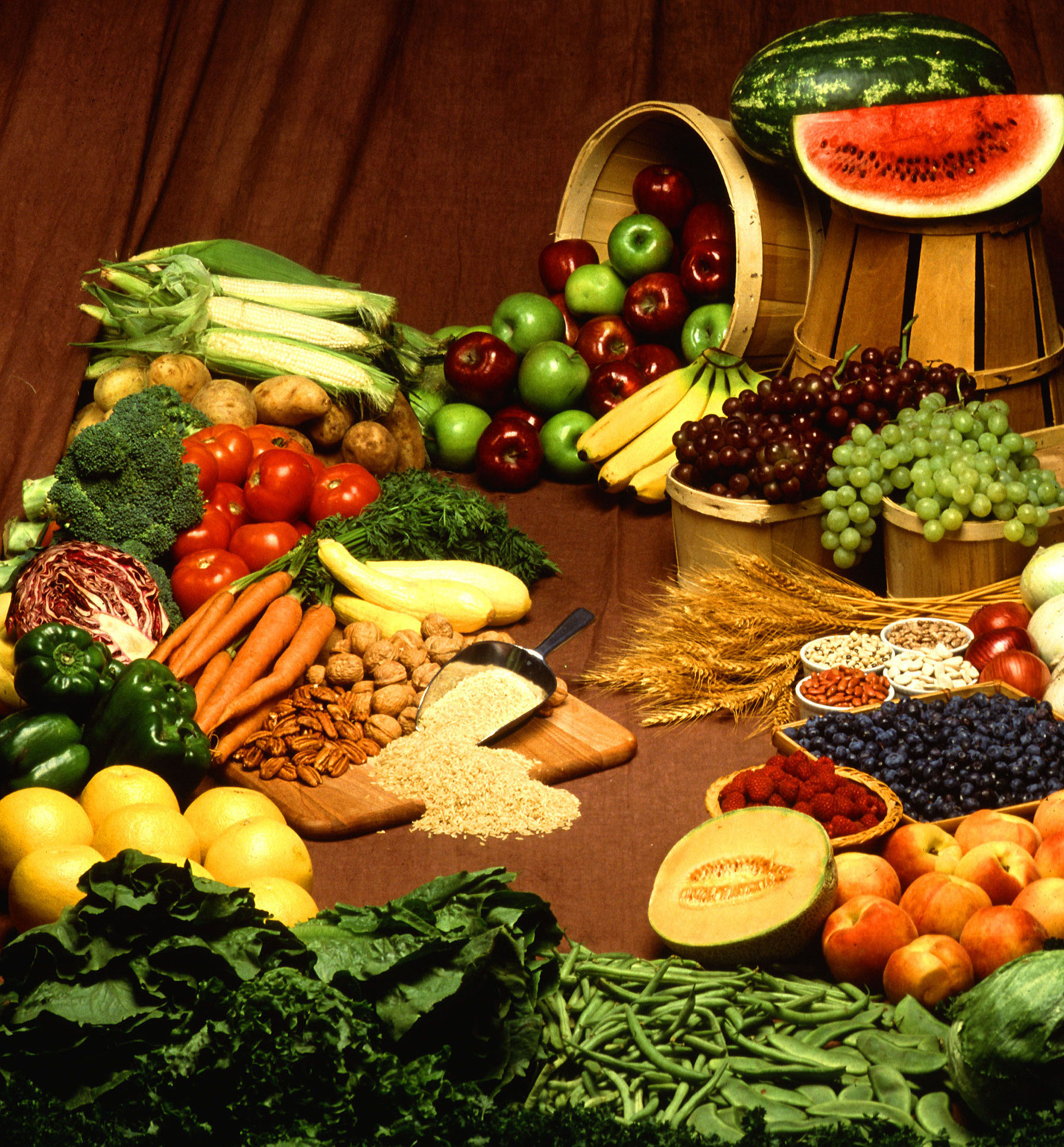
Plant-based diet

The report identifies 12 plant sources and five animal sources that make up 75 percent of the food humans consume, and three crops (wheat, corn and rice) accounting for about "60 percent of the plant-based calories in most diets". The report points out that lack of variety in food sources threatens food security, and "repeatedly harvesting the same crop on the same land depletes nutrients in the soil, leading to intensive use of fertilizers and pesticides that, when misused, can hurt wildlife and damage the environment".

The report offers five steps to identifying a future food: "focus on plant-based foods, optimize nutrient density, evaluate environmental impact, consider culture and flavor, and deliver diversity."

Criteria for inclusion on the list of 50 foods indicated they must be "highly nutritious, have as little impact on the environment as possible, affordable, accessible, and of course, tasty". The foods are grouped into categories:

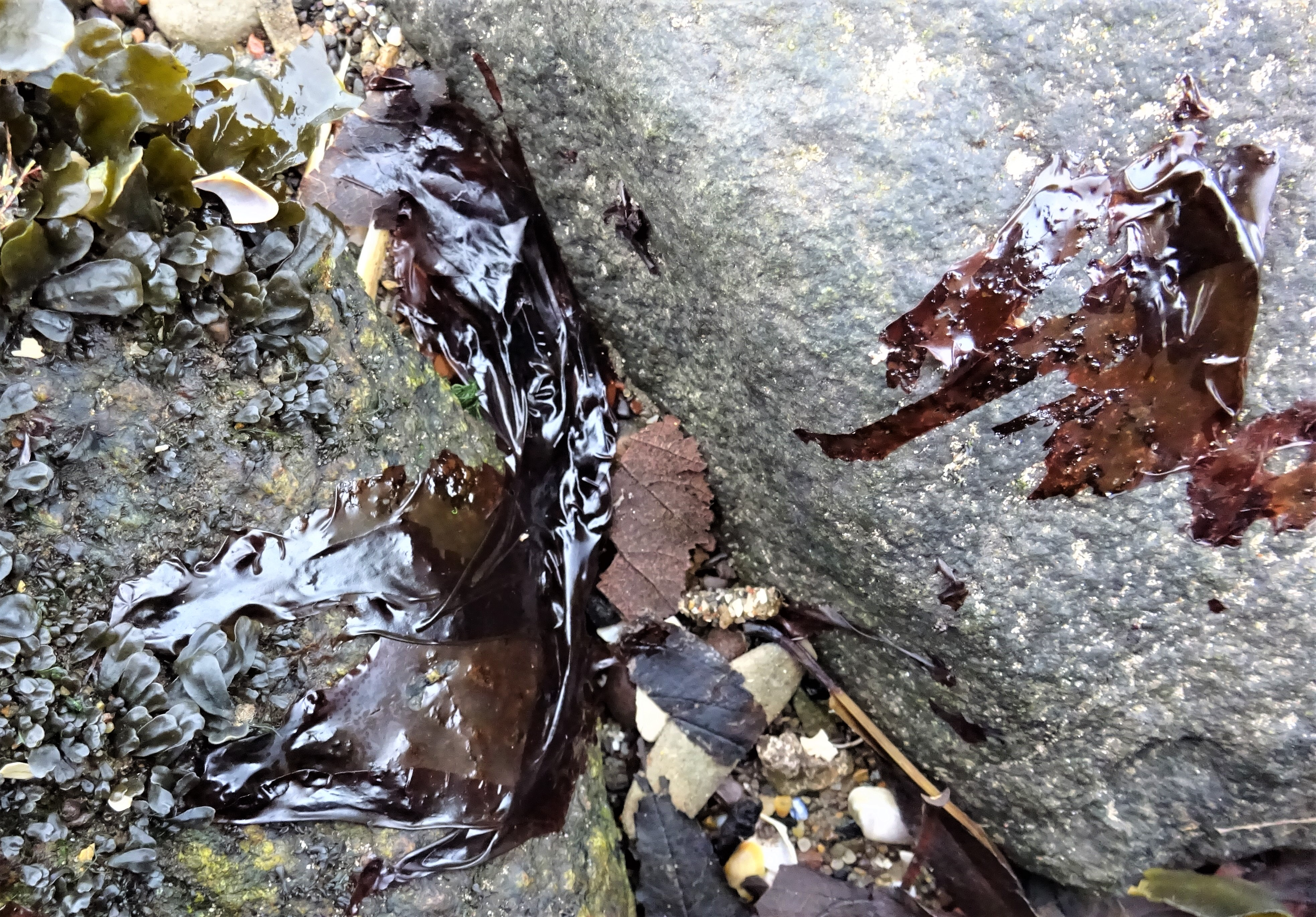
Laver seaweed, Porphyra umbilicalis

=== Algae ===
Algae contain essential fatty acids and antioxidants rich in protein, and are a potential replacement for meat.

1. Laver seaweed Porphyra umbilicalis

2. Wakame seaweed Undaria pinnatifida

=== Beans and pulses ===
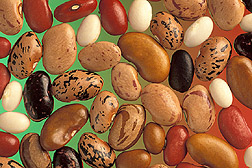
Black turtle beans

Beans are in the legume family, and are a source of fiber, protein and B vitamins.

3. Adzuki beans Vigna angularis

4. Black turtle beans Phaseolus vulgaris

5. Broad beans (fava beans) Vicia faba

6. Bambara groundnuts/Bambara beans Vigna subterranea

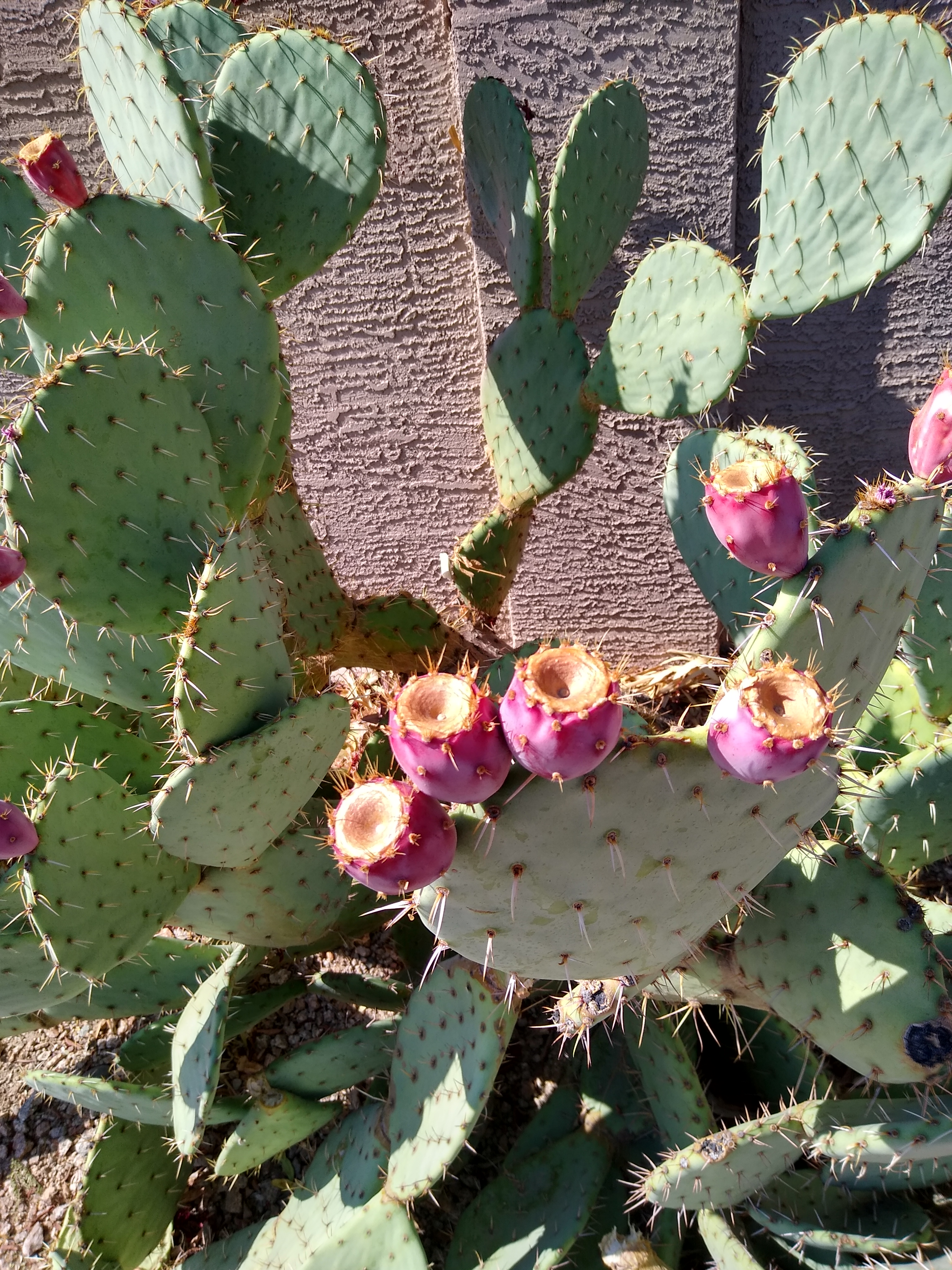
Nopales opuntia (Fruiting prickly pear)

7. Cowpeas Vigna unguiculata

8. Lentils Lens culinaris

9. Marama beans Tylosema esculentum

10. Mung beans Vigna radiata

11. Soy beans Glycine max

=== Cacti ===
Cacti contains vitamins C and E, carotenoids, fibre and amino acids.

12. Nopales Opuntia

=== Cereals and grains ===
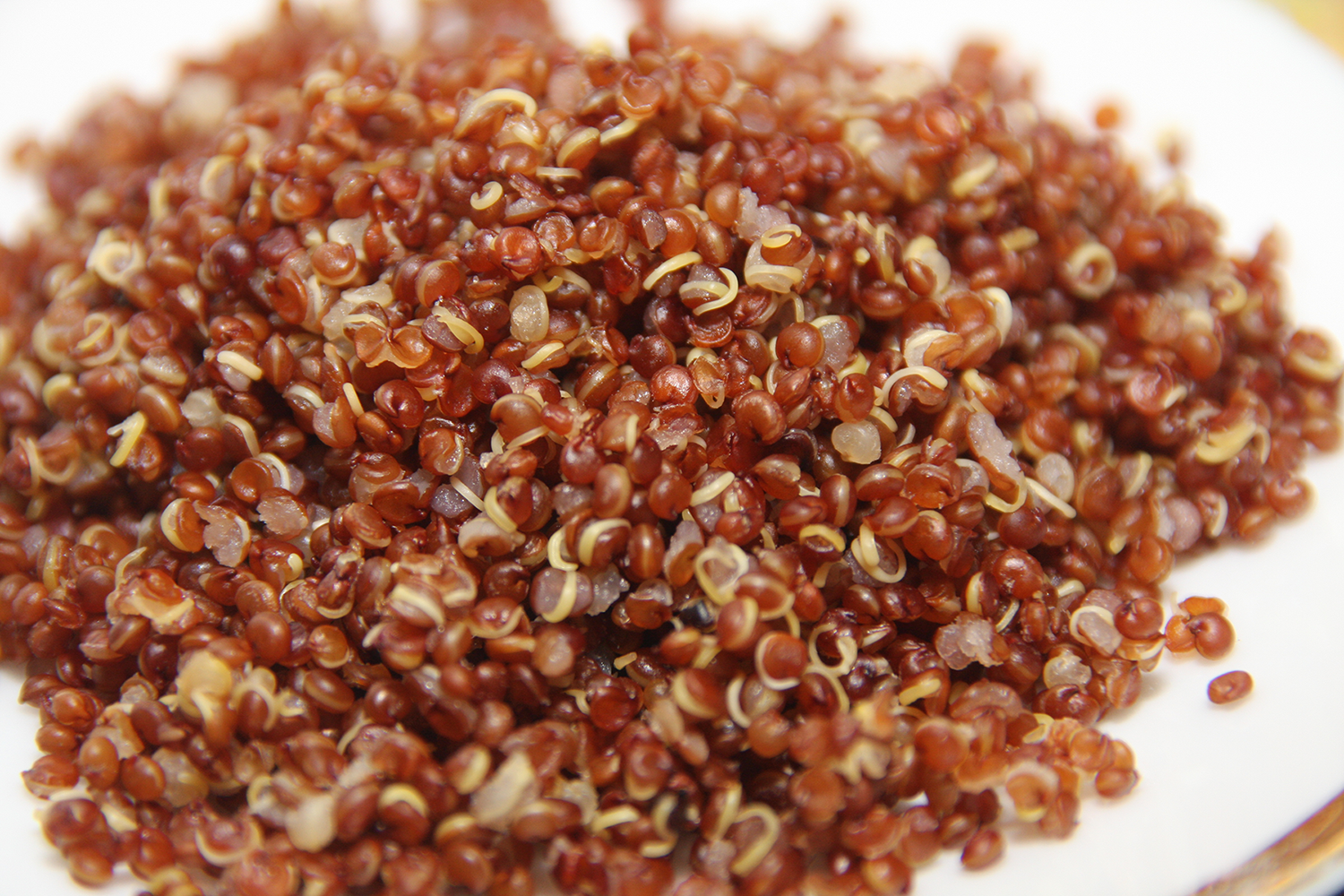
Red quinoa

These whole grains and cereals provide nutritional value and also improve soil health by diversifying sources of carbohydrates from current dependence on white rice, maize, and wheat.

13. Amaranth Amaranthus

14. Buckwheat Fagopyrum esculentum

15. Finger millet Eleusine coracana

16. Fonio Digitaria exilis

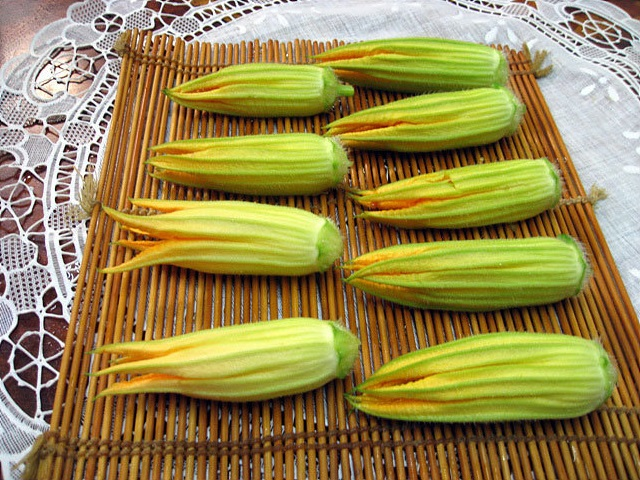
Pumpkin flowers

17. Khorasan wheat Triticum turanicum

18. Quinoa Chenopodium quinoa

19. Spelt Triticum spelta

20. Teff Eragrostis tef

21. Wild rice Zizania

=== Vegetable-like fruits ===
Compared to vegetables, these fruits are sweeter and usually contain more carbohydrates and water.

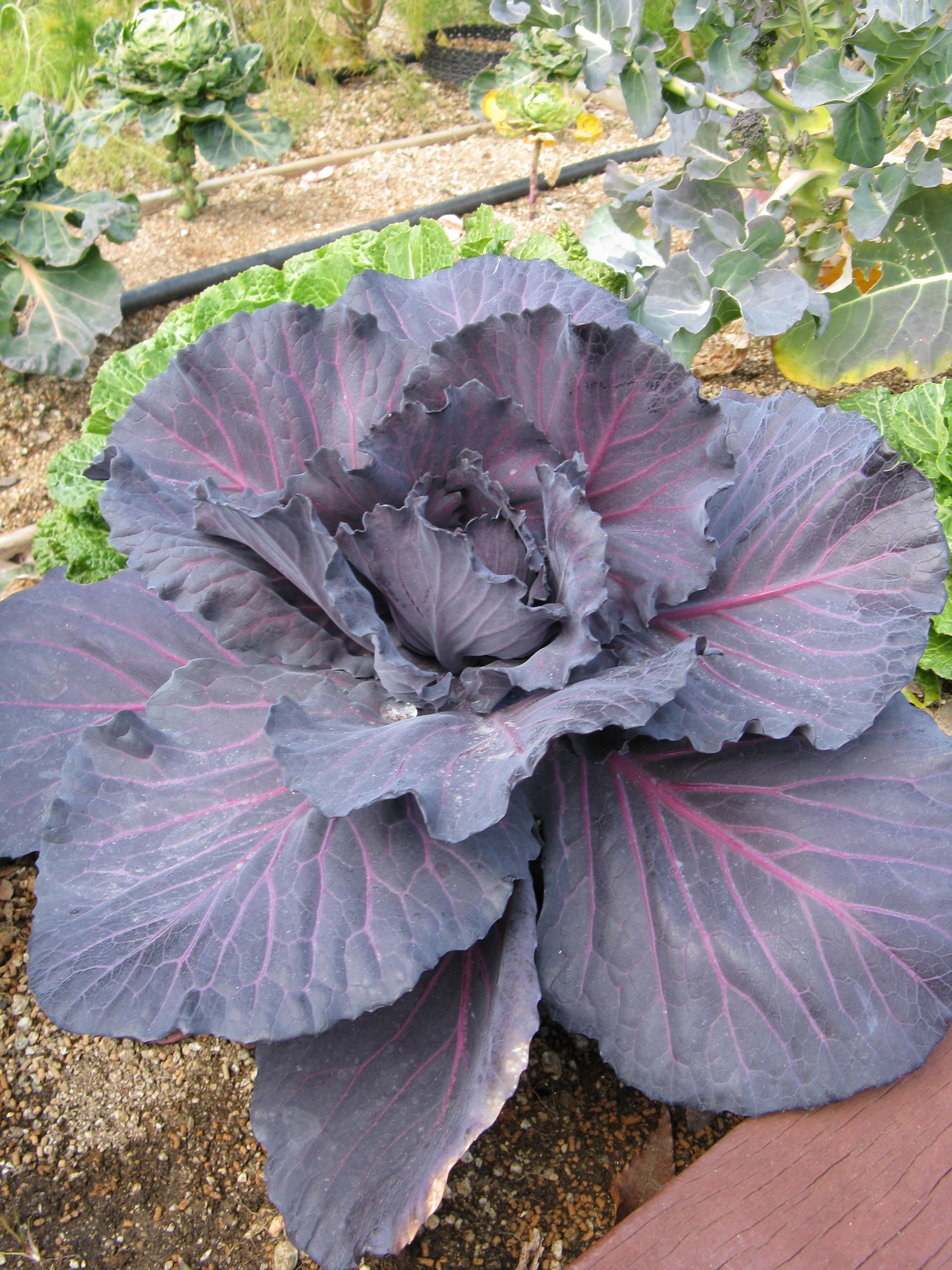
Red cabbage

22. Pumpkin flowers Cucurbita pepo

23. Orange tomatoes Solanum lycopersicum

24. Okra Abelmoschus esculentus

=== Leafy greens ===
Leafy greens contain dietary fiber, vitamins and minerals, and are low in calories.

25. Beet greens Beta vulgaris

26. Broccoli rabe Brassica ruvo

27. Kale Brassica oleracea var. sabellica

28. Moringa Moringa oleifera

29. Pak-choi or bok-choy (Chinese cabbage) Brassica rapa subsp. chinensis

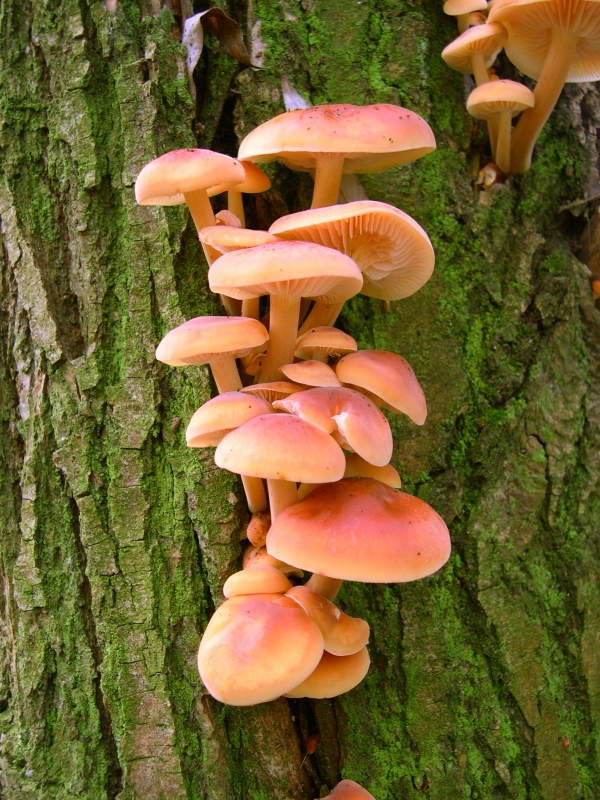
Enoki mushrooms

30. Pumpkin leaves Cucurbita pepo

31. Red cabbage Brassica rapa subsp. chinensis

32. Spinach Spinacia oleracea

33. Watercress Nasturtium officinale

=== Mushrooms ===
Mushrooms have high B vitamin content, as well as vitamin D, protein, and fiber.

34. Enoki mushrooms Flammulina velutipes

35. Maitake mushrooms Grifola frondosa

36. Saffron milk cap mushrooms Lactarius deliciosus

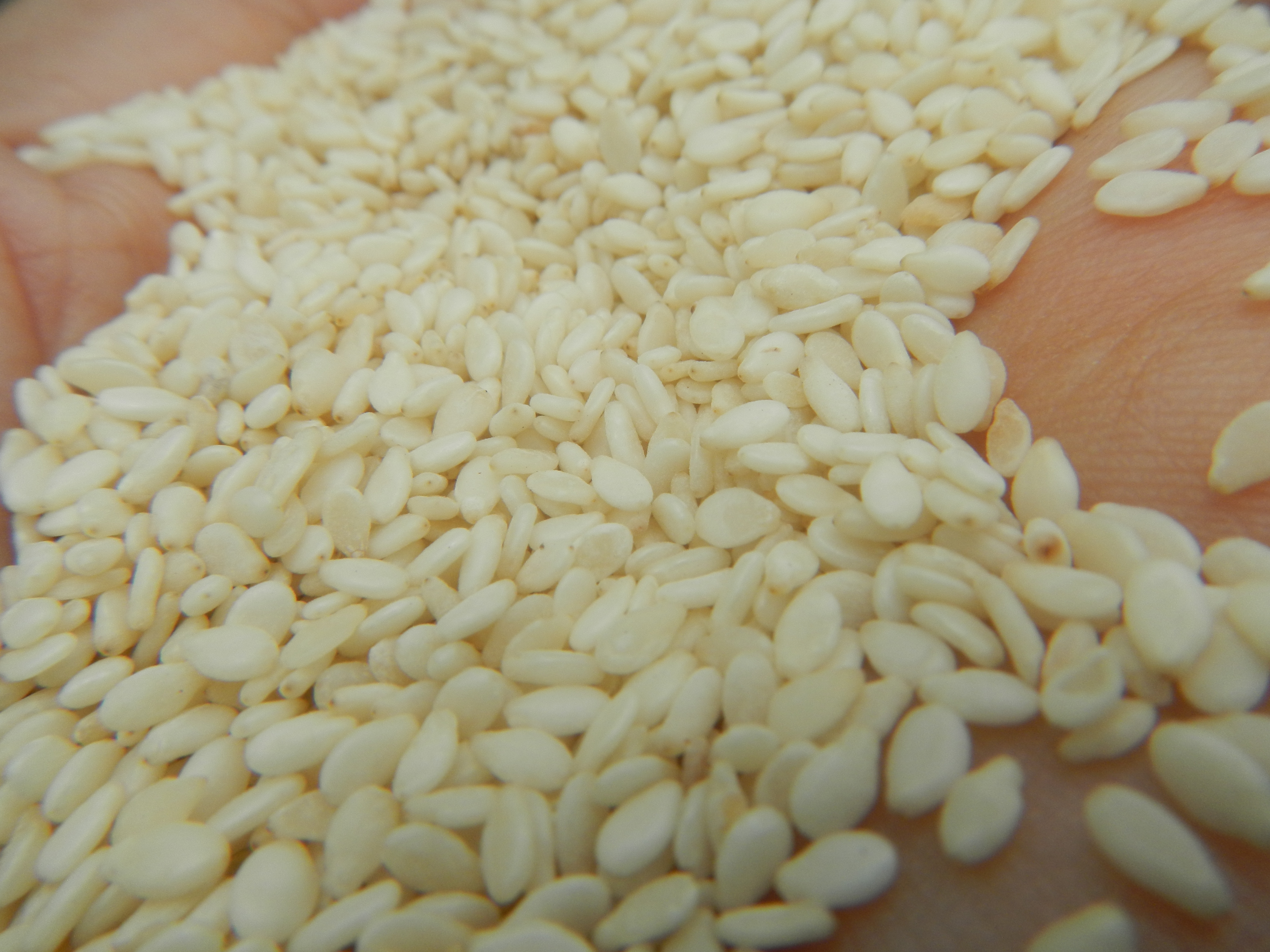
Sesame seeds

=== Nuts and seeds ===
Called "superfoods", these foods are high in protein, vitamin E, and "good fats".

37. Flax seeds Linum usitatissimum

38. Hemp seeds Cannabis sativa

39. Sesame seeds Sesamum indicum

40. Walnuts Juglans regia

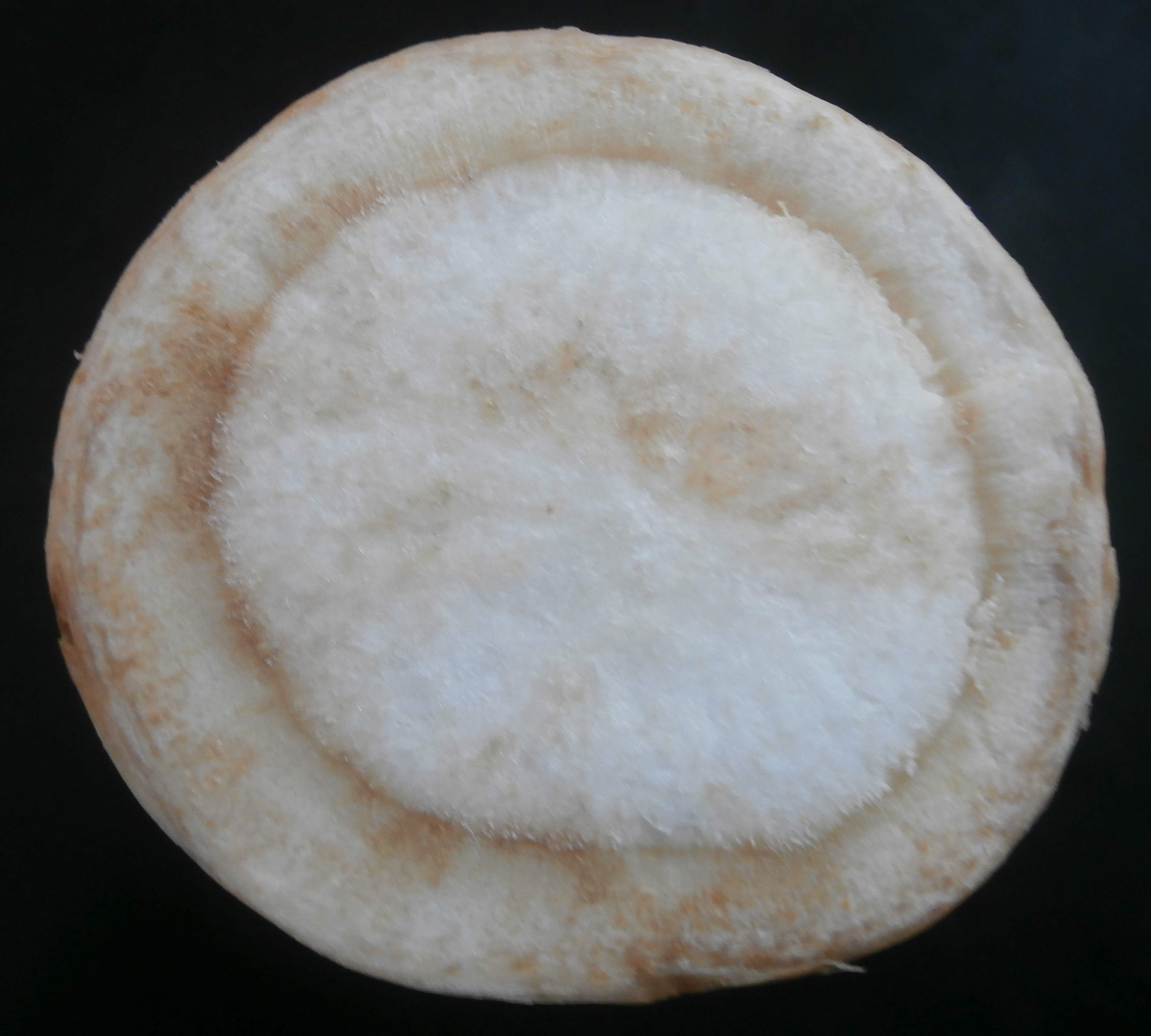
Parsley root cut

=== Root vegetables ===
Root vegetables have a broad variety of vitamins and minerals.

41. Black salsify Scorzonera hispanica

42. Parsley root Petroselinum crispum

43. White icicle radish (winter radish) Raphanus sativus var. Longipinnatus

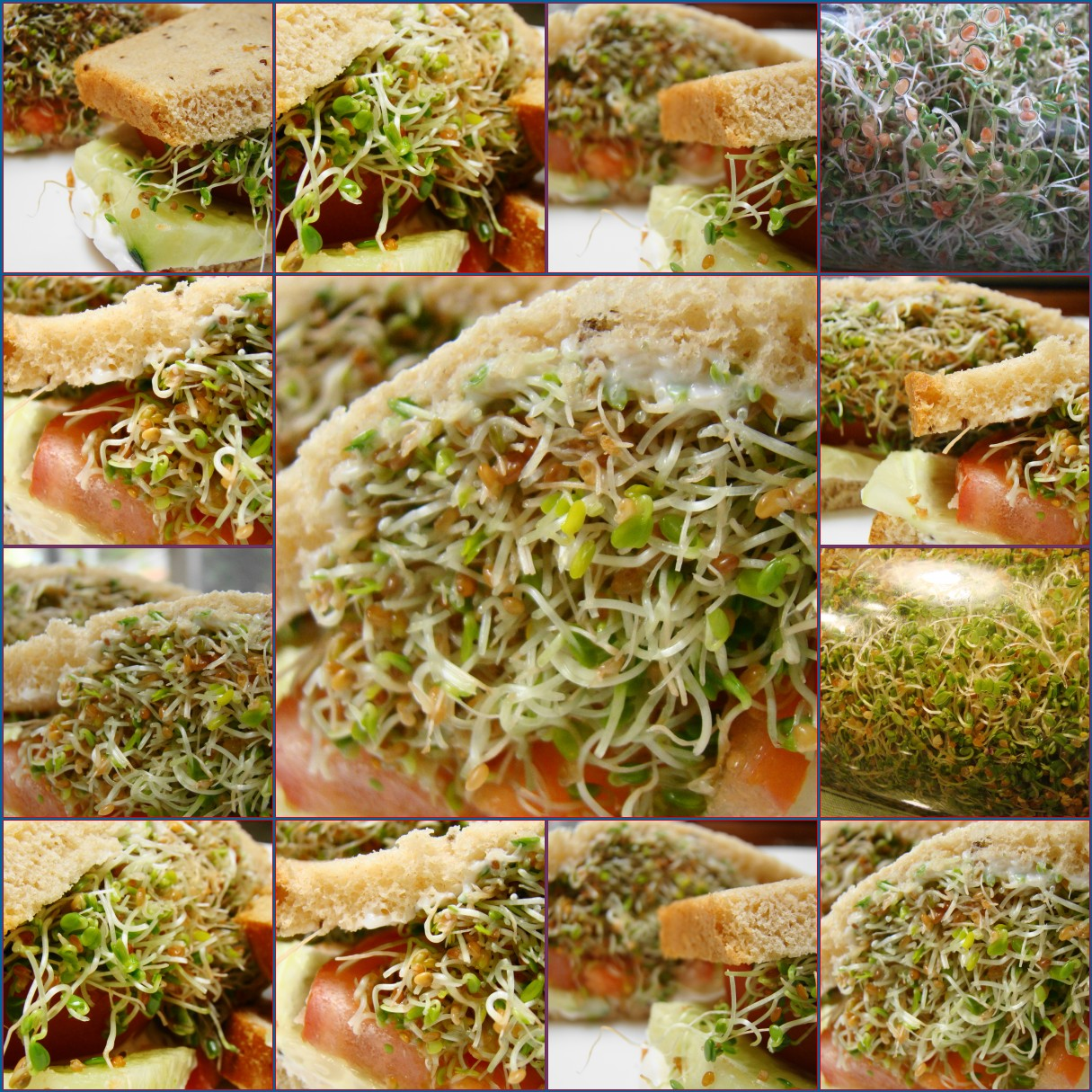
Alfalfa sprouts

=== Sprouts ===
Sprouts have extremely high nutrient content. The sprouting process doubles, and in some cases triples, the nutritional value of the plant.

44. Alfalfa sprouts Medicago sativa

45. Sprouted kidney beans Phaseolus vulgaris

46. Sprouted chickpeas Cicer arietinum

=== Tubers ===
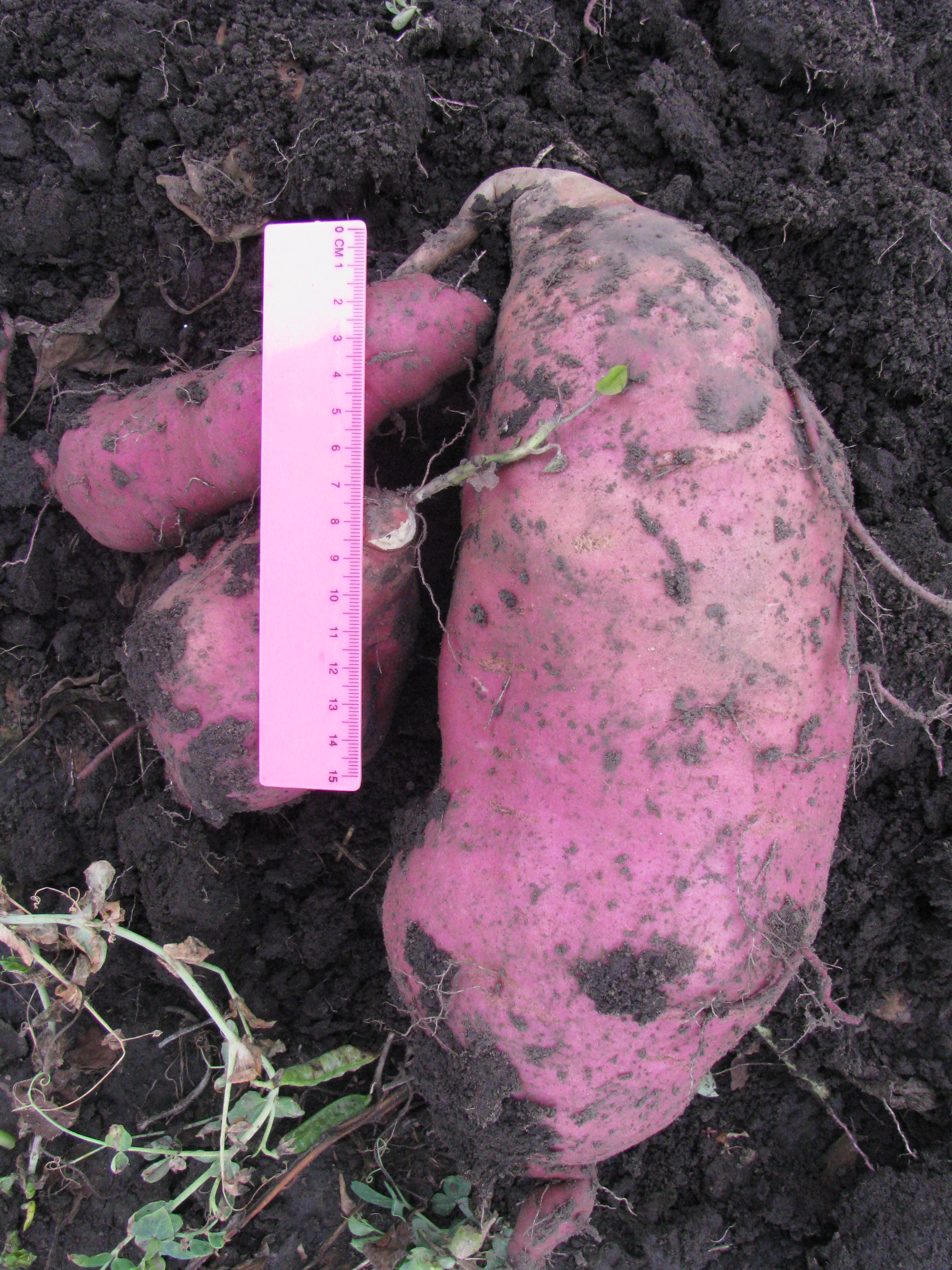
Red Indonesian sweet potato

Tubers are usually high in carbohydrates and are a source of energy.

47. Lotus root Nelumbo nucifera

48. Ube (purple yam) Dioscorea alata

49. Yam bean root (jicama) Pachyrhizus erosus

50. Red Indonesian (Cilembu) sweet potatoes Ipomoea batatas

== Reviews ==
According to Cooking Light, "This report was developed by experts in food sustainability, food security, nutrition, human rights and agriculture to help us understand how to eat for optimal health and a healthier planet." Eleanor Beardsley of NPR's Morning Edition said, "As it turns out, the way we humans eat is very much linked to preserving wildlife — and many other issues." Claiming a 60% decline in wildlife populations since 1970, David Edwards of WWF advocates addressing "the drivers of habitat loss and species collapse", identifying the biggest driver as global farming.

Global Citizen said, "Adopting a plant-based diet can help reduce your carbon footprint and decrease greenhouse gas emissions." It quoted Peter Gregory in the report: "Diversified diets not only improve human health but benefit the environment through diversified production systems that encourage wildlife and more sustainable use of resources."
