= The 1001: A Nature Trust =

Financial endowment that helps fund the World Wide Fund for Nature

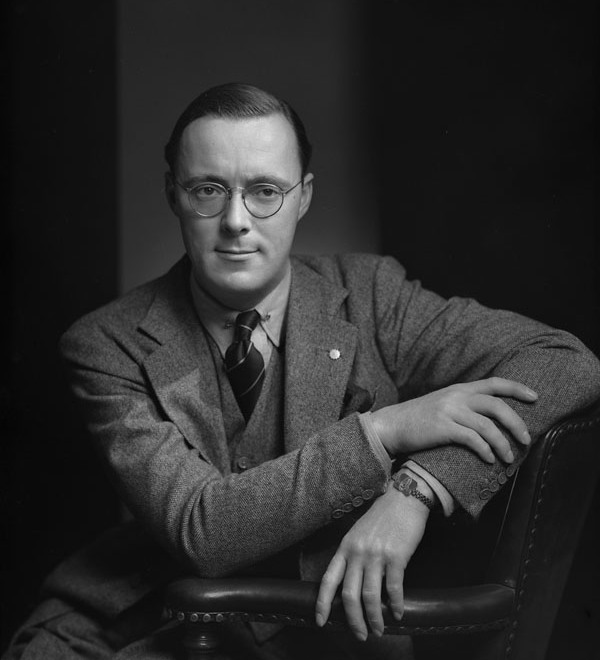
- Prince Bernhard of Lippe-Biesterfeld
- Formation: 1970
- Founder: Prince Bernhard of Lippe-Biesterfeld

The 1001: A Nature Trust, the contributors to which are sometimes referred to as the 1001 Club, is a financial endowment that helps fund the World Wide Fund for Nature. It was established in 1970 by the then-head of the WWF, Prince Bernhard of the Netherlands, with help from Anton Rupert, a South African entrepreneur.

== Foundation ==
According to the WWF, in 1970, the then- and first president of WWF International, Prince Bernhard of the Netherlands, launched an initiative that was to provide WWF with a solid financial base. WWF set up a US$10 million fund, known as "The 1001: A Nature Trust". When WWF was seeking to raise the US$10 million Anton Rupert proposed to Prince Bernhard the idea of finding a thousand individuals to make contributions of $10,000 each. Together with Rupert Prince Bernhard developed the concept of the 1001 Club in 1970 to help WWF cover its overhead costs.

The establishment of the capital fund, the interest from which enabled the WWF to cover its administrative overheads and assure potential donors “that 100 per cent of the money donated to the International Secretariat for Nature Conservation would actually be spent on nature conservation projects”, was described as Rupert’s “greatest legacy” (Alexis Schwarzenbach).

== Background ==
The WWF was founded to provide financial resources, but unlike its initial successes, it initially had only limited success. WWF co-founder Peter Scott had assumed that he would be able to raise the necessary funds and had expected “the rich” to contribute a total of 25 million US dollars. However, it was not until 1968 that the total amount of donations received by the WWF reached one million British pounds. This sum was considered too small for the diverse tasks facing the WWF. The WWF had set itself the goal of being able to spend 2.3 million British pounds annually.

In 1968, Prince Bernhard wrote in the WWF Yearbook that new sources of funding would have to be tapped to achieve this goal. Although the WWF had already established contacts with “the rich” at that point, it did not receive the hoped-for sums from them. On the one hand, the WWF believed that it should strive for financial resources that were not tied to conditions, but on the other hand, it was much easier to obtain earmarked donations for specific projects than money to cover the administrative costs of an organisation.

The WWF had struggled to raise unrestricted funds for administration, and in 1964 banker and WWF Foundation Board member Samuel Schweizer had already proposed creating a capital fund; Max Nicholson had also floated an idea for an exclusive club for wealthy supporters.

== Process ==
In January 1970, Rupert chaired the new fundraising committee and, working with Rothmans executive Charles de Haes, operationalised the plan to solicit 1,000 donors with personalised invitations from Prince Bernhard. De Haes was given broad authority for two years (while still paid by Rupert) to implement the plan.

Rupert and de Haes presented the plan to Peter Scott and Fritz Vollmar at Slimbridge. Rothmans’ designers created the club logo – a globe and the numbers 1001 embossed in gold – which was accepted by Bernhard. Club 1001 pins were manufactured by Garrard.

In November 1970 the WWF Foundation Board approved the plan, which was fully implemented by the end of 1973. Lifetime membership was granted for the one-time gift, with names kept confidential and appearing only as lists of names and countries. Members were invited to receptions at Prince Bernhard’s palace, international and national meetings, and special trips to WWF projects – the first being an East African safari in 1974. De Haes also used referrals: each new member was asked for the addresses of other potential donors. By November 1973 the target of 1,000 donors had been reached, including 60 from Germany. By the 1990s the contribution per donor had been increased to US$25,000.

De Haes was commissioned to work alongside Prince Bernhard in order to establish a permanent endowment for WWF International and reach the operations's $10 million goal.

De Haes visited all WWF country sections during the founding phase of the Club of 1001 and carried out his assignment so successfully between 1971 and 1973 that in 1975 he was appointed co-director general of WWF International alongside Fritz Vollmar and then in 1977 or 1978 sole Director General, a position he held until 1993.

== Goals and significance ==
Until the end of the 1960s, the WWF had received a relatively modest amount of donations. It was not until the 1970s – the period in which Prince Bernhard founded The 1001: A Nature Trust – that a significant increase in donations was achieved. According to the WWF, since the establishment of “The 1001”, WWF International has been able to meet its basic administrative costs with the help of the foundation.

The majority of the WWF's administrative expenses were now covered by the interest income from this and other foundations. The establishment of a permanent endowment for WWF International was intended to enable the WWF's international headquarters to be financially independent of the national sections.

The WWF itself also states that the foundation aims to “engage influential members of society in the WWF's conservation activities, those who are in a position to bring about change in the world”.

The increased focus on fundraising led to rivalries among environmental organisations. After the establishment of the African Wildlife Foundation (AWF), WWF circles perceived a threat to the WWF from rapidly growing competition for the wildlife fund market. The organisations increasingly began to target the general public for funding, especially in Europe and the USA, where prosperity was on the rise. The public was inundated with horror stories about nature and species conservation and the threats posed by humans. Images of the cruelty of poachers were widely circulated, creating a sense of urgent crisis. The strong message against hunting and resource consumption became an effective means of fundraising. From the 1970s onwards, donations from the general public began to outweigh contributions from elite organisation members. However, the messages directed at the general public did not always convey the more nuanced stance of the organisation's staff and its wealthy donors towards hunting and resource consumption. This sometimes led to conflicting strategies and abrupt U-turns by environmental organisations, such as the ban on the ivory trade in the 1980s.

The dignified image of WWF International, which was also reflected in the exclusive, upper-class membership of Club 1001, stood in stark contrast to the self-image of some national WWF organisations, such as those in Italy, the Netherlands and Switzerland, which began to become ecologically active in the 1970s.

== Composition ==
Membership of the 1001 Club is confidential. WWF refuses to give information about the members of the club. In a series of articles in the British magazine Private Eye details of some of the members were anonymously published in 1980 and 1981. A copy of the membership list of the 1001 Club for 1987 in the possession of the historian Stephen Ellis confirmed many of the published allegations. Names of the members "that have slipped out over the years include Baron von Thyssen, Fiat boss Gianni Agnelli, and Henry Ford, as well as politicians such as Mobutu Sese Seko of Zaire, the former president of the International Olympic Committee Juan Samaranch, and beer baron Alfred Heineken".

The British journalist Kevin Dowling — who made a documentary on ivory poaching that had the support of WWF but who later fell out with the organisation over Operation Lock — discovered two lists, one for 1978 and one for 1987 which suggest that some cross-fertilisation between the various networks in which Prince Bernhard was involved took place and contributed to finding suitable candidates for the 1001 Club.

Although confidential, membership lists were printed annually and circulated among members; copies can be found in some personal archives (e.g. Peter Scott) or as scans online.

New donors can join only as seats open.

According to Alexis Schwarzenbach, members came from over 50 countries. In 1978 the top five were the USA (177), UK (157), the Netherlands (107), South Africa (65), and Switzerland (62).

Many of the 1001 Club members were from the banking sector, other business sectors, intelligence, and the military, or were heads of state. A number of the 1001 Club members were part of the South African business sector, which was the subject of international sanctions during apartheid. Therefore, particular linkages existed between parts of the global elite network and wildlife conservation through the presidency of Prince Bernhard of WWF International as well as explicit links of WWF International to South Africa in the field of environmental philanthropy.

Selection of members of ‘The 1001’ according to the confidential membership lists from 1978 and 1987 from the estate of Kevin Dowling.
Name	note	Origin or residence
Agha Hasan Abedi	President of the BCCI Bank	Pakistan
Karim Aga Khan IV. (Prince Aga Khan IV.)	Billionaire and spiritual Muslim leader	Pakistan, United Kingdom, ...
Giovanni Agnelli	CEO of Fiat	Italy
Baron Astor of Hever	President of The Times	United Kingdom
Stephen Bechtel	Bechtel Group	USA
Berthold Beitz	Krupp	Germany
Martine Cartier-Bresson		France
Charles de Chambrun	Leading member of the Front National	France
Joseph Cullman III	CEO Philip Morris	USA
Sir Eric Drake	Director General of British Petroleum	United Kingdom
Prinz Philip, Herzog von Edinburgh	From 1961 President of WWF-UK, 1981–1996 President of WWF International	United Kingdom
Friedrich Karl Flick	Industrialist and billionaire	Germany, Austria
Henry Ford II		USA
Manuel Fraga Iribarne	Minister under Franco, founder of the right-wing Alianza Popular	Spain
C. Gerald Goldsmith		USA
Ferdinand H. M. Grapperhaus	Dutch Minister of Finance	Netherlands
Alfred Heineken	Known as the “Beer King”	Netherlands
Lukas Hoffmann	Hoffmann-La Roche	Switzerland
Lord John King	British Airways	United Kingdom
Sheikh Salim Bin Ladin	Elder brother of Osama bin Laden	Saudi Arabia
John H. Loudon	CEO of Shell, from 1976 to 1981 President of WWF International	Netherlands
Daniel K. Ludwig	Shipowner and billionaire	USA
José Martínez de Hoz	Oligarch, Minister of Economic Affairs during the military dictatorship of Jorge Rafael Videla	Argentina
Robert McNamara	US Secretary of Defense during the Vietnam era	USA
Keshub Mahindra	Mahindra Group	India
Mobutu Sese Seko	Long-time dictator of Zaire	Zaire
Mærsk Mc-Kinney Møller	Shipping magnate	Denmark
Prince Bernhard of Netherlands	1962–1976 President of WWF International, remained deeply involved in WWF and its activities thereafter	Netherlands
Queen Juliana of Netherlands	Wife of Prince Bernhard	Netherlands
Harry Frederick Oppenheimer	Anglo American Corporation	South Africa
David Rockefeller	Chase Manhattan Bank	USA
Tibor Rosenbaum	BCI, Geneva	Switzerland
Baron Edmond von Rothschild		France
Juan Antonio Samaranch	IOC President	Spain
Peter von Siemens	Siemens	Germany
Hans Heinrich Thyssen-Bornemisza		Switzerland
Joachim Zahn	Daimler-Benz	Germany

== Current members ==
According to a recent report by the WWF (as of 2014), the anonymous members of The 1001: A Nature Trust are a “prestigious group of people” consisting of “philanthropists from over 50 countries”. According to the WWF, they include “owners and managers of large companies, entrepreneurs, scientists and artists” who, regardless of “their political, personal and business interests” – “all share the same passion for the environment – and, above all, the same need to support the world's leading conservation organisation”. In addition to individuals, “entire families” also come together in the club.

== Criticisms ==
In his book At the Hand of Man: Peril and Hope for Africa's Wildlife Raymond Bonner criticized the WWF on charges of neocolonialist methods. In her review of his book, Ann O'Hanlon of the Washington Monthly, who called Bonner's charges a "thorough indictment of WWF", wrote: "The secret list of members includes a disproportionate percentage of South Africans, all too happy in an era of social banishment to be welcomed into a socially elite society. Other contributors include businessmen with suspect connections, including organized crime, environmentally destructive development, and corrupt African politics. Even an internal report called WWF's approach egocentric and neocolonialist. (The report was largely covered up.)"

According to Stephen Ellis, who sought to demonstrate the influence of the white South Africa lobby in the financing of WWF International, most known members of the 1001 Club were "people of irreproachable integrity, although members of the 1001 Club include a small number of disreputable individuals such as President Mobutu Sese Seko of Zaire and Agha Hasan Abedi, former president of the Bank of Credit and Commerce International, responsible for the biggest fraud in world financial history." Both Mobutu and Abedi were members of the 1001 Club known for the year 1987 at least. Ellis and Gerrie ter Haar (2004) described the WWF's 1001 Club as "an association where European royalty rubs shoulders with leading industrials but also with some distinctly dubious figures from the worlds of grand corruption and secret intelligence". According to them the ostensibly non-political body WWF gave access to elite connections of a type, that means that "membership of elite international networks and societies" enabled African leaders "to link global elites in a discretion they find congenial" as witnessed by President Mobutu's 1001 Club membership. In this context Ellis and ter Haar regard as key attraction of secret societies that "membership provides opportunities for doing political deals unobserved by the mass of the population and for forming bonds of solidarity that go beyond the ordinary" and state that "secrecy binds people together".

Ellis also stressed, that "the identities of the 1,001 members of the 1001 Club reflect quite closely Bernhard's own circle of acquaintances". According to Ellis they also revealed "the influence of leading South African personalities". The available 1987 membership list included at least 60 South Africans including prominent members of the Afrikaner Broederbond, who were at the top of companies which had depended on the patronage of the Broederbond, such as Johannes Hurter (chairman of Volkskas), Etienne Rousseau (chairman of the Federale mining and industrial group), and Pepler Scholtz (former managing director of the Sanlam financial group). The 1001 Club was particularly popular with South African business executives during apartheid, allowing them to network and do business internationally while bypassing international sanctions. At least three South African 1001 Club members had been implicated in the Muldergate Scandal in South Africa, wherein it was revealed that the Pretoria government had used secret service funds to buy control of newspapers. One of them, Louis Luyt, who played a prominent part in the scandal, was a former business partner of Anton Rupert.

After Private Eye’s 1980 “Lowlife Fund” article, internal WWF discussions noted concerns that corporate donors from ecologically sensitive sectors and controversial political figures appeared on confidential lists. In 1982, a top WWF body ultimately concluded—when weighing whether to screen donors for environmental responsibility—that “no church has ever refused donations from sinners,” while acknowledging the risk companies might try to buy respectability without changing behaviour.

== Operation Lock ==
Prince Bernhard remained closely associated with WWF International after his presidency and was linked to the covert anti-poaching initiative known as Operation Lock, implemented from 1987 by the London-based private security firm KAS Enterprises founded by SAS creator David Stirling. Former SAS personnel trained anti-poaching units in Namibia and Mozambique and also ran a clandestine effort to infiltrate ivory and rhino-horn trafficking networks in South Africa.

Journalistic investigations and internal reviews later reported that South African intelligence infiltrated the operation and that some operatives became entangled in anti-ANC activities aligned with the apartheid state’s broader destabilisation strategy.

According to the Sofaer chronology, Hanks and Prince Bernhard agreed the KAS project would be financed by Bernhard on condition that WWF was not involved.

According to internal accounts, funds related to Operation Lock flowed in unusual ways. Two paintings from Prince Bernhard’s collection were auctioned at Sotheby’s in December 1988 for £610,000 and donated to WWF International; shortly thereafter, £500,000 from the 1001 Club’s account was transferred to Queen Juliana’s Dutch account and used for Operation Lock, with WWF retaining the remaining £110,000.

When the operation came to light, WWF leadership sought to place responsibility on John Hanks, then head of the Africa programme. Hanks later helped establish the Peace Parks Foundation (PPF) at Anton Rupert’s request in 1997. A mid-1990s inquiry led by Judge Mark Kumleben for President Nelson Mandela examined WWF-related activities in the apartheid era and described a dense web of intelligence and economic interests in which conservation sometimes served as cover.

== Conspiracy theories ==
The 1001 Club has given rise to various "conspiracy theories" in books and internet forums, possibly promoted by the lack of publicly available membership lists and information about the 1001 Club's meetings. Ramutsindela et al. (2011) emphasize in this context, that "one of the biggest dangers in writing about the type of elite networks and initiatives is that readers may accuse the authors of creating, participating or contributing to conspiracy theories".
