= Protected Harvest =

American non-profit organization

- Protected Harvest Label
- Founded: 2001
- Founder: Jeff Dlott, PhD
- Type: Non-Profit
- Purpose: Sustainable Agriculture
- Location: Soquel, California
- Products: Product Certification
- Website: protectedharvest.org

Protected Harvest is an American non-profit organization headquartered in Soquel, California that certifies sustainably grown crops. The goal of the organization is to provide a standard measurement of what constitutes a sustainable product and use it to assure retailers and consumers that they are pucharsing sustainably grown items. Protected Harvest was founded in 2001 as an independent non-profit organization and merged into SureHarvest in 2008. According to EcoLabeling.org, a non-profit monitoring certification programs, "Protected Harvest is an eco-label with the stated mission of helping farmers meet environmental standards that yield high quality products and preserve healthy land for future generations." Pest-management in particular is among the specialties of Protected Harvest, according to Consumer Reports.

== Activities ==
The Protected Harvest program provides technical support and collaborates with qualified organizations to develop region and crop–specific verifiable environmental performance standards, which are peer reviewed before being presented to its Oversight Board for adoption. The public availability of the standards and methodology is part of the Protected Harvest commitment to transparency.

Upon certification through on-site verification, growers may use the Protected Harvest eco-label in marketing their certified foods. The first Protected Harvest certified crop to hit the shelves was Healthy Grown potatoes from Wisconsin. Additionally, Protected Harvest certifies winegrapes from the Lodi Rules for Sustainable Winegrowing program of the Lodi Woodbridge Winegrape Commission in Lodi, California, fresh and fresh-cut mushrooms from the Modern Mushroom company, and stonefruit sold under the Zeal and Ripe 'N Ready brands.

=== Board of directors ===
According to the Protected Harvest web-site:

The Protected Harvest Board of directors is a collaboration of representatives of prominent environmental organizations, agricultural specialists, scientists, and marketing experts. The Board’s responsibility is to review and approve all standards as grounded in environmental science and practical for on-farm implementation.

Currently the Protected Harvest oversight board, charged with the task of developing the measurements for what constitutes sustainably grown product consists of the following:

- Suzy Friedman, Center for Conservation Incentives, Environmental Defense Fund
- Will Horwath, PhD (Council President), Professor, Land, Air and Water Resources, University of California, Davis
- Jonathan Kaplan, Director, Agriculture Project, Natural Resources Defense Council
- Deana Knutson, PhD, Biointensive IPM Coordinator, WWF/WPVGA/UW Collaboration
- Charles Mellinger, PhD, Technical Director, Glades Crop Care, Inc.
- Cliff Ohmart, PhD, Vice President of Professional Services, SureHarvest
- Kai Robertson, Independent Sustainability Expert
- Ann Sorenson, Assistant Vice President of Research, American Farmland Trust

== Advantages ==
The certification approach is said by Protected Harvest literature to have great environmental value in that it helps to solve a major intractable problem: nonpoint source pollution caused by agricultural runoff of pesticides and fertilizer components such as nitrogen and phosphorus. Certain pesticides and fertilizers provide cheap insurance to farmers that they will have large yields. Third-party certification is designed to provide assurance to consumers that growers are in fact utilizing practices which reduce these problems.

Each Protected Harvest production standard is written to reflect the unique growing requirements and environmental considerations of the crop and the specific bioregion in which it is grown. A “typical” standard is divided into four major sections: whole farm management, soil and water management, and air quality management.

Depending on the crop, the region where it is grown, and the exact production system being addressed, the relative importance of the factors will change. When developing a standard for certification purposes, the point system is ultimately determined by a multidisciplinary Crop Advisory Committee that is assembled for the writing of each crop certification standard. A peer review of the standard is then conducted to evaluate the technical competency of the standard, followed by a review by the Protected Harvest Oversight Board.
