= Claudia Bernadine Elisabeth Hartert =

German-British ornithologist (1863–1958)

- Born: Claudia Endris; 21 June 1863; Coesfeld, Kingdom of Prussia
- Died: 24 August 1958 (aged 95); Hilversum, Netherlands
- Occupations: Ornithologist, illustrator
- Spouse: Ernst Hartert (m. July 1891)
- Children: Joachim Karl Hartert (1893–1916)
- Parents: Lieutenant Colonel Joachim Endris (father); Alwine Florentine Sophie Böcker (mother)

Claudia Bernadine Elisabeth Hartert (21 June 1863 – 24 August 1958) was a British/German ornithologist and illustrator. She was a British citizen born in the Kingdom of Prussia.

== Biography ==
Born Claudia Endris (or Endriss) (21 June 1863 in Coesfeld, Germany), Claudia's father was Lieutenant Colonel Joachim Endris, her mother's name was Alwine Florentine Sophie, née Böcker. Claudia's older brother was Gustav Joachim (born 1862).

In July 1891, Claudia married the ornithologist Ernst Hartert in Frankfurt am Main, Germany. They had a son named Joachim Karl Hartert (1893–1916), who was killed as an English soldier during the Battle of the Somme in France.

=== Work ===
On 4 May 1892 Claudia Hartert and her husband left Le Havre, France, for an extended trip to the West Indies in the Caribbean Sea. On 19 May they reached the island of Saint Thomas, where Claudia saw her first hummingbird, a blue star Antilles.

Together with her husband she was the first to describe the blue-tailed Buffon hummingbird subspecies (Chalybura buffonii intermedia E. Hartert & C. Hartert, 1894). The article "On a collection of Humming Birds from Ecuador and Mexico" appears to be their only joint publication. In The Feathered World (Die Gefiederte Welt) she published many observations and illustrations from her trip to the West Indies.

In October 1882, the Hartert couple moved to Tring, England, to work with Walter Rothschild, 2nd Baron Rothschild. Ernst became the director of the Natural History Museum at Tring, which at the time was privately owned by Rothschild. Claudia managed the museum's library for at least a few years. The couple lived a normal life there despite their dual allegiances to Germany and England until the beginnings of World War I. While in Tring, Claudia's husband became a naturalized English citizen, according to an excerpt of a May 1915 letter from Claudia Hartert in Tring to Mrs. Noerdlinger, wife of Eugene Robert Noerdlinger, "German suspect, resident in Jersey".

We have now been 24 years in England. How English people have gone down in my esteem. I am too much of a German to be able to think otherwise. My young son was at Oxford when he had to become a soldier, thank God he is still in our neighborhood. ... My husband it is true has been naturalized for 13 years, or more, but is not a born native.

=== Illustrations ===
Claudia Hartert was acknowledged as an excellent illustrator, and provided 493 illustrations that appeared in A Practical Handbook of British Birds. Her figures went without attribution in the first edition that was printed before World War I. In the preface to the second volume Harry Forbes Witherby wrote:

I have also to acknowledge my gratitude to Mrs. Hartert for the care and trouble she has taken over the text figures, almost all of which have been drawn by her from specimens in the Tring Museum.

Some of the drawings also appear in the five-volume Handbook of British Birds, that Witherby published in 1952.

=== Later years ===
Claudia Hartert retained her English citizenship after moving to Berlin in 1930. Her husband died there in 1933.

In 1939, due to political difficulties, and with the help of British ornithologist Phyllis Barclay-Smith, she moved from Berlin to the St. Willebrordus nursing home in Wassenaar, Netherlands. On 21 August 1940, Hartert moved to the St. Carolus nursing home in Hilversum, Netherlands, where she lived until her death 24 August 1958, at 95 years of age.

== Dedication names ==
- In 1922 John David Digues La Touche named Claudia's leaf warbler (Phylloscopus claudiae (La Touche, 1922)) after Mrs. Hartert.
- Heliangelus claudia E. Hartert, 1895 is today considered a synonym for the Longuemare's sunangel (Heliangelus clarisse (Longuemare, 1841)).
- The genus Claudia E. Hartert, 1896 is today a synonym for Tachornis Gosse, 1847. (Hartert himself corrected the name in 1916 after advice from Charles Chubb (1851–1924) and Tom Iredale (1880–1972) with Reinarda, because the name Claudia Stål, 1865 had already been assigned.)

== Selected publications ==
- Hartert, Ernst & Hartert, Claudia (1894). "On a collection of Humming Birds from Ecuador and Mexico". Novitates Zoologicae. 1: 43-64.
- Illustration in: The Feathered World. (23 February 1893). 12 (8): 71-72.
- The same illustration appeared in: The Feathered World. (2 March 1893). 12 (9): 81-82.
- The same illustration appeared in: The Feathered World. (9 March 1893). 12 (10): 91-95.
- Hartert, Claudia B. E. (1900). Pen and Ink Drawings of Palearctic Birds.
