= Otto Kleinschmidt =

German ornithologist, theologist and pastor

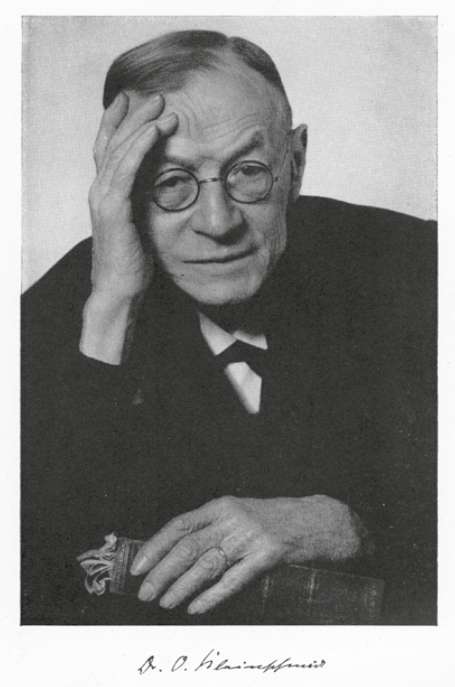
c. 1950

Otto Kleinschmidt (13 December 1870 – 25 March 1954) was a German ornithologist, theologist and pastor. He was also an artist and taxidermist who produced specimens and illustrations of birds for his writings. He was critical of Darwinian ideas on evolution and natural selection and developed a kind of creationist superspecies concept called Formenkreis which involved variation with geographic dispersal that he illustrated with what he called "geogramms". He edited a periodical Falco (1905 to 1945) which was a companion to a monograph series called Berajah (until 1937). After speculating on the variations of birds he also examined human variation and gave theories that have been interpreted variously as a form of scientific racism.

== Life and career ==
Kleinschmidt was the son of a potato processing factory overseer Adolph Kleinschmidt and his wife Elise (maiden name Dreydorff) in Geinsheim (Kornsand) on the Rhine. The house of the family was located miles from anywhere in between unspoiled countryside. Otto Kleinschmidt was already as a young boy highly interested in nature and the world of the birds. At the age of eight he prepared his first taxidermied specimens. Besides that it was kind of a family tradition to research and collect. He studied in Oppenheim, and from 1885 at Mainz. He then studied theology at Marburg and Berlin while also attending a few zoology lectures. He was involved in the rediscovery and rescue of Christian Ludwig Brehm's bird collections (nearly 10,000 specimens) in 1895-97. He was ordained as a Protestant pastor in 1899 at Marburg. During this period he worked on the bird collections held by Hans von Berlepsch near Witzenhausen. In 1927 he became a parish priest at Wittenberg. In 1926 he was inducted into the Leopoldina Academy. He began a popular science series called the new Brehm library writing a volume on the hummingbirds and editing a few others until his death.

Kleinschmidt married Clara Krebel (1875-1957) who worked as a nanny at the Berlepsch Castle, in 1898. They moved to Mansfeld when he became a pastor in Volkmaritz near Eisleben. In 1910 he moved to Dederstedt. In 1927 he became director of the church research centre in Lutherstadt Wittenberg where he worked on a unification of religion and natural science. He sold off his bird collections to the Alexander Koenig Museum in 1935. He wrote several books which were illustrated with his drawings (his children helped with coloring the lithographs).

=== Ornithology and systematics ===
While in Marburg he met Ernst Hartert who had a major impact on his ornithological work. The Rhenish painter De Maes influenced his art. He made a collecting trip to Herzegovina and Bosnia in 1893 and wrote a study on the variation of Garrulus glandarius. He noted that the grey tit of central Europe was made up of two forms the marsh tit (Poecile palustris) and the willow tit (Poecile montanus) which lived side by side without hybridizing. This and other twin species would inform his view on evolution. He introduced a typological species concept into German ornithology. His Formenkreis theory influenced the early ideas of Erwin Stresemann. He edited a periodical series called Falco from 1905 to 1945 which included the contributions of others. At the same time he produced a monograph series titled Berajah:Zoographia infinita in which he wrote about his own ideas. The name Berajah was derived from Hebrew "bara Jahwe" meaning "God created him". Others have considered him one of the first biogeographers. His position was that similar "forms" (species) found in geographically distant regions could be accounted for by "formation rings" – with a fixed set of characters. This allowed him to support creationism while explaining biogeographical similarities.

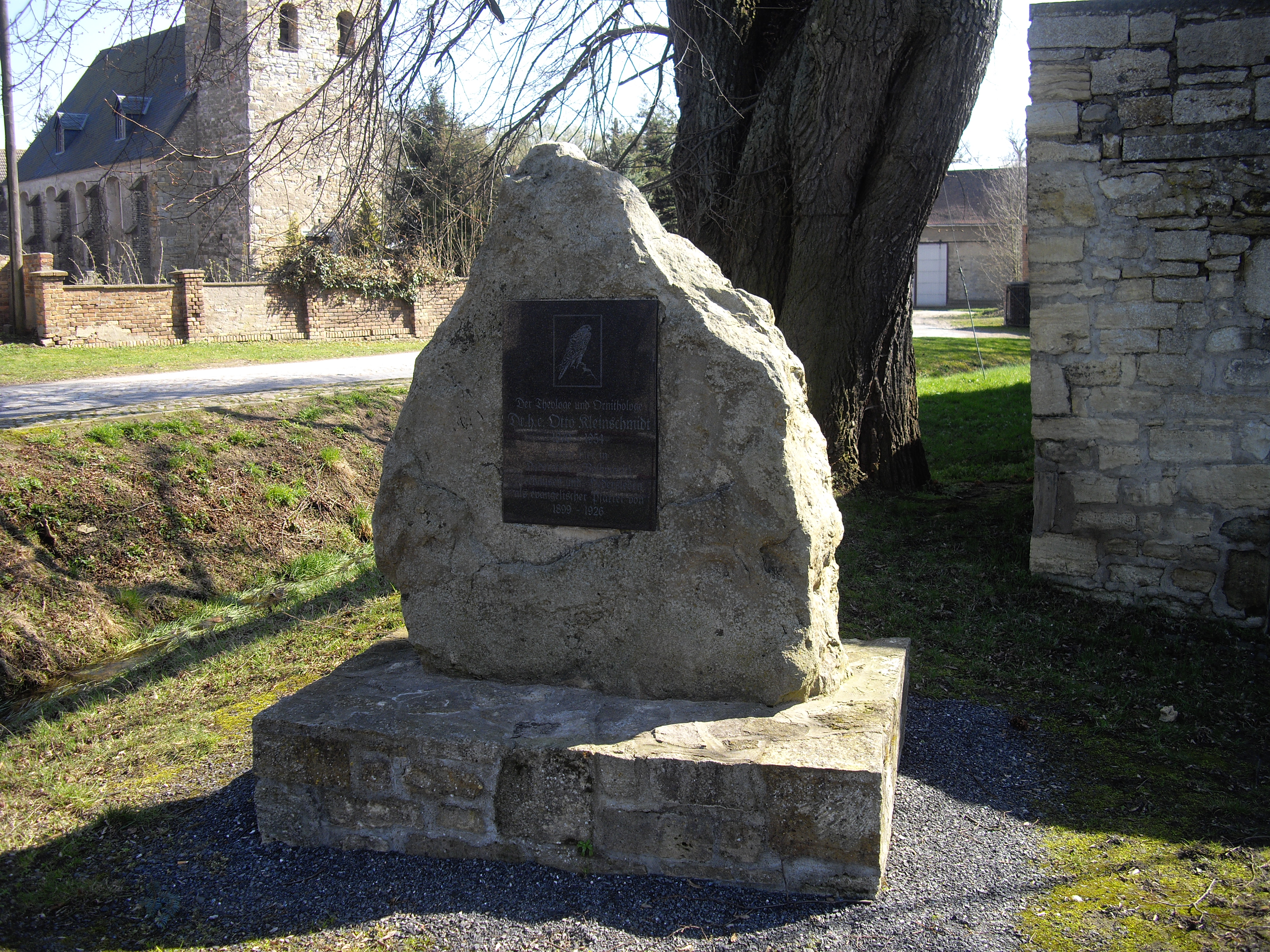
Memorial at Dederstedt

Kleinschmidt's book The Formenkreis Theory and the Progress of the Organic World was translated in 1930 by Francis Charles Robert Jourdain. Mixed reviews appeared in American and British journals. Bernhard Rensch developed some aspects of the Formenkreis theory using the term "racial circles" but he was critical of Kleinschmidt's anti-evolutionist stance.

Historians of science Georgy S. Levit, Kay Meister and Uwe Hoßfeld have noted that:

Kleinschmidt’s creationistic concept led him not only to the rejection of the Darwinian theory of descent, but also to the negation of the post-Mendelian genetics. His criticism of the Darwinian principles is one of the most intensive and extensive assaults on the proper evolutionism. At the same time, his studies on individual and geographic variation of Palaearctic birds delivered valuable biological data, which seriously contributed to the empirical basis of biological systematics.

Some authors like Beleites claim that Kleinschmidt was an advocate of the idea of evolution and that he was chiefly critical of the idea that all biodiversity arose from one species as well as the idea of the theory of selection. Kleinschmidt proposed that there was a law of variation which kept forms in the wild within a narrow limit to the variation. He claimed that large variations or "aberrations" arose in captivity and through domestication.

Professor of biology Eugene Potapov argues that despite Kleinschmidt's writings being obscure and rarely cited today, he nevertheless "outlined the modern genetic approach to the understanding of the systematics of large falcons."

Kleinschmidt worked on a book on songbirds (1921) after being encouraged Otto Schmeil (1860-1943), the author of several popular German textbooks.

=== Anthropology and human evolution ===
Kleinschmidt developed ideas on human evolution and human races during the late 1920s and early 1930s which caught the attention of the ruling National Socialist party. For his anthropological work he received an honorary doctorate from the University of Halle-Wittenberg in 1923. His teachings and writings are however complicated and his relationship with the Nazi party was complex. The party took an interested in his early work and his expressions were that of a conservative German nationalist but the party later became extremely critical of his views. He did not become a party member.

== Published works ==
- Kleinschmidt O. 1897. [No title]. Journal für Ornithologie 45: 518–519.
- Kleinschmidt, O. (1900) Arten oder Formenkreise? Journal für Ornithologie 48:134–139
- Kleinschmidt, O. 1921. Die Singvögel der Heimat. Verlag von Quelle & Meyer, Leipzig.
- Kleinschmidt O. 1926. Der weitere Ausbau der Formenkreislehre. Journal für Ornithologie 74: 405–408.
- Kleinschmidt O. 1930. The Formenkreis Theory and the Progress of the Organic World: A Re-Casting of the Theory of Descent and Race-Study to Prepare the Way for a Harmonious Conception of the Universal Reality. London, H.F. & G. Witherby. (translated by Francis Charles Robert Jourdain)
- Kleinschmidt O. 1933 Kurzgefaßte deutsche Rassenkunde. Armanen-Verlag, Leipzig.
- Kleinschmidt O. 1933. Blut und Rasse. Die Stellung des evangelischen Christen zu den Forderungen der Eugenik. Unter Zugrundelegung eines am 18. April 1933 auf der zweiten Konferenz evangelischer Akademiker in Hannover gehaltenen Vortrags. Verlag Martin Warneck, Berlin.
- Kleinschmidt O. 1934–2000. Die Raubvögel der Heimat. Klassiker der Ornithologie. Aula-Verlag GmbH & Co. Wiebelsheim Die Raubvögel der Heimat – Predator Birds of the Homeland
- Kleinschmidt O. 1949. Die Kolibris.
- Kleinschmidt O. 1950. Der Zauber von Brehms Tierleben. (Neue Brehm-Bücherei) Geest&Portig. Lpzg. A.Ziemsen Vlg. Wittenberg/Lutherstadt.
- Kleinschmidt A. 1950. Leben und Werk. Syllegomena Biologica. Festschrift zum 80. Geburtstage von Herrn Pastor Dr. Med. H.C. O. Kleinschmidt, Lutherstadt Wittenberg am 13. Dezember 1950 eds, A. von Jordans & F. Peus pp. 1–31. Leipzig: Wittenberg.

== Other sources ==
- Clancey PA. 1950. Some appreciative remarks on the work of Dr Otto Kleinschmidt by a British avian taxonomist. Syllegomena Biologica. Festschrift zum 80. Geburtstage von Herrn Pastor Dr. Med. H.C.O. Kleinschmidt, Lutherstadt Wittenberg am 13. Dezember 1950 eds, A. von Jordans & F. Peus, pp. 31–34. Leipzig: Wittenberg.
