= Norman Frederic Ticehurst =

Norman Frederic Ticehurst OBE (1 July 1873 – 5 December 1969) was an English surgeon and ornithologist. He was involved in documenting the birds of Kent and of the British Isles in collaboration with others like Ernst Hartert, F. C. R. Jourdain and H. F. Witherby.

Ticehurst was born at St. Leonards-on-Sea, Sussex, and was the brother of Claud Buchanan Ticehurst. He went to Tonbridge School where he excelled in shooting and fencing. He once took part in a fencing match with his opponent from Harrow being Winston Churchill. He graduated from Clare College, Cambridge with MB in 1903. He joined the East Sussex Hospital in 1904. He was made an OBE in 1920. The hospital later became the Royal East Sussex Hospital and he served there well after his retirement was due in 1933. The outbreak of the Second World War led to his tenure being extended for five years. He began to edit along with H. F. Witherby reports on new British birds and rarities. He was a co-editor of the periodical British Birds at the time of its founding to 1959. He published books on the birds of Kent in 1909 and a history of the mute swan in 1957. He also took an interest in carpentry which may also have had applications for his practice in orthopaedics.
