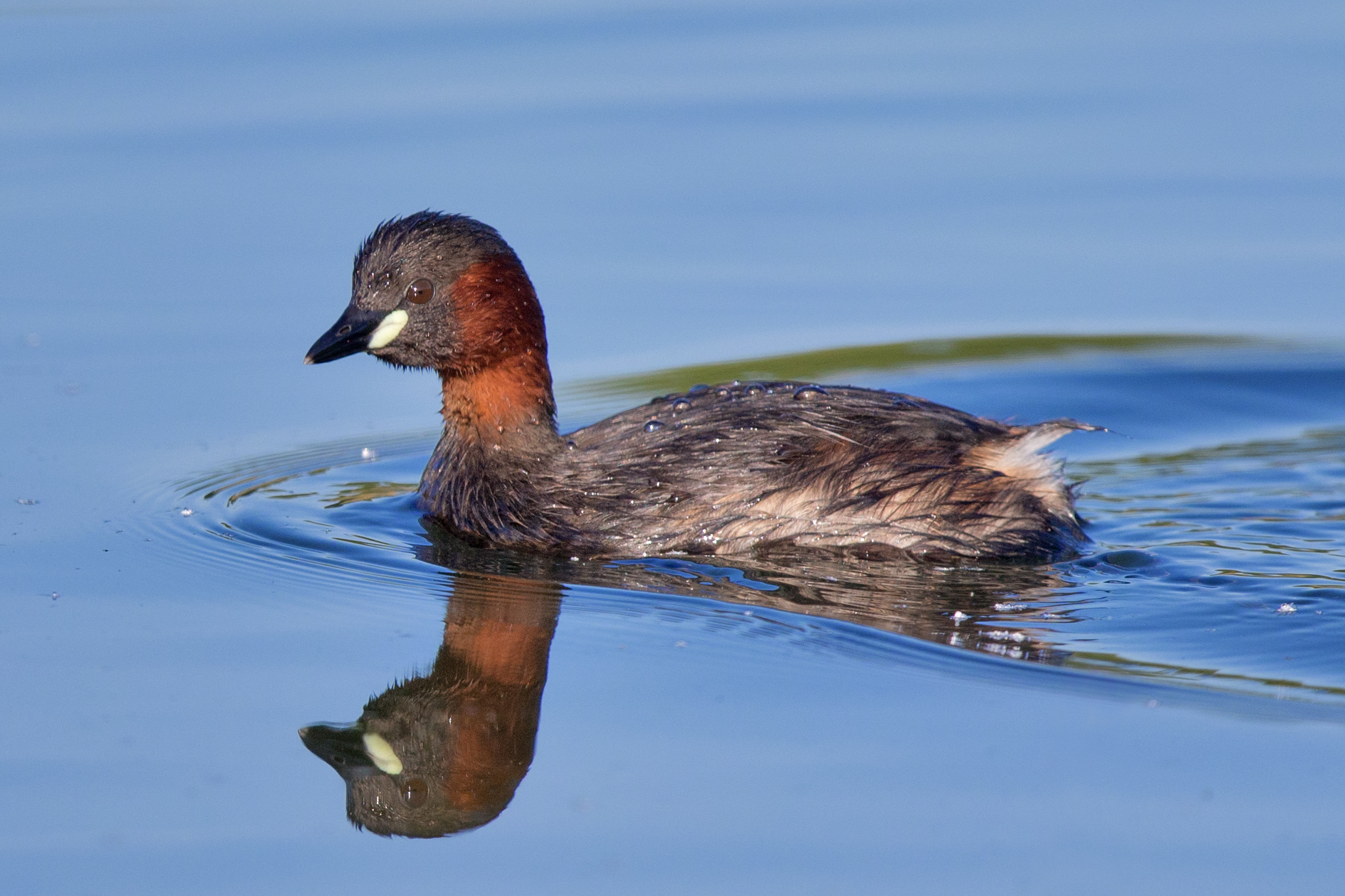

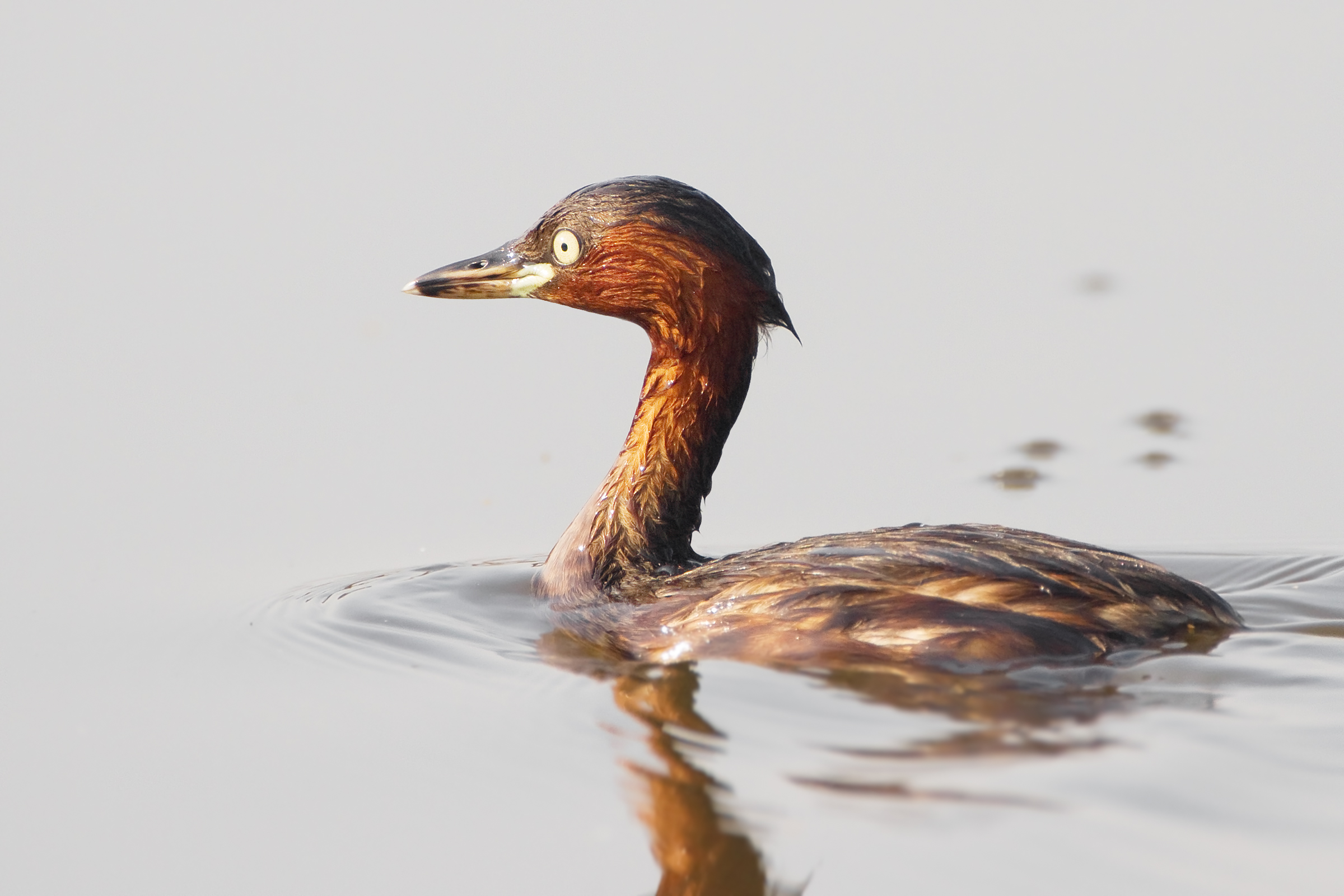
- Two adults in breeding plumage, below with feathers pressed against the body, for low buoyancy

Conservation status
- Least Concern (IUCN 3.1)

Scientific classification
- Kingdom: Animalia
- Phylum: Chordata
- Class: Aves
- Order: Podicipediformes
- Family: Podicipedidae
- Genus: Tachybaptus
- Species: T. ruficollis

Binomial name
- Tachybaptus ruficollis (Pallas, 1764)
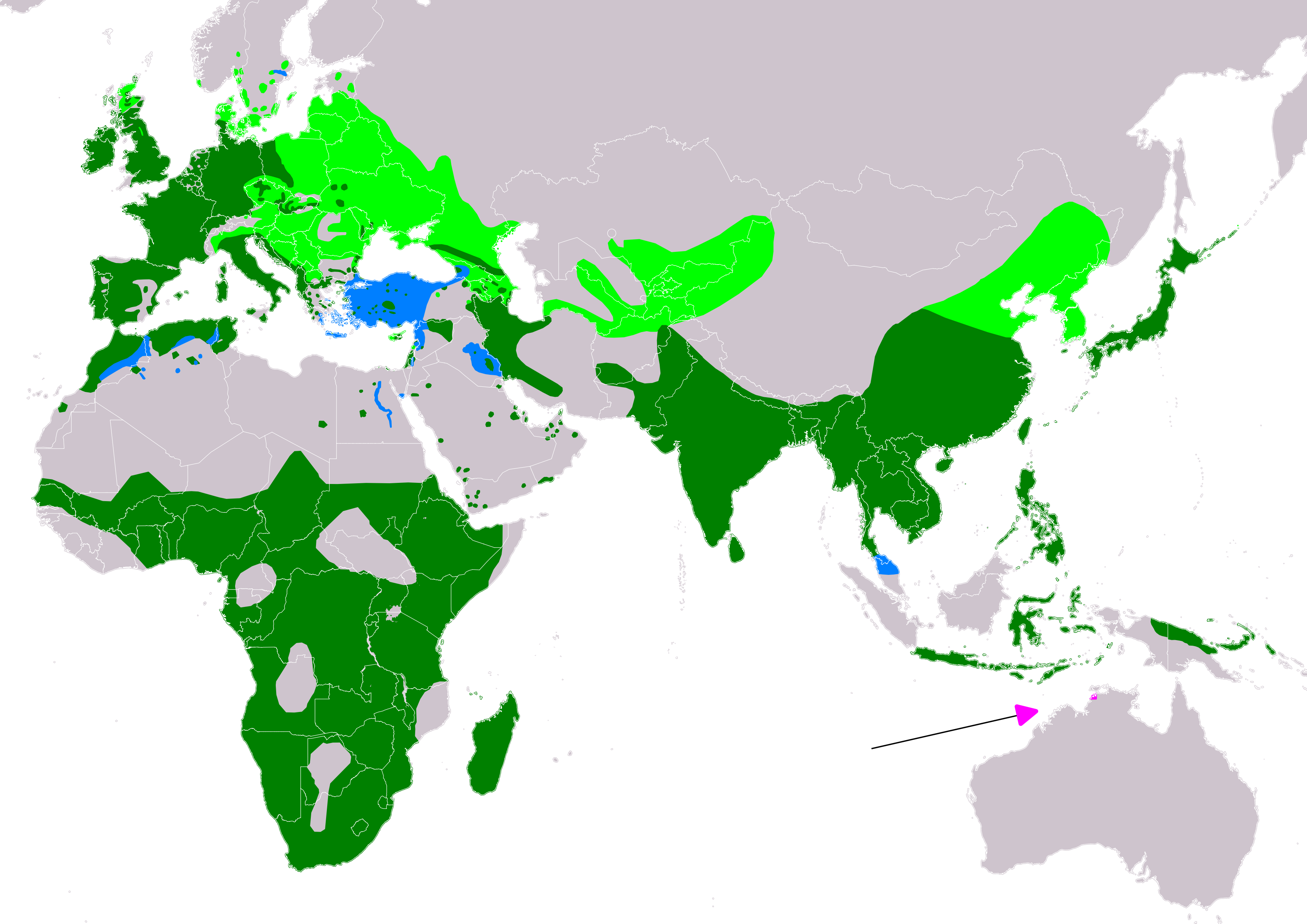
- Breeding Year-round Non-breeding Vagrant (seasonality uncertain)

Synonyms
- Podiceps ruficollis

= Little grebe =

Species of bird

The little grebe (Tachybaptus ruficollis), also known as the dabchick, is a member of the grebe family of water birds. The genus name is from Ancient Greek takhus "fast" and bapto "to sink under". The specific ruficollis is from Latin rufus "red" and Modern Latin -collis, "-necked", itself derived from Latin collum "neck".

At 23 to 29 centimetres (9 to 11 1/2 inches) in length it is the smallest European, Asian, and African member of its family. It is commonly found in open bodies of water across most of its range.

== Taxonomy ==
The little grebe was formally described in a sales catalogue by the German naturalist Peter Simon Pallas in 1764 under the binomial name Colymbus ruficollis. The type locality is the Netherlands. The specific epithet is Modern Latin meaning "red-necked", from Latin rufus meaning "red", "ruddy" or "rufous" and Modern Latin -collis meaning "-necked". The little grebe is now one of five species placed in the genus Tachybaptus that was introduced in 1789 by German naturalist Johann Friedrich Gmelin.

=== Subspecies ===
Ten subspecies are currently accepted, four widespread, and six with restricted ranges; they are separated principally by size, eye colour, which varies from dark to light from west to east, to red in the southeast, and extent of white on the secondary feathers of the wing, which varies from none in temperate northern regions, to extensive white in tropical regions.

Summer	Winter	Scientific name	Distribution	Notes (flank colour refers to breeding plumage)
Brussels, Belgium	Lac de Tunis, Tunisia	T. r. ruficollis Pallas, 1764	nominate, Europe to western Asia, south to northern Africa; northeast European birds migratory, others resident.	Eye dark brown; flanks brown; secondaries with no or minimal white.
Bharatpur, Rajasthan, India	Coimbatore, Tamil Nadu, India	T. r. albescens (Blanford, 1877)	Southern and central Asia from Turkmenistan to southern Kazakhstan, south to Sri Lanka, and east through Pakistan, India, Nepal, Bhutan and Bangladesh to Myanmar; central Asian birds migratory, south Asian birds resident.	Eye orange to yellow; bill short; secondaries with extensive white.
Al Jahra, Kuwait	Kuwait	T. r. iraquensis (Ticehurst, 1923)	Tigris–Euphrates river system in southeastern Iraq, southwestern Iran, and Kuwait; resident.	Eye dark brown; bill short; flanks brown; secondaries with extensive white.
Marievale, Gauteng, South Africa	Marievale, Gauteng, South Africa	T. r. capensis (Salvadori, 1884)	Sub-Saharan Africa, Madagascar, Comoros.	Eye reddish brown; flanks brown; secondaries with extensive white.
Sakai, Osaka, Japan	Kihoku, Mie Prefecture, Japan	T. r. poggei (Reichenow, 1902)	Eastern Asia, in Indochina, China, Korea, Taiwan, Japan, and the south Kuril Islands.	Eye pale yellow to white; bill long; flanks brown; secondaries with no or minimal white.
		T. r. philippensis (Bonnaterre, 1790)	Northern Philippines (Luzon and nearby islands), Borneo.	Eye pale yellow to white; bill long; flanks dark brown; secondaries with white.
		T. r. cotabato (Rand, 1948)	Southern Philippines (Mindanao).	Eye pale yellow to white; bill long; secondaries with white.
		T. r. vulcanorum (Rensch, B, 1929)	Java to Tanimbar Islands	Eye red; flanks blackish
		T. r. tricolor (Gray, GR, 1861)	Sulawesi to New Guinea and Lesser Sunda Islands	Eye red; flanks blackish
		T. r. collaris (Mayr, E, 1945)	northeastern New Guinea to Bougainville Island (northern Solomon Islands	Eye red; flanks blackish

The last three subspecies in the above table, T. r. vulcanorum, T. r. tricolor and T. r. collaris, have sometimes been treated as a separate species, the tricoloured grebe; it differs only slightly, notably in the red eyes, and blackish flanks and underparts.

== Description ==
The little grebe is a small water bird with a pointed bill. The adult is unmistakable in summer, predominantly dark above with its rich, rufous colour neck, cheeks and flanks, and bright yellow gape. The rufous is replaced by a dirty brownish grey in non-breeding and juvenile birds.

Juvenile birds have a yellow bill with a small black tip, and black and white streaks on the cheeks and sides of the neck as seen below. This yellow bill darkens as the juveniles age, eventually turning black in adulthood.

In winter, its size, buff plumage, with a darker back and cap, and "powder puff" rear end enable easy identification of this species. The little grebe's breeding call, given singly or in duet, is a trilled repeated weet-weet-weet or wee-wee-wee which sounds like a horse whinnying.

== Distribution ==
This bird breeds in small colonies in heavily vegetated areas of freshwater lakes across Europe, much of Asia down to New Guinea, and most of Africa. Most birds move to more open or coastal waters in winter, but it is only migratory in those parts of its range where the waters freeze. Outside of breeding season, it moves into more open water, occasionally even appearing on the coast in small bays.

== Behaviour ==
The little grebe is an excellent swimmer and diver and pursues its fish and aquatic invertebrate prey underwater. It uses the vegetation skilfully as a hiding place.

Like all grebes, it nests at the water's edge, since its legs are set very far back and it cannot walk well. Usually four to seven eggs are laid. When the adult bird leaves the nest it usually takes care to cover the eggs with weeds. This makes it less likely to be detected by predators. The young leave the nest and can swim soon after hatching, and chicks are often carried on the backs of the swimming adults. In India, the species breeds during the rainy season.

== Gallery ==
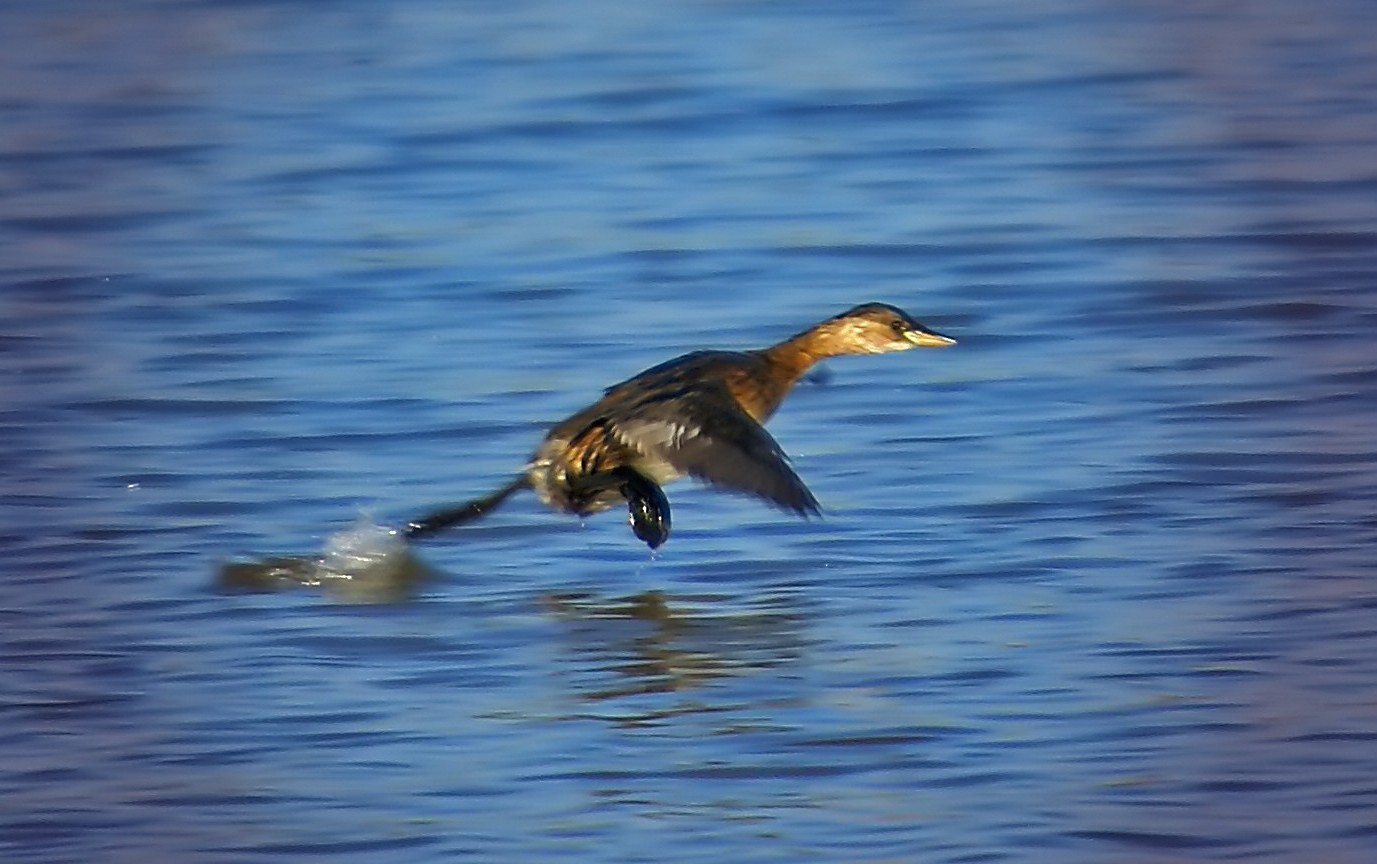
T. r. ruficollis in Spain; no white in the wing

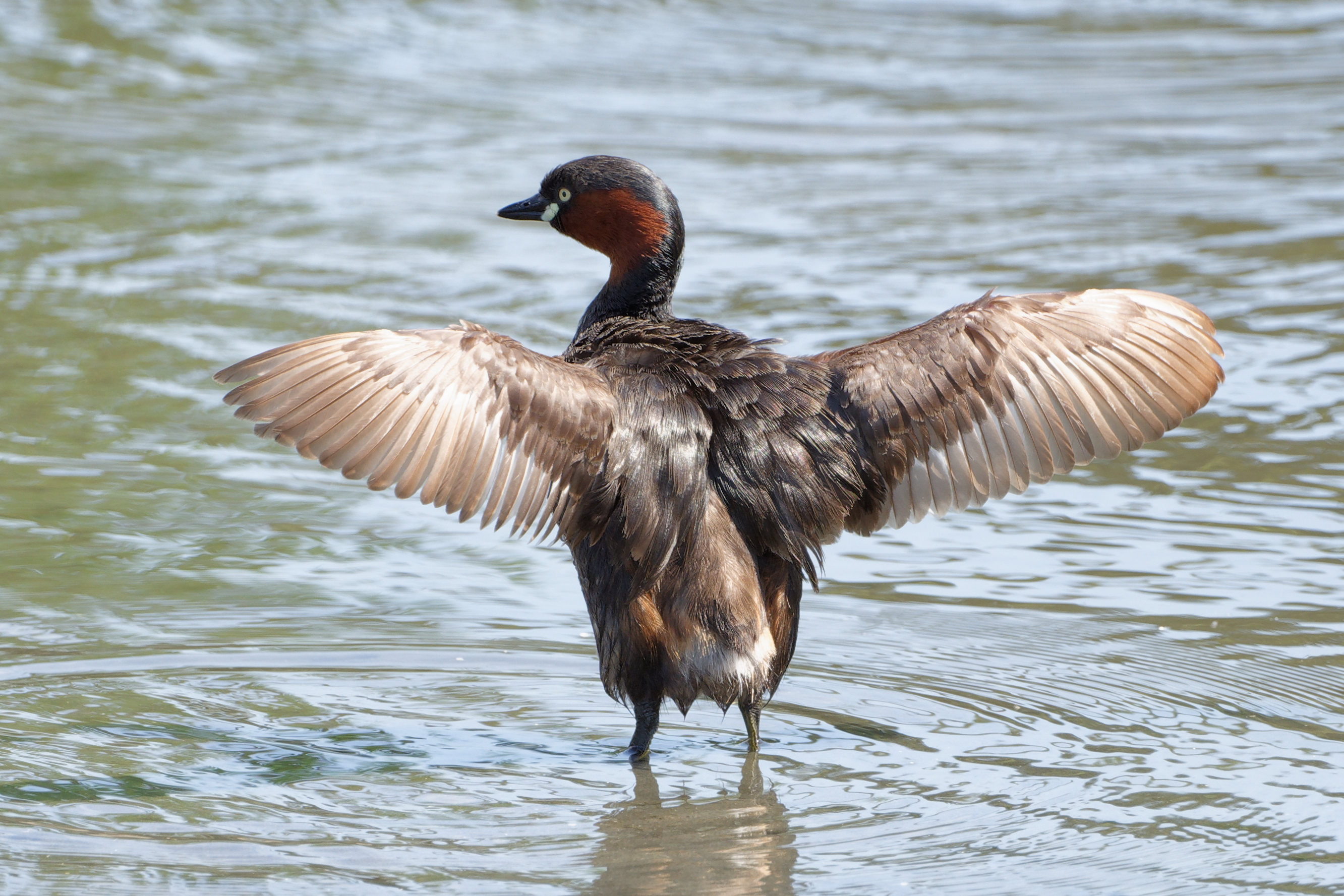
T. r. poggei in Japan; no white in the wing

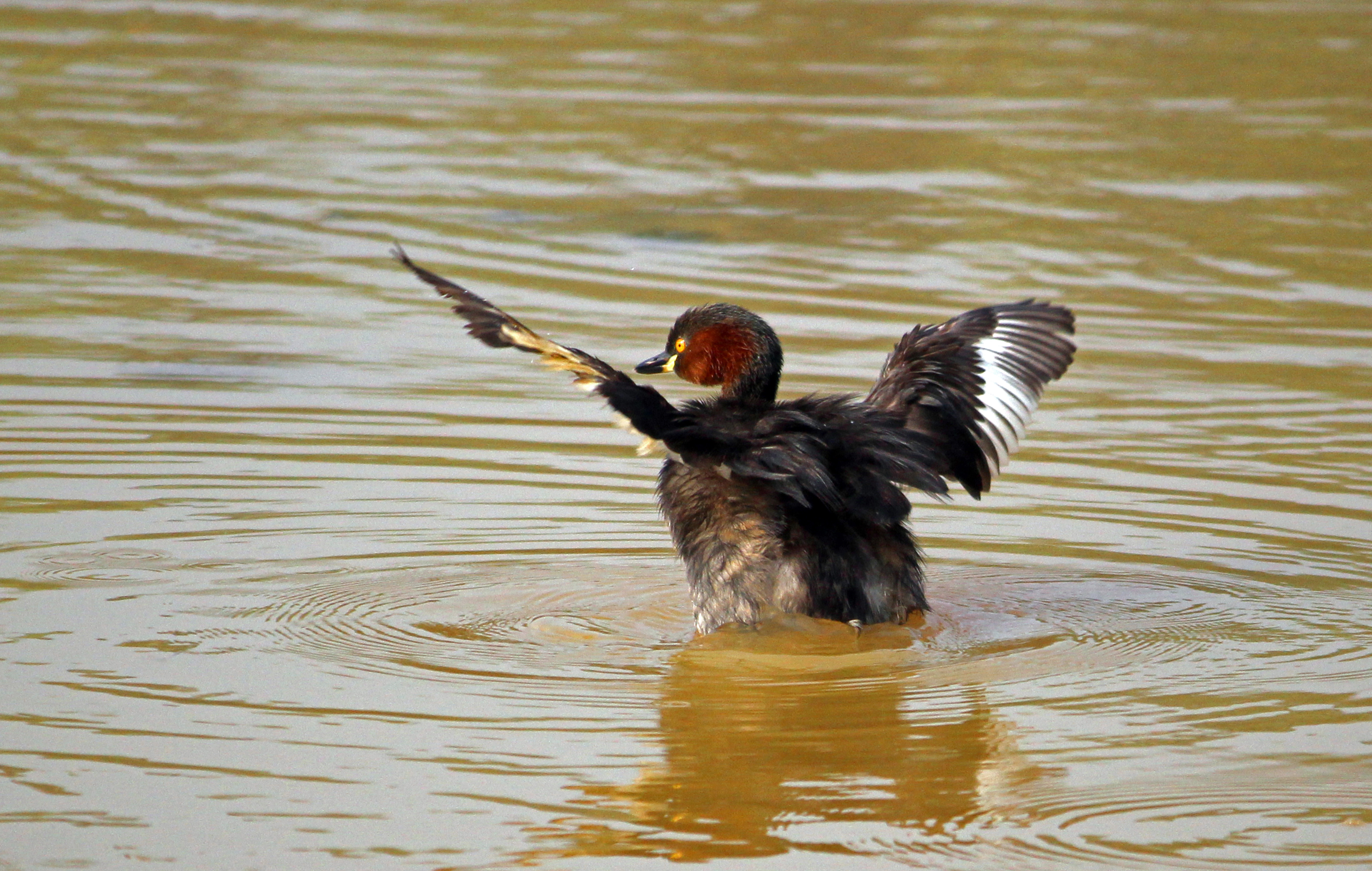
T. r. albescens in India; extensive white in the wing

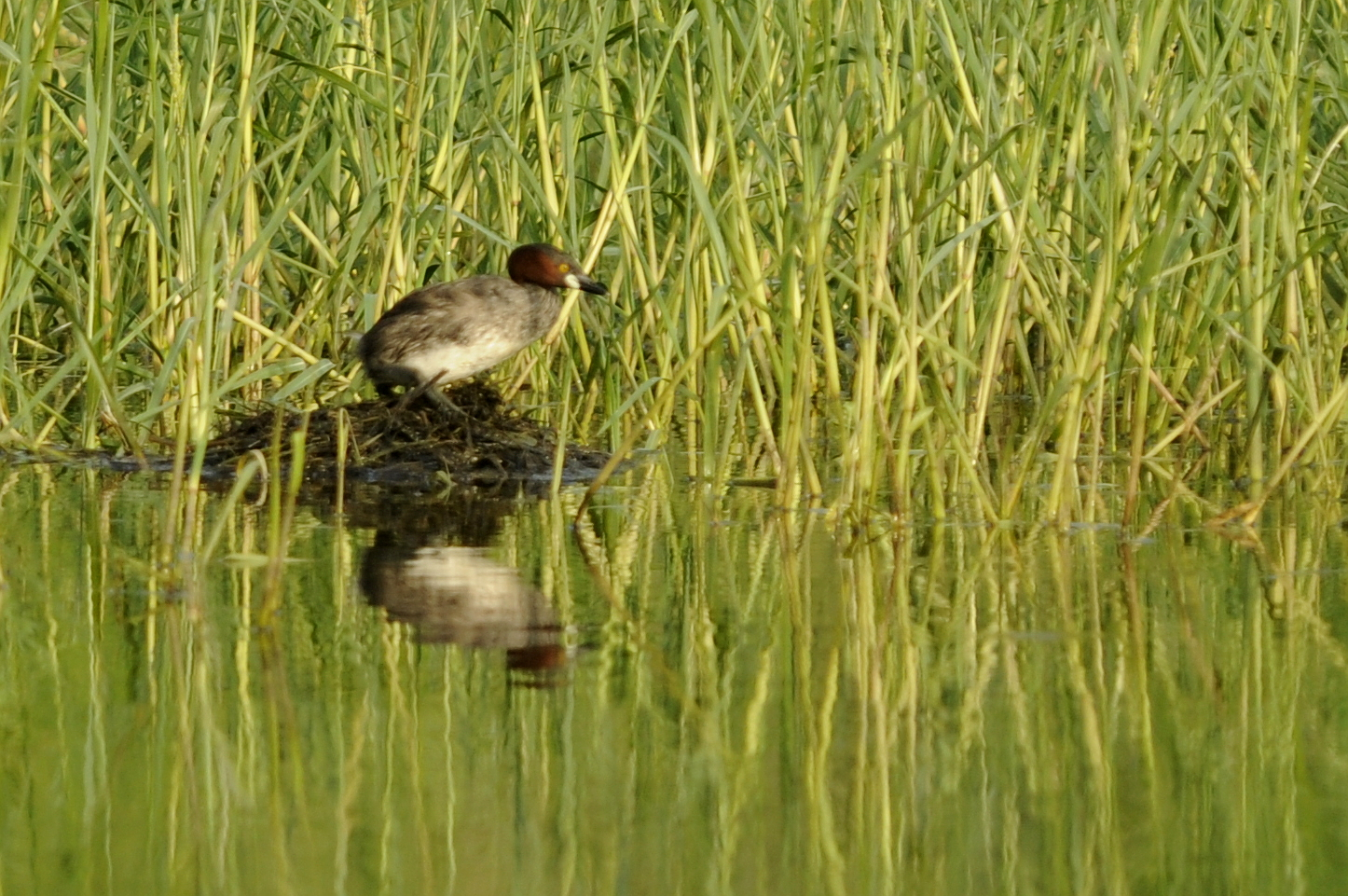
Nest at edge of lake in Jodhpur, Rajasthan, India

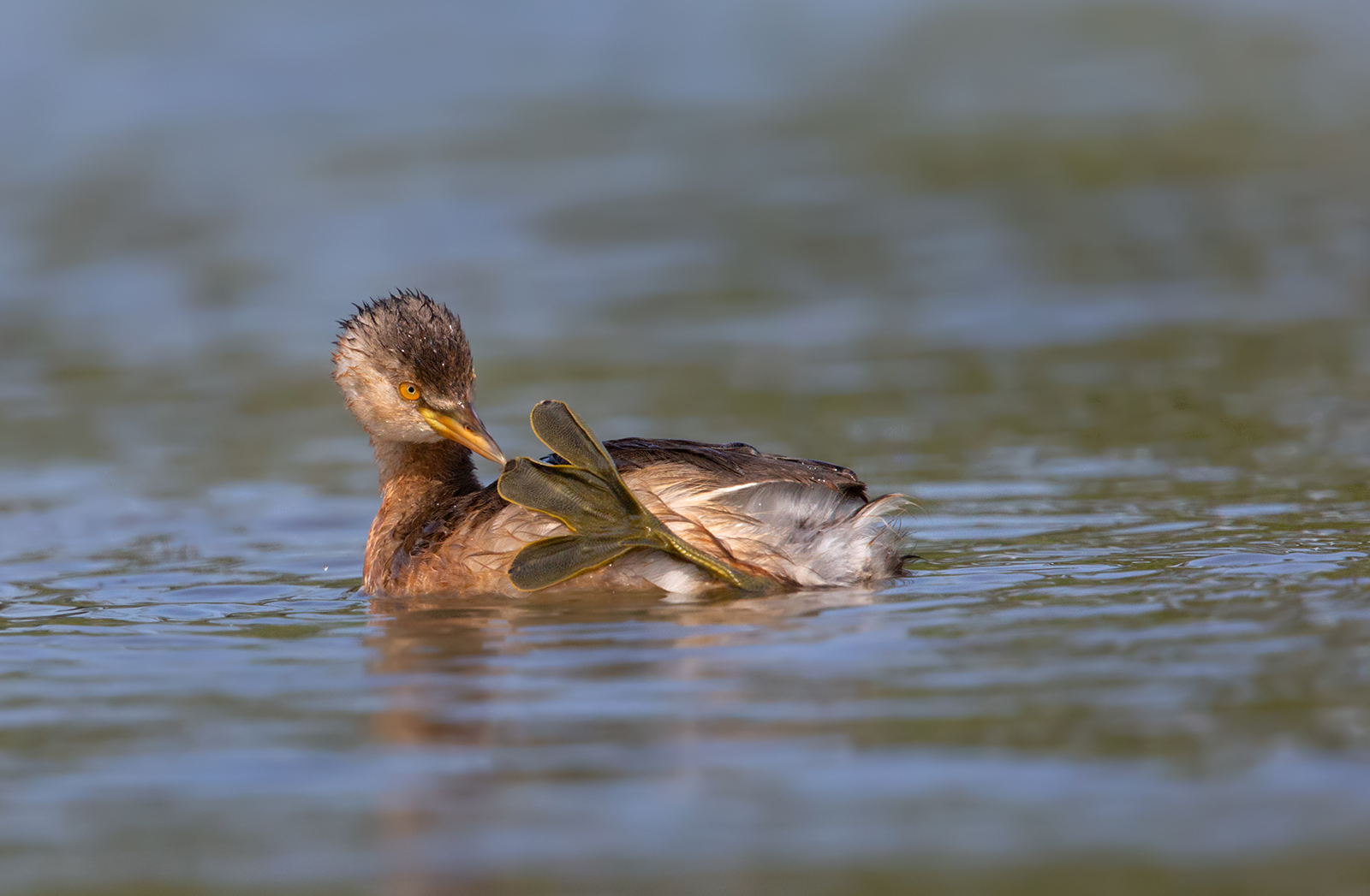
Grebe displaying its webbed feet

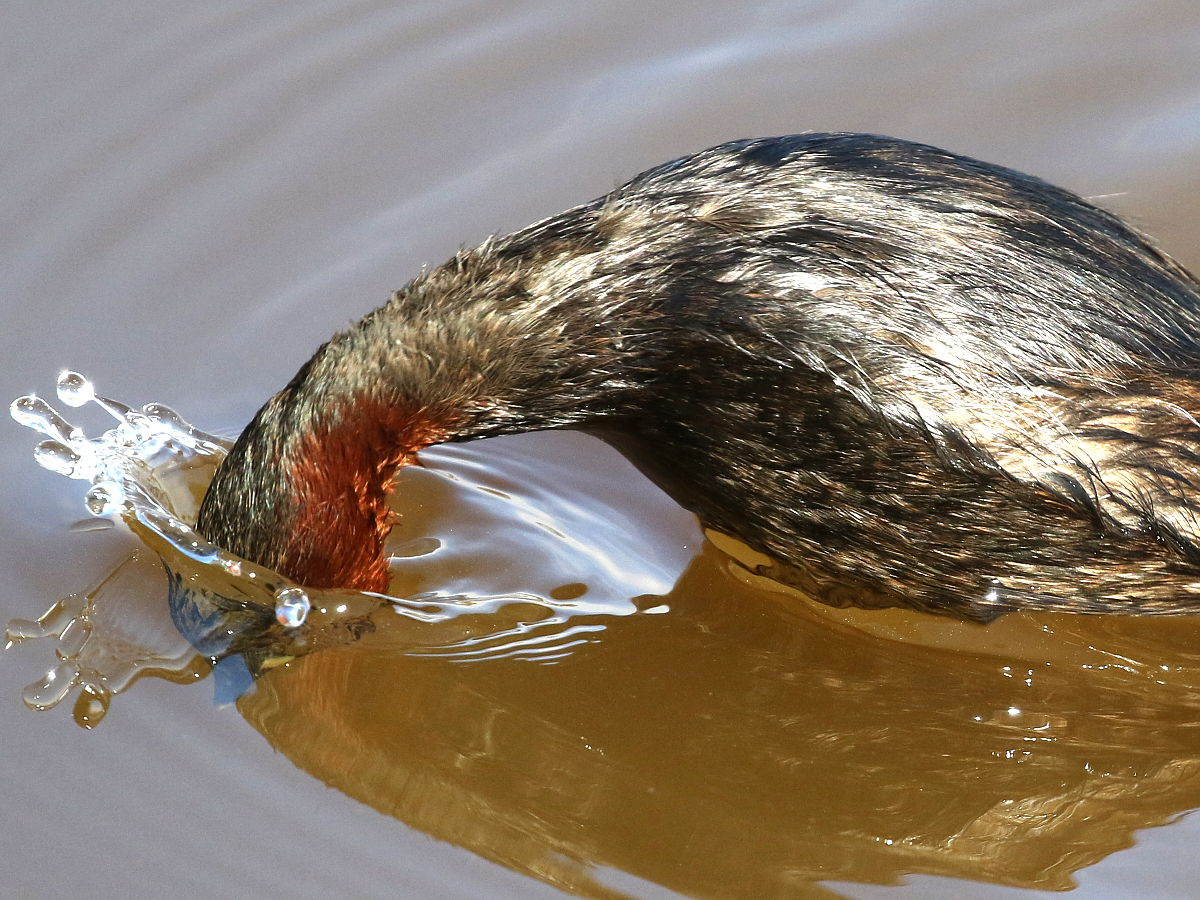
Diving at Delta del Llobregat, Barcelona

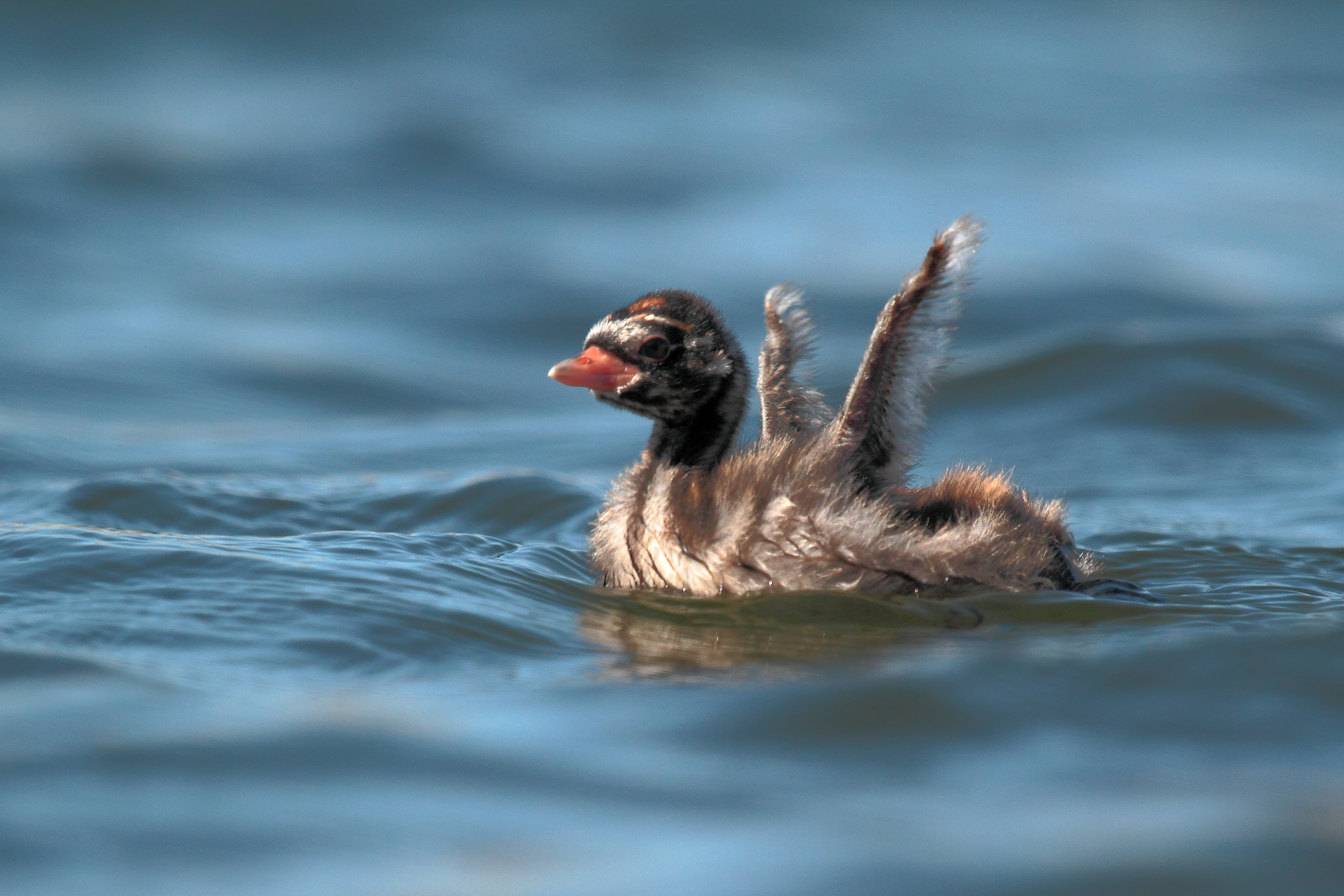
Chick

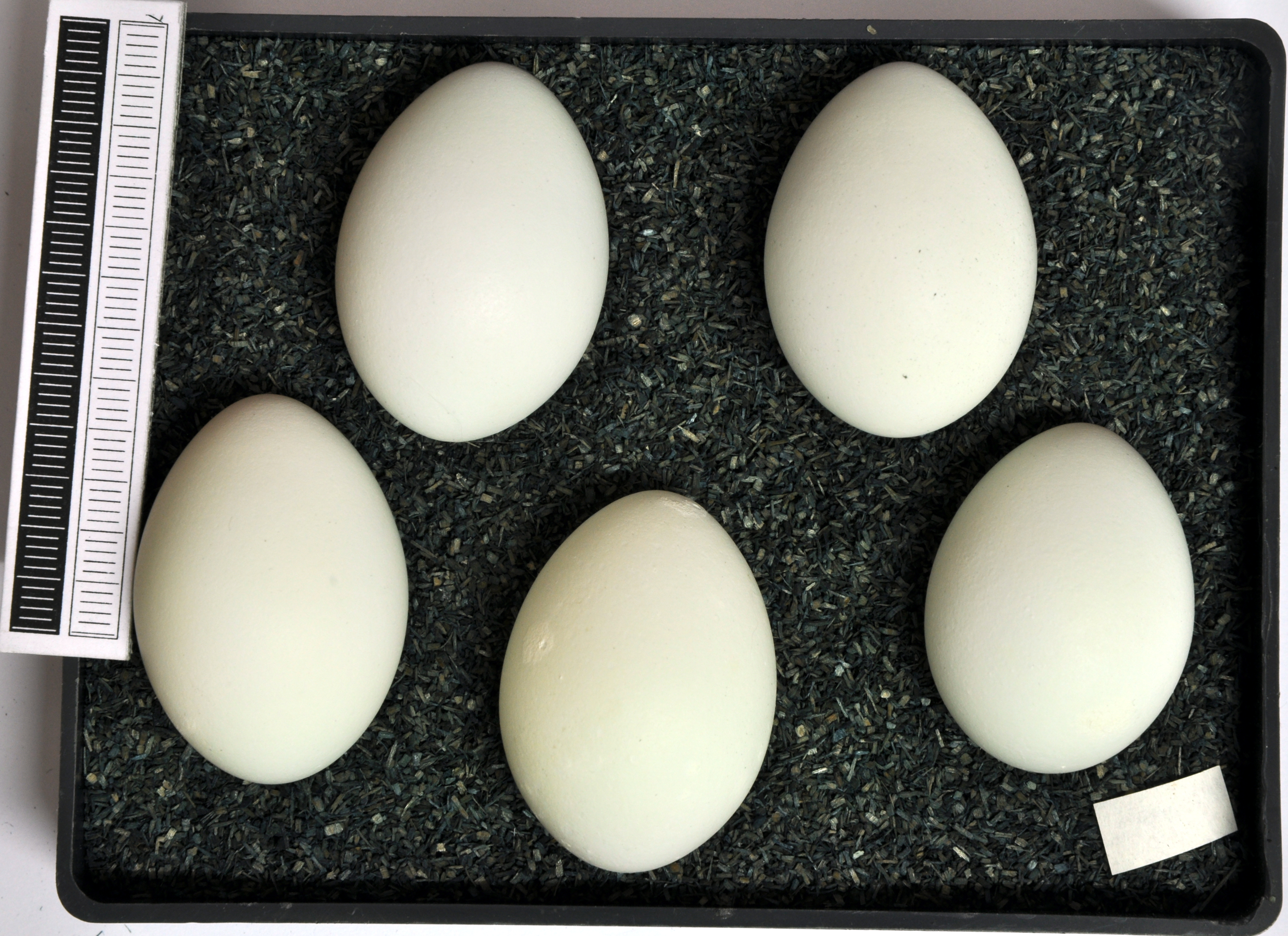
Eggs, Collection Museum Wiesbaden
