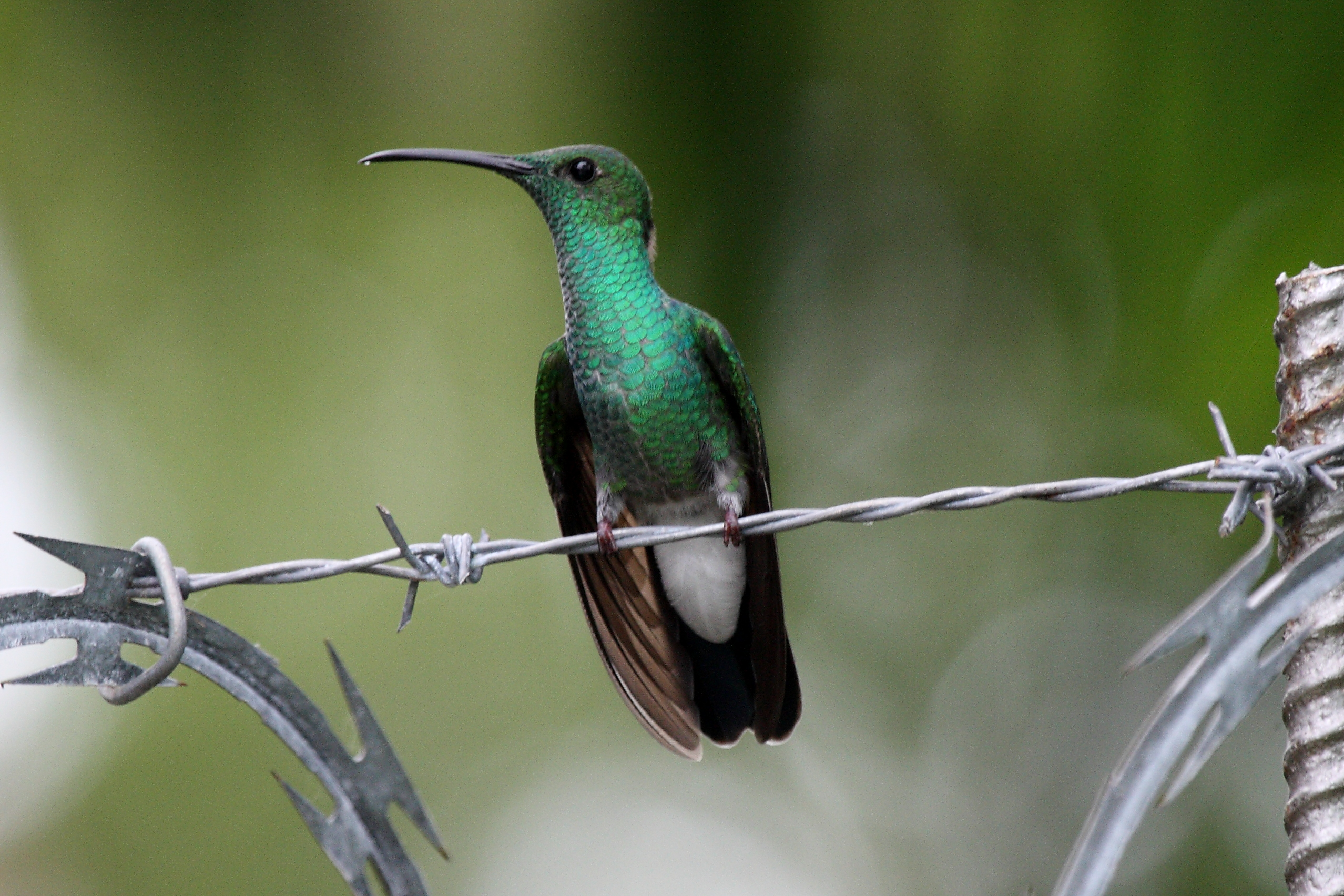
- Male
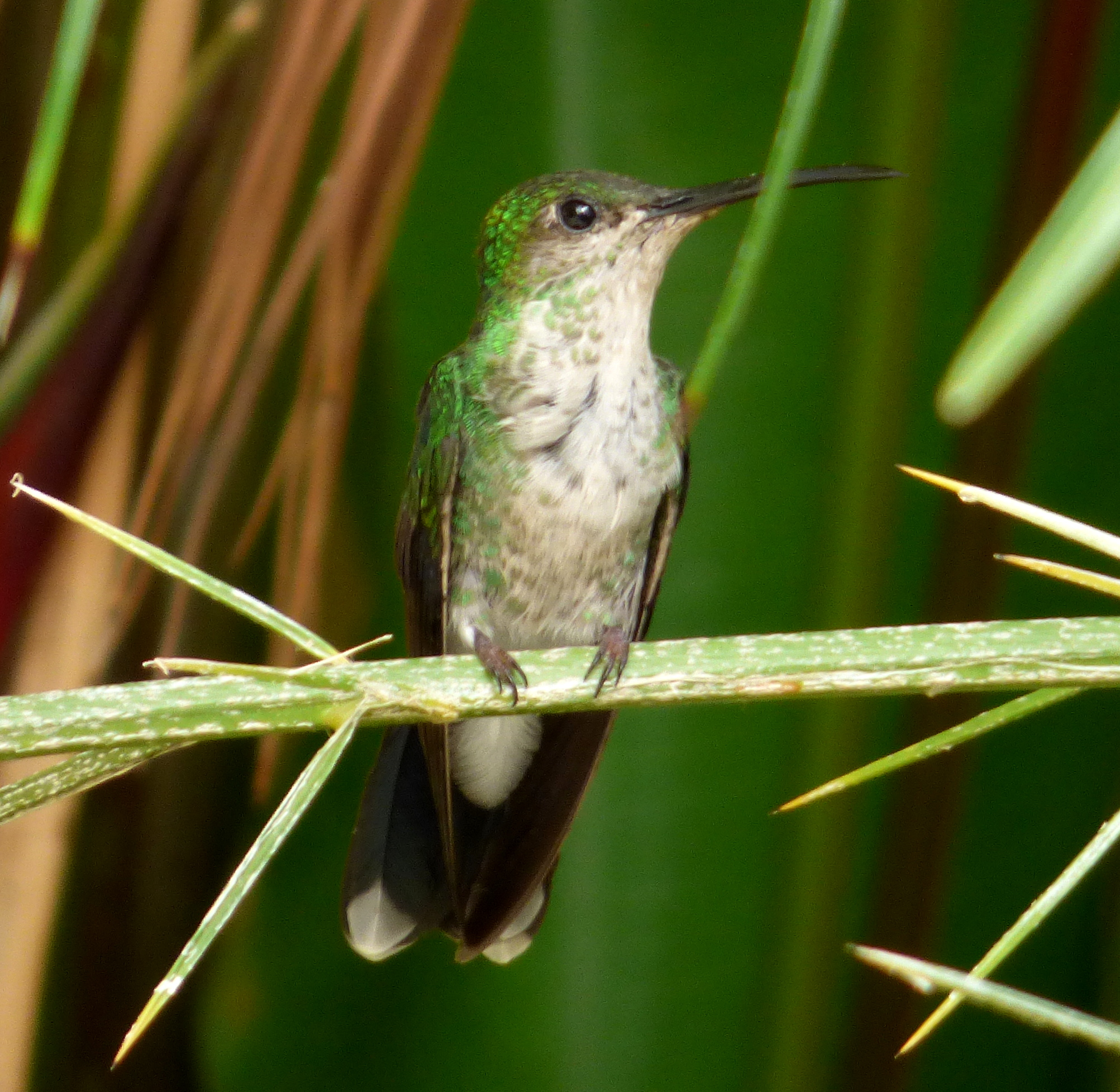
- Female

Conservation status
- Least Concern (IUCN 3.1)
- CITES Appendix II

Scientific classification
- Kingdom: Animalia
- Phylum: Chordata
- Class: Aves
- Order: Apodiformes
- Family: Trochilidae
- Genus: Chalybura
- Species: C. buffonii

Binomial name
- Chalybura buffonii (Lesson, 1832)
- Range of C. buffonii

= White-vented plumeleteer =

Species of hummingbird

The white-vented plumeleteer (Chalybura buffonii) is a species of hummingbird in the "emeralds", tribe Trochilini of subfamily Trochilinae. It is found in Colombia, Ecuador, Panama, Peru, and Venezuela.

== Taxonomy and systematics ==
Most taxonomic systems assign five subspecies to the white-vented plumeleteer:

- C. b. micans Bangs & Barbour, 1922
- C. b. buffonii Lesson, RP, (1832)
- C. b. aeneicauda Lawrence, 1865
- C. b. caeruleogaster Gould, (1847)
- C. b. intermedia Hartert, EJO & Hartert, CBE, 1894

However, BirdLife International's Handbook of the Birds of the World (HBW) assigns C. b. intermedia as a subspecies of bronze-tailed plumeleteer (C. urochrysia).

Both C. b. caeruleogaster and C. b. intermedia have at times been proposed as separate species.

== Description ==
The white-vented plumeleteer is 10.5 to 12 cm (4.1 to 4.7 in) long. Males weigh 6 to 7.3 g (0.21 to 0.26 oz) and females 5.9 to 7.9 g (0.21 to 0.28 oz). All of the subspecies except intermedia have a black bill and black feet; that one has a pinkish base to the mandible and pale pink to red feet.

Males of the nominate subspecies C. b. buffonii have mostly dark metallic green upperparts with a bronzy tinge to the crown and coppery bronze uppertail coverts. Their upper breast is bluish, lower breast bright metallic green, the lower belly whitish, and the undertail coverts long and white. Their tail is blue-black with a bronze gloss on the central feathers. Nominate females are paler metallic green above and gray below with green speckles on the side. Their tail is like the males' with the addition of dull gray tips on the outer feathers.

Subspecies C. b. micans is larger than the nominate. Males' central tail feathers are a deeper blue and females' undersides are a clearer gray. C. b. aeneicauda males are a more golden-green below than the nominate and their central tail feathers are bright bronze-green to copper-bronze. Females have pale gray underparts with sparse green flecks. C. b. caeruleogaster is the largest subspecies. The male has a bluish green throat and belly and a blue breast. Females have gray underparts with no flecking. C. b. intermedia males have a greenish-blue breast, a gray belly, and a dark blue tail.

== Distribution and habitat ==
The subspecies of white-vented plumeleteer are distributed thus:

- C. b. micans, central and eastern Panama, western Colombia, and Colombia's Cauca River and far upper Magdalena River valleys
- C. b. buffonii, from central Colombia's upper and middle Magdalena valley east through extreme northeastern Colombia into northwestern Venezuela
- C. b. aeneicauda, Colombia's lower Magdalena valley and Santa Marta region and east into western and north-central Venezuela
- C. b. caeruleogaster, eastern slope of Colombia's Eastern Andes
- C. b. intermedia, southwestern Ecuador and northwestern Peru

The white-vented plumeleteer inhabits a variety of landscapes including the edges and interiors of dry, moist, and wet forests, semi-open woodlands, secondary forest, and scrublands. The subspecies differ somewhat in their requirements; only caeruleogaster and sometimes buffonii frequent the interior of wet forest. In elevation the species ranges from sea level to as high as 2,000 m (6,600 ft).

== Behavior ==
=== Movement ===
The white-vented plumeleteer is not known to migrate or make seasonal movements.

=== Feeding ===
The white-vented plumeleteer forages for nectar at a wide variety of flowering plants from the understory almost to the canopy. It mostly forages by trap-lining, visiting a circuit of flowers, but also aggressively defends rich patches. In addition to nectar it catches small arthropods by hawking from a perch, hovering, and hover-gleaning from vegetation and spider webs.

=== Breeding ===
The white-vented plumeleteer's breeding seasons vary across its range, including September in Panama, February to August in the Magdalena valley, June to November in the Eastern Andes, and perhaps year-round in parts of Venezuela. Its nest is a cup of plant down bound with spiderweb with moss and lichen on the outside. Nests have been found on tree branches as high as 2.5 m (8 ft) above the ground. The only nest that was closely monitored held two eggs and its single hatchling fledged in 21 days.

=== Vocalization ===
The white-vented plumeleteer's song has not been described in words, but it is known to make "chip" notes while foraging.

== Status ==
The IUCN has assessed the white-vented plumeleteer as being of least concern. It has a large range and an estimated population of at least 500,000 mature individuals, though the latter is believed to be decreasing. No immediate threats have been identified. It is considered uncommon to fairly common in most areas and seems to be able to tolerate some habitat disturbance. Deforestation of C. b. caeruleogaster's range is extensive, however.
