= David Morrison Reid Henry =

British painter

David Morrison Reid Henry (14 September 1919 – 1977; sometimes written Reid-Henry), of British origin, was an illustrator of birds. He signed his pictures DM Henry or D.M.H..

Reid Henry was the son of entomologist and ornithologist George Morrison Reid Henry and Olive Hobday. He had an elder brother, Bruce Charles Reid Henry. He was educated at Mount Radford School, Exeter and was encouraged to pursue his artistic talents.

He played cricket for South Woodford in 1970 and died in Rhodesia in 1977.

== Bibliography ==
Henry illustrated:

- A Falcon in the Field, Jack Mavrogordato
- The Popular Handbook of Rarer British birds (P. A. D. Hollom) H. F. & G. Witherby (1960)
- The Birds of the Atlantic Islands (David Armitage Bannerman and W. Mary Bannerman) (4 vols) 1963-1968 ISBN 9780050018026
- A New Dictionary of Birds, Sir Arthur Landsborough Thomson (Ed.), 1964
- Eagles, Hawks and Falcons of the World Dean Amadon, Leslie Brown, Country Life Books, 1968.
- Reid-Henry, Louise. (1979). COMMEMORATIVE PRINTS. Mazoe: Frank Read Press.

== Biography ==
- Highlight the Wild: The Art of the Reid Henrys, Bruce Henry; Palaquin Publishing Ltd., Hartley Wintney, Hampshire; 1986 ISBN 0-906814-01-4
- Hosking, E (1977). "Obituary: David Morrison Reid-Henry (1919-1977)" (PDF). British Birds. 70: 539–541. ISSN 0007-0335.
