= 1921 Oxford University Spitsbergen expedition =

Scientific exploration of Spitsbergen, Norway

The 1921 Oxford University Spitsbergen expedition took place over the period June–August 1921 and was led by F.C.R. Jourdain (1865–1940).

== Science ==
The initial ornithological focus "was rapidly enlarged to embrace a range of interest, so diverse that the party had to be organized in two independent sections". Although over 30 articles arising from the expedition had been published by 1924 and a compilation volume bringing together those papers had also been published, a full and detailed account of the expedition was not made available until almost 60 years later by which time the data and material from the expedition had led to additional publications.

== Expedition members ==
Apart from the leader, Jourdain, other members included:

- Charles Sutherland Elton (1900–1991), aged 21 at the time of the expedition, later becoming "a towering figure in the history of animal ecology" and elected a Fellow of the Royal Society.
- George Binney (1900–1972), aged 21 at the time of the expedition, later to become Sir Frederick George Binney, DSO.
- Julian Huxley (1887–1975), aged 35 at the time of the expedition, later to become Sir Julian Huxley and elected a Fellow of the Royal Society for his work on evolutionary biology.
- Alexander Carr-Saunders (1886–1966), aged 35 at the time of the expedition, later to become Sir Alexander Morris Carr-Saunders, KBE, FBA and for 20 years was the director of the London School of Economics.
- Seton Gordon (1886–1977), aged 35 at the time of the expedition, who authored multiple books about the wildlife and scenery of Scotland as well as the book "Amid Snowy Wastes - Wild Life On The Spitsberg Archipelago" which provides his narrative of the 1921 expedition.
- Tom Longstaff (1875–1964), aged 46 at the time of the expedition, a member of the 1922 British Mount Everest expedition. His autobiography includes a chapter about the Spitsbergen expedition.
- Noel Odell (1890–1987), aged 31 at the time of the expedition, he was the last person to see Mallory and Irvine before they disappeared on the upper slopes of Everest during the 1922 British Mount Everest expedition.
- V. S. Summerhayes (1897–1974), aged 24 at the time of the expedition, later in charge of the orchid herbarium at the Royal Botanic Gardens, Kew, an international figure in the study of orchids and awarded an OBE in 1950.
- Robert Alexander Frazer (1891–1959), aged 30 at the time of the expedition, in 1946 he was elected a Fellow of the Royal Society for his work on aeronautics.
- James Douglas Brown (1899–1971), aged 22 at the time of the expedition, OBE.
- Ralph Walter Segnit (1892–1965), aged 29 at the time of the expedition, later president of the Royal Society of South Australia (1940)
- George Slater (1874–1956), aged 47 at the time of the expedition.
- Arthur Hamilton Paget Wilkes (1898–1955), aged 23 at the time of the expedition, the son of Alpheus Paget Wilkes, he later became the father of Michael Paget-Wilkes.
