= Handbook of British Birds =

The Handbook of British Birds
- Author: H.F. Witherby; Rev. F.C.R. Jourdain; Norman F. Ticehurst; Bernard W. Tucker
- Illustrator: Marinus Adrianus Koekkoek the Younger
- Language: English
- Subject: Ornithology
- Publisher: H. F. & G. Witherby under Harry Forbes Witherby
- Publication date: 1938-1941
- Publication place: United Kingdom
- Preceded by: Practical Handbook of British Birds
- Followed by: The Birds of the Western Palearctic

The Handbook of British Birds was a pioneering bird guide by H.F. Witherby, Rev. F.C.R. Jourdain, Norman F. Ticehurst and Bernard W. Tucker, published in five volumes by H. F. & G. Witherby between 1938–1941.

== The Handbook ==
The Handbook, as it was often cited, was itself a much enlarged and revised version of H.F. Witherby's Practical Handbook of British Birds (published between 1919 and 1924 as two volumes in three parts).

Some of the plates were by Marinus Adrianus Koekkoek the Younger and were licensed after they were painted for Ornithologia Neerlandica, de vogels van Nederland by Eduard Daniel van Oort (published 1922-1935).

The Handbook was reprinted a number of times, until at least the eight impression in 1958. The later printings (they were not described as new editions) having a few pages devoted to "additions and corrections" to previous "impressions", but few of these are of great significance. In only a few cases was the main text correspondingly corrected.

Eventually, it was superseded by The Birds of the Western Palearctic.

== Reception ==
The first volume of the first edition, that was published in 1938, received a positive reception in The Auk. G.M.A. wrote that the new handbook was a work "which cannot fail to find immediate approval and extensive use by ornithologist, whether professional or amateur, on both sides of the water, as a convenient and authoritative reference book on birds of the western palearctic region."

== Popular Handbook of British Birds ==
The Popular Handbook of British Birds
- Author: Philip Hollom
- Language: English
- Subject: Ornithology
- Publisher: H. F. & G. Witherby
- Publication date: 1952
- Publication place: United Kingdom

A single-volume concise edition, The Popular Handbook of British Birds was produced by Philip Hollom in 1952. It used descriptions drawn from the Handbook and updated accounts of their status and distribution. Revised editions appeared in 1955, 1962, 1968 and 1988. These editions were far more heavily revised than those of the original Handbook, not least to take account of changes in bird taxonomy, as described in each edition's new forward.

=== Fourth edition ===
(SBN 85493 002 7)

The 1968 edition complied with the then-new British Ornithologists' Union checklist, and incorporated further research by J. L. F. Parslow. Its 511 numbered pages described 330 species. The eggs of all breeding species were illustrated, at life size, mostly in colour

=== Fifth edition ===
(ISBN 0-85493-169-4)

Produced in 1988, this was the first edition not to include the forewords from preceding editions. The entire text was reset, the status and distribution accounts were again revised, and the species sorted into the then-current taxonomic order, ending with the buntings. The jacket illustration showed blue tit, coal tit and long-tailed tit, with a great spotted woodpecker on the spine, and was by Norman Arlott. 350 species were described. It ran to 486 numbered pages.

== Popular Handbook of Rarer British birds ==
The Popular Handbook of Rarer British Birds
- Author: Philip Hollom
- Illustrator: David Reid-Henry et al
- Language: English
- Subject: Ornithology
- Publisher: H. F. & G. Witherby
- Publication date: 1960
- Publication place: United Kingdom

Hollom also produced the supplemental The Popular Handbook of Rarer British Birds, in 1960. It described over 100 species omitted, on the grounds of their scarcity in Britain, from the Popular Handbook, about 30 of which had not occurred there at the time of the original Handbook. New plates were specially commissioned from David Reid-Henry (and one, of a Baikal teal, by Peter Scott), to add to those re-used from the Handbook.
