= Seton Gordon =

Scottish naturalist, photographer and folklorist

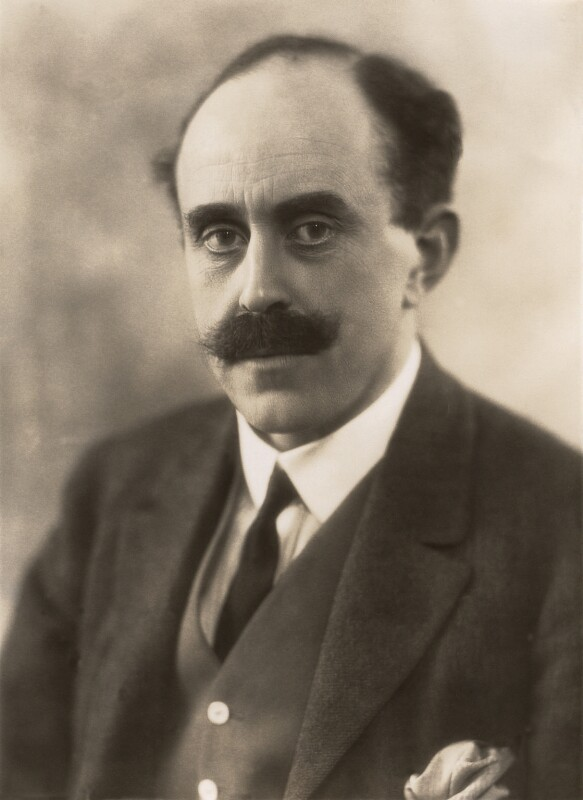
Gordon in 1928

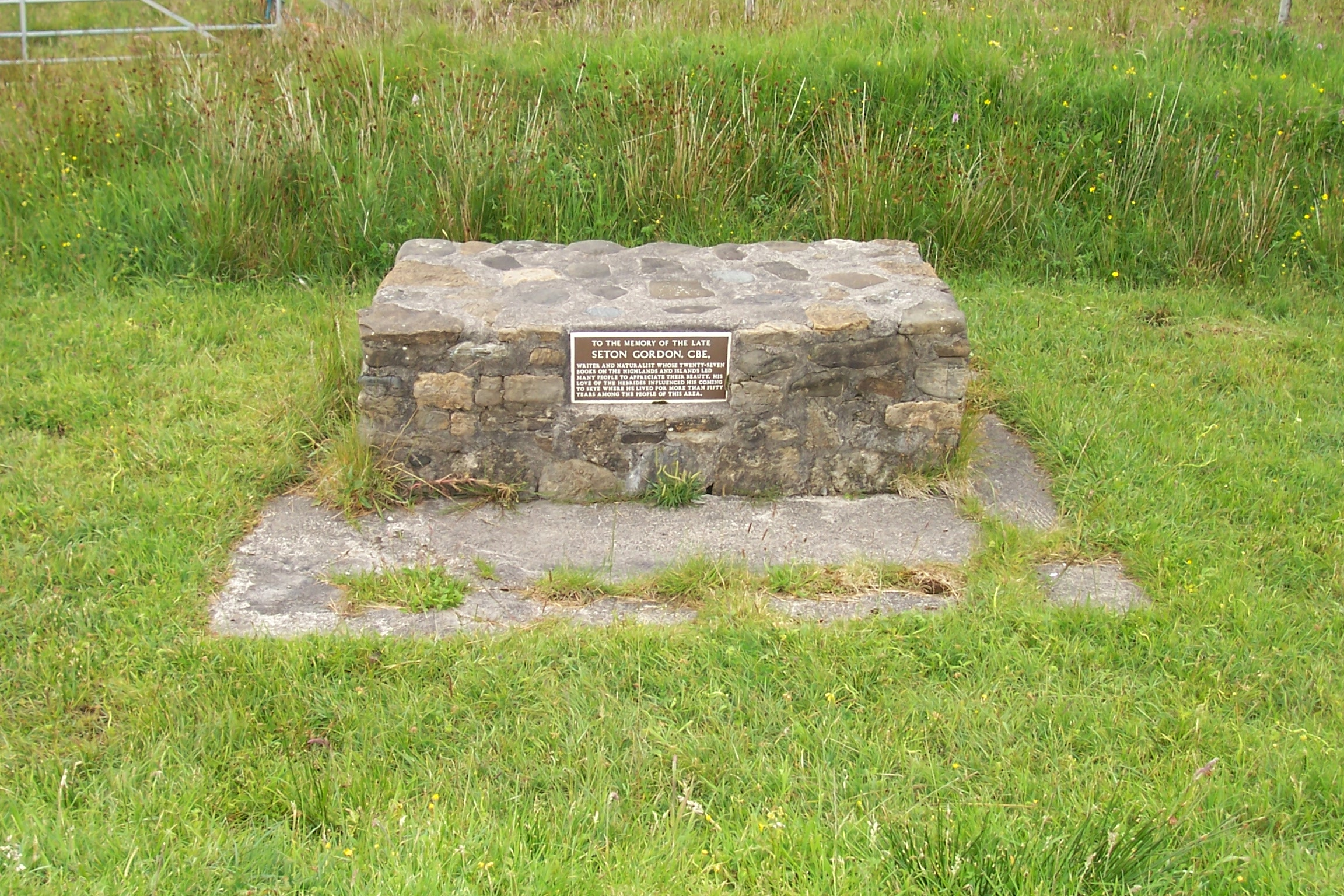
Memorial to Seton Gordon near Kilmuir Cemetery on the Isle of Skye. It reads: "In the memory of the late Seton Gordon, CBE, writer and naturalist whose twenty-seven books on the highlands and islands led many people to appreciate their beauty. His love of the Hebrides influenced his coming to Skye where he lived for more than fifty years among the people of this area."

Seton Gordon CBE (1886–1977) was a Scottish naturalist, photographer and folklorist.

Gordon began exploring the Highlands of Scotland as a boy, particularly the Cairngorms. He later became a world-famous naturalist, photographer and folklorist, describing the wildlife and scenery of Scotland. His books are still widely available, and a recent anthology has been published. Their appeal is based upon the knowledge of natural history displayed, together with his ability as a writer.

Born in Aberdeen, he lived on Deeside and was educated privately and at Oxford. At the latter, Gordon knew Prince Felix Yusupov (1887-1967) and in 1913 he travelled to the Crimea (where he visited Koreiz) and St Petersburg. Given cameras as a young man, his books were illustrated with photographs taken by himself and his first wife, Audrey Gordon, for many years his companion and helper in the field.

He accompanied the 1921 Oxford University Spitsbergen expedition and took many photographs there, his narrative of the 1921 expedition is given in his book "Amid Snowy Wastes - Wild Life On The Spitsberg Archipelago".

However, the birds of the Scottish mountains and glens were always his real passion. From his home in Aviemore (and later the Isle of Skye), he made regular forays into the wilds. Of all the Scottish birds, the golden eagle was his favourite. He is believed to have been the first to photograph both the snow bunting and the whooper swan at nests in Scotland. He was appointed a Commander of the Order of the British Empire (CBE) in the 1939 Birthday Honours, "for services to literature and natural history".

He judged many piping competitions, often with Angus MacPherson of Invershin (1877-1976) and Jock MacDonald of Viewfield, including his own favourite, the Glenfinnan Gathering. He was close to many of the landed families of Scotland.

== Publications ==
Here is a listing of his publications:

- 1907 – Birds of the Loch and Mountain (Cassell)
- 1912 – The Charm of the Hills (Cassell)
- 1915 – Hill Birds of Scotland (Edward Arnold)
- 1920 – Land of the Hills and the Glens – Wild Life of Iona & the Inner Hebrides (Cassell)
- 1921 – Wanderings of a Naturalist (Cassell)
- 1922 – Amid snowy wastes (Cassell)
- 1923 – Hebridean Memories (Cassell)
- 1925 – The Cairngorm Hills of Scotland (Cassell)
- 1926 – The Immortal Isles (Williams & Norgate)
- 1927 – Days With the Golden Eagle (Williams & Norgate)
- 1929 – The Charm of Skye: The Winged Isle (Cassell)
- 1931 – In the Highlands (Cassell)
- 1933 – Islands of the West (Cassell)
- 1935 – Highways and Byways in the West Highlands (Macmillan)
- 1935 – Sea-Gulls in London (Cassell)
- 1936 – Thirty Years of Nature Photography: a Personal Record of Two Observers (Cassell)
- 1937 – Afoot in Wild Places (Cassell)
- 1937 – Edward Grey of Fallodon and His Birds (Country Life)
- 1938 – Wild Birds in Britain (Batsford)
- 1941 – In Search of Northern Birds (Eyre & Spottiswoode)
- 1944 – A Highland Year (Eyre & Spottiswoode)
- 1948 – Highways and Byways in the Central Highlands (Macmillan)
- 1950 – Afoot in the Hebrides (Country Life)
- 1951 – Highlands of Scotland (Robert Hale)
- 1955 – The Golden Eagle, King of Birds (Collins)
- 1956 – Colourful Scotland (Oliver & Boyd)
- 1963 – Highland Days (Cassell)
- 1971 – Highland Summer (Cassell)

Co-authored:

- 1933 – Tales Of The Untamed (Collins)
- 1936 – Nature in Britain: an illustrated survey (Batsford)
- 1960 – Scotland's Splendour (Collins)
