= George Morrison Reid Henry =

George Morrison Reid Henry (17 February 1891, Sri Lanka – June 1983, England) was an entomologist, bird artist, and ornithologist in Sri Lanka.

He was born at Goatfell Estate, Kandapola, Sri Lanka where his father, Charles Reid Henry, managed tea estates. He was one of eleven children and was educated at home by his older sisters. He showed an early talent as an artist and obtained his first job as a draughtsman and a laboratory assistant in the Ceylon Company of Pearl Fishers in 1907 at the age of 16. In 1910 he became a draughtsman at the Colombo Museum and was trained by Dr. Joseph Pearson, Director of the Colombo Museum, who was a zoologist and marine biologist. In July 1913 he was promoted to the newly created post of Assistant in Systematic Entomology at the Colombo Museum, a post he held until his retirement in 1946. George Henry married Olive Hobday in September 1917. His elder son, Bruce Charles Reid Henry, was born on 22 July 1918 and his younger son David Morrison Reid Henry was born on 14 September 1919. Both sons inherited George's talent for drawing and David (who died in Zimbabwe in 1977) became a fine bird and wildlife artist. Olive died in 1969.

== Publications ==
- Henry, G. M. 1915. Cannibalism in Pulchriphyllium crurifolium, Serv.Spol. Zeyl. 10(37): 176.
- Henry, G. M. 1922. Stridulation in the leaf-insect. Spol. Zeyl. 12(45): 217–219, 1 plt.
- Henry, G. M. 1931. New Ceylon Rhynchota. Spol. Zeyl. 16(2): 115–121, 3 pl.
- Henry, G. M. 1931. New Ceylonese Mantodea. Spol. Zeyl. 16(2): 123–128, 2 plts.
- Henry, G. M. 1932. Notes on Ceylon Tettigoniidae, with descriptions of new species. Part 1. Spol. Zeyl. 16(3): 229–256, 8 plts.
- Henry, G. M. 1932. Observations on some Ceylonese Mantodea with descriptions of new species. Spol. Zeyl. 17(1): 1-18, 5 plts.
- Henry, G. M. 1933. Descriptions and records of Ceylonese Acrididae. Spol. Zeyl. 17(3): 155–200, 9 plts.
- Henry, G. M. 1933. Observations on the genus Genimen Bolivar (Insecta, Acrididae), with description of a new genus and species. Spol. Zeyl. 18(1): 193–198, 1 plt.
- Henry, G. M. 1934. New and rare Hexacentrinae (Insecta, Orthoptera) from Ceylon. Spol. Zeyl. 19(1): 1-21, 3 plts.
- Henry, G. M. 1937. A new genus and species of Acrididae from South India and Ceylon (Orthoptera). Proc. Ent. Soc. London B 6: 197–200, 1 plt.
- Henry, G. M. 1937. Euprepocnemis kalkudensis sp. nov. (Insecta, Acrididae) from Ceylon with remarks on Euprepocnemis alacris (Serville) in the island. Spol. Zeyl. 20(3): 343–345, 1 plt.
- Henry, G. M. 1939. A new tettigoniid genus and species from Ceylon. Spol. Zeyl. 21(3): 229–232, 1 plt.
- Henry, G. M. 1939. Five new species of Pseudophaneroptera Brunner (Insecta, Tettigoniidae) from Ceylon. Spol. Zeyl. 21(2): 97-111, 3 plts.
- Henry, G. M. 1939. The genus Zumala Walker, (Insecta, Orthoptera) with description of a new species. Spol. Zeyl. 21(3): 219–228, 4 plts.
- Henry, G. M. 1940. A new Indian genus and species of Tettigoniidae (Orthoptera). Trans. Roy. Ent. Soc. London B 9: 97-101.
- Henry, G. M. 1940. New or little known South Indian Acrididae (Orthoptera). Trans. Roy. Ent. Soc. London 90(19): 497–540.
- Henry, G. M. 1940. The genus Pelerinus Bolivar (Allodapa) (Orthoptera, Tettigoniidae) with descriptions of three new species. Proc. Roy. Ent. Soc. London B 99: 7-15.
- Henry, G. M. 1940. Timanthes Stal and Pirmeda, gen. nov. (Orthoptera, Tettigoniidae). Annals and Magazine of Natural History (11) 6: 321–334, 1 plt. doi:10.1080/03745481.1940.9723686
- Henry, G. M. 1942. Three remarkable stridulatory mechanisms in Acrididae (Orthoptera). Proc. Roy. Ent. Soc. London A 17: 59–62.
- Woodhouse, L. G. O. & Henry, G. M. R. 1942. The Butterfly Fauna of Ceylon. Government Record Office, Colombo.
- Henry, G. M. 1944. Diogena lankae sp. nov. (Insecta, Orthoptera, Tettigoniidae). Spol. Zeyl. 22(2): 183–186, 1 plt.
- Henry, G. M. 1944. Facial asymmetry in Eumastacidae (Orthoptera, Acridoidea). Spol. Zeyl. 22(): 191.
- Henry, G. M. 1944. Notes on the behaviour of Orchetypus rugifrons (Orthoptera, Acridoidea, Eumastacidae). Spol. Zeyl. 22(2): 193–195.
- Henry, G. M. 1971. A Guide to the Birds of Ceylon. Oxford University Press, London. (First published 1955)

== Other sources ==
- Wijesinghe, Priyantha, G. M. Henry, the Ceylonese entomologist. In Nathistory-India email discussion list. 23-Feb-1997
