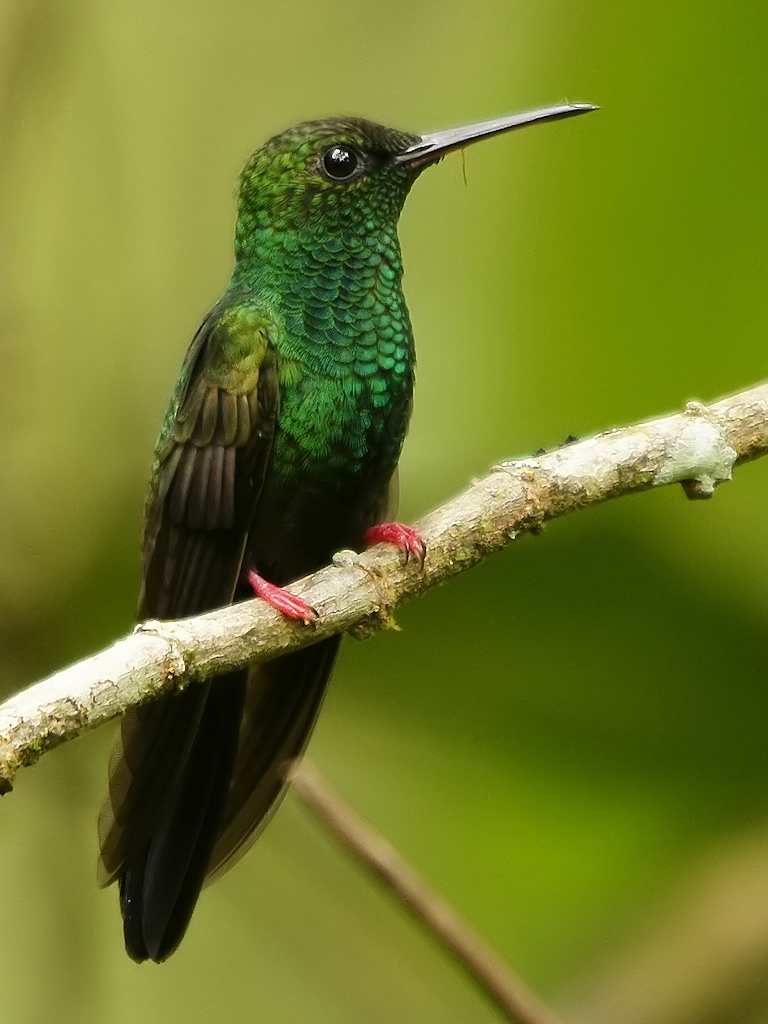
- Bronze-tailed plumeleteer (Chalybura urochrysia)

Scientific classification
- Kingdom: Animalia
- Phylum: Chordata
- Class: Aves
- Clade: Strisores
- Order: Apodiformes
- Family: Trochilidae
- Tribe: Trochilini
- Genus: Chalybura; Reichenbach, 1854

Type species
- Trochilus buffonii Lesson, 1832

Species
- 2, see text

= Plumeleteer =

Chalybura

Genus of birds

The plumeleteers are a genus Chalybura of Neotropical hummingbirds in the family Trochilidae.

== Taxonomy ==
The genus Chalybura was introduced in 1854 by the German naturalist Ludwig Reichenbach. He listed three species in the new genus but did not specify the type species. In 1879 Daniel Giraud Elliot selected Trochilus buffoni Lesson, the white-vented plumeleteer, as the type. The genus name combines the Ancient Greek χαλυψ/khalups meaning "steel" with -ουρος/-ouros meaning "-tailed".

A phylogenetic study published in 2014 found the genus Chalybura containing the plumeleteers was sister to the genus Thalurania containing the woodnymphs.

The genus contains the following two species:

Image	Scientific name	Common name	Distribution
	Chalybura buffonii	White-vented plumeleteer	Colombia, Ecuador, Panama, Peru, and Venezuela
	Chalybura urochrysia	Bronze-tailed plumeleteer	eastern Honduras to northwestern Ecuador
