= F. C. R. Jourdain =

British amateur ornithologist and oologist

F. C. R. Jourdain M.A., F.Z.S., M.B.O.U.
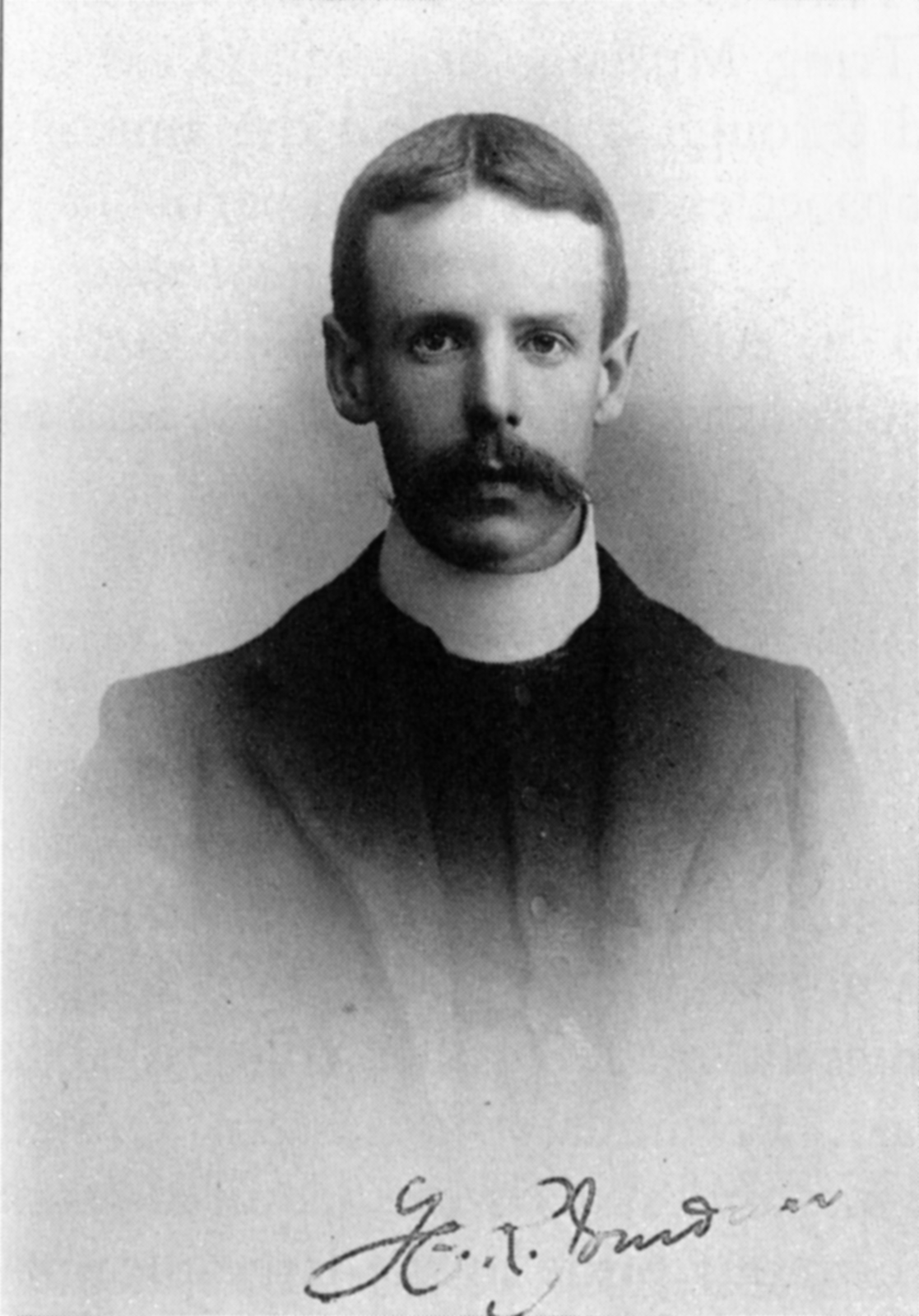
- Born: Francis Charles Robert Jourdain; 4 March 1865; Ashbourne, Derbyshire, UK
- Died: 27 February 1940 (aged 74); Southbourne, Bournemouth, Dorset, UK
- Education: Magdalen College, Oxford
- Occupation: Rector
- Known for: ornithology; oology; Jourdain Society

Francis Charles Robert Jourdain M.A., F.Z.S., M.B.O.U. (4 March 1865 – 27 February 1940), known as Rev. F. C. R. Jourdain, was a notable British amateur ornithologist and oologist. He was primarily known for his extensive research into the breeding biology of the birds of the Palaearctic region. He had interests in the food of British birds and their geographical distribution and strongly encouraged detailed and accurate record keeping in local ornithology. Known for his temper, he came be known by the nickname Pastor Pugnax. He was a founder of the British Oological Association, which changed its name after his death to the Jourdain Society in his memory.

== Early years ==
Jourdain was born in Ashbourne, Derbyshire, the eldest son of Rev. Francis Jourdain, vicar of Ashbourne-cum-Mapleton. He matriculated at Magdalen College, Oxford in 1883, he graduated B.A. in 1887. Ordained in 1890, he had two curacies in Suffolk, and then was appointed vicar of Clifton-by-Ashbourne in 1894. In 1914, he was appointed rector of Appleton, near Abingdon-on-Thames, where he stayed until he retired in 1925.

== Ornithology ==
He did not publish his first ornithological paper until 1899. From 1900 he went on an ornithological expedition abroad almost every year until his death, which resulted in a number of papers on the birds of the countries he visited. While at Appleton he actively encouraged ornithological study at Oxford University, welcoming interested students to his home. In 1922 he founded the Oxford Ornithological Society and was president until his retirement in 1925. This society led in later years to the formation of the British Trust for Ornithology and the Edward Grey Institute of Field Ornithology. He organized and led the 1921 Oxford University Spitsbergen expedition.

Jourdain produced several ornithological papers, although many were started but never finished, and authored or contributed to a number of books, notably the sections on Breeding-habits, Distribution Abroad and Food in the Handbook of British Birds (1938–41). He was assistant editor of British Birds, the "illustrated (monthly) magazine devoted to the birds on the British list", from 1909 onwards (until his death in 1940). He was also assistant editor of The Ibis from 1931 onwards and co-editor of The Oologists Record from 1935 onward.

He joined the British Ornithologists' Union in 1899, serving on the committee including as vice-President in 1934, joined the British Ornithologists' Club in 1905, was a member of the British List Committee for many years and was a founding member of the British Oological Association, of which he was president from 1932 to 1939. He was also a member of the International Ornithological Committee, an Honorary Fellow of the American Ornithologists' Union and an Honorary Member of the ornithological societies of France, Germany, Holland and Hungary.

He led the first Oxford University Expedition to Spitzbergen and travelled extensively in Europe and North Africa. He served as President of the Oxford Ornithological Society and was associated with many other ornithological bodies. Jourdain gained a reputation for his temper and went by the nickname of Pastor Pugnax. He retired in 1925, initially to Norfolk and then to Southbourne in Bournemouth two years later. He continued active field ornithology, writing and regularly attending ornithological gatherings right up until his death.

Jourdain died in Southbourne on 27 February 1940, aged 75.

== Publications ==
In addition to many ornithological papers, books he authored or coauthored include:

- Hartert, Ernst; Jourdain, F.C.R.; Ticehurst, N.F.; Witherby, H.F. (1912). A Hand-List of British Birds. London: H.F. & G. Witherby Ltd.
- Jourdain, F.C.R. (1906–1909). The Eggs of European Birds. London: R.H. Portet..online
- Kirkman, F. B.; Jourdain, F.C.R. (1930). British Birds. Nelson & Jack.
- Witherby, H.F.; Jourdain, F.C.R.; Ticehurst, Norman F.; & Tucker, Bernard W. (1938–1941). The Handbook of British Birds. Vols.1–5. H.F. & G. Witherby Ltd: London.

== Expeditions ==
- 1900 North Brabant, Netherlands
- 1901 North Holland (and Texel)
- 1902 Netherlands
- 1903 Jutland
- 1904 Netherlands
- 1905/06/07 Southern Spain
- 1907 Morocco
- 1908/09 Corsica
- 1910/11 Dobrogea, E. Rumania
- 1912 S.W. Iceland
- 1913/14 Eastern Algeria
- 1915/19 Southern Spain
- 1920 Morocco
- 1921/22 Norway and Spitzbergen
- 1923 Netherlands, Haute Savoie and Switzerland
- 1924 Norway and Finland
- 1925 Tunisia and the Camargue
- 1926 Tunisia, Netherlands and Denmark
- 1927 Algeria
- 1928 Algeria and Marocco
- 1929 Cyprus
- 1930 Balearic Islands and the Netherlands
- 1931 Cyprus and Palestine
- 1932 Scotland
- 1933 Switzerland and Haute Savoie
- 1934 Wales
- 1935 Egypt and Palestine
- 1936 Hungary
- 1937 Corsica
- 1938 France
- 1939 Scotland and Shetland

== Sources ==
- Manuscript and Drawing Collection of Francis Charles Robert Jourdain (1865–1940). A Collection Description. Natural History Museum: London.
- Tucker, B.W., 1940. Francis Charles Robert Jourdain: An Appreciation. The Ibis. 1940. 504–518
- Witherby, H.F., 1940. Obituary: The Rev. F. C. R. Jourdain. (1865–1940). British Birds, 33(11), pp. 286–293
