= Bernard Tucker =

English ornithologist

- Born: 22 January 1901; Northaw, Hertfordshire
- Died: 19 December 1950 (aged 49)
- Education: Harrow School, Magdalen College, Oxford
- Scientific career
- Fields: Ornithology
- Workplaces: Zoological Station, Naples; Zoological Laboratory, Cambridge; Oxford University.

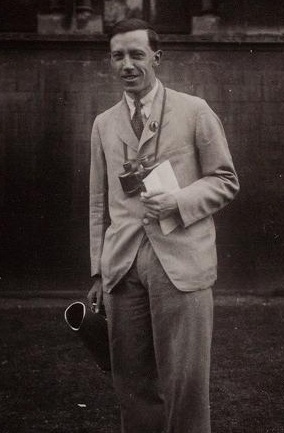
Tucker in 1934, photographed by Alexander Wetmore during the 8th International Ornithological Congress for which Tucker served as treasurer and secretary of the reception committee

Bernard William Tucker (22 January 1901 – 19 December 1950) was an English ornithologist. He was lecturer in zoology at Oxford University, a long-time editor of the magazine British Birds, and one of the authors of The Handbook of British Birds. He was the first Treasurer of the British Trust for Ornithology (BTO) and founder of the Oxford Ornithological Society in 1921.

Tucker was born at Northaw, Hertfordshire, to William and Constance Susan Tucker. He was educated at Harrow School and Magdalen College, Oxford, gaining first class honours in 1923. He took an interest in birds even as a young boy. He spent 1924 at the Zoological Station in Naples investigating parasitism in crustaceans. In 1925 he was appointed Demonstrator in the Zoological Laboratory, Cambridge. In 1926 he became Demonstrator in Zoology and Comparative Anatomy at Oxford University. In 1946 he became the first person to be appointed as a reader in ornithology in a British university. Tucker, along with Max Nicholson, played a key role in leading the collaborative Oxford Bird Census in 1927. According to Nicholson and J. D. Witherby in their obituary, Tucker was "the least dramatic of men, but he did much to bring about a revolution in ornithology and to guard it against the reaction which awaits a revolution if it goes too far and too fast".

During his stint in Naples he met Gladys Allen whom he married on 11 July 1925.

A subspecies of the Bornean treepie was named after him as Dendrocitta sinensis tuckeri by Tom Harrisson and C. H. Hartley in 1934, but this is no longer considered a valid subspecies. The BTO awards a Bernard Tucker Medal in his memory.
