= Jourdain Society =

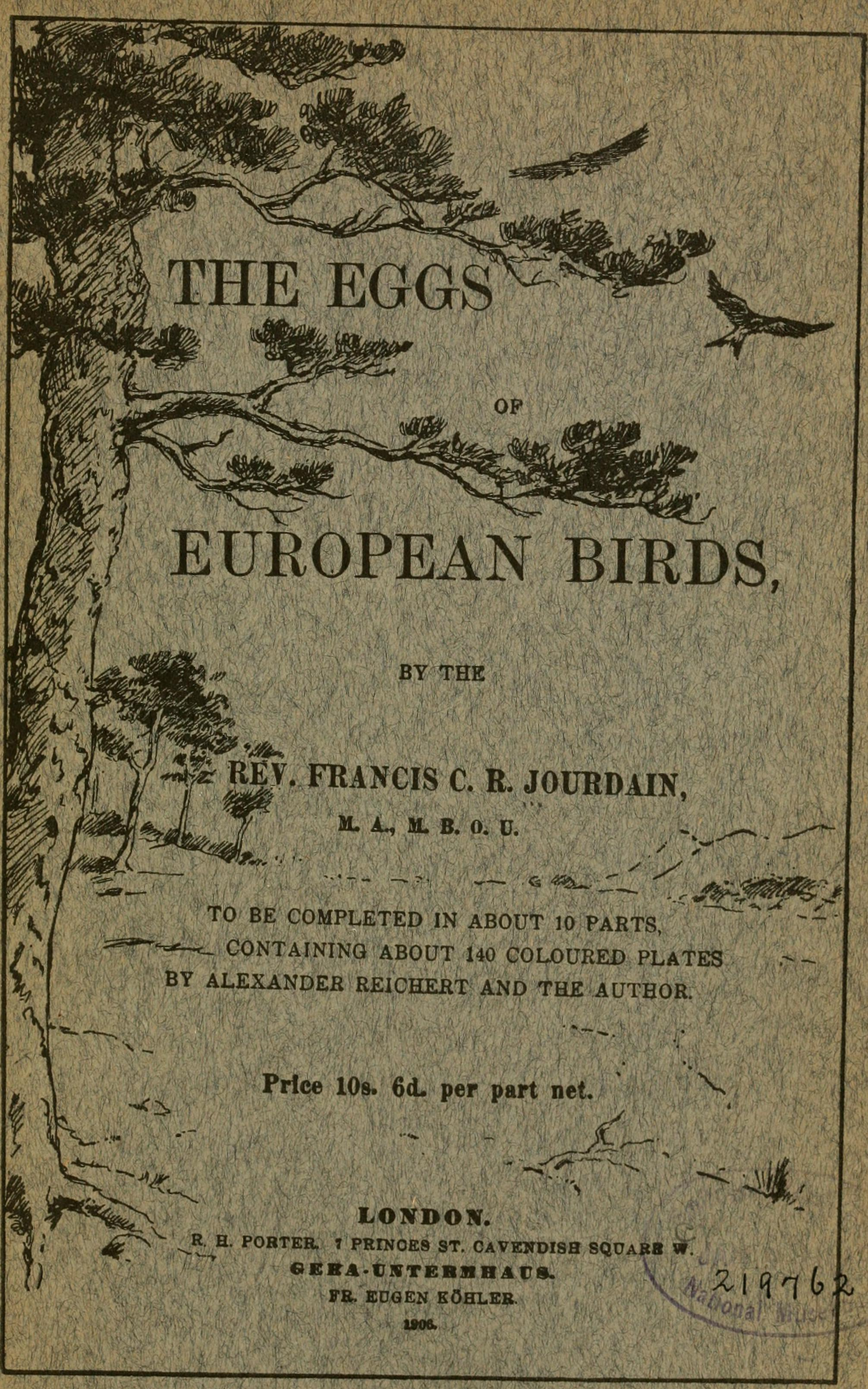
The front cover of The Eggs of European Birds, a 1906 book by Jourdain

The Jourdain Society is or was a controversial society based in the United Kingdom, its aims being "the advancement of the science of oology", the collection and study of intact birds' eggs. Established in 1922 as the British Oological Association, it changed its name in 1946 in memory of distinguished ornithologist and oologist Reverend Francis Jourdain (1865–1940). The society was a social gathering that held regular dinners, established as an elitist club, which did not admit women and professional dealers.

Egg-collecting is the removal of intact, unhatched eggs from a birds' nest, followed by drilling out the contents to keep the egg intact. It was considered a respectable leisure pursuit in the nineteenth and early twentieth century, at a time when conservation, study and hunting were not seen as opposed activities. However the activity became extremely controversial after conservationists concluded that the taking of rare birds' eggs was a major factor in their extinction and endangerment, and that the activity lacked real scientific value. Jourdain co-founded the society after being offended by early criticism of the practice.

In 1954, the collection of new eggs from nests was made illegal by the Protection of Birds Act, and from this point the society was widely believed to act as an information exchange for a hard core of egg-takers and their customers.

Its membership of often wealthy collectors was monitored by the RSPB and several times raided by police. A significant event occurred in July 1994 when the society's dinner at a hotel in Salisbury was raided by police. A number of collections on display were seized, totalling 11,000 wild birds' eggs. Six members of the society were convicted.

The society at one stage held charitable status but later ceased holding this. Records from the Charity Commission for England and Wales indicate it ceased to exist as a charity in 2001.

Members claimed in 1994 that the society expelled members with convictions and in 1998 that the society was composed of "first-class field naturalists who carefully study breeding habits".
