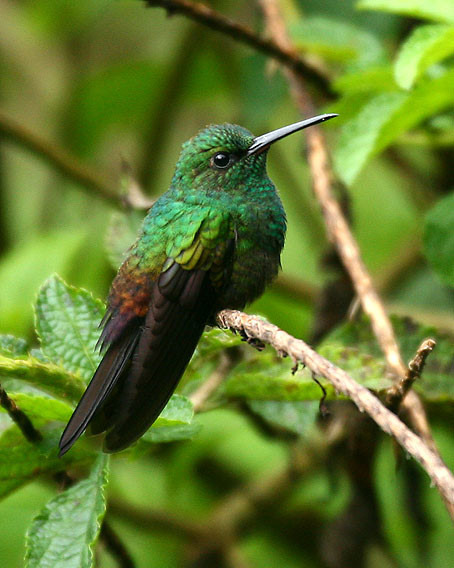

Conservation status
- Least Concern (IUCN 3.1)
- CITES Appendix II

Scientific classification
- Kingdom: Animalia
- Phylum: Chordata
- Class: Aves
- Order: Apodiformes
- Family: Trochilidae
- Genus: Chalybura
- Species: C. urochrysia

Binomial name
- Chalybura urochrysia (Gould, 1861)
- Range of Chalybura urochrysia

= Bronze-tailed plumeleteer =

Species of hummingbird

The bronze-tailed plumeleteer (Chalybura urochrysia) is a species of hummingbird in the "emeralds", tribe Trochilini of subfamily Trochilinae. It is found in Colombia, Costa Rica, Ecuador, Nicaragua, and Panama.

== Taxonomy ==
The bronze-tailed plumeleteer was formally described and illustrated in 1861 by the English ornithologist John Gould based on a specimen that had been supplied by the Polish collector Józef Warszewicz. Gould coined the binomial name Hypuroptila urochrysia but mistakenly gave the locality as the "neighbourhood of Panama". The locality has been redesignated as western Columbia. The bronze-tailed plumeleteer is now placed with the white-vented plumeleteer in the genus Chalybura that was introduced in 1854 by Ludwig Reichenbach. The genus name combines the Ancient Greek χαλυψ/khalups, χαλυβος/khalubos meaning "steel" with ουρα/oura meaning "tail". The specific epithet combines the Ancient Greek ουρα/oura meaning "tail" with χρυσεος/khruseos meaning "golden".

Three subspecies are recognised:

- C. u. melanorrhoa Salvin, 1865 – Nicaragua and Costa Rica
- C. u. isaurae (Gould, 1861) – east, west Panama and northwest Colombia
- C. u. urochrysia (Gould, 1861) – southeast Panama, central north, west Colombia to northwest Ecuador

Most taxonomic systems assign three subspecies to the bronze-tailed plumeleteer, the nominate C. u. urochrysia, C. u. melanorrhoa, and C. u. isaurae. However, BirdLife International's Handbook of the Birds of the World (HBW) adds C. u. intermedia, which the others treat as a subspecies of the white-vented plumeleteer (C. buffonii). Subspecies melanorrhoa and isaurae have at times been suggested as separate species.

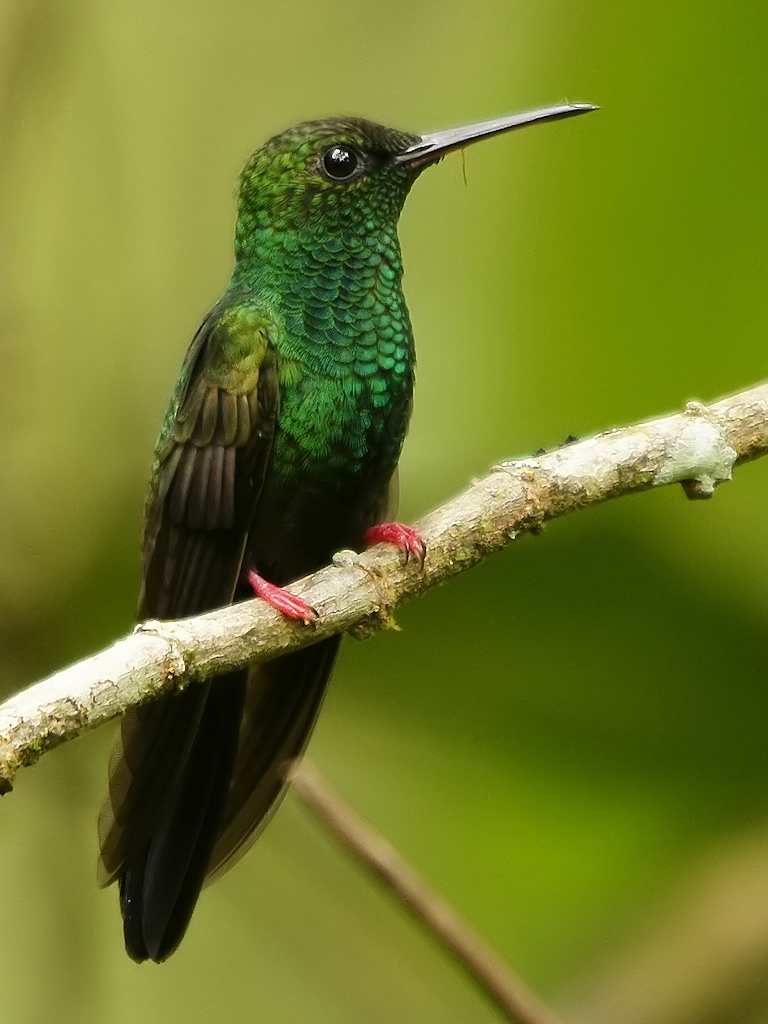
"Red-footed" plumeleteer, C. u. melanorrhoa

== Description ==
The bronze-tailed plumeleteer is 10.5 to 12 cm (4.1 to 4.7 in) long. Males weigh about 7.1 g (0.25 oz) and females about 6.1 g (0.22 oz). Both sexes of all subspecies have a black maxilla and tip of the mandible; the rest of the mandible is dull pink to dark red. Males of the nominate subspecies have metallic green upperparts and glittering green underparts, with long fluffy white undertail coverts. Their tails are bronze-green. Females are also metallic green above but gray below with green flecks on the side. Their undertail coverts are grayish white and their outer tail feathers tipped with gray. Immature birds resemble the adults with buffy to cinnamon fringing on the feathers of the crown, nape, and rump.

Males of subspecies C. u. melanorrhoa have darker green upperparts than the nominate, with purplish bronze uppertail coverts. Their underparts are darker with a dusky bronze belly and shorter, sooty blackish, undertail coverts. Their tail is purplish black. Females are a darker gray below than the nominate and have more green flecking. Males of subspecies C. u. isaurae have a blue throat and breast, a bluish green belly, and a brighter bronze tail than the nominate. Females have pale gray underparts with little or no green flecks.

== Distribution and habitat ==
Subspecies C. u. melanorrhoa of the bronze-tailed plumeleteer is the northernmost. It is found from eastern Nicaragua into Costa Rica and has a few records in eastern Honduras. C. u. isaurae is found on the Caribbean slope and locally on the Pacific slope of Panama and into extreme northwestern Colombia. The nominate is found from eastern Panama's Darién Province through north-central and western Colombia into northwestern Ecuador. The species inhabits the interior and edges of humid forest, mature secondary forest, and semi-open landscapes such as banana plantations and gardens. It shuns open areas. In elevation, it ranges from sea level to 700 m (2,300 ft) in Costa Rica and up to 900 m (3,000 ft) in Colombia.

(Note that the map includes the southwestern Ecuador range of the intermedia subspecies of white-vented plumeleteer.)

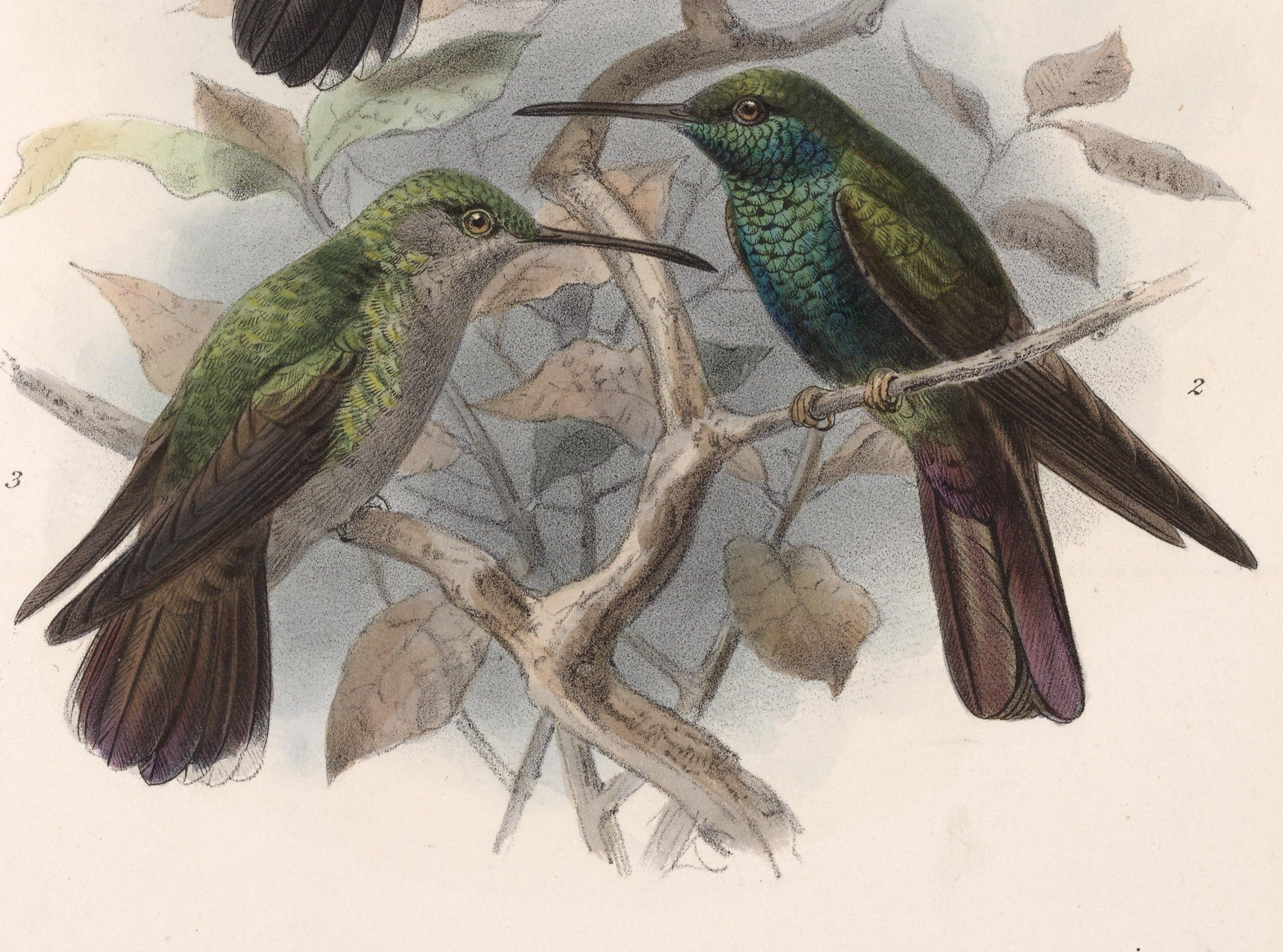
Illustration by John Gerrard Keulemans (1902)

== Behavior ==
=== Movement ===
Subspecies C. u. melanorrhoa of bronze-tailed plumeleteer is known to make local seasonal movements, probably to find flowering plants. Movements of the other two subspecies, if any, are not known.

=== Feeding ===
The bronze-tailed plumeleteer mostly forages for nectar from the understory to the mid-strata, but will visit epiphytes in the sub-canopy. It especially favors Heliconia and aggressively defends patches of them and other rich nectar sources. It has also been documented to feed on Renealmia, Costus, Psychotria, Malvaviscus, Acanthaceae, Inga, and others. In addition to nectar, it captures small arthropods mainly by hawking from a perch but also by gleaning from foliage.

=== Breeding ===
The bronze-tailed plumeleteer breeds in Costa Rica between December and June, though mostly from February to April. In Colombia, it also appears to breed between February and April. Its nest is best known from Costa Rica; there it makes a deep cup nest of pale plant down and fibers bound with spiderweb and covered on the outside with moss and some lichen. It typically places it in a shrub about 0.5 to 1.5 m (2 to 5 ft) above the ground, often near a stream or trail.

=== Vocalization ===
What is thought to be the bronze-tailed plumeleteer's song is "a soft, nasal, scratchy, trilled phrase, ter-twee-ee-ee-ee-ee....ter-twee-ee-ee...". It makes "a drawn-out descending chattering trill" when chasing and also "loud chup and chip notes".

== Status ==
The International Union for Conservation of Nature follows HBW taxonomy and so includes the intermedia subspecies of white-vented plumeleteer with this species. It has assessed the bronze-tailed plumeleteer as being of Least Concern, though its population size is not known and is believed to be decreasing. Much of its habitat has been destroyed in Central America but it is still locally common at many sites.
