= Claud B. Ticehurst =

British ornithologist

Claud Buchanan Ticehurst FRGS
- Born: 8 January 1881; St Leonards-on-Sea, Sussex, England
- Died: 17 February 1941 (aged 60)
- Education: Tonbridge School
- Alma mater: St John's College, Cambridge
- Occupation: Surgeon
- Relatives: Norman Frederick Ticehurst (brother)

Claud Buchanan Ticehurst FRGS (8 January 1881 – 17 February 1941) was a British ornithologist.

== Early years ==
Born at St Leonards-on-Sea, Sussex he was a brother of Norman Frederic Ticehurst (1873-1960) and their father was Dr. A. R. Ticehurst. Ticehurst received early education at a preparatory school and then went to Tonbridge School (1892-1900) and subsequently attended St John's College, Cambridge, receiving a Bachelor of Arts in 1903.

== Career ==
Following the family tradition he trained as a medical physician, receiving an MRCS and LRCP from Guy's Hospital. In 1910 he worked at Lowestoft as a doctor while also being a surgeon at the North Suffolk Hospital. In 1917 he joined as a Temporary Lieutenant in the RAMC where he was promoted to a Temporary Captain on 5 June 1918. He was posted to India but stopped at Sierra Leone and South Africa. He served in British India, mainly in Karachi but with visits to Basra and Quetta from 23 September 1917 to 14 January 1920, a period when he became a friend of Hugh Whistler who shared an interest in ornithology. He married Mary Priscilla on 18 January 1923.

== Ornithology ==
As a child he had been introduced to birds by his father who took the boys to Norway during summer. He was elected to the British Ornithologists' Union in 1903 and while at Cambridge he was influenced by Alfred Newton. During his posting in Karachi, he took an interest in the birds of the region. After retirement he once again took a keen interest in the collection of birds, and made trips to Spain, Yugoslavia, Portugal and Algeria and was sometimes accompanied by John Lewis James Bonhote and Hugh Whistler for this purpose.

He was working on a comprehensive publication regarding this topic with Hugh Whistler when he died in 1941. With Whistler's own passing two years later, the book was never published. His collection of 10,000 bird skins was bequeathed to the Natural History Museum.

== Bibliography ==
Some of his major works included:

- A History of the Birds of Suffolk, 1932
- A Systematic review of the genus Phylloscopus, 1938
- 1928. On the avifauna of Galicia, N.W. Spain. Ibis, 1928, pp. 663–683. (With H. Whistler.)
- 1902. An account of the birds met with during a short stay in East Finmark. Zoologist:261-277. (With his brother)
