= Ernst Hartert =

German ornithologist (1859–1933)

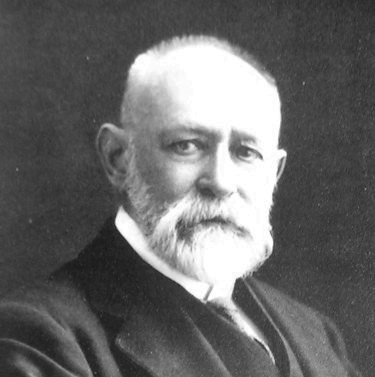
- Born: 29 October 1859; Free and Hanseatic City of Hamburg
- Died: 11 November 1933 (aged 74); Berlin, Germany
- Known for: Hand-List of British Birds
- Spouse: Claudia Bernadine Elisabeth Hartert
- Children: One son
- Scientific career
- Fields: Ornithologist
- Institutions: Natural History Museum at Tring
- Patrons: Walter Rothschild, 2nd Baron Rothschild
- Author abbrev. (zoology): Hartert

Ernst Johann Otto Hartert (29 October 1859 – 11 November 1933) was a widely published German ornithologist.

== Life and career ==
Hartert was born in the Free and Hanseatic City of Hamburg on 29 October 1859. In July 1891, he married the illustrator Claudia Bernadine Elisabeth Hartert in Frankfurt am Main, Germany, with whom he had a son named Joachim Karl (Charles) Hartert, (1893–1916), who was killed as an English soldier on the Somme.

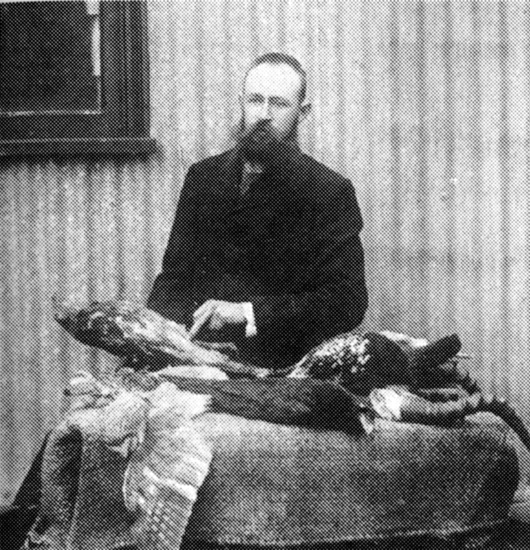

Together with his wife, he was the first to describe the blue-tailed Buffon hummingbird subspecies (Chalybura buffonii intermedia Hartert, E & Hartert, C, 1894). The article On a collection of Humming Birds from Ecuador and Mexico appears to be their only joint publication.

Hartert was employed by Walter Rothschild, 2nd Baron Rothschild as ornithological curator of Rothshild's private Natural History Museum at Tring, in England from 1892 to 1929.

Hartert published the quarterly museum periodical Novitates Zoologicae (1894–39) with Rothschild, and the Hand-List of British Birds (1912) with Francis Charles Robert Jourdain, Norman Frederick Ticehurst and Harry Forbes Witherby. He wrote Die Vögel der paläarktischen Fauna (1910–22) and travelled in India, Africa, and South America on behalf of his employer. Although Hartert supported the conservation of some species of birds, he wrote a pamphlet in 1900 in which he supported the control of house sparrows.

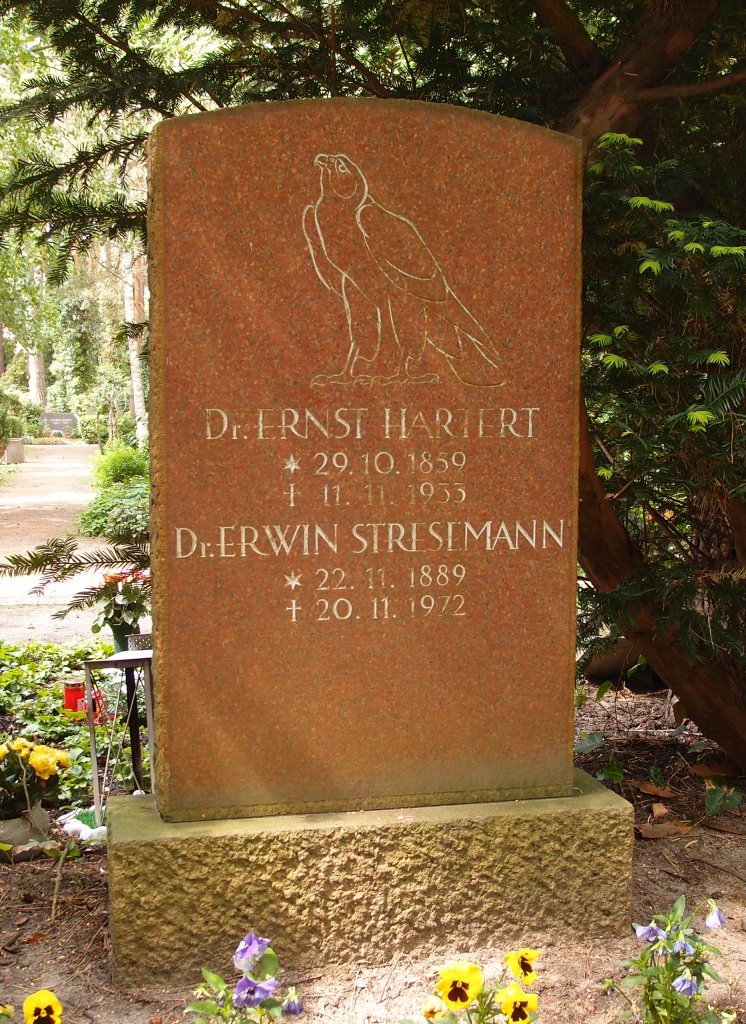
Grave of Ernst Hartert in Waldfriedhof Dahlem, Berlin

In 1930, Hartert retired to Berlin, where he died in 1933.

Hartert had been a mentor to Erwin Stresemann, whose cremated remains were interred at Hartert's grave in 1972.

== Works ==
Among the written publications of Ernst Hartert are:

- (1891). Katalog der Vogelsammlung im Museum der Senckenbergischen Naturforschenden Gesellschaft in Frankfurt am Main.
- (1897). Podargidae, Caprimulgidae und Macropterygidae.
- (1897). Das Tierreich.
- (1900). Trochilidae.
- (1902). Aus den Wanderjahren eines Naturforschers: Reisen und Forschungen in Afrika, Asien und Amerika, nebst daran anknüpfenden, meist ornithologischen Studien.
- (1903). Ueber die Pipriden-Gattung Masius Bp.
- (1910–1922). Die Vögel der paläarktischen Fauna: Systematische Übersicht der in Europa, Nord-asien und der Mittelmeerregion vorkommenden Vögel. Three volumes.
- Hartert, Ernst; Jourdain, F.C.R.; Ticehurst, N.F.; Witherby, H.F. (1912). A Hand-List of British Birds, with an account of the distribution of each species in the British Isles and abroad. London: Witherby & Co. OCLC 70467193.
- (1920). Die Vögel Europas.

== Eponyms ==
A species of lizard, Hemiphyllodactylus harterti, and 12 birds are named in his honor.

== See also ==
- Category:Taxa named by Ernst Hartert

== Sources ==
- Rothschild, L.W. (1934). "Ernst Johann Otto Hartert (1859–1933): An Appreciation". Ibis. 76 (2): 350–377 (+ plates IX & X). doi:10.1111/j.1474-919X.1934.tb01573.x.
