= Harry Forbes Witherby =

British ornithologist, author, publisher and editor

Harry Forbes Witherby MBE, FZS, MBOU
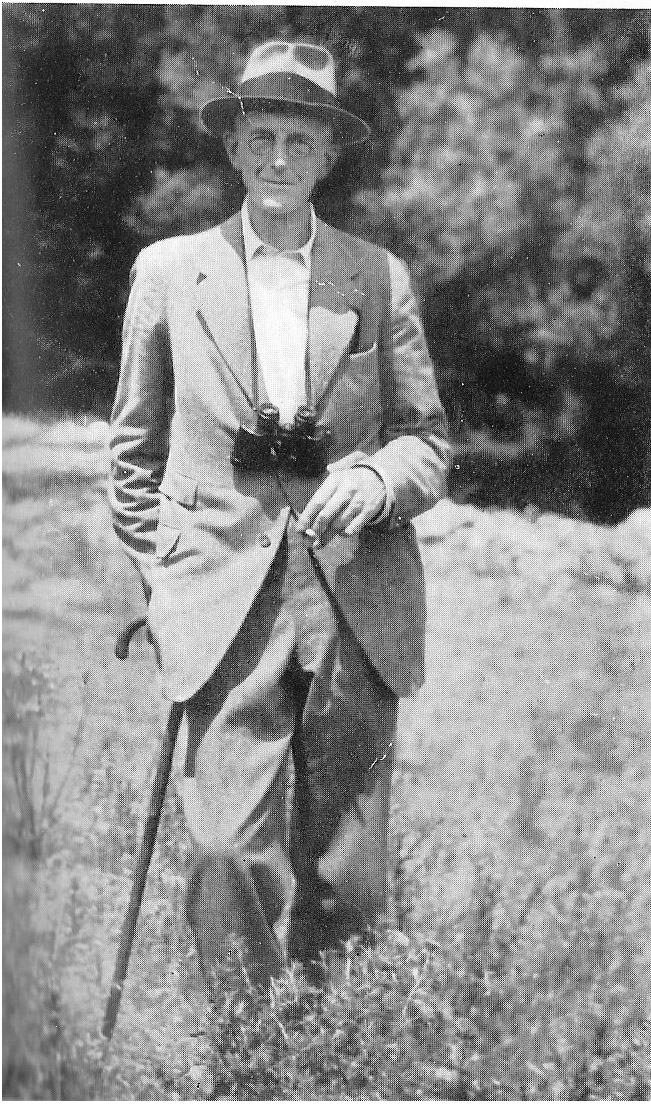
- Witherby in 1937
- Born: 7 October 1873
- Died: 11 December 1943 (aged 70); Gracious Pond Farm, Chobham, Surrey
- Occupation: Publisher
- Known for: Ornithology, publishing
- Notable work: British Birds magazine; The Handbook of British Birds
- Spouse: Lilian Gillson (m. 1904)
- Parent: Henry Forbes Witherby
- Relatives: five children: two sons and three daughters

Harry Forbes Witherby, MBE, FZS, MBOU (7 October 1873 – 11 December 1943) was a British ornithologist, author, publisher and founding editor (in 1907) of the magazine British Birds.

== Personal life ==
Harry was the second surviving son of Henry Forbes Witherby (1836–1907) of Holmehurst, Burley, Hants, the owner of the legal and maritime stationer Witherby and Co., employing 169 men who retired from the family business in 1899 to focus on his interests in painting and ornithology, leaving it to be run by his sons. After leaving school Witherby entered his old family publishing firm of Witherby, from which he retired in 1936, but resumed work again after the outbreak of the second world war. The family firm of H F and G Witherby, originally printers, began to publish bird books early in the 20th century. From an early age Witherby devoted himself to the study of ornithology, travelling extensively, including visits to Iran, the Kola Peninsula, and the White Nile. He described the latter in his book Bird Hunting on the White Nile (1902). He married Lilian Gillson in 1904. Lilian joined him on his travels and even learnt to skin birds on their honeymoon. They had two sons and three daughters.

== Career ==
He started one of the world's first two bird ringing schemes in 1909 (they merged in the late 1930s), transferring responsibility, in 1937, to the British Trust for Ornithology (BTO), who continue to run it. Witherby was Hon Secretary and Treasurer (1904–14), and Chairman (1924–27) of the British Ornithologists' Club (1924–1927) and President of the Council of the British Ornithologists' Union (BOU) (1933–1938). In 1933 he was one of eleven people, (Note: The letter was signed: Desborough; Hugh S. Gladstone; Grey of Fallodon; Julian S. Huxley (Chancellor of Oxford University); T. G Longstaff; Percy R. Lowe; P. Chalmers Mitchell; Rothschild; Scone M.P. (Chairman, British Trust for Ornithology); E. L. Turner; H. F. Witherby (President, British Ornithologists' Union)) involved in the appeal that led to the foundation of the British Trust for Ornithology (BTO), an organisation for the study of birds in the British Isles., becoming a founding member and early vice-chairman. The BTO survived through his financial generosity, not least in donating the proceeds of the sale of his extensive collection of stuffed birds to the British Museum - this is now at the Natural History Museum, Tring.

Witherby's crowning glory was The Handbook of British Birds (1938–1941). Spanning five volumes, it was reprinted a number of times, the later editions having a few pages devoted to corrections and additions to previous editions, but few of these are of great significance and the main text was left untouched. He was made an Honorary Fellow of the American Ornithologists' Union in 1928 and was awarded the Godman-Salvin Medal by the BOU in 1937. Witherby's lark (Alaemon hamertoni) was named for him, in 1905, but is now more commonly known as the lesser hoopoe-lark. Two other bird sub-species have been named after him: Emberiza schoeniclus witherbyi (common reed bunting) and Erithacus rubecula witherbyi (European robin).

During World War I he was a lieutenant in the Royal Navy Volunteer Reserve. He was mentioned in dispatches and was awarded the Military MBE for his service as an intelligence officer in Dunkirk.

== See also ==
- Witherby Memorial Lecture
