= Egg Collecting and Bird Life of Australia =

Book by Sidney William Jackson

Egg collecting and bird life of Australia
- Title page for Egg Collecting and Bird Life of Australia (1907)
- Author: S.W. Jackson
- Illustrator: S.W. Jackson
- Language: English
- Subject: Australian birds' eggs
- Genre: Catalogue
- Publisher: Printed for the author by F.W. White, Sydney
- Publication date: 1907
- Publication place: Australia
- Media type: Print

Egg collecting and bird life of Australia is a quarto-sized book authored and published in 1907 by field ornithologist and oologist Sidney William Jackson. The full title text reads: "Egg collecting and bird life of Australia. Catalogue and data of the "Jacksonian oological collection", illustrated with numerous photographs depicting various incidents and items in connection with this interesting study, which has been the life work of the Author."

== Description ==
The book is essentially a 171-page catalogue of the collection of nearly 2000 eggs, representing over 500 species of Australian birds, accumulated by Jackson from his boyhood until his early thirties. Many he collected personally, especially in the area within reach of Grafton, north-eastern New South Wales, then containing large areas of subtropical rainforest, with others from further afield being acquired through correspondence. The inclusion of numerous anecdotes about how the eggs he collected personally were obtained, with notes on the birds and their habitats as well as the many photographs of people and activities related to the collecting, add autobiographical and historical dimensions to the work.

The author says in his preface:

The Collection which is described in this Volume, is the result of twenty-four years continuous work, as I commenced it in the year 1883; and a clutch taken in that year (Data No.216) may be considered as the nucleus of the enterprise. In the early days of the collecting, I had little idea of the magnitude it would eventually assume, but, looking back over the years, a fund of pleasant memories and fascinating experiences more than counterbalances the endless patience and perseverance, the many disappointments, and the solid hard work which were necessary to bring it to its present condition.

Exemplifying both Jackson's prose style and his approach to his work, the following extract (omitting references to other works and illustrations) is from his coverage of the rufous scrub-bird Atrichornis rufescens – then Atrichia rufescens:

This set of eggs is the only one known to science, and its discovery was the means of putting in the "keystone" to the oological arch in Australia. It is the first discovered, and still remains so. So the missing link has at last been found. During my visit to the scrubs of the rich Don Dorrigo country, in the Upper Bellenger River district of New South Wales, in October of 1898, I had some most interesting experiences, and paid special attention to the Atrichia during my stay, and was particularly bent on finding its nest and eggs, and lost no opportunities of following it whenever I heard its very shrill and penetrating note. They are exceedingly shy birds, and hide very suddenly, and like a mouse they crawl under some big log, or into a mass of dead leaves, sticks, and bushes, and thus dodge a person beautifully. They frequent parts of the scrub where it is damp and dense, and almost impossible for a man to get through, and appear to be quite terrestrial in their habits. On October 20, of 1898, a party consisting of four, including myself, left camp at 8 a.m., after enjoying a good breakfast of damper and curried Wonga Pigeon. We then entered the scrub at about 600 yards from the camp, when almost immediately we heard the noisy Spine-tailed Orthonyxes crying out in all parts. Suddenly one flew from a nest which was built at the foot of a tree. About three feet from this nest was a tuft of long green stiff grass (Cyperaceae sp.), out of which immediately after the Orthonyx flew the Atrichia. We all rushed over, and found it contained two fresh eggs, and there was no doubt about them being those of the Atrichia, considering we all saw the bird fly from the nest. We then lay down concealed in the ferns and undergrowth, in the scrub, for nearly four hours, with gun ready, waiting for the return of Mrs. Atrichia, but it was all for nothing, not the slightest sight of the bird being obtained. It seems very remarkable that the female Atrichia has not yet been captured; all specimens so far obtained have been males, with the exception of one, which was caught at the nest at Booyong, near Lismore, N.S.W., and a description of which I will give in this data. I shot eleven at various times, and when I have dropped across them in pairs, yet on dissection they all proved to be male birds.

In 1906 Jackson sold his collection to H.L. White, a wealthy pastoralist of "Belltrees", an extensive grazing property near Scone, New South Wales, who had financed the publication of Jackson's catalogue. Not only did Jackson's collection form a key part of the H. L. White Collection, but in 1907 White employed Jackson as curator of the collection as well as a collector whom he sent on several quests around Australia to further expand it. Jackson remained in White's employment until White's death in 1927 when the egg collection passed to the National Museum of Victoria in Melbourne.

== Sources ==
- Jackson, S.W. (1907). Egg Collecting and Bird Life of Australia. Catalogue and Data of the Jacksonian Oological Collection. Sydney: F.W. White, for the author.

== General references ==
- Anon (1908). "Review of 'Catalogue and Data of the Jacksonian Oological Collection'". Emu. 7 (4): 201–205. doi:10.1071/MU907194.
- Egg collecting and bird life of Australia. Biodiversity Heritage Library(BHL).
- Robin, Libby (2001). The Flight of the Emu. Melbourne: Melbourne University Press.
- Whittell, Hubert Massey (1954). The Literature of Australian Birds: A History and a Bibliography of Australian Ornithology (PDF). Perth: Paterson Brokensha. pp. 369–370. LCCN 56000760. OCLC 2851290. OL 6194318M. Wikidata Q7747557.
