= Weenen (disambiguation) =

Weenen is a settlement in KwaZulu-Natal, South Africa.

Weenen may also refer to:

- Weenen massacre, a massacre of Voortrekkers by the Zulu
- Weenen-Kliprivier Commando, a regiment of the South African Army
- Edward van Weenen (1847–1925), an Australian philatelist
- John van Weenen (born 1941), an 8th Dan karateka and humanitarian
