= Sidney William Jackson =

Australian naturalist (1873–1946)

Sidney William Jackson (12 June 1873 – 30 September 1946) was an Australian naturalist and field ornithologist with a special interest in oology, who was also a skilled photographer and taxidermist.

== History ==
Jackson was born in Brisbane, Queensland, and received his education at Toowoomba Grammar School before further studies in Grafton, New South Wales. His passion for birds and egg collecting developed during his youth.

Based in Grafton, Jackson worked as a commercial traveller, a profession that provided him with opportunities to amass a significant collection of birds' eggs. While his primary focus was on bird and egg specimens, he also collected land snails and botanical specimens. Jackson, along with his brother Frank, developed innovative techniques for tree climbing, employing leg-spikes and rope-ladders to aid in egg collection.

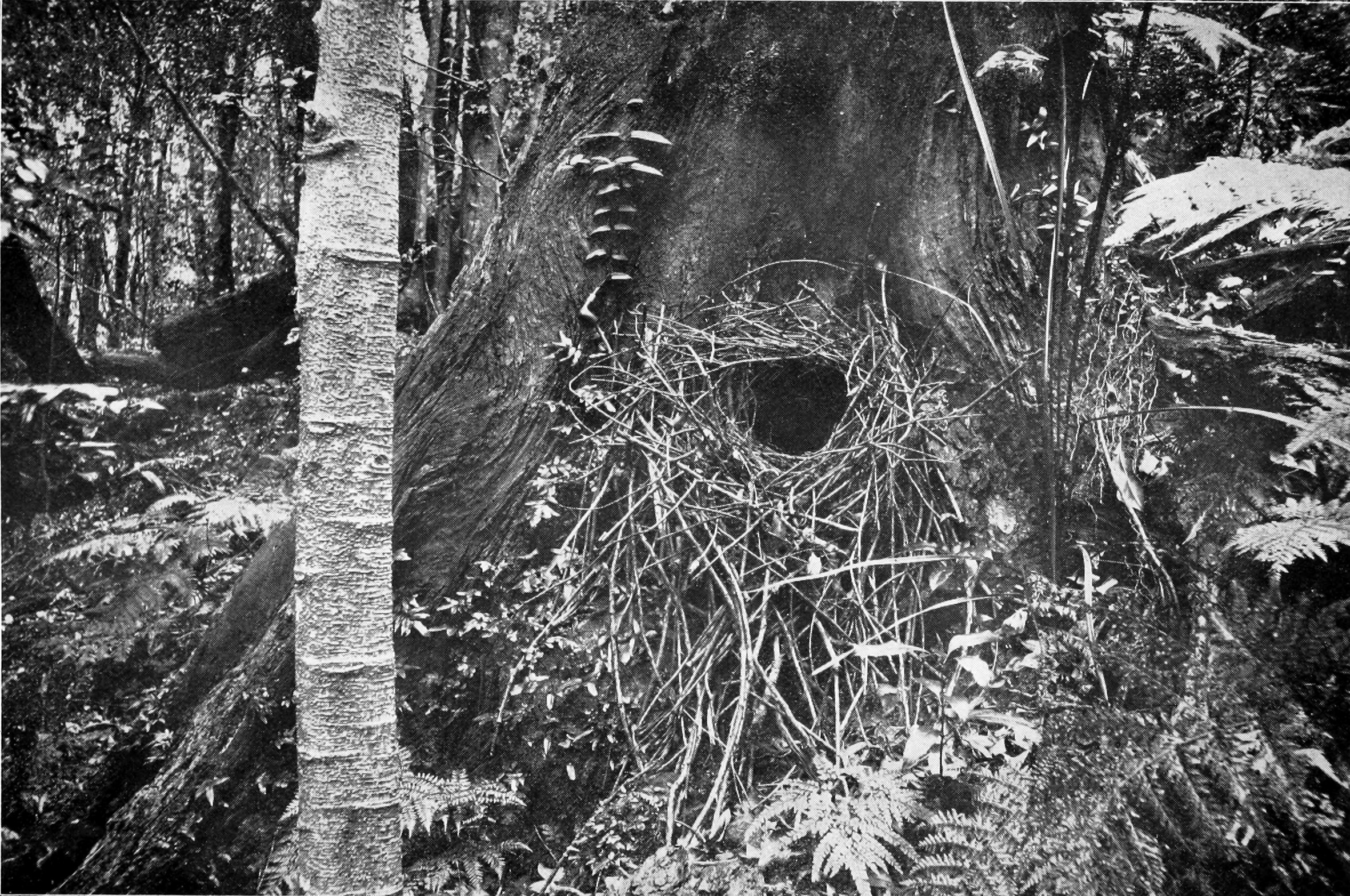
Nest of a lyre-bird by Jackson

Jackson contributed several papers to the RAOU journal The Emu. He was a diligent diarist, correspondent, photographer and talented sketcher, whose diaries, as well as much of his correspondence, photographic negatives and drawings, eventually found their way to the National Library of Australia in Canberra. He also authored a book, Egg Collecting and Bird Life of Australia, a combined autobiographical work and oological catalogue, illustrated with his own photographs, which was published in 1907.

In 1906 Jackson had sold his collection of nearly 2000 eggs, representing over 500 species of Australian birds, to H.L. White, a wealthy pastoralist based at Scone, New South Wales who was a keen amateur ornithologist and oologist. In 1907 White then employed Jackson as curator of his collection of eggs and bird skins, as well as a collector of further specimens. During this period Jackson travelled extensively throughout Australia on quests to obtain specimens and eggs of various birds. Following White's death in 1927, Jackson moved to Sydney where he wrote popular illustrated articles on natural history for newspapers and magazines, mainly the Sydney Morning Herald and the World's News, using the pen name Ajax.

Ornithological historian Alec Chisholm, in an article about Jackson's diaries in The Emu, described Jackson, whom he knew personally, as follows:

Inevitably, the diaries and correspondence reflect the character of their author. Jackson was an odd mixture. A keen observer and most diligent worker, he was extremely temperamental – apt to be completely downcast at one moment and thoroughly joyful soon afterwards. In some respects he was entirely humourless, and yet he could be highly entertaining when giving performances of ventriloquism and mimicry, added to which he had a child-like fondness for those trivial gadgets (such as a piece of tin shaped and painted to resemble spilt ink) that alarm or embarrass unwary people. Practical and self-reliant in the bush, he was just the reverse in matters of business, and so he was frequently in trouble, financial and otherwise. The one factor that sustained him during tribulations, and also caused him to exaggerate his own achievements, was a strong strain of egotism. This failing, if occasionally provoking, was quite naive in his case, and so was tolerated by all who knew him well – H. L. White included – though they regretted to see it leading him, at times, into childish absurdities. Inevitably, the same weakness is manifest in every diary and almost every letter of the collection now at Canberra, and in some instances the remarks are distinctly quaint.

The fact appears to be that Jackson, through experiencing much solitude in the bush, had become lonely and introspective, and so took to indulging in self-pity and self-congratulation. Like various other bush-wanderers before his time, he 'talked' to his diaries, and, even though we may smile at certain comments, it has to be conceded that such highly personal touches make the entries more 'human' than matter-of-fact narratives.

— Alexander Hugh Chisholm

== Legacy ==
Eucalyptus jacksonii was named in honour of Jackson.
