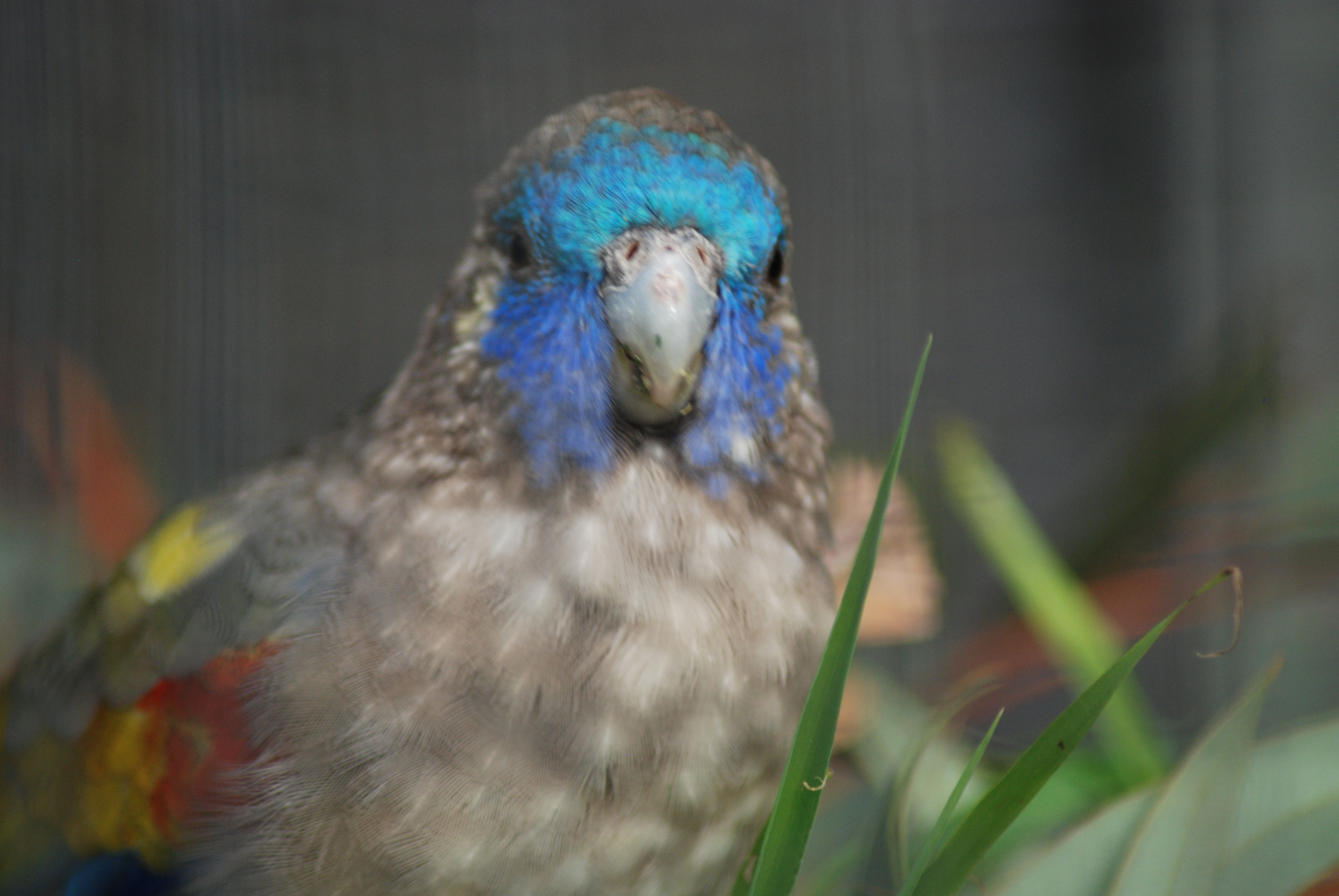
- Naretha Bluebonnet

Scientific classification
- Kingdom: Animalia
- Phylum: Chordata
- Class: Aves
- Order: Psittaciformes
- Family: Psittaculidae
- Genus: Northiella
- Species: N. narethae

Binomial name
- Northiella narethae (White, HL, 1921)

= Naretha bluebonnet =

Australian species of parrot

The Naretha bluebonnet (Northiella narethae) or Naretha parrot is a bird found in a remote and arid region of Australia. It is one of two species in the genus Northiella, and was first recorded in 1921 in Central Australia.

== History ==
It was first described by Henry Luke White in 1921 as Psephotus narethae. An associate of White's, the field worker F. Lawson Whitlock, had come across a railway official on the Trans-Australian Railway with a pet parrot that had been caught at Naretha, which corresponded with no known species. Later, White was heading to Western Australia on business and stopped in Zanthus to talk to the official and obtained three skins which he conveyed to the museum in Melbourne. The bluebonnet species was included for some time in the Psephotus genus with the Naretha, despite the very pronounced physical and behavioural differences to other birds in this genus. One of the biggest differences being that unlike the obvious sexual dimorphism of the Psephotus genus, the Naretha (and bluebonnets in general) sexual colouration of plumage is alike. The bluebonnet also has pointed or spatulate tips on the first five primary flight feathers. The behavioural variations of bluebonnets include characteristic jerky, bobbing movements which are accentuated with excitement or fear and they have unique call notes; unlike any other Australian bird. The Naretha parrot was subsequently classified as a subspecies (N. h. narethæ) of Northiella haematogaster, the eastern bluebonnet. A molecular study published in 2015 by Gaynor Dolman and Leo Joseph confirmed its genetic isolation from the eastern bluebonnet and recommended it be reinstated as a separate species. Henry White was a wealthy pastoralist and was also a well known ornithologist and collector. He had enlisted the services of Whitlock to collect avifauna on this occasion in the areas of the western Nullarbor Plain; during these times - in the late 1910s Australia was creating a significant east-west railway network - and Whitlock traveled to the area via train. Whitlock set up his exploration camp at the railway siding settlement of Zanthus and it was while he was staying at this town he saw the pet bird of a railway employee, deMarcaux, and it was a bird he had not seen before. DeMarcaux told Whitlock this pet bird had been taken from a nest, 5 years earlier at the railway line settlement of Naretha; which was 120km to the east of Zanthus.

== Description ==
The Naretha bluebonnet is smaller than the eastern bluebonnet, at around 28 cm (11 in) in length. The legs and feet are dark grey, and the iris is dark brown. The adult male has a two tonal facial pattern with a lighter green-blue forehead, lores and the area above the eye contrasting with the rest of the face which is a purplish-blue. The light grey-brown head, foreneck and breast are marked with pale steaks and diffuse spots. The back is olive-grey. The belly, vent and thighs are a uniform yellow with the red being restricted to the undertail-coverts area. The lesser wing coverts are blue and outer median wing coverts red, while the inner median and greater wing coverts, and inner secondaries a yellow-olive colour. The central tail feathers are tinged with pale blue. The adult female has a duller blue on the forehead, and reduced colour on wings and tail, and with no tint of orange on the belly. It is smaller overall at around 26 cm (10 in) in length.

== Distribution and habitat ==
The Naretha bluebonnet is reported to have been common in the arid Nullarbor region, and became rarer during the 20th century. The localised range of individuals is thought to make the species highly endemic to an area on the border of Western and South Australia. Narethas are located in what is termed the Myall woodlands - this is a woodland dominated by acacia species. The Naretha homelands extend over a large and isolated range. They are often observed more readily in areas where water has become an altered focal point - notably water troughs for stock.

== Breeding ==
Breeding takes place in hollows in she-oak (Casuarinaceae) trees. The oval eggs are matte white. Breeding begins early and Narethas are laying their first eggs by mid July. In the wild the site chosen is often a she-oak tree hollow which has a small knot hole entrance. However observers have also reported they have seen hens of the species emerge from tree crevices and splits rather than actual holes. The scarcity of suitable trees in the Naretha homelands is perhaps the most likely explanation as to why a bird would squeeze itself in such a small space.

== Gallery ==
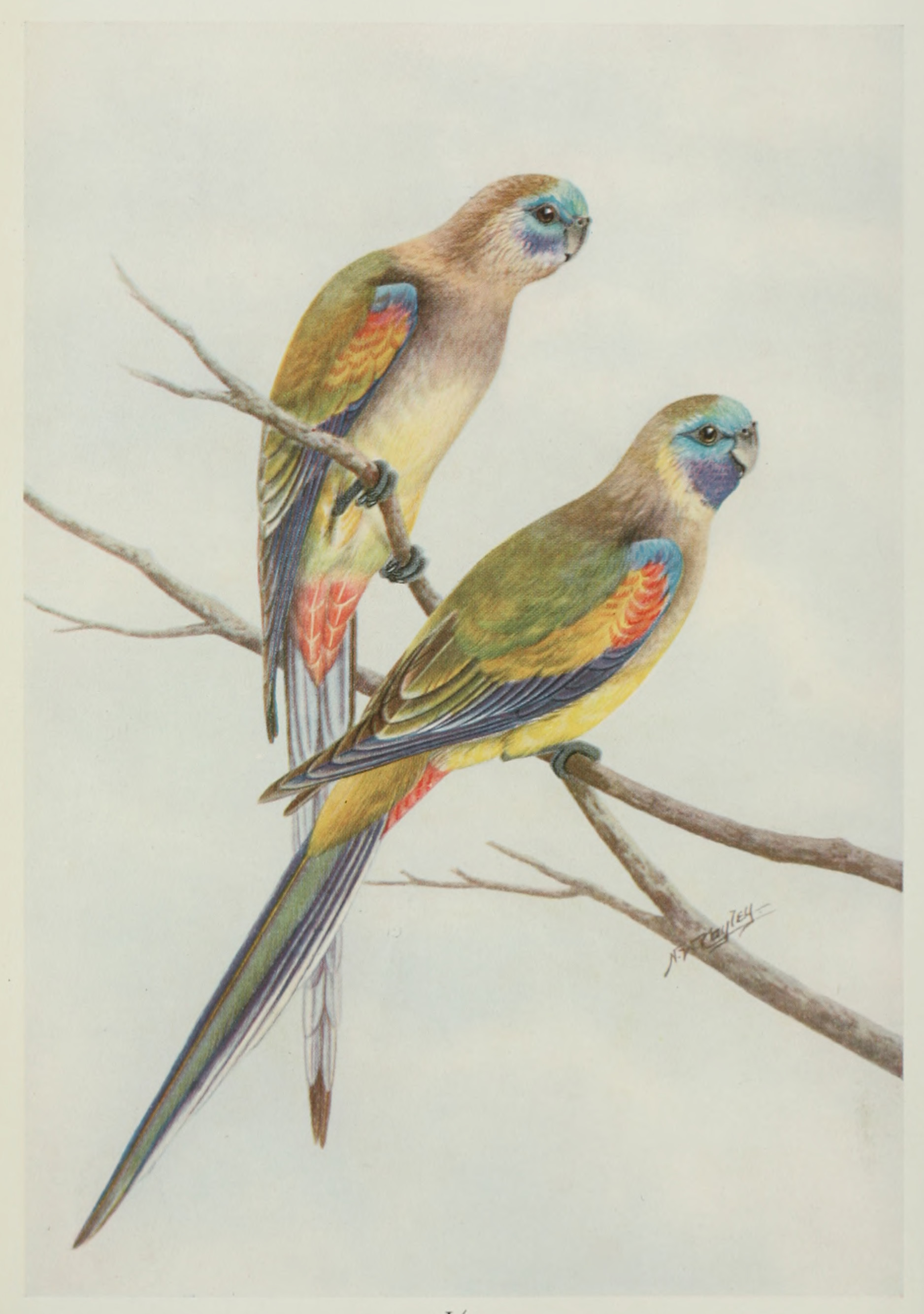
Illustration by Neville W. Cayley accompanying the first description. The Emu, 1922

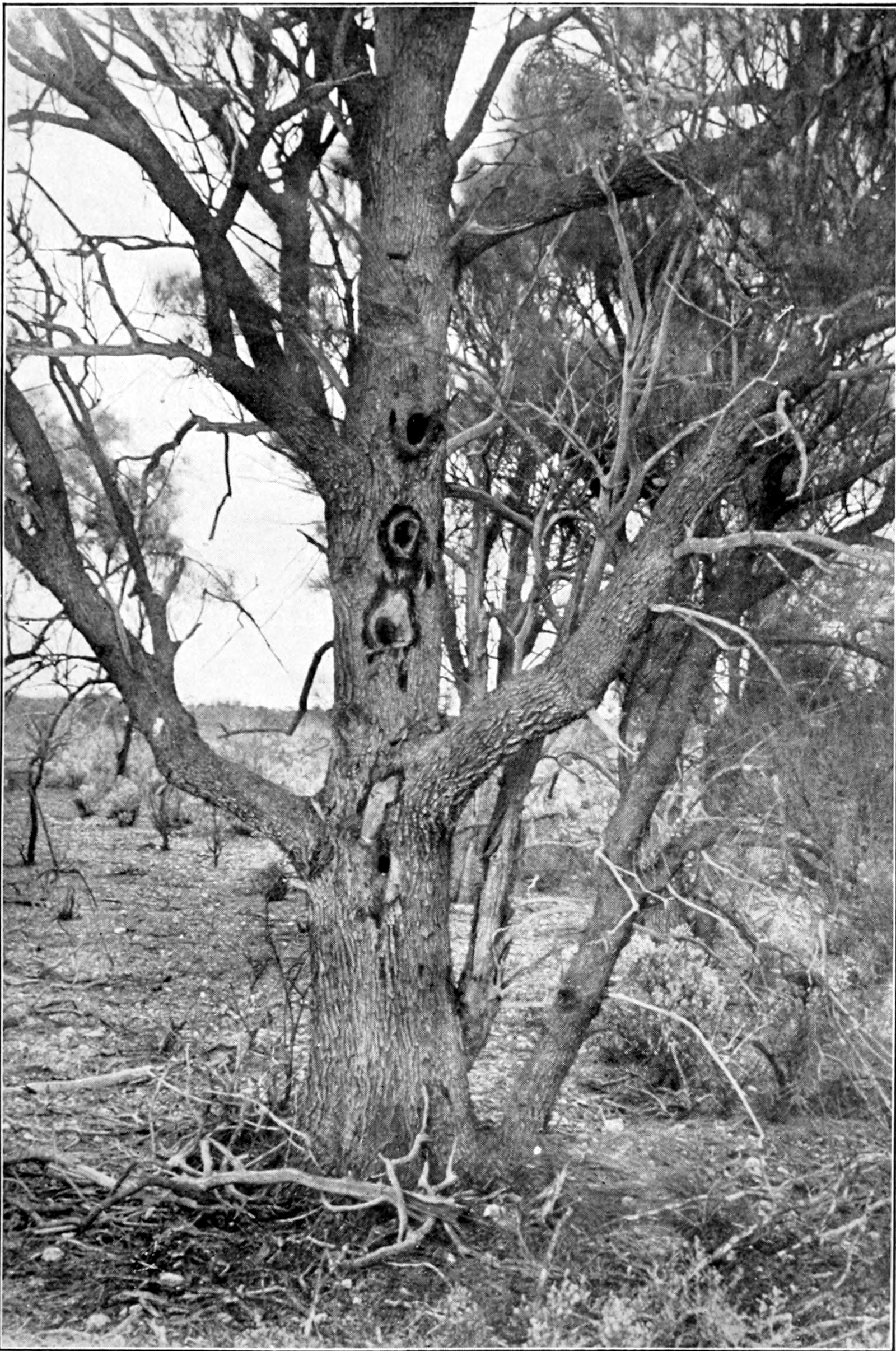
Nesting site with hole cut for access by F. Lawson Whitlock, field notes in The Emu, 1922

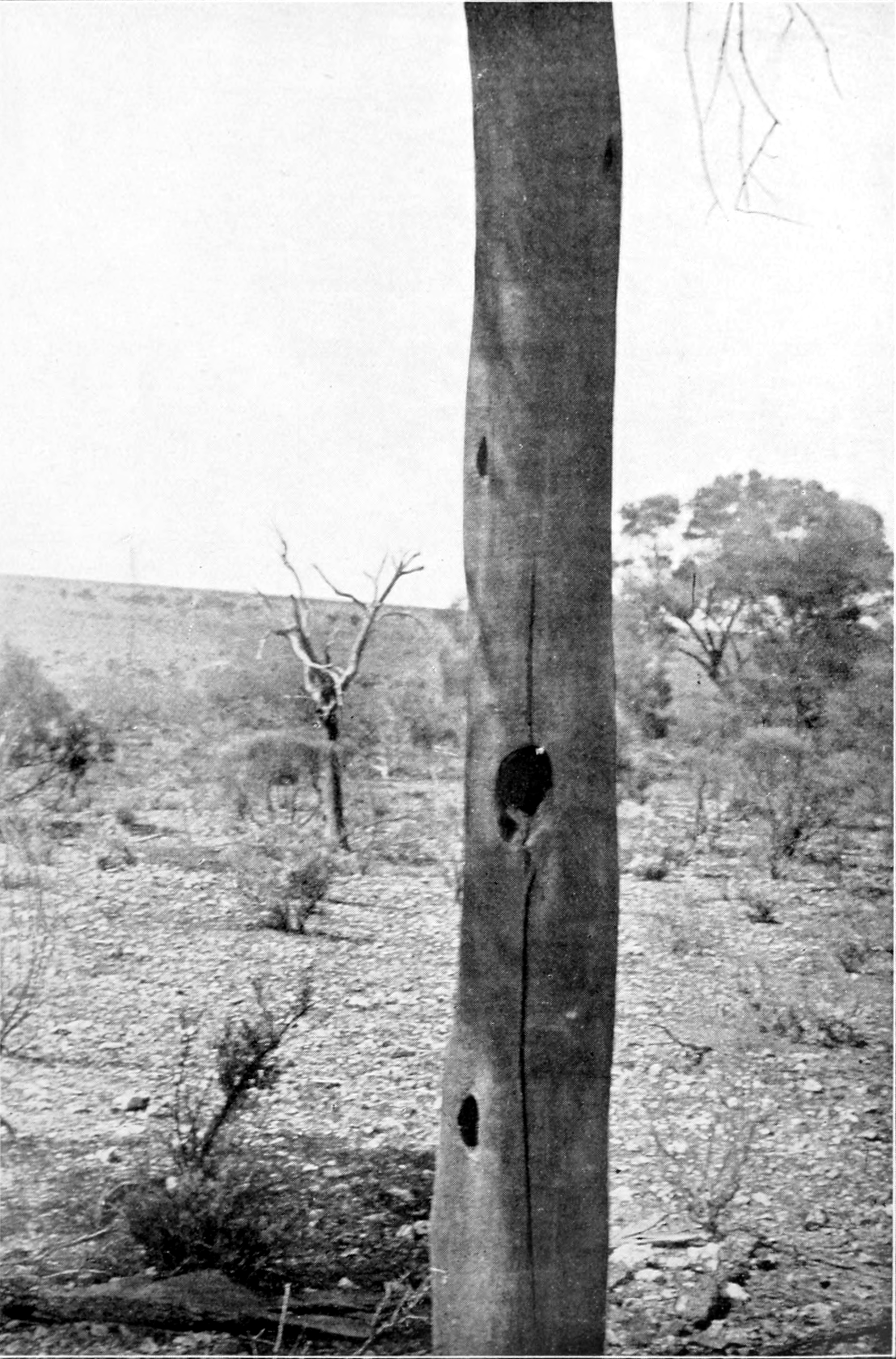
In dead she-oak, nest site at base, Whitlock, 1922
