= Albert Spencer =

Albert Spencer may refer to:

- Albert Spencer, 7th Earl Spencer (1892–1975), British peer
- Albert Spencer (footballer), English footballer
- Albert Spencer (gymnast) (1897–?), British gymnast
- Albert Henry Spencer (1886–1971), Australian bookseller
