= Robert Carl Sticht =

American metallurgist

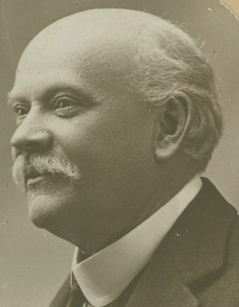
Robert Carl Sticht (State Library of Victoria)

Robert Carl Sticht (8 October 1856 – 30 April 1922) was an American metallurgist and copper mine manager, active in Colorado and Montana, U.S.A. and in Tasmania, Australia. Sticht was the developer of the first successful purely pyritic smelting in the world, using the (then) plentiful supply of native timber as fuel. He was also an important book and art collector, a large part of whose collections were acquired by the Public Library of Victoria and the National Gallery of Victoria in the 1920s.

== Career ==
Sticht's time at Mount Lyell was marked by a disastrous underground fire at the North mine on 12 October 1912, when some 42 miners died from carbon monoxide poisoning.

Sticht had a holiday tour in the United States in 1914–15; in 1917 he was again in Tasmania investigating problems in connection with the Mount Read and Rosebery ores. He died at Launceston, Tasmania, on 30 April 1922 and was succeeded by Russell Mervyn Murray, an employee for whom he had little regard but who managed the mines successfully for a similar length of time. Sticht was survived by his wife and three sons.

== Memberships ==
- Australasian Institute of Mining Engineers president 1905, 1915, vice-president 1909
- Australasian Association for the Advancement of Science president, Section C (chemistry, metallurgy, and mineralogy) 1907

== Legacy ==
Sticht was a cultivated man, interested in music, art and literature.

As Heather Lowe wrote in the Art Journal:

Sticht’s collecting activities were far broader than has been recognised...: in the first decade of this century he was to gather in his home on the remote west coast of Tasmania important collections not only of oil paintings, works on paper, incunabula and antiquarian books, book bindings, title pages, inscribed fly-leaves, and watermarks, but also of anthropological artefacts and mineral and botanical specimens. Within the history of art collecting in Australia, the Sticht Collection is unusual and fascinating, and deserves close attention for a variety of reasons, including the geographical isolation in which it was formed, and the wide-reaching intellectual inquisitiveness that structured its formation.

In 1923, following Sticht's death, the Melbourne bookseller Albert Henry Spencer of the Hill of Content bookshop was appointed to handle the dispersal of the former's private library. Spencer later described it as "the finest library yet sold in Australia" and noted that "[i]t was rich in general literature as well in Australiana, beginning with manuscripts written before the invention of printing, going on to many items of incunabula, then on to great books through the centuries."

Among the buyers was the Public Library of Victoria which snapped up 'a large number of rare and important works'. These included a number of early Bibles, Euclid's Elementa (1482) (one of only three complete copies in the world), the 'Hendriks collection' of fly-leaves and title-pages, numbering over 3000 pieces, 137 volumes of the works of Johann Wolfgang von Goethe, the twenty-two volumes of Georg Kaspar Nagler's Neues allgemeines Künstler-Lexicon (1835–1852), Richard Earlom's Liber veritatis, or, A collection of two hundred prints, after the original designs of Claude Le Lorrain (1777), J.H. Green's A catalogue and description of the whole of the works of the celebrated Jacques Callot (1804), and Francesco Colonna's Hypnerotomachia Poliphili (1499), described as 'the most beautiful book of the fifteenth century'.

Some months earlier Public Library of Victoria and the National Gallery of Victoria had used funds from the Felton Bequest to purchase direct from the Sticht estate his large collection of Old Master prints and drawings, and a collection of early typography and books of extraordinary value, items which are now divided between the National Gallery of Victoria and the State Library of Victoria.

The mineral stichtite is named for him, as is the Sticht Range of mountains.
