= Charles Bendire =

German-born American scientist (1836–1897)

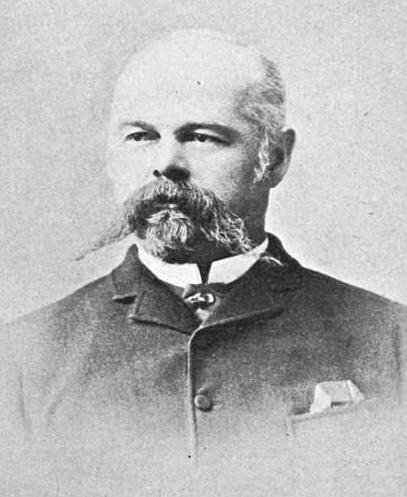
- Charles Bendire
- Born: Karl Emil Bender; April 27, 1836; König im Odenwald, Germany
- Died: February 4, 1897 (aged 60)
- Burial place: Arlington National Cemetery
- Military career
- Allegiance: United States of America
- Branch: United States Army
- Service years: 1854–1886
- Rank: Major
- Units: 4th Cavalry; 1st Cavalry
- Wars: American Civil War; Indian Wars
- Other work: Ornithologist

Major Charles Emil Bendire (April 27, 1836 – February 4, 1897) was a United States Army soldier and ornithologist and oologist. The Bendire's thrasher is named for him.

== Early life ==
Born Karl Emil Bender at König im Odenwald in the Grand Duchy of Hesse, he was the eldest of six children. Bender was home schooled until the age of twelve, after which he attended five years at a theological school at Passy, near Paris. Karl left school suddenly and returned home, and on the advice of a friend he and his brother Wilhelm Bender left for New York in 1853. Upon arrival they found that the New World did not meet their expectations. Wilhelm Bender soon sailed for home, but was lost overboard at sea.

== Army career ==
After his brother's departure, Bender enlisted in the United States Army at the age of eighteen on June 10, 1854, changing his name to Charles Bendire, dropping his middle name altogether. Although Bendire would later start using his middle initial again in correspondence and public notes, his legally official name did not contain a middle name.

Bendire served for five years as a private and subsequently a corporal in Company D, First Dragoons. After his tour of duty ended Bendire left the army for one year, but re-enlisted on June 8, 1860, and was assigned to the 4th Cavalry, where he served successively as a private, corporal, sergeant, and a hospital steward until he was commissioned as a 2nd Lieutenant in the 2nd Infantry on May 18, 1864. He transferred to the 1st Cavalry on September 9, 1864, and was eventually promoted to 1st Lieutenant (for "gallant and meritorious services" at the battle of Trevilian Station during the American Civil War), and later to captain, and then major. He retired on April 24, 1886, for disability contracted in the line of duty.

During Bendire's service in the army he was sent to many locations, often isolated, across America, for example Virginia, Arizona, Oregon, Washington, and California. Bendire mainly fought against American Indians during the periods of the United States' expansions. It was during these travels across North America that he developed a fondness for all things wild, and particularly birds.

== Ornithology ==
He initially sent letters containing his observations to other American naturalists such as Joel A. Allen, Thomas M. Brewer, Elliott Coues, and Robert Ridgway, who would publish them in American naturalist magazines like Bulletin of the Nuttall Ornithological Club and the American Naturalist. However, in 1877, he began to publish articles under his own name.

Bendire's private collection of 8,000 eggs formed the basis of the egg collection at the Smithsonian Institution, then known as the U.S. National Museum, in Washington, D.C. He made new discoveries about the migration habits of various birds and discovered several new species, including the Bendire's thrasher, Toxostoma bendirei.

On 1872 while patrolling in Central Arizona, Bendire reportedly snatched a zone-tailed hawk's egg from a nest for his collection while under fire from an Apache scout and secured it safely in his mouth until he could return to camp. It was alleged that he broke a tooth in his mouth while attempting to remove the egg, due to its large size.

He also published an early description of the Lost River sucker, now known as Deltistes luxatus, in the journal Forest and Stream while he was stationed at Fort Klamath in south-central Oregon. In it he provides descriptions of both the spawning fish and the Modoc Indians who were catching the fish at an important fishery location along the Lost River.

Bendire died of Bright's disease at the age of 60.

He was buried at Arlington National Cemetery, in Arlington, Virginia.
