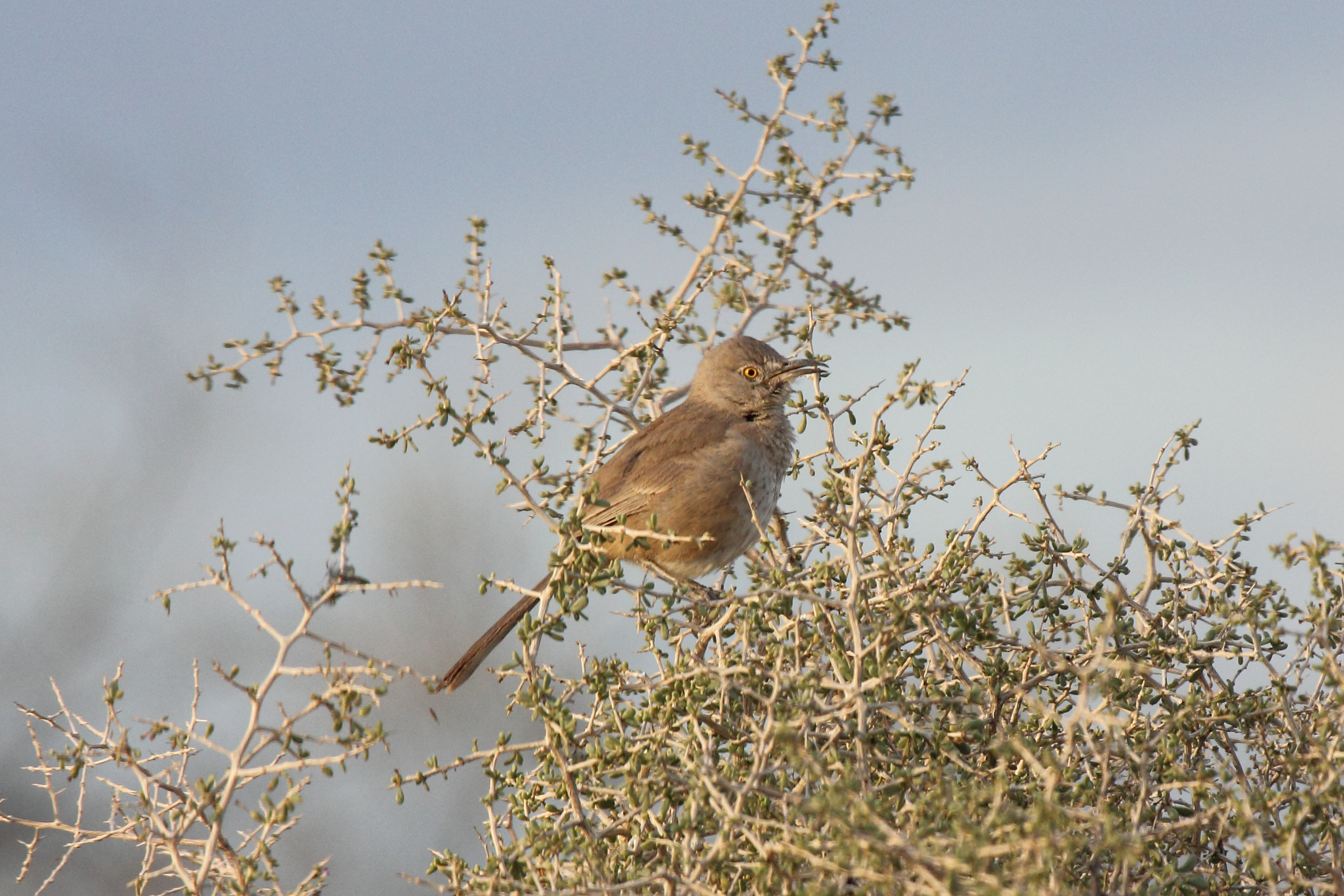

Conservation status
- Vulnerable (IUCN 3.1)

Scientific classification
- Kingdom: Animalia
- Phylum: Chordata
- Class: Aves
- Order: Passeriformes
- Family: Mimidae
- Genus: Toxostoma
- Species: T. bendirei

Binomial name
- Toxostoma bendirei (Coues, 1873)

= Bendire's thrasher =

Species of bird

Bendire's thrasher (Toxostoma bendirei) is a medium-sized species of thrasher native to the southwestern United States and northwestern Mexico. It is 23–28 centimetres (9.1–11.0 in) long, with a long tail and a medium-sized bill. Coloration is grayish-brown on its upperparts with paler, faintly dark streaked underparts. The base of the lower bill is often pale, the eyes are bright yellow, and the tips of the tail are white-tipped.

== Identification ==
Because of its similar coloration and structure to the curve-billed thrasher, the two birds are very easy to mistake for one another. The Bendire's thrasher's shorter bill is a distinguishing feature when comparing mature birds, but it is still easy to misidentify an adult Bendire's thrasher as a young curve-billed thrasher as its beak has not grown to a mature length. The Bendire's thrasher's yellow eyes and pale-based lower mandible are additional markings which aid in separation from the curve-billed thrasher.

== Distribution and habitat ==
Bendire's thrasher lives in the brush-filled deserts and valleys and drylands of the south-western United States, mainly along the southern border that Arizona and New Mexico shares with Mexico, (the Madrean sky islands, mountain range sky islands of the northern Mexican range: Sierra Madre Occidental).

The species has been described as polytypic, with two subspecies in addition to the nominate form.

Toxostoma bendirei (Coues, 1873): Arizona, New Mexico, Colorado, Nevada, Utah, California; in Mexico, Sonora, Sinaloa, and Baja California.

Toxostoma bendirei candidum van Rossem, 1942: Desert of western Mexico in western Sonora.

Toxostoma bendirei rubricatum van Rossem, 1942: Interior of southern and central Sonora and the coastal areas near Isla Tiburón.

There is also a 1988 record of it from Alberta, Canada, based on a photograph taken of the subject.

== Nesting ==
The Bendire's thrasher constructs a cup-shaped nest from twigs, lining the interior with grass stems and rootlets. It is usually placed in a cactus or an otherwise thorny desert shrub or tree. The female lays three or four eggs, which are pale green to blue in color, and speckled with brown and purple.

== Diet ==
The Bendire's thrasher, like many other thrashers, feeds on small ground-dwelling insects as well as berries.

== Voice ==
Like other mimids, the often silent Bendire's thrasher incorporates the songs and calls of other species into its own songs. A sharp "chek" is the species' most common call.

== Discovery ==
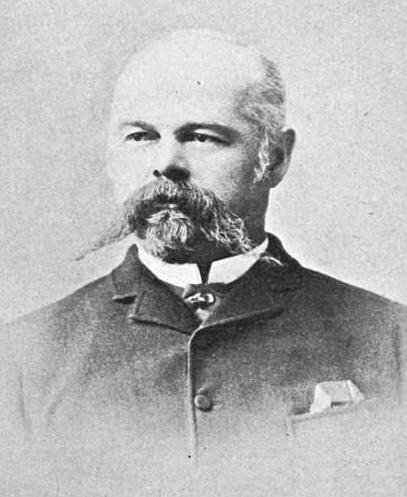
Charles Bendire

On July 28, 1872, U.S. Army Lieutenant Charles Bendire was hiking through the brushy desert near Fort Lowell, Arizona. While exploring the desert Bendire, an avid bird enthusiast, spotted a bird that was unfamiliar to him. Lieutenant Bendire shot the bird, which appeared to be a female thrasher, and sent its remains to the Smithsonian Institution in Washington, D.C.

The remains of the specimen were examined by Elliott Coues, who was perplexed as to its species. After several of Coues's colleagues looked at the bird they believed it was a female curve-billed thrasher, but Coues did not agree with their conclusion. Coues believed that the thrasher was a species unknown to science and sought out Bendire for additional information on the bird. Bendire replied to Coues with his affirmation that he also believed that it was a new species.

Lieutenant Bendire soon sent back a second specimen of the thrasher, a male, and details about its habits and eggs, all which were different from those of a curve-billed thrasher. Finally convinced, Coues named the new thrasher species Bendire's thrasher in the honor of Charles Bendire.

== Conservation ==
The Bendire's thrasher is listed as Vulnerable due to range-wide declines primarily as a result of the conversion of habitat to farmland.
