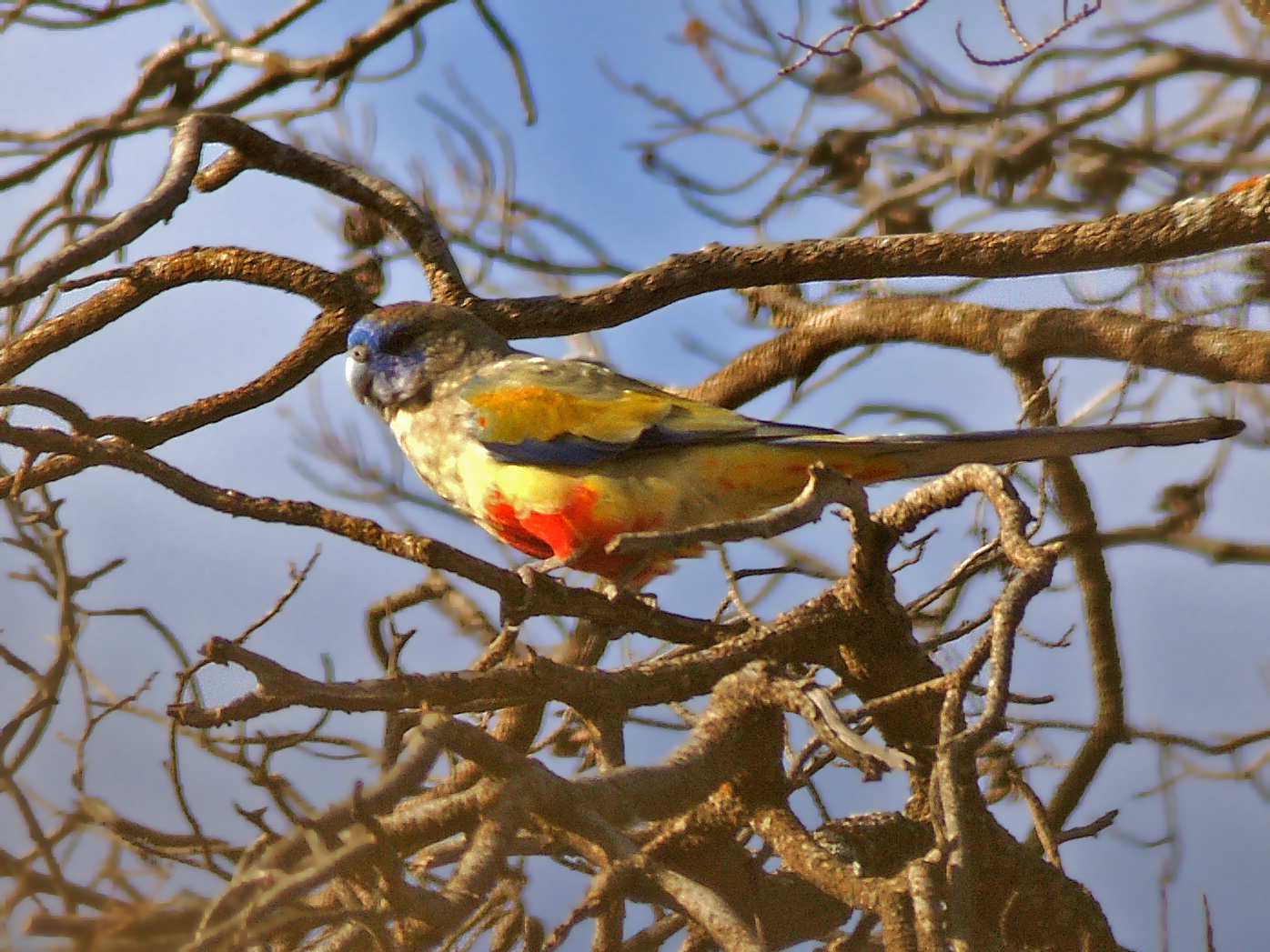
- Eastern bluebonnet (N. haematogaster).

Scientific classification
- Kingdom: Animalia
- Phylum: Chordata
- Class: Aves
- Order: Psittaciformes
- Family: Psittaculidae
- Tribe: Platycercini
- Genus: Northiella; Mathews, 1912

Type species
- Northiella haematogaster (Gould, 1838)

= Bluebonnet (bird) =

Northiella

Genus of birds

Bluebonnets, as they are commonly referred to, are small species of parrots native to Australia and classed within the Northiella genus—the eastern bluebonnet (N. haematogaster Gould, 1838) and the Naretha bluebonnet (N. narethae H.L. White, 1921). The genus is named in honour of Australian ornithologist Alfred John North.

== Description ==
The two bluebonnet species are medium-sized parrots endemic to Australia. Their upper body, back and neck areas are a light brown to grey. With the base of their wings having a dark blue patches. However, this species is primarily known for its crimson-coloured belly, yellow chest and light blue forehead and face.

The males within this species group can measure up to 35 cm in length with the females measuring to around 32 cm. Their weight varies between 70 and 100 grams, depending on the maturity and sex of the bird.

== Distribution ==
This species is found throughout the central land of Australia, extending from the southern Queensland, majority of the New South Wales (excluding the eastern coastline) to Northern Victoria. There is also evidence of this species being found within the State of South Australia and the eastern side of Western Australia.

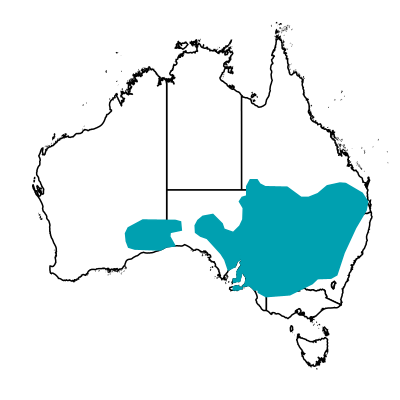
Distribution of the Northiella genus.

== Habitat ==
The Bluebonnet birds are primarily found within dry inland areas across south-eastern Australia. The favoured habitat for this species is in the Mallee region of north-west Victoria. Where it is found throughout cleared agricultural landscapes

== Taxonomy ==
For many years, bluebonnets were identified under the genus Psephotus which categorized them with the red-rumped parrot. The eastern bluebonnet, Northiella haematogaster is distinguished by their crimson underbelly and the Naretha bluebonnet, Northiella narethae was further separated by the crimson colour under the tail rather than under the belly.

== Behaviour ==
The blue bonnet bird is most active within the spring months of the year. They also have a tendency to be found in small groups due to their social behaviour. Where they are found to be most active during dusk and dawn, this is hypothesized to avoid predator encounters with nankeen kestrel or other ground dwelling bird eating mammals. Bluebonnets will often stick in pairs and do not seasonally migrate, nor travel far past their home territory.

== Diet ==
The eastern bluebonnet have observed drinking patterns of dusk and dawn. The primary diet includes seeds, fruits, small insects and flowers. The bluebonnet has included introduced vegetation species seeds into its diet such as buffel grass and native species such as the saltbush.

== Status ==
The eastern bluebonnet global population is unknown but not classified as threatened. The largest known threat to the eastern bluebonnet is the native vegetation clearing in Victoria.

== Species ==
Two species, one of which has three currently recognised subspecies, comprise the genus Northiella:

Genus Northiella – Mathews, 1912 – two species
Common name	Scientific name and subspecies	Range	Size and ecology	IUCN status and estimated population
Eastern bluebonnet	Northiella haematogaster (Gould, 1838) Subsp: N. h. haematorrhous; N. h. haematogaster; N. h. pallescens	S. Queensland, W. New South Wales, N. Victoria, E. South Australia	Size: Habitat: Diet:	LC
Naretha bluebonnet	Northiella narethae (White, HL, 1921)	SE Western Australia to SW South Australia	Size: Habitat: Diet:	
