= Colin Watson (egg collector) =

British egg collector

- Born: 20 November 1943
- Died: 24 May 2006 (aged 62); Campsall
- Cause of death: Fall from tree
- Occupation: Power station maintenance worker
- Known for: Egg collecting
- Criminal charge: Various
- Criminal penalty: Fines

Colin Watson (20 November 1943 – 24 May 2006) was a British egg collector who stole the eggs of rare and wild birds from protected wildlife sites throughout Great Britain for over twenty years before his death.

Despite six convictions and fines in thousands of pounds, he amassed the largest egg collection in the country before the collection was confiscated by agents of the Royal Society for the Protection of Birds (RSPB) during a 1985 raid on his home. The collection numbered more than 2,000 eggs, including eggs from species such as golden eagles and osprey. He successfully defended himself against the subsequent charge of illegal possession in April 1985, claiming that, with the exception of sixteen eggs, he had collected his eggs before the Wildlife and Countryside Act of 1981. Later in his life, he was convicted on other charges and was issued a £2,800 fine. A year later, he was accused of attempting to cut down an osprey nesting tree with a chainsaw in Loch Garten, Scotland.

Family and friends claimed he had retired from egg collecting during the early 1990s, and his last conviction was 10 years prior to his death. However, he remained on several informal lists maintained by the RSPB and other organizations, detailing around 300 known or suspected egg collectors; the RSPB would log these collectors' cars if they went near the nesting sites of rare birds.

He died in 2006 after falling 12 metres (39 ft) from a larch tree he climbed to observe a nest of a protected species, in woodland near the village of Campsall in South Yorkshire. Although he remained alive shortly after his fall, he died before the arrival of paramedics and was officially pronounced dead on the scene. An inquest at Doncaster Coroner's Court heard from Watson's wife that he had a history of high blood pressure and that he suffered from "dizzy spells". On 30 August 2006, the coroner ruled that Watson's death was accidental.
