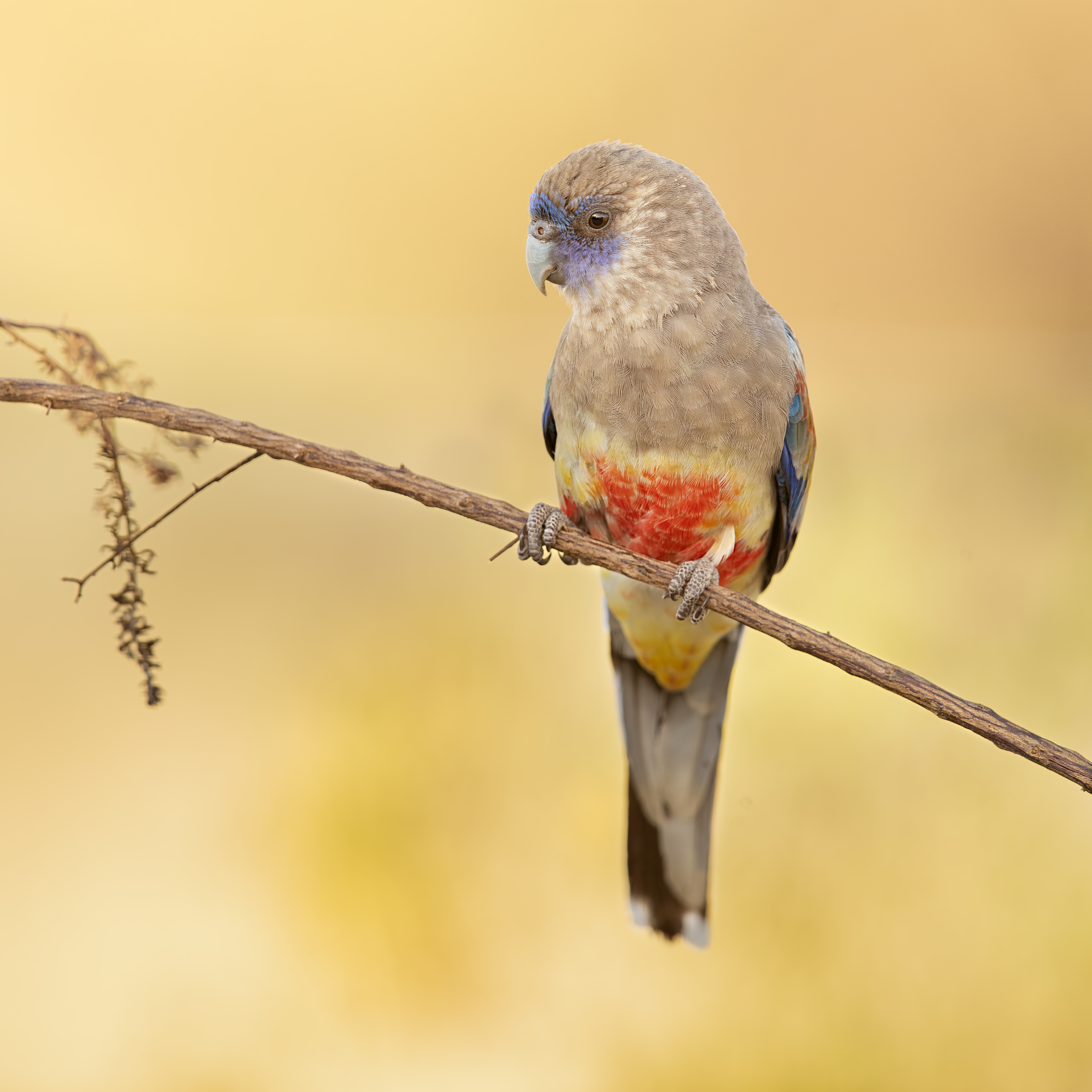

Conservation status
- Least Concern (IUCN 3.1)

Scientific classification
- Kingdom: Animalia
- Phylum: Chordata
- Class: Aves
- Order: Psittaciformes
- Family: Psittaculidae
- Genus: Northiella
- Species: N. haematogaster

Binomial name
- Northiella haematogaster (Gould, 1838)

= Eastern bluebonnet =

Species of bird

The eastern bluebonnet (Northiella haematogaster), also known as the greater bluebonnet, is an Australian parrot, one of two species in the genus Northiella. It was originally included in the genus Psephotus but due to distinctive physical and behavioural differences was reclassified into its own genus in 1994 by ornithologists and taxonomists Christidis and Boles. The bluebonnet is a medium-sized inland parrot commonly found in the interior of southeastern and central-southern Australia. It is adapted to life in semi-arid regions but can also flourish in regions of medium rainfall towards the eastern and southern extremities of its range.

== Taxonomy ==
Once included in the genus Psephotus the eastern bluebonnet has been placed in its own genus due to its significant physical and behavioural differences form other members of Psephotus. Throughout its range three distinctive subspecies are recognized:

- Northiella haematogaster haematorrhous – commonly known as the red-vented bluebonnet is found in the northeast of the species range.
- Northiella haematogaster haematogaster – commonly known as the yellow-vented bluebonnet is found in the central north of the species range between N. h. haematorrhous and N. h. pallescens.
- Northiella haematogaster pallescens – commonly known as the pallid bluebonnet is found in the extreme northwest of the species range.

A fourth has been once again classified as a separate species, the Naretha bluebonnet.

Where each subspecies overlaps there is a substantial amount of integration between the subspecies.

== Description ==
The eastern bluebonnet is a medium-sized parrot with prominent crest-like head feathers. All bluebonnets have a mostly olive-grey to brown upper body, foreneck and breast, with the outerwing and leading edge to the folded wing being dark blue, a blue forehead and face. The bill is pearl grey, the cere is light grey, iris colour is brown-grey, and the feet and legs are dark grey. There is no seasonal variation in the plumage and there are no similar looking species to the bluebonnet parrot.

Body length – Male – 28–35 cm, Female – 26–32 cm

Wingspan – Male – 36–42 cm, Female 34–38 cm

Weight – 70-100g

Each subspecies displays significant geographical variation in plumage and size. Most differ by the amount of red on the underbody and the pattern of the inner upperwing which varies from olive-yellow with a blue carpal patch and little or no red to mostly red with a blue-green carpal patch.

Subspecies descriptions – differences from nominate species

- N. h. haematorrhous – the red of underbody covers the entire undertail and coverts area. On the folded wing the shoulder patch is mostly red and the leading edge is a much lighter blue-green around the carpal joint.
- N. h. haematogaster – the lower underparts are yellow with a variable amount of red on the abdomen with a yellowish-olive wing patch.
- N. h. pallescens – paler, showing much less contrast between the breast and pale yellow of the underbelly.

Adult female – the sexes differ slightly with the females being slightly duller with less red on the belly than males. Females often also have a narrow off-white band across the underside of the inner primaries but this is not always present.

Juvenile – similar to the adult female but slightly duller and usually have less red on the belly. The most distinctive feature of juvenile's is the brownish-orange colour of the bill which will become the pearl-grey adult colour within two months of fledging. Juvenile's will attain adult plumage when they moult at about three to four months of age.

Call – harsh 'chack chack', flute like 'cloote' and a loud 'yak-yak-yak'.

== Distribution ==
Bluebonnets are found in the interior of southeastern and central-southern Australia. The range extends from northern Victoria to southern Queensland in the east across to southeastern Western Australia in the west. Subspecies are found in distinct areas of the distribution of the bluebonnet as follows:

- N. h. haematorrhous – south Queensland to northern New South Wales.
- N. h. haematogaster – west and south New South Wales and northwest Victoria to southeast South Australia.
- N. h. pallescens – inland South Australia, the Lake Eyre Basin.

=== Movements ===
Bluebonnets are considered to be resident and sedentary or locally nomadic with no large scale seasonal or regular long-distance movements occurring.

== Habitat ==
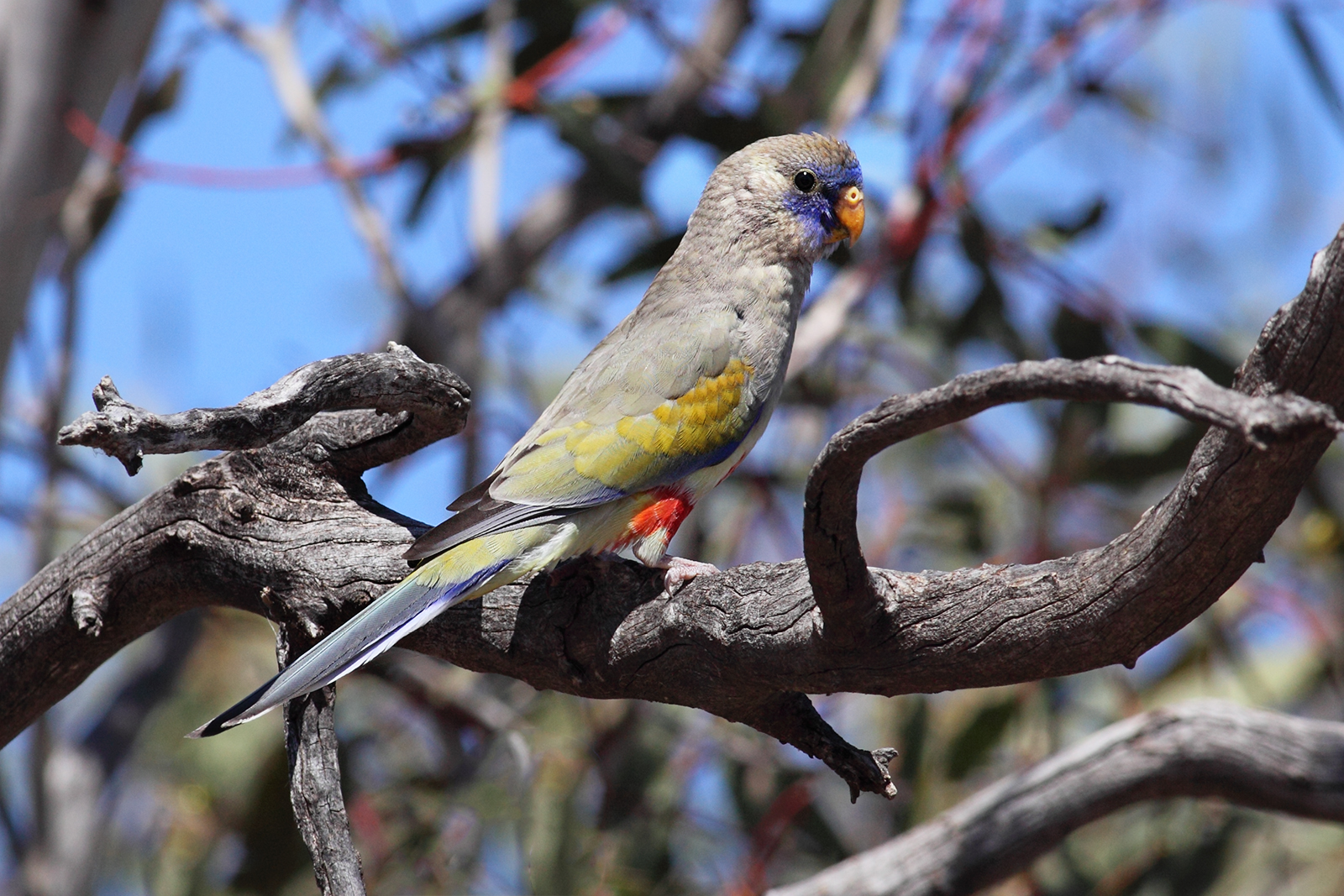
In South Australia

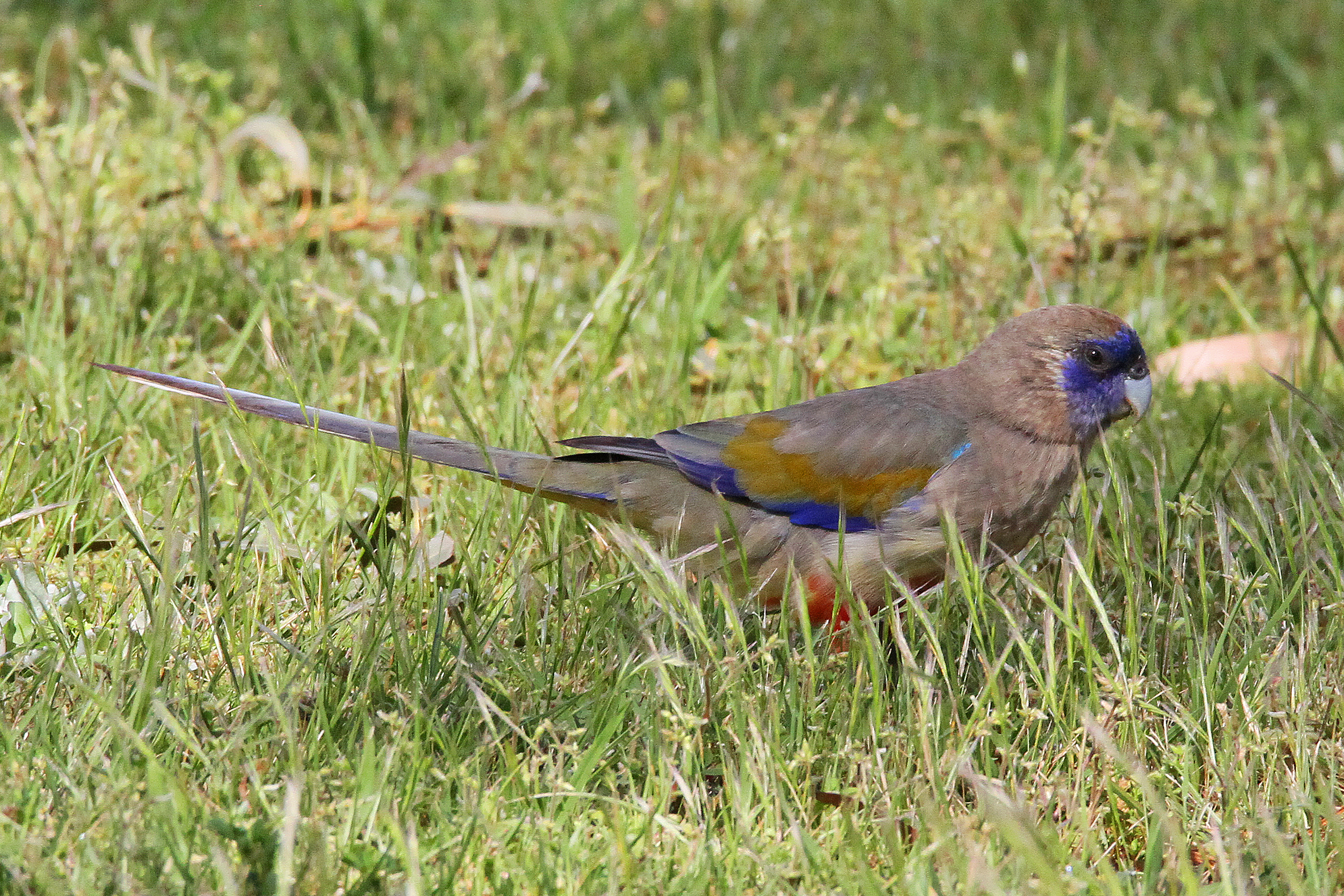
Feeding on the ground in Griffith, New South Wales

Bluebonnets inhabit arid and semi-arid zones in Australia. They inhabit open woodlands dominated by false sandalwood, (Myoporum), belah Casuarina cristata, native pine Callitris, western myall, gidgee, and mulga Acacia, and Eucalyptus, often with a low shrub layer of chenopods such as saltbush Atriplex or blue bush Maireana. Bluebonnets will also inhabit open grassy plains, scrub, and trees bordering watercourses. Remnant patches of mallee in northern Victoria are also important habitat areas for birds in the south of their range.

== Diet ==
Bluebonnets feed mostly on the ground on the seed of native and introduced grasses, herbaceous plants, trees and shrubs as well as foraging on fruit, berries, vegetable matter, flowers, nectar, insects and their larvae and in arid areas the seeds and fruit of the saltbush.

All bluebonnets mainly drink at dawn and dusk and are cautious when approaching water.

== Social behaviour ==
Bluebonnets are usually found in pairs or small groups of under ten birds. Pairs separate to breed in late winter before rejoining the flock in late spring with their young. When flushed bluebonnets will quickly leave the ground whistling their call notes while on the wing. They will fly to a nearby tree where they will fall silent and adopt an erect posture to inspect the intruder awaiting the opportunity to return to the ground. Bluebonnets fly with an undulating, sometimes jerky gait generally below tree-top levels.

== Breeding ==
Bluebonnets normally breed between August and January but this can start earlier or run later in response to prolonged periods of rainfall. During his courtship display the male bluebonnet will raise and lower his 'crest', stretch his neck, vibrate his partly raised wings and move his fanned tail from side to side. Bluebonnets form monogamous pairs and will normally only breed once a year but in years with abundant rainfall have been known to breed twice in one season. The nest site is selected and prepared by both the male and female and is often in a hollow in the trunk or limb of a tree, living or dead with a small entrance hole. Usually four to seven white oval eggs will be laid on a layer of decaying wood dust on the bottom of the nesting cavity. Only the female incubates the eggs and is fed by the male during this time. Incubation lasts approximately nineteen days and chicks hatch covered in white down. The female continues to brood the chicks alone but the male participates in feeding the chicks with the hen. Chicks fledge the nest at about thirty days old and continue to be fed by the parents until they are independent at about 12 days after they have fledged. The family will then rejoin the flock.

== Aviculture ==
The bluebonnet is a moderately common species in the wild though not so in captivity as they are often regarded as being drab, noisy, extremely aggressive and poor breeders.
