= R. M. Murray =

Queenstown, Tasmania based mining engineer

Russell Mervyn Murray (12 July 1877 – 22 January 1945), commonly referred to as R. M. Murray, was general manager of the Mount Lyell Mining and Railway Co. Ltd, Queenstown, Tasmania for 22 years. Unusually for a mining man, his entire career of 44 years was spent at one location and for one company.

== History ==
Murray was born in Elliminyt, south of Colac, Victoria in 1877, elder son of Andrew Strachan Murray (c. 1847 – 10? 19? August 1930) and Florence Eleanor Murray, née Blunden.

His paternal grandparents were Hugh Murray (1814–1869) and Elizabeth Murray née Young (1823–1892), "founders" of Colac. Andrew S. Murray was reputedly the first white child born in the area, though that honour may belong to the unrelated Margaret Twiss, née Murray (30 or 31 May 1843 – 1 January 1933).

Murray was a prize-winning student at several short-lived private schools: Colac Grammar School 1890, Manifold House Ladies' School (with his sister Ilma) 1891, before matriculating from Colac College 1895. He entered the University of Melbourne in 1896, and graduated Bachelor of Civil Engineering with honors in 1899, and was awarded the Dixson scholarship.

He joined the Mount Lyell company as a junior engineer in 1900, and became engineer in charge of mines following the death of W. T. Batchelor on 27 October 1906. Every stage in his rise in the Company was resisted by general manager Robert Sticht, who saw him as an ineffectual intellectual, constitutionally unable to deal with the Union in the tough unyielding manner that characterised Sticht's leadership.

North Lyell mine suffered a disastrous fire on 12 October 1912 which started in a pump-house 700 ft below ground and spread to the shoring timbers, and some 42 miners working below that level died from carbon monoxide poisoning who might have survived had the winze (inclined passageway) between the 700 ft and 500 ft levels been clear. Murray gave evidence at the subsequent Royal Commission, supporting the Company's contention that an electrical fault was an unlikely cause of the fire. The Humane Society awarded 34 medals to the rescuers, including a silver medal to Murray.

Sticht, manager since 1897, died in April 1922 and Murray was appointed his successor, but at a little over half the salary. Despite a world-wide reduction in demand for copper and low-cost competition from Africa and the Americas, Murray was able to increase production from 140,000 tons in 1922 to 1,500,000 tons in 1943 and maintain dividends for the shareholders and employment for the workers, though at a considerable cost to the environment. He was highly regarded by the workers, who remembered his brave exertions during the disaster, and appreciated his cool decisiveness and concern for the amenity of the town.

Murray was instrumental in the adoption of electrolytic refining of copper, made possible by Tasmania's then abundance of cheap hydroelectric power.

Murray retired as general manager of Mount Lyell Mining and Railway Co. Ltd in October 1944, and was succeeded by Arthur H. P. Moline. He died in Melbourne and his remains were cremated at Springvale.

== Family ==
Murray married Vivienne "Viva" Douglas ( – 19 June 1945) sometime around 15 November 1905. She was the fourth daughter of Arthur Cunningham Douglas (1840 – 5 February 1888), at one time postmaster general of Hobart, and his wife Susan Elizabeth Douglas, née Tapfield. Their three sons and two daughters, all of whom held degrees from Melbourne University include:

- Hugh Mervyn Murray (6 September 1906 – ) engaged to Nora Nel Scott-Power in 1942. He was manager of the flotation mill in 1935, general superintendent at Mount Lyell Mines in 1945, appointed general manager 1948.

- daughter 18 November 1950

- Strahan Murray ( – ) married Joyce Tabart of Queenstown on 24 April 1936, ran sheep station "Wongan", near Beaufort, Victoria

- Margaret Murray
- Robert Murray
- son (6 November 1943 – )

- Ben Murray ( – )
- Fay Murray MSc ( – ) was researcher with Melbourne University, then Fisheries section of CSIR, Cronulla, New South Wales.
- Marjory Murray ( – ) Conservatorium of Music, East Melbourne in 1931

From around 1925 to 1944 or later they had a home "Penghana" in Queenstown, previously the name of a nearby settlement and post office.

Vivienne, who was active in the Child Welfare Association from its inception, was a sister of Kathleen Louisa Douglas, who married William Vincent Legge (1841–1918), also of Margery Lenore Douglas (3 Nov 1886 – 1976) who married Capt. Edward Carleton Stubbs RN on 9 October 1914. Percy Cunningham Douglas OBE (1870 – 24 June 1938), Deputy-Commissioner of Federal Taxation in Hobart, was a brother≈.

R. M. Murray had a brother Rex Murray living on the Australian mainland. In 1905, while a metallurgy student at Bairnsdale School of Mines, a glass vessel exploded and he was blinded in one eye. By cruel misfortune the unaffected eye was practically useless owing to a cataract.

== Other interests ==
- Murray was a member of the Australasian Institute of Mining and Metallurgy, a councillor from 1923, and president in 1927.

He was awarded the medal of that organization in 1943 in recognition of his work at Mount Lyell.
He was also a member of the American Institute of Mining and Metallurgical Engineers

- He was elected Warden of Gormanston municipality in 1920 and was re-elected each year for the rest of his life.
- He was instrumental in the foundation of the Mount Lyell School of Mines, and served as its Patron.
- He was also behind the foundation of the Queenstown Brass Band, and was elected its Patron in 1934.
