= Henry Luke White =

Pastoralist and ornitholgist in New South Wales, Australia

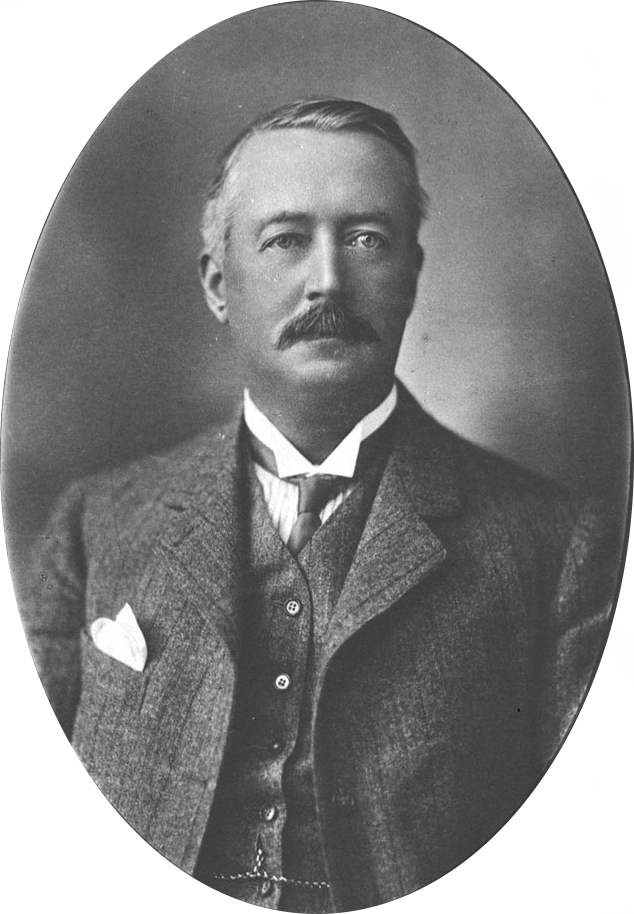
H L White of Belltrees Station

Henry Luke White (9 May 1860 – 30 June 1927) was a wealthy grazier, and a keen philatelist, book collector, amateur ornithologist and oölogist of Scone, New South Wales, Australia.

== Personal life ==
Born 9 May 1860 at Anambah third son of pastoralist Francis White and his wife Mary Hannah nee Cobb. He first went to Calder House in Redfern in 1875 he attended the Goulburn School at Garroorigang. In 1884 he became a qualified surveyor and in 1885 became the manager of Belltrees near Scone which he owned with his younger brothers William, Arthur, and Victor. His older brother James was also a pastoralist and would later serve on the New South Wales Legislative Council. James had married Emiline Eliza Ebsworth in 1882 and in a dynastic union, Henry married a Emiline's sister, Louisa Maude, on 14 April 1887. His brother Arthur married a third sister, Millicent, in 1893.

Belltrees had 96,000 merino sheep and 10,000 cross bred sheep that would take five months each year to shear. In 1902 they began using Wolseley sheep shearing machines. The estate was also famous for its Durham shorthorn and Angus cattle. In 1906 he was appointed a temporarily councilor for the Woolooma Shire, (renamed Upper Hunter in 1917), serving as Shire President until 1927, and missing only 2 council meetings in those 20 years. The brothers inherited some of the famous stud mares from their uncle James White, winning the 1896 AJC Derby with Charge and the 1900 Doncaster with Parapet.

== Philately ==
White was a noted philatelist, purchasing a Queensland collection of stamps from Edward van Weenen in 1897. In 1917 he presented his collection of stamps from New South Wales, then valued at £15,000, to the Mitchell Library. He subsequently donated his collection of stamps from Western Australia, Queensland and Tasmania. He was appointed to the Roll of Distinguished Philatelists in 1922.

== Book collecting ==
He was also an avid collector of Australian books and owned more than 2,000 rare items. His collection included works on philately, ornithology, and cricket. In building this collection, he benefited from the guidance of noted Australian bookseller, Albert Henry Spencer.

== Ornithology ==
H. L. White wrote short articles published in Emu, and corresponded with the American Ornithologists' Union. He was a member of the Royal Australasian Ornithologists Union (RAOU) to which he was a generous benefactor. His collections of 8,500 bird skins and over 4,200 egg clutches were donated to the National Museum of Victoria, Melbourne where they are known as the H. L. White Collection. He is also commemorated in the BirdLife Australia's (previously RAOU) large ornithological book and serial collection: the H. L. White Library.

== Family ==
H. L. White was the father of Alfred Henry Ebsworth White, who was honoured in the name of the grey honeyeater, Conopophila whitei by the ornithologist Alfred John North. He was also the uncle of the writer Patrick White, who described him as the only paternal uncle he favoured.

== References and sources ==
Sources

- Robin, Libby (2001). The Flight of the Emu: a hundred years of Australian ornithology 1901-2001. Carlton, Vic: Melbourne University Press. ISBN 0-522-84987-3.
- White, Judy (1981). The White Family of Belltrees. 150 years in the Hunter Valley. Sydney: Seven Press. ISBN 9780959396607.
