= H. L. White Collection =

Coordinates: 37.803337°S 144.971445°E

The H. L. White Collection is a collection of Australian birds’ eggs originally accumulated by pastoralist, amateur ornithologist and oologist Henry Luke White (1860–1927). After White's death, it was passed to the National Museum of Victoria in Melbourne. The eggs of most of Australia's native bird species, including the extinct paradise parrot, are included in the collection, which comprises some 4200 clutches totalling 13,000 eggs. It is housed in the original custom-built Queensland maple cabinets commissioned by White.

== History ==
White's interest in egg-collecting began in boyhood and continued throughout his life. He increased the size of his own collection by purchasing others, including those of F. Lawson Whitlock, Dudley Le Souef and Sidney Jackson, the latter of whom he subsequently employed as curator of his egg and skin collection as well as a collector of additional specimens. White originally intended his collection to go to the Australian Museum in Sydney, an intention that was rescinded because of White's personal antipathy towards Alfred North, the Curator of Birds there.
