= Albert Henry Spencer =

Australian bookseller

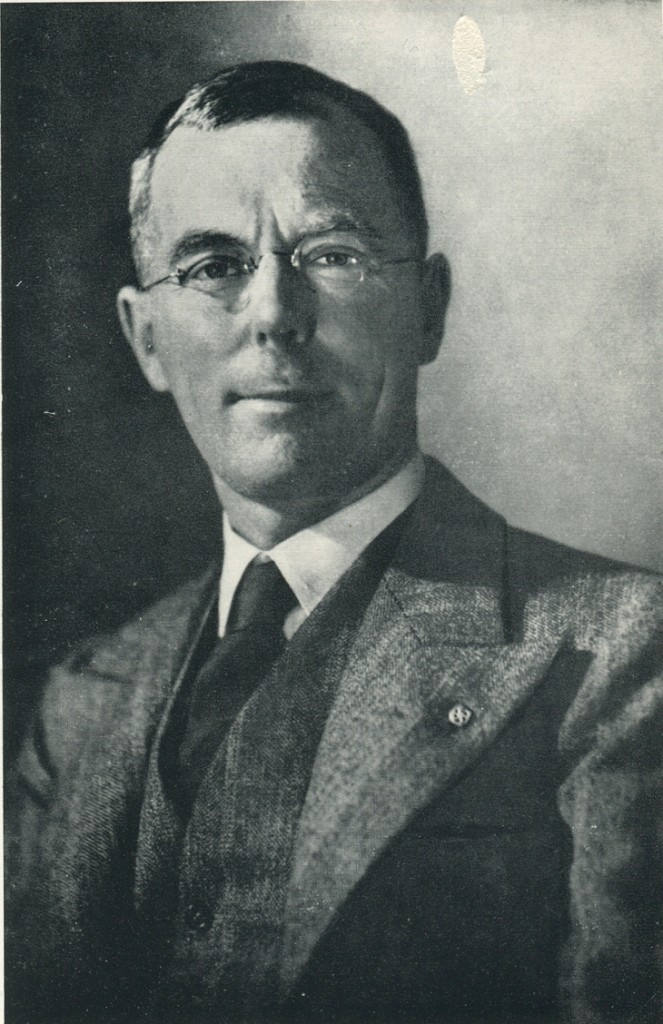
- Albert Henry Spencer
- Born: 8 March 1886; Balmain, New South Wales, Australia
- Died: 20 February 1971 (aged 84); Parkville, Victoria, Australia
- Occupation: Bookseller
- Writing career
- Notable works: The Hill of Content: Books, Art, Music, People

Albert Henry Spencer (8 March 1886 – 20 February 1971), often referred to as A. H. Spencer, was an Australian bookseller. He was a specialist in antiquarian bookselling and Australiana and established the Hill of Content bookshop in Melbourne, one of that city's "finest bookshops". He has been called "one of the last links with an heroic age of Australian bookselling and collecting".

== Early life ==
Spencer was born in Balmain, New South Wales on 8 March 1886. His parents were Henry Spencer, a labourer who had been born Henrik Bertelsen in Denmark, and Alice Jane (née Prynne).

His father died when Bert (as he was always known to his family and friends) was just two years old, leaving the family in straitened circumstances. He attended Waverley Superior Public School where a sympathetic teacher and a class reader were to inspire in him a life-long love of poetry and especially of the Romantic poets. His mother worked hard to keep the family together but at the age of 14, Bert was forced to leave school to work as a boot-clicker (cutting out the uppers of boots).

== Angus & Robertson, Sydney ==
Eight months later, he joined the booksellers and publishers Angus & Robertson as an errand boy. One of his regular tasks at this time was to deliver books by cab to various customers including David Scott Mitchell, whose collection would later become the basis for the Mitchell Library. Between 1900 and 1922 he was trained in the bookselling trade by "that formidable trio of booksellers", George Robertson and his employees Frederick Wymark and Jim Tyrrell. He became an expert in book-related Australiana and was made the head of Angus & Robertson's secondhand book department. During this period he became a "friend and confidant" of book collectors such as the businessman, collector and benefactor (Sir) William Dixson and the lawyer, judge, book collector, and author (Sir) John Ferguson.

== Hill of Content, Melbourne ==
Spencer wanted to open his own bookshop but, not wanting to compete with Angus & Robertson, his employer of more than twenty years, he diplomatically decided to set up his shop in Victoria. In 1922, with the support of Frank Hobill Cole and George Robertson and a loan of £1,000 from Henry White (an uncle of Patrick White), he established a bookshop in Melbourne called the Hill of Content. Located at 86 Bourke Street (where it has remained ever since, except for a few months at Eastern Market), this bookshop emerged as "a major outlet for antiquarian, second-hand and fine new books".

Spencer's clientele in the early years included book collectors, the literary elite and notable citizens of both Melbourne and Sydney, including Sir William Dixon, Daryl and Lionel Lindsay, Dame Nellie Melba, Tom Roberts and Arthur Streeton, as well as "various Governors, and members of medical and legal professions". In that period the Australian Parliament was located at the Victorian Parliament Building in nearby Spring Street while the State Parliament sat at the Royal Exhibition Buildings close by so that "many prominent politicians frequented the shop as well". Another customer was John Masefield, the British Poet Laureate during his visit to Melbourne for the Victorian Centenary Celebrations in 1934.

In the 1920s, through his network of connections and due to his reputation as a bookseller of note, he was appointed to handle the dispersal of the important private libraries of Frank Hobill Cole, Robert Carl Sticht and Henry White. In 1923 Edgar Charles Harris joined the staff of Hill of Content and was of great assistance in handling "the majesty of the Sticht Collection". The sale of the Sticht collection helped ensure the survival of Hill of Content and the sale of the other two collections was "icing on the cake".

Spencer formed a private company to operate Hill of Content, "issuing the preference shares to Collins Street doctor-clients".

Spencer also published a number of books, mainly of verse, under the imprint of "A. H. Spencer, Hill of Content". During the Second World War he placed posters in his bookshop windows praising Britain's war effort. His advertisements for his books were "personal and colourful".

== Later years ==
In 1952 Spencer sold Hill of Content to Angus & Robertson and began trading from his home at 41 Tennyson Street, Sandringham as the Shining Sea Bookroom. In the same year he superintended the transfer of Sir William Dixson's collection to the Public Library of New South Wales. In 1957 he rejoined his former employers Angus & Robertson in their Elizabeth Street, Melbourne bookshop and in 1959 he published his memoirs The Hill of Content.

== Personal life ==
In 1909 Spencer married Eileen Rebecca O'Connor (died 1964), an accomplished pianist. They had two children, Robert Spencer (died 1946) and Joan Gerstad (died 1970).

Spencer was a Presbyterian, a Freemason and a Rotarian.

He died at Parkville, Victoria on 20 February 1971.
