= Weenen-Kliprivier Commando =

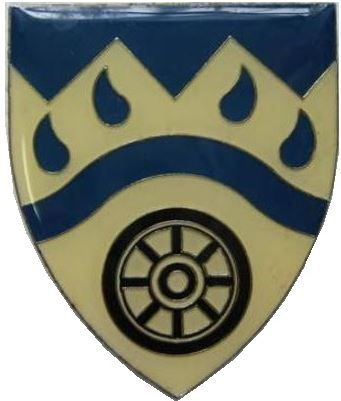
- Weenen-Kliprivier Commando emblem
- Active: 1899-2006
- Country: South Africa
- Allegiance: Republic of South Africa; Republic of South Africa
- Branch: South African Army; South African Army
- Type: Infantry
- Role: Light Infantry
- Size: One Battalion
- Part of: South African Infantry Corps; Army Territorial Reserve
- Garrison/HQ: Corner of Beacon and Barracks road, Ladysmith

Weenen-Kliprivier Commando was a light infantry regiment of the South African Army. It formed part of the South African Army Infantry Formation as well as the South African Territorial Reserve.

== History ==
=== Origin ===
==== Rifle Association ====
Weenen-Kliprivier Commando can be traced back to the 1887 Estcourt and Ladysmith Rifle Associations and the later raised Ladysmith Town Guard of 1899.

=== Operations ===
==== With the UDF ====
===== World War One =====
Members of the Defence Rifle Associations volunteered and were deployed on active service during the First World War.

The final name of this commando was issued on 16 December 1948 by a Government Gazette notice designating the magisterial districts of Kliprivier (Ladysmith), Bergville, Estcourt, and Mooirivier under its mandate.

When Midmar Commando was formed, the Mooirivier district was then subsequently allocated to that commando. The area of responsibility encompassed the Lesotho border with Natal along the Orange Free State provincial border and southwards to the east of Ladysmith and finally southwards again to meet up with the Midmar Commando border.

The headquarters of this unit was close to the military base at Ladysmith, home to 5 SAI and situated on the site of an Anglo Boer war military camp used during the siege of Ladysmith.

==== With the SADF ====
By 1967, the Commando chose the eland as its regimental emblem but it was quickly changed to a Long Tom gun in the same year. Both were symbols of the area. In 1974 the Long Tom was changed again, this time for a wagon wheel above a broken spear. This resulted in a complaint by the then Minister Buthelezi, who argued that the symbol had connotations that were unacceptable to the Zulu people. This resulted in a redesign again by 1989.

The last emblem still had a wagon wheel but now encompassed a mountain as well as tears from a translation of the word weenen.

===== Colours =====
In 1991 the Commando received its National Colours at a parade in Pietermaritzburg, the home of Group 9.

===== Freedom of entry =====
On 31 October 1991, the Commando was also granted Freedom of Entry into Ladysmith.

==== With the SANDF ====
===== Disbandment =====
This unit, along with all other Commando units was disbanded after a decision by South African President Thabo Mbeki to disband all Commando Units. The Commando system was phased out between 2003 and 2008 "because of the role it played in the apartheid era", according to the Minister of Safety and Security Charles Nqakula.

== Unit Insignia ==
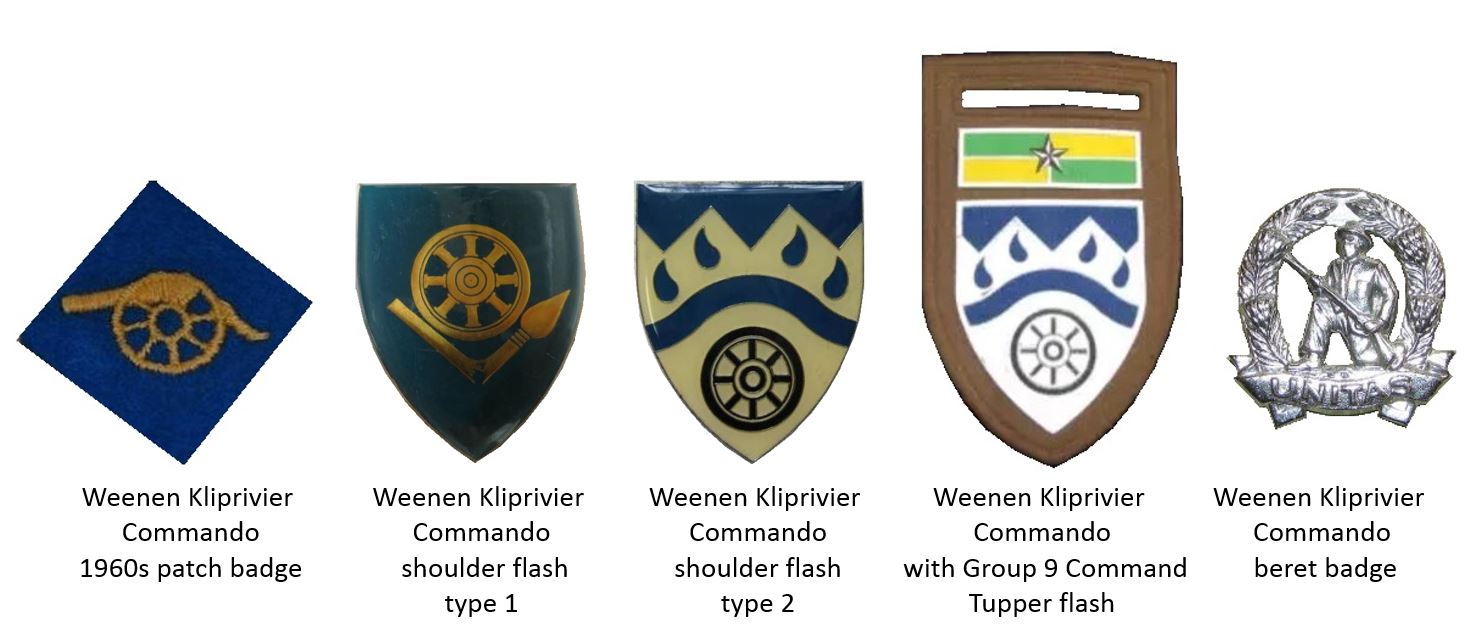
SADF era Weenen Kliprivier Commando insignia

== Leadership ==
- Cmdt A.W. Pretorius 1948-1965
- Capt J.H. Hattingh 1966-1967
- Cmdt J.J. van der Merwe 1967-1967
- Cmdt P.J. Meyer 1967-1969
- Cmdt H.S. van der Merwe 1969-1979
- Cmdt T.E. Southey 1979-1982
- Cmdt A.I. Odendaal 1982-1988
- Cmdt J.P. Verster 1988-1989
- Lt Col S.H. du Plessis 1989-1995
- Lt Col J.P. Verster 1995-2002
- Lt Col M.A. Pitout 2003 - 2007

== See also ==
- South African Commando System
