= Edward van Weenen =

Australian philatelist

- Born: Edward D. E. van Weenen; 1847
- Died: 28 July, 1925 (aged 77–78)
- Occupation: Philatelist

Edward D. E. van Weenen (1847 – 28 July 1925) was an Australian philatelist who signed the Roll of Distinguished Philatelists in 1925.
