= List of ornithology journals =

The following is a list of notable journals and magazines relating to birding and ornithology. The continent and country columns give the location where the journal or magazine is published and may not correspond with its scope or content.

Name	Organisation	Continent	Country	First volume	Last volume	JCR Index	JCR 2020	
Acrocephalus	Bird Watching & Bird Study Association	Europe	Slovenia			NA	--	
Acta Ornithologica	Polish Academy of Sciences	Europe	Poland	1933	present	Yes	1.051	
Africa Geographic, Birds & Birding	Africa Geographic	Africa	South Africa	2011	2012	NA	--	
Airo	SPEA	Europe	Portugal	1990	present	NA	--	
Alabama Birdlife	Alabama Ornithological Society	North America	US	1953	present	NA	--	
Alauda	Société d'Etudes Ornithologiques de France	Europe	France	1990	present	NA	--	
Alula		Europe	Finland	1995	2008	NA	--	
Anuari Ornitològic de les Balears	Balearic Group of Ornithology and Defence of Nature (El GOB)	Europe	Spain	1985	present	NA	--	
Aquila		Europe	Hungary	1894	present	NA	--	
Ardea	Netherlands Ornithologists' Union	Europe	Netherlands	1912	present	Yes	1.200	
Ardeola	Spanish Ornithological Society	Europe	Spain	1954	present	Yes	0.912	
Atualidades Ornitológicas		South America	Brazil	1984	present	NA	--	
Audubon	National Audubon Society	North America	US	1899	present	NA	--	
Aves Ichnusae	Sardinian Ornithological Group/ GOS	Europe	Italy	1998	present	NA	--	
The Austral Avian Record		Europe	UK	1912	1927	NA	--	
Australian Field Ornithology	BirdLife Australia	Australasia	Australia	1959	present	NA	--	
Avian Conservation and Ecology	Society of Canadian Ornithologists	North America	Canada	2005	present	NA	--	
Avian Research	Chinese Ornithological Society	Asia	China		present	Yes	1.215	
Avian Science	European Ornithologists' Union	Europe		2001	2003	NA	--	
Avicultural Magazine	Aviculture Society	Europe			present	NA	--	
Avifauna		Europe	Italy			NA	--	
Avocetta	Centro Italiano Studi Ornitologici	Europe	Italy	1926		NA	--	
Backyard Bird Newsletter		North America				NA	--	
Bird Conservation	American Bird Conservancy	The Americas	US		present	NA	--	
Bird Conservation International	BirdLife International	Europe	UK	1991	present	Yes	1.846	
Bird Observer		North America	US	1973	present	NA		
Birds of Silesia	Górnośląskie Koło Ornitologiczne	Europe	Poland	1982	present	NA	--	
Birds	MDPI	Europe	Switzerland	2020	present	Yes	1.4	
Bird Research	Japan Bird Research Association	Asia	Japan	2005	present	NA	--	
Bird Study	British Trust for Ornithology	Europe	UK	1954	present	Yes	0.952	
Bird Watcher's Digest	Bird Watcher's Digest	North America	US	1987	2021 ("Reborn" as BWD in 2022)	NA	--	
Bird Watching (magazine)	Bauer Media Group	Europe	UK	1986	present	NA	--	
BirdWatching (formerly Birder's World)	Madavor Media	North America	US	1987	2023	NA	--	
Birding	American Birding Association	North America	US	1969	present	NA	--	
Birding Business	Longdown Management	North America	US		present	NA	--	
Birding Scotland	Alba Ecology Ltd	Europe	Scotland	1998	2004	NA	--	
Birding World	Bird Information Service	Europe	UK	1988	2014	NA	--	
BirdingASIA	Oriental Bird Club	Europe	UK	2004	present	NA	--	
Birds & Blooms	Trusted Media Brands	Miscellaneous		1995	present	NA	--	
Birdwatch	Warners Group	Europe	UK	1992	present	NA	--	
Bliki: Journal on Icelandic birdlife	Icelandic Institute of Natural History	Europe	Iceland		present	NA	--	
British Birds	The British Birds Charitable Trust	Europe	UK	1907	present	NA	--	
Buceros	Bombay Natural History Society	Asia	India	1996	Present	NA	--	
Bulletin of the African Bird Club	African Bird Club	Europe	UK	1994	present	NA	--	
Bulletin of the British Ornithologists' Club	British Ornithologists' Club	International	UK	1882	present	NA	--	
Buteo	Czech Society for Ornithology	Europe				NA	--	
BW-Rivista italiana di Birdwatching		Europe	Italy			NA	--	
BWD: Bird Watcher's Digest	Big Year LLC	North America	US	2022	present	NA	--	
Canadian Field-Naturalist	Ottawa Field-Naturalists' Club	North America	Canada	1880	present	NA	--	
Cassinia	Delaware Valley Ornithological Club	North America	US	1901	present	NA	--	
The Chat	Carolina Bird Club	North America	US	1937	present	NA	--	
Ciconia	Bird Study and Protection Society of Serbia	Europe	Serbia	1989	present	NA	--	
Columba		Europe				NA	--	
The Connecticut Warbler	Connecticut Ornithological Association	North America	US	1981	present	NA	--	
Corella	Australian Bird Study Association	Australasia				NA	--	
Cork Bird Report	Birdwatch Cork	Europe	Ireland	1963	2009	NA	--	
Cotinga	Neotropical Bird Club	Europe	UK	1994	present	NA	--	
Crex		Europe				NA	--	
Der Falke	AULA-Verlag GmbH	Europe	Germany			NA	--	
Dutch Birding	Dutch Birding Association	Europe	The Netherlands	1979	present	NA	--	
El Hornero	Aves Argentinas/Asociación Ornitológica del Plata	South America	Argentina	1917	present	NA	--	
Emu	Royal Australasian Ornithologists Union	Australasia	Australia	1901	present	Yes	1.493	
‘Elepaio	Hawaii Audubon Society	North America	US		present	NA	--	
Florida Field Naturalist	Florida Ornithological Society	North America	US	1973	present	NA	--	
Forktail	Oriental Bird Club	Asia		1986	2014	NA	--	
Gli Uccelli d'Italia		Europe	Italy	1976	present	NA	--	
Hirundo	Estonian Ornithological Society	Europe	Estonia	1988	present	NA	--	
Huitzil, Revista Mexicana de Ornitología	Sociedad para el Estudio y Conservación de las Aves en México	North America	Mexico	2000	present	NA	--	
Ibis	British Ornithologists' Union	Europe	UK	1859	present	Yes	2.076	
Indian Birds	New Ornis Foundation	Asia	India	2004	present	NA	--	
Irish Birding News		Europe	Ireland		defunct	NA	--	
Irish Birds	BirdWatch Ireland	Europe	Ireland	1977	present	NA	--	
Japanese Journal of Ornithology		Asia	Japan			NA	--	
Journal of Avian Biology	Nordic Society Oikos	Europe	Sweden	1970	present	Yes	1.799	--
Journal of Caribbean Ornithology	BirdsCaribbean	The Americas	US	1988	present	NA	--	
Journal of Field Ornithology	Association of Field Ornithologists	North America	US	1925	present	Yes	1.266	
Journal of Ornithology	Deutsche Ornithologen-Gesellschaft	Europe	Germany	1853	present	Yes	1.286	
Journal of Raptor Research	Raptor Research Foundation	North America	US	1967	present	Yes	0.849	
Journal of the Yamashina Institute for Ornithology		Asia				NA	--	
The Kentucky Warbler	Kentucky Ornithological Society	North America	US	1925	present	NA	--	
Kingbird	New York State Ornithological Association	North America	US		present	NA	--	
The Korean Journal of Ornithology	The Ornithological Society of Korea	Asia	South Korea	1994	present	NA	--	
Kukila		Asia				NA	--	
Larus	Institute of Ornithology Croatian Academy of Sciences and Arts	Europe	Croatia	1947	present	NA	--	
Living Bird	Cornell Lab of Ornithology	North America	US	1962	Present	NA	--	
The Loon	Minnesota Ornithologists' Union	North America	US	1929	Present	NA	--	
Malimbus		Africa				NA	--	
Marine Ornithology	ASG/PSG/ASG/TSG/NZG/JSG	International		1976	present	NA	--	
Maryland Birdlife	Maryland Ornithological Society	North America	US	1945	present	NA	--	
Michigan Birds and Natural History	Michigan Audubon	North America	US	1994	2020	NA	--	
The Migrant	Tennessee Ornithological Society	North America	US	1930	present	NA	--	
Mississippi Kite	Mississippi Ornithological Society	North America	US	1965	present	NA	--	
Nebraska Bird Review	Nebraska Ornithologists' Union	North America	US	1933	present	NA	--	
Neotropical Birding	Neotropical Bird Club	Europe	UK		present	NA	--	
Newsletter for Birdwatchers		Asia	India	1960	present	NA	--	
North American Bird Bander	Western, Inland, and Eastern Bird Banding Associations	North America	US	1976	present	NA	--	
North American Birds		North America				NA	--	
Nos oiseaux	Société romande pour l'étude et la protection des oiseaux	Europe	Switzerland	1913	present	NA	--	
Notornis (originally New Zealand Bird Notes)	Ornithological Society of New Zealand	Australasia	New Zealand	1943	present	NA	--	
OFO News	Ontario Field Ornithologists	North America	Canada	1983	present	NA	--	
The Ohio Cardinal	Ohio Ornithological Society	North America	US	1978	present	NA	--	
Ontario Birds	Ontario Field Ornithologists	North America	Canada	1983	present	NA	--	
Oregon Birds	Oregon Birding Association	North America	US	1975	present	NA	--	
Ornis Fennica	BirdLife Finland	Europe	Finland	1924	present	Yes	0.771	
Ornis Hungarica	MME - Bird Life Hungary	Europe	Hungary	1991	present	NA	--	
Ornis Svecica	BirdLife Sverige (former Swedish Ornithological Society)	Europe	Sweden	1991	present	NA	--	
Ornithological Monographs	American Ornithologists' Union	North America	US	1964	2014	NA	--	
Ornithological Science		Asia	Japan	2002	present	Yes	0.705	
Ornithology (formerly The Auk)	American Ornithological Society	North America	US	1884	present	Yes	2.114	
Ornithologische Mitteilungen		Europe	Germany			NA	--	
Ornithos	LPO France	Europe	France	1994	present	NA	--	
Ornitologia Neotropical	Neotropical Ornithological Society	South America		1990	present	Yes	0.293	
Ornitología Colombiana	Asociación Colombiana de Ornitología	South America			present	NA	--	
Ornithological Applications (formerly The Condor)	Cooper Ornithological Society (until 2016) American Ornithological Society (since 2016)	North America	US	1899	present	Yes	2.628	
Ostrich	BirdLife South Africa	Africa	South Africa	1930	present	Yes	0.628	
Otus		Europe				NA	--	
Pacific Seabirds	Pacific Seabird Group	North America	US	1974	present	NA	--	
Panurus		Europe	Czech Republic			NA	--	
Passenger Pigeon	Wisconsin Society for Ornithology	North America	US	1939	present	NA	--	
Pennsylvania Birds	Pennsylvania Society for Ornithology	North America	US	1987	present	NA	--	
Picus		Europe	Italy			NA	--	
Podoces	WESCA Wildlife Network	Asia	Iran	2006	Present	NA	--	
Quaderni di Birdwatching		Europe	Italy			NA	--	
Québec Oiseaux	Regroupement QuébecOiseaux	North America	Canada			NA	--	
Raptors Conservation	Siberian Environmental Center	Eurasia	Russia	2005	present	NA	--	
The Raven	Virginia Society of Ornithology	North America	US, VA	1930	present	NA	--	
The Redstart	Brooks Bird Club	North America	US, WV	1933	present	NA	--	
Ornithology Research (formerly Revista Brasileira de Ornitologia or Ararajuba)	Brazilian Ornithological Society (SBO)	South America	Brazil	1987	present	Yes	0.387	
Revista Catalana d'Ornitologia	Catalan Ornithological Institute	Europe	Spain	1981	present	NA	--	
Ringing & Migration	British Trust for Ornithology	Europe	UK	1975	present	NA	--	
Rivista Italia di Ornitologia		Europe	Italy	1911	present	NA	--	
The Russian Journal of Ornithology		Europe	Russia	1992		NA	--	
Sandgrouse	Ornithological Society of the Middle East	Middle East	United Kingdom	1980	present	NA	--	
Scopus	East Africa Natural History Society	Africa				NA	--	
Scottish Birds	The Scottish Ornithologists' Club	Europe	Scotland	1958	present	NA	--	
Sitta	Stazione Ornitologica Lombarda	Europe	Italy	1987		NA	--	
Siyoth	Field Ornithology Group of Sri Lanka	Asia	Sri Lanka			NA	--	
Sluka		Europe				NA	--	
South Australian Ornithologist	South Australian Ornithological Association	South Australia	Australia	1914	present	NA	--	
South Dakota Bird Notes	South Dakota Ornithologists' Union	North America	US	1949	present	NA	--	
Stilt	Australasian Wader Studies Group	Australasia	Australia	1981	present	NA	--	
Strix	Wild Bird Society of Japan	Asia	Japan			NA	--	
Sylvia	Czech Society for Ornithology	Europe	Czech Republic	1936	present	NA	--	
Tattler	Australasian Wader Studies Group	Australasia	Australia	2006	present	NA	--	
Te Manu	Société d'Ornithologie de Polynésie	Oceania	French Polynesia	1992	present	NA	--	
Tichodroma	Slovak Ornithological Society	Europe	Slovakia	1987	present	NA	--	
Utah Birds	Utah Ornithological Society	North America	US		2010	NA	--	
Virginia Birds	Virginia Society of Ornithology	North America	US	2004	present	NA	--	
Die Vogelwelt		Europe	Germany	1990	present	NA	--	
Wader Study	International Wader Study Group	International		2015	present	NA	--	
Wader Study Group Bulletin	International Wader Study Group	International		1970	2014	NA	--	
Waterbirds	Waterbird Society	North America	US		present	Yes	0.584	
Western Birds	Western Field Ornithologists	North America	US	1970	present	NA	--	
Wilson Journal of Ornithology	Wilson Ornithological Society	North America	US	1888	present	Yes	0.574	
Wildfowl	Wildfowl & Wetlands Trust	Europe		1948	present	NA	--	
Wingspan	Royal Australasian Ornithologists Union	Australasia		1991	2012	NA	--	
BirdLife: The Magazine	BirdLife International	Europe				NA	--	

== See also ==
- List of wildlife magazines
