= List of ornithological societies =

The following is a list of regional ornithological societies.

== Africa ==
South Africa

- BirdLife South Africa

== Asia ==
India

- Bombay Natural History Society (BNHS): Located at Mumbai (formerly Bombay).
- Sálim Ali Centre for Ornithology and Natural History (SACON) Located near Coimbatore.

Japan

- Wild Bird Society of Japan (WBSJ)
- Yamashina Institute for Ornithology

South Korea

- Birds Korea

== Caribbean ==
- BirdsCaribbean

Dominican Republic

- Hispaniolan Ornithological Society

== Europe ==
Danmark

- Danish Ornithological Union (Dansk Ornitologisk Forening, DOF)

France

- Ligue_pour_la_protection_des_oiseaux (LPO)

Germany

- Deutsche Ornithologen-Gesellschaft

Hungary

- Hungarian Ornithological and Nature Conservation Society (Magyar Madártani és Természetvédelmi Egyesület, MME)

Italy

- Italian Bird Protection League (Lega Italiana Protezione Uccelli, LIPU)

Norway

- Norwegian Ornithological Society (Norsk Ornitologisk Forening, NOF)

Poland

- Polish Society for the Protection of Birds (Ogólnopolskie Towarzystwo Ochrony Ptaków, OTOP)

Spain

- Spanish Ornithological Society (Sociedad Española de Ornitología, SEO)
- Catalan Ornithological Institute (Institut Català d'Ornitologia, ICO)

Sweden

- Swedish Ornithological Union (Sveriges ornitologiska förening, SOF)

Switzerland

- Swiss Ornithological Institute (Vogelwarte)

United Kingdom

- British Ornithologists' Club
- British Ornithologists' Union (BOU)
- British Trust for Ornithology (BTO)
- British Birds Rarities Committee
- Royal Society for the Protection of Birds (RSPB)
- Scottish Ornithologists' Club
- Wildfowl and Wetlands Trust (WWT)

== North America ==
Canada

- Bird Studies Canada
- Society of Canadian Ornithologists
- British Columbia Field Ornithologists

Mexico

USA

- American Birding Association
- American Ornithological Society (Formed in 2016 by the merger of the American Ornithologists' Union and the Cooper Ornithological Society)
- Association of Field Ornithologists
- Baird Ornithological Club
- Cornell Laboratory of Ornithology
- National Audubon Society
- Ornithological Council
- Pacific Seabird Group
- Raptor Research Foundation
- Rocky Mountain Raptor Program
- Waterbird Society
- Wilson Ornithological Society

== Oceania ==
Australia

- Birds Australia

New Zealand

- Ornithological Society of New Zealand
- Royal Forest and Bird Protection Society of New Zealand
