= List of state ornithological organizations in the United States =

This is a list of notable state-level ornithological organizations in the United States.

- Florida – Florida Ornithological Society
- Georgia – Georgia Ornithological Society
- Hawaii – Hawaii Audubon Society
- Illinois – Illinois Ornithological Society
- Nevada – Great Basin Bird Observatory
- New York – New York State Ornithological Association
- North Carolina – Carolina Bird Club
- South Carolina – Carolina Bird Club
- Tennessee – Tennessee Ornithological Society

== See also ==
- List of ornithological societies
