= Kingbird (disambiguation) =

Kingbirds are birds of the genus Tyrannus in the tyrant flycatcher family.

Kingbird may also refer to:

- Curtiss Kingbird, an airplane built in the early 1930s
- USS Kingbird, several ships with the same name
- The Kingbird, the scholarly journal of the New York State Ornithological Association
