= Anthony J. Gaston =

- Born: 1946 (age 79–80); Croydon, England
- Education: Clare College, Cambridge (BA); Oriel College, Oxford (PhD)
- Known for: Research on thick-billed murres and ancient murrelets Surveys leading to the Great Himalayan National Park
- Spouse: Anne-Marie Gaston (d. 2018)
- Awards: Doris Huestis Speirs Award (2007); Jamie Smith Memorial Mentoring Award (2013)
- Scientific career
- Fields: Ornithology; Seabird ecology
- Workplaces: Canadian Wildlife Service, Environment Canada; Queen's University; Laskeek Bay Conservation Society

Anthony J. Gaston (born 1946) is an English-born ornithologist and author who worked as a research scientist with Environment Canada from 1980 to 2014. He is known for long-term studies of seabirds, particularly thick-billed murres in the Canadian Arctic and ancient murrelets in Haida Gwaii. He also led wildlife surveys in Himachal Pradesh, India, that recommended the site of the Great Himalayan National Park.

== Early life and education ==
Gaston was born in Croydon, England, and began bird banding at the age of 11. He received a BA in physical anthropology from Clare College, Cambridge, and participated in anthropological expeditions in Iran and South Asia between 1969 and 1975.

From 1970 to 1976, he studied for a PhD in zoology at Oriel College, Oxford.

In a 1978 paper on group territorial behaviour and cooperative breeding, Gaston proposed that subordinate helpers may assist dominant breeders in return for being allowed to remain on their territory. The idea later became known as the "pay-to-stay" hypothesis.

== Career ==
=== Himalayas ===
In 1979, Gaston founded and headed the Himachal Wildlife Project and conducted wildlife surveys in Himachal Pradesh. At the invitation of the state government, he led a team of Indian and international wildlife biologists that surveyed the western Himalayas in the early 1980s to identify a possible site for the state's first national park.

The ecologist Malcolm L. Hunter Jr. participated in surveys in the spring and autumn of 1980. Although the state government had considered the Manali area, Gaston's team recommended the upper Tirthan and Sainj valleys. A notification of intent to establish Great Himalayan National Park was issued in 1984, followed by its final notification in 1999. The park was inscribed on the UNESCO World Heritage List in 2014.

In 2019, Gaston and Sanjeeva Pandey published The Great Himalayan National Park: The Struggle to Save the Western Himalayas.

=== Canadian Arctic ===
Gaston worked on short-term contracts for Environment Canada from 1975 to 1977 and was employed there from 1980 until April 2014, when he took retirement. His research on thick-billed murres and other seabirds covered at least nine colonies in the eastern Canadian Arctic, including Akpatok Island, Coats Island, Coburg Island, Digges Island, and Prince Leopold Island.

In 1981, with David N. Nettleship, he wrote a Canadian Wildlife Service monograph, The Thick-billed Murres of Prince Leopold Island.

Gaston began studying the murre colony on Coats Island in northern Hudson Bay in 1984. Research by his team found that as sea ice retreated, Arctic cod, historically an important food source for seabirds and their chicks, was increasingly replaced by capelin and sand lance moving northward. His studies found that murre chicks feeding on capelin grew more slowly. He also documented mortality among murres during periods of unusually warm weather.

=== Haida Gwaii ===
In 1984, Gaston began a long-term research programme on ancient murrelets on Reef Island in Haida Gwaii, British Columbia. The Laskeek Bay Conservation Society was established in 1990, when local volunteers continued the research and established a research station on East Limestone Island. Gaston has served as the society's research director.

He established nest boxes for ancient murrelets on Reef and Limestone islands. Research by Gaston and colleagues on East Limestone Island found that three raccoons killed at least 11 percent of the island's breeding ancient murrelets in 1991. After the raccoons were removed in 1992, the number of chicks leaving the colony increased by 20 percent.

Gaston has also studied the ancient murrelet's trans-Pacific migration. After breeding in Haida Gwaii, the birds travel across the Pacific to waters off China and Japan by early autumn.

In 1997, he expanded his Haida Gwaii research to examine the ecological effects of introduced Sitka black-tailed deer. His collaboration with French ecologist Jean-Louis Martin of the CNRS led to the Research Group on Introduced Species, whose participants included the Laskeek Bay Conservation Society, the Gwaii Haanas Archipelago Management Board and the Canadian Wildlife Service. The group's research contributed to deer culls on Reef Island and at SGang Gwaay.

In 2022, a black oystercatcher that Gaston had banded as a chick on Limestone Island in June 1995 was found on Gooden Island in Skidegate Inlet at the age of 27. It was reported as the oldest black oystercatcher on record.

=== Editorial and academic work ===
Gaston was editor-in-chief of the journal Marine Ornithology from 1999 to 2012 and later served as its managing editor. He was also an adjunct professor in the Department of Biology at Queen's University in Kingston, Ontario.

== Personal life ==
Gaston was married to Anne-Marie Gaston (1941–2018), a classical Indian dancer who performed under the stage name Anjali. He regularly narrated her dance performances, and the couple co-wrote a chapter on dance for The Oxford Handbook of Religion and the Arts (2014).

Gaston has also published poetry.

== Selected works ==
- Gaston, A. J.; Nettleship, D. N. (1981). The Thick-billed Murres of Prince Leopold Island. Canadian Wildlife Service Monograph Series. Vol. 6. Ottawa: Canadian Wildlife Service.
- Gaston, Anthony J. (1992). The Ancient Murrelet: A Natural History in the Queen Charlotte Islands. London: T & AD Poyser. ISBN 0-85661-070-4.
- Gaston, Anthony J.; Jones, Ian L. (1998). The Auks: Alcidae. Bird Families of the World. Oxford: Oxford University Press. ISBN 0-19-854032-9.
- Gaston, Anthony J. (2004). Seabirds: A Natural History. New Haven: Yale University Press. ISBN 0-300-10406-5.
- Gaston, Anthony J.; Golumbia, Todd E.; Martin, Jean-Louis; Sharpe, Sean T., eds. (2008). Lessons from the Islands: Introduced Species and What They Tell Us About How Ecosystems Work. Ottawa: Canadian Wildlife Service, Environment Canada. ISBN 978-0-662-45995-8.
- Richards, James M.; Gaston, Anthony J., eds. (2018). Birds of Nunavut. Vancouver: UBC Press. ISBN 978-0-7748-6024-6.
- Pandey, Sanjeeva; Gaston, Anthony J. (2019). The Great Himalayan National Park: The Struggle to Save the Western Himalayas. Niyogi Books. ISBN 978-93-86906-71-7.
- Gaston, Anthony (2022). A Raven Conspiracy. Laskeek Bay Conservation Society.

== Awards and honours ==
Gaston became an elective member of the American Ornithologists' Union, now the American Ornithological Society, in 1988 and was elected a fellow in 2000.

The Society of Canadian Ornithologists awarded him the Doris Huestis Speirs Award for his contributions to Canadian ornithology in 2007 and the Jamie Smith Memorial Mentoring Award in 2013.
