= NYSARC =

NYSARC may refer to:

- New York State Appalachian Regional Commission, a regional economic development agency
- New York State Association of Regional Councils, ten regional councils throughout New York State
- New York State Avian Records Committee, committee of the New York State Ornithological Association

It may also refer to:

- The Arc New York, an organization in New York State serving people with developmental disabilities
