= Hemicrambe fruticosa =

Conservation status
- Vulnerable (IUCN 3.1)

Scientific classification
- Kingdom: Plantae
- Clade: Tracheophytes
- Clade: Angiosperms
- Clade: Eudicots
- Clade: Rosids
- Order: Brassicales
- Family: Brassicaceae
- Genus: Hemicrambe
- Species: H. fruticosa

Binomial name
- Hemicrambe fruticosa (C.C.Towns.) Gómez-Campo (1977 publ. 1978)

Synonyms
- Fabrisinapis fruticosus C.C.Towns. (1971); Hemicrambe townsendii Gómez-Campo (1977), nom. superfl.

Species of flowering plant

Hemicrambe fruticosa is a species of flowering plant in the family Brassicaceae. It is rare cliff-dwelling subshrub or shrub endemic to the Hajhir Mountains on Socotra island in Yemen. Less than one metre tall, it can easily be identified by its white flowers and small hanging fruit. It grows on vertical granite rock faces from 900 to 1000 metres elevation. It is currently unknown whether the overall population is growing or shrinking.
