= Grant's leaf-toed gecko =

Conservation status
- Near Threatened (IUCN 3.1)

Scientific classification
- Kingdom: Animalia
- Phylum: Chordata
- Class: Reptilia
- Order: Squamata
- Suborder: Gekkota
- Family: Gekkonidae
- Genus: Hemidactylus
- Species: H. granti

Binomial name
- Hemidactylus granti Boulenger, 1899
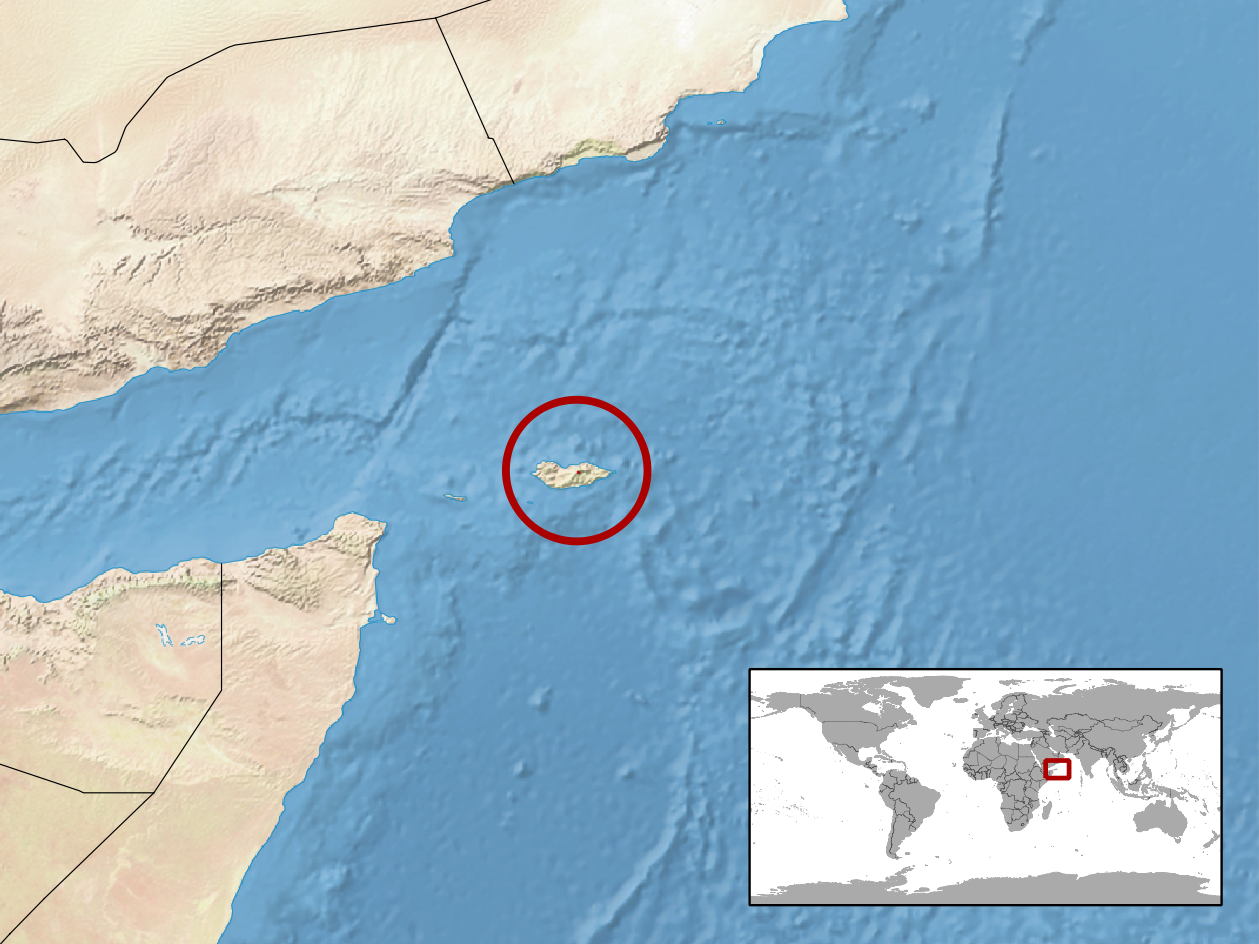

Species of lizard

Grant's leaf-toed gecko (Hemidactylus granti) is a species of gecko, a lizard in the family Gekkonidae. The species is endemic to the island Socotra. Usually it can be found camouflaging at rocky areas such as cliffs and mountain peaks.

== Etymology ==
The specific name, granti, is in honor of Scottish ornithologist William Robert Ogilvie-Grant.

== Geographic range ==
H. granti is found in the Hajhir Mountains of Socotra, Yemen.

== Habitat ==
The preferred natural habitat of H. granti is rocky areas, but not limestone, at altitudes of 970–1,463 m (3,182–4,800 ft).

== Reproduction ==
H. granti is oviparous. Eggs are laid in communal clutches of up to 80 eggs in rock fissures and under stones.
