= David Armitage Bannerman =

British ornithologist (1886–1979)

David Armitage Bannerman OBE FRSE FZS
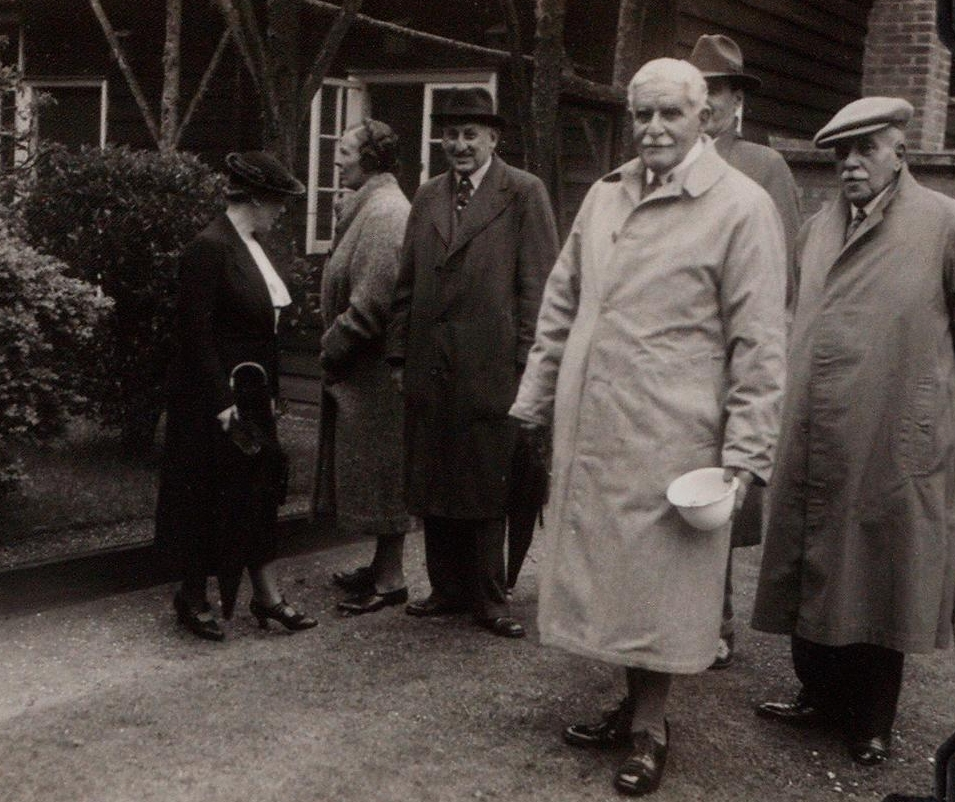
- Mrs Bannerman, a lady, David Bannerman, Alfred Ezra and Sir David Ezra in 1938
- Born: 27 November 1886
- Died: 6 April 1979 (aged 92)
- Occupation: Ornithologist
- Writing career
- Genre: Non-fiction
- Subject: Ornithology

David Armitage Bannerman (27 November 1886 – 6 April 1979) was a British ornithologist. From 1919 to 1952 he was Curator of the British Museum of Natural History (now called the Natural History Museum, London).

== Biography ==
He was the son of David Alexander Bannerman.

He was educated at Wellington College, Berkshire, before going to university.

After graduating from Pembroke College, Cambridge in 1909, Bannerman travelled extensively in Africa, the West Indies, South America and the Atlantic Islands.

Rejected on health grounds by the military, Bannerman served as a stretcher-bearer with the Red Cross for four years in France during World War I, earning the Mons Star. He was then employed, part-time, at the Natural History Museum, until his retirement in 1951, having twice declined the directorship of the British Museum. He was chairman of the British Ornithologists' Club from 1932 to 1935, having edited their Bulletin from 1914–1915 and was Vice President of the British Ornithologists Union and the Royal Society for the Protection of Birds.

He married twice: in 1911 he married Muriel Morgan(d.1945) and much later in life, in 1952, he married Winifred Mary Jane Holland (formerly the wife of D. B. Wyndham-Lewis and then of J. B. Priestley). The author Daniel Farson in his autobiography suggests intimacy between Bannerman and his mother Eve, wife of Negley Farson.

From 1952 to 1979 he farmed in Dumfriesshire.

He also wrote for Ibis.

== Bibliography ==
- The Birds of Tropical West Africa (illustrated by George Edward Lodge; 8 vols) 1930-1951
- The Birds of West and Equatorial Africa (2 vols) 1953
- Larger Birds of West Africa, Penguin (London) 1958
- Birds of Cyprus (with W. Mary Bannerman), Oliver & Boyd, Edinburgh 1958
- The Birds of the British Isles (illustrated by Lodge) Oliver and Boyd, Edinburgh (12 vols) 1953-1963
  - Vol. 1: Corvidae, Sturnidae, Oriolidae, Fringillidae, 1953
  - Vol. 2: Alaudidae, Certhidae, Paridae, Vireonidae etc, 1953
  - Vol. 3: Sylviidae, Troglodytidae, Turdidae, Cinclidae, Prunellidae, Hirundinidae, 1954
  - Vol. 4: Apodidae, Coraciidae, Caprimulgidae, Alcedinidae, Meropidae, Picidae, Upupidae, Cuculidae, Strigidae, 1955
  - Vol. 5: Birds of Prey, 1956
  - Vol. 6: Ciconiidae, Ardeidae, Phoenicopteridae, Anatidae (Part), 1957
  - Vol. 7: Anatidae (Conclusion), 1958
  - Vol. 8: Phalacrocoracidae, Diomedeidae, Sulidae, Podicipedidae, Fregatidae, Gaviidae, Procellariidae, Columbidae, Pteroclididae, 1959
  - Vol. 9: Scolopacidae (Part), 1961
  - Vol. 10: Scolopacidae (Conclusion), Charadriidae, Recurvirostridae, Haematopodidae, 1961
  - Vol. 11: Glareolidae, Otdidae, Burhinidae, Gruidae, Laridae, 1962
  - Vol. 12: Stercorariidae, Alcidae, Rallidae, Tetraonidae, Phasianidae, 1963
- The Birds of the Atlantic Islands (with W. Mary Bannerman, illustrated by D. M. Reid-Henry) Oliver and Boyd, Edinburgh (4 vols) 1963-1968 ISBN 0-05-001802-7
  - Vol. 1: A History of the Birds of the Canary Islands and the Salvages, 1963
  - Vol. 2: A History of the Birds of Madeira, the Desertas, and Porto Santo Islands, 1965
  - Vol. 3: A History of the Birds of the Azores, 1966
  - Vol. 4: A History of the Birds of the Cape Verde Islands, 1968
- Handbook of the Birds of Cyprus and Migrants of the Middle East (with W. Mary Bannerman) Oliver and Boyd, Edinburgh 1971 ISBN 978-0-05-002445-4
- Birds of the Maltese Archipelago (with Joseph A. Vella-Gaffiero) Museums Department, Valletta 1976
- The Birds of the Balearics' (with W. Mary Bannerman, illustrated by Donald Watson) Croom Helm/Tanager Books 1983 ISBN 978-0-88072-022-9
- The Canary Islands : their history, natural history and scenery Gurney and Jackson 1922

=== Contributions ===
- George Lodge - Artist Naturalist John Savory (Ed.), Croom Helm, 1986 ISBN 0-7099-3366-5
  - The chapter Lodge the Man, a Biography

=== Notable articles ===
- Exhibition and description of a new subspecies of oystercatcher (Haematopus niger meade-waldoi) from the Canary Islands. Bull. B. O. C. 31: 33–34. (1913)
- A probable sight record of a Canarian black oystercatcher. Ibis 111: 257. (1969)
