= Marine Ornithology =

Peer-reviewed academic journal

- Discipline: Bird conservation
- Language: English
- Edited by: David Ainley

Publication details
- History: 1976–present
- Frequency: Biannual
- Open access: Yes
- License: CC BY 4.0
- Impact factor: 0.6 (2022)

Standard abbreviations
- ISO 4: Mar. Ornithol.

Indexing
- ISSN: 1018-3337 (print); 2074-1235 (web)
- LCCN: 95643474

Links
- Journal homepage

Marine Ornithology is a biannual open-access peer-reviewed scientific journal published and supported by a partnership between the African, Australasian, Dutch, Japan and Pacific Seabird Groups. The editor-in-chief is David Ainley. The journal was originally published by John Cooper in November 1976 as a bulletin of the South African Seabird Group under the name The Cormorant. The journal's current title, Marine Ornithology, was obtained in 1990, following an expansion in scope to cover all seabirds, not only those in Africa.

== Abstracting and indexing ==
The journal is abstracted and indexed in:

- Directory of Open Access Journals
- Biological Abstracts
- BIOSIS Previews
- Current Contents/Agriculture, Biology & Environmental Sciences
- EBSCO databases
- Essential Science Indicators
- GEOBASE
- ProQuest databases
- Science Citation Index Expanded
- Scopus
- The Zoological Record

According to the Journal Citation Reports, the journal has a 2022 impact factor of 0.6.

== See also ==
- List of ornithology journals
