= Alula (disambiguation) =

An alula is a part of a bird's wing.

Alula may also refer to:

== Biology ==
- Brighamia insignis, a rare Hawaiian plant commonly known as "Alula"
- A part of an insect's wing; see insect wing#Fields

== Astronomy ==
- Alula Borealis, a star in the constellation Ursa Major; see Nu Ursae Majoris
- Alula Australis, a star in the constellation Ursa Major; see Xi Ursae Majoris

== Places ==
- Al-Ula, a region in north-western Saudi Arabia
- Alula, Somalia, a historic town in northeastern Somalia

== Other uses ==
- Ras Alula (d. 1897), a 19th-century Ethiopian general
- Alula (magazine), a defunct Finnish ornithological journal
- Alula, a fictional character from surreal puzzle adventure video game OneShot
