= JRR =

JRR may refer to:

- J. R. R. Tolkien (1892–1973), English writer, poet, philologist and university professor
- Jaime Robbie Reyne (born 1985), Australian singer
- Jay Robinson Racing, a racing team
- Jiru language
- Jackie Robinson (1919–1972), American baseball player
- Journal of Raptor Research, a peer-reviewed scientific journal covering birds of prey and raptor research
