= Birding Scotland =

Scottish Birding magazine founded in 1998

- Editor: Stuart Rivers, 10 Waverley Park, Edinburgh, EH8 8EU
- Categories: Ornithology
- Publisher: Pica Design, Aberdeen
- Founded: 1998
- Country: Scotland
- Website: Birding Scotland
- ISSN: 1461-9660

Birding Scotland is a quarterly Scottish birding magazine. The editors are H. I. Scott and Stuart Rivers.

The original advertising slogan was "Made in Scotland for birders", a take on the iconic Irn-Bru campaign "Made in Scotland from girders".

== See also ==
- List of journals and magazines relating to birding and ornithology
