= Acta Ornithologica =

- Discipline: Ornithology
- Language: English
- Edited by: Tomasz D. Mazgajski

Publication details
- Former name(s): Acta Ornithologica Musei Zoologici Polonici
- History: 1933–present
- Publisher: Polish Academy of Sciences (Poland)
- Frequency: Biannual
- Impact factor: 1.000 (2018)

Standard abbreviations
- ISO 4: Acta Ornithol.

Indexing
- ISSN: 0001-6454
- OCLC no.: 1477030

Links
- Journal homepage; Online access

Acta Ornithologica is an ornithological scientific periodical published in Poland (two issues per year) by the Polish Academy of Sciences. It is in English with summaries in Polish. It was established in 1933 as Acta Ornithologica Musei Zoologici Polonici and obtained its current name in 1953.

== See also ==
- List of ornithology journals
