= The Austral Avian Record =

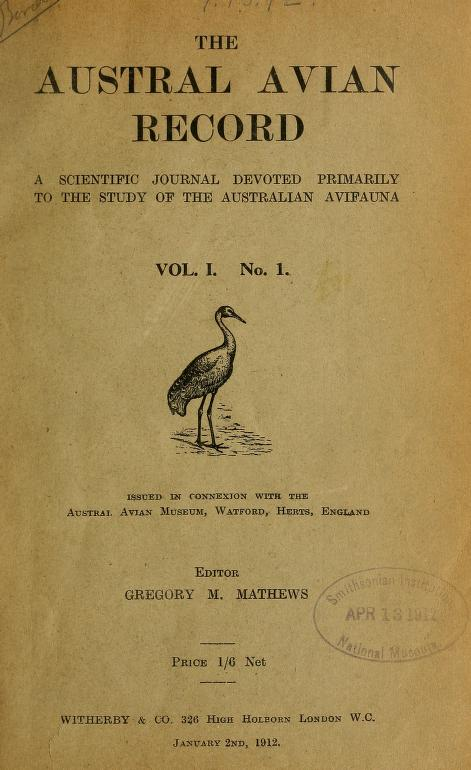
- Discipline: Ornithology
- Language: English

Publication details
- History: 1912–1927
- Publisher: H. F. & G. Witherby: London, for Gregory Mathews (United Kingdom)

Standard abbreviations
- ISO 4: Austral Avian Rec.

The Austral Avian Record, with the subtitle a scientific journal devoted primarily to the study of the Australian avifauna, was an occasional journal produced in five volumes between 1912 and 1927. It was founded, funded and edited by Australian ornithologist Gregory M. Mathews, who was also the main contributor. It was published by Witherby of London, and served as an adjunct to his monumental handbook, The Birds of Australia, which he began in 1910 and completed in 1927.

The journal was first issued on 2 January 1912, with the final issue (vol.5, no.5) dated 1 June 1927. In the editorial note that opened the first issue, Mathews explained:

”While preparing my Reference List to the Birds of Australia (now in the press), I accumulated many notes of great interest regarding matters that need investigation. In that Reference List I have shortly indicated some of these matters, but detailed accounts could not there be introduced. I have therefore decided to publish, at irregular intervals, such notes as I deem necessary to require immediate attention and referring to birds which either have been already treated of in my Birds of Australia or will not be dealt with in the immediate future. In this place it is proposed to indicate new forms, notes on nomenclature and any other interesting matter relating to the Australian avifauna.

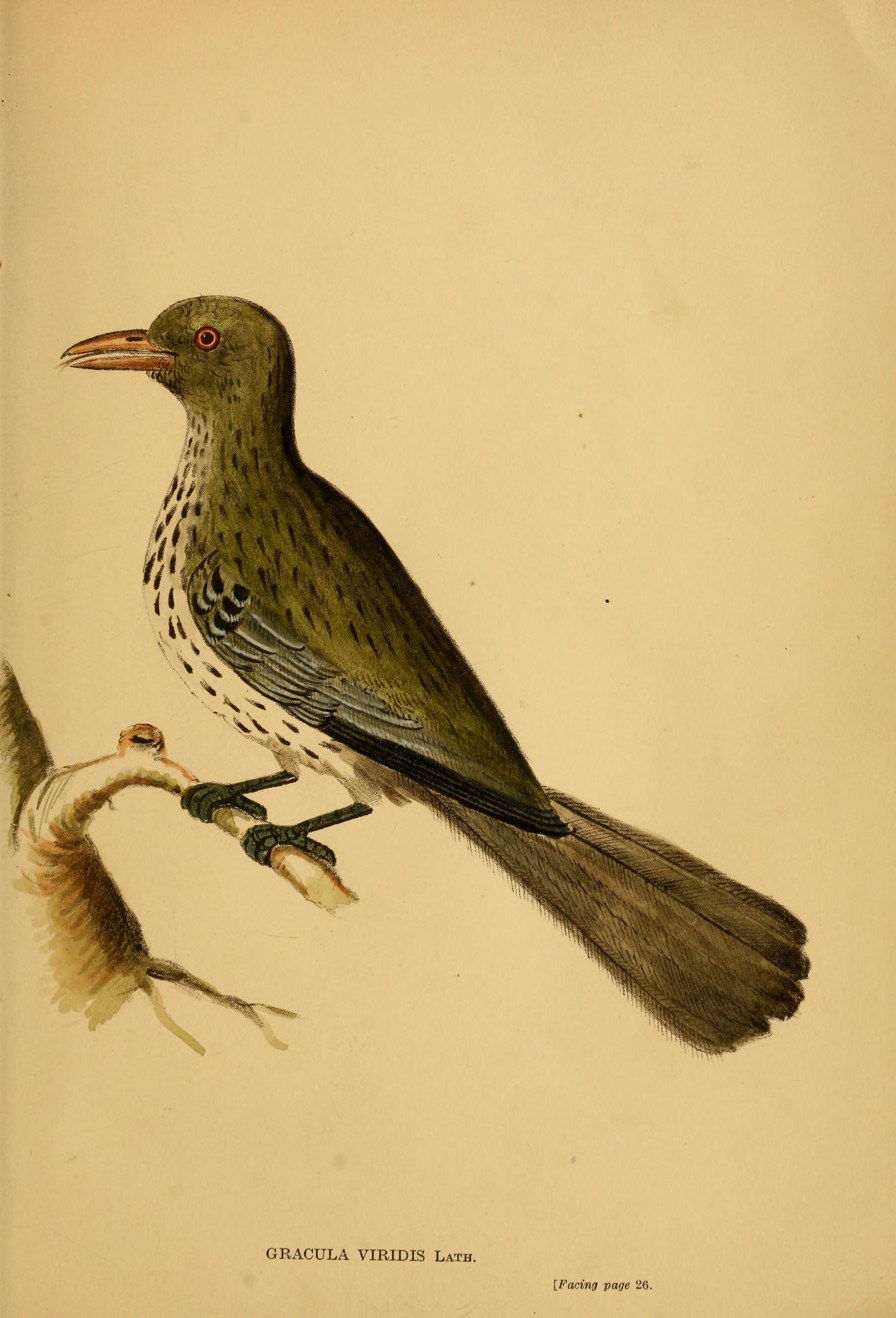
Illustration of olive-backed oriole (Oriolus sagittatus) using synonym Gracula viridis, published in the Austral Avian Record

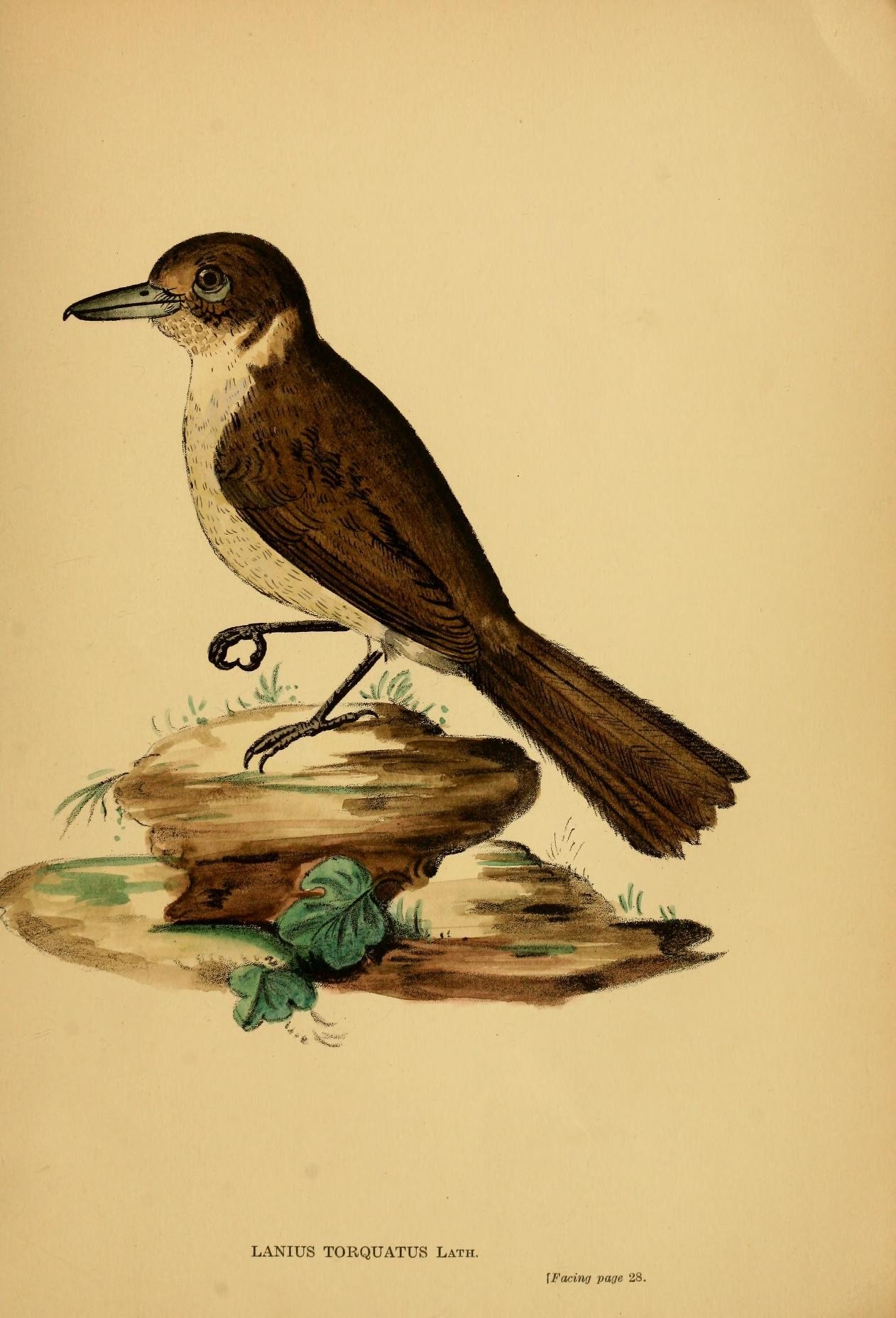
Illustration of grey butcherbird (Cracticus torquatus) using synonym Lanius torquatus, published in the Austral Avian Record

Additional information about the journal was also provided on the outer back cover of each part from vol.3 onwards, which stated that:

The Austral Avian Record is published at irregular intervals, about four times per year, in parts of about 24 pages each, and often with a coloured Plate; eight parts form a volume. Price per volume 12/- post free. The "Austral Avian Record" contains:

1. Discussions regarding the relationships and ranges of species and subspecies of particular genera, especially those not dealt with in Mathews' Birds of Australia
2. Revision of what has been published in the "Birds of Australia" when accession of material and new facts necessitate such revision
3. Description of new forms
4. Discussions regarding nomenclature
5. Supplements to the Reference List of the Birds of Australia
6. Dates of Publication of works about which any doubt exists

== See also ==
- List of journals and magazines relating to birding and ornithology
