= El Hornero =

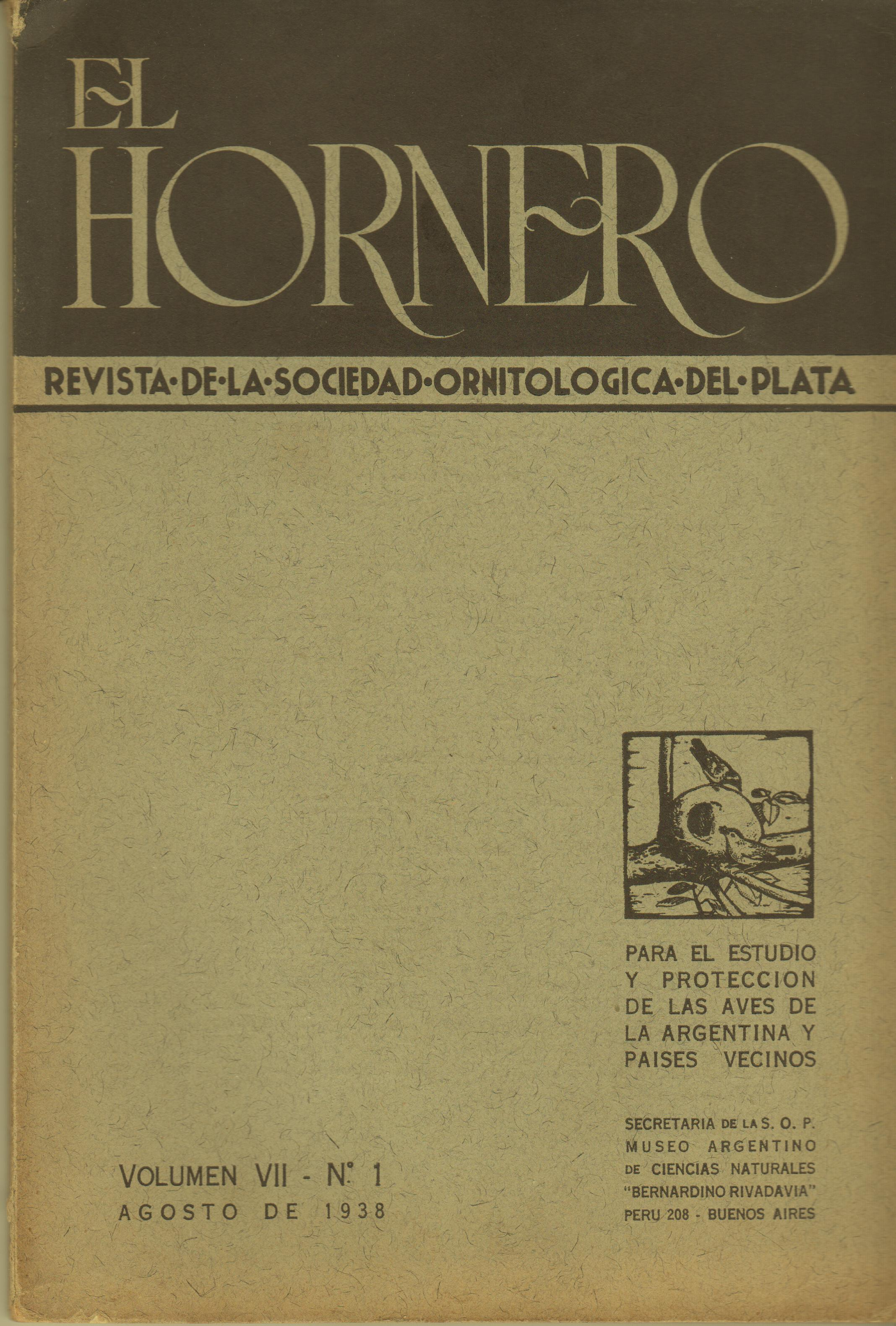
- August 1938 edition of El Hornero.
- Discipline: Ornithology
- Language: English - Español
- Edited by: Sergio Lambertucci

Publication details
- History: 1917–present
- Publisher: Department of Ecology, Genetics, and Evolution (Facultad de Ciencias Exactas y Naturales) of the Universidad de Buenos Aires (UBA) on behalf of Aves Argentinas-Asociación Ornitológica del Plata (Argentina)
- Frequency: Biannual

Standard abbreviations
- ISO 4: Hornero

Indexing
- ISSN: 0073-3407 (print); 1850-4884 (web)

Links
- Journal homepage

El Hornero, is the peer-reviewed scientific journal of Aves Argentinas-Asociación Ornitológica del Plata the dean of the ornithological institutions in Argentina.

== Meaning of the title ==
El Hornero is named for a popular Argentine bird, the hornero, which would be translated into English approximately as "ovenbird".

== Aims and scope ==
The journal publishes original research covering the whole field of avian biology, including empirical, methodological, and theoretical results in ecology, conservation, behavior, paleontology, and taxonomy of birds. The publication is oriented, though not restricted, to research on Neotropical birds. Written contributions are admitted in either Spanish or English.

== Editor and publisher ==
The editor-in-chief of El Hornero is Javier Lopez de Casenave. The journal is published by the Department of Ecology, Genetics, and Evolution (Facultad de Ciencias Exactas y Naturales) of the Universidad de Buenos Aires (UBA) in print and online on behalf of Aves Argentinas-Asociación Ornitológica del Plata.

== Indexed in ==
El Hornero is indexed in: Scopus, Biological Abstracts, Zoological Record, BIOSIS Previews, Latindex (Catálogo y Directorio), BINPAR (Bibliografía Nacional de Publicaciones Periódicas Argentinas Registradas), Catálogo Colectivo de Publicaciones Periódicas (CAICYT), Núcleo Básico de Revistas Científicas Argentinas, Ulrich's Periodicals Directory, OWL (Ornithological Worldwide Literature), and SciELO (Scientific Electronic Library Online).

== See also ==
- List of ornithology journals
