= Scopus (journal) =

Scopus: Journal of East African Ornithology
- Language: English
- Edited by: Darcy Ogada; Graeme Backhurst

Publication details
- History: 1977–present

Standard abbreviations
- ISO 4: Scopus

Indexing
- ISSN: 0250-4162 (print); 2313-1799 (web)

Links
- Journal homepage

Scopus: Journal of East African Ornithology is a peer-reviewed scientific journal on East African ornithology published by the Bird Committee of the East Africa Natural History Society. The journal was established in 1977 and the editor-in-chief is Mwangi Githiru.

== See also ==
- List of ornithology journals
