= Hajhir Mountains =

Mountain range situated on the island of Socotra, Yemen

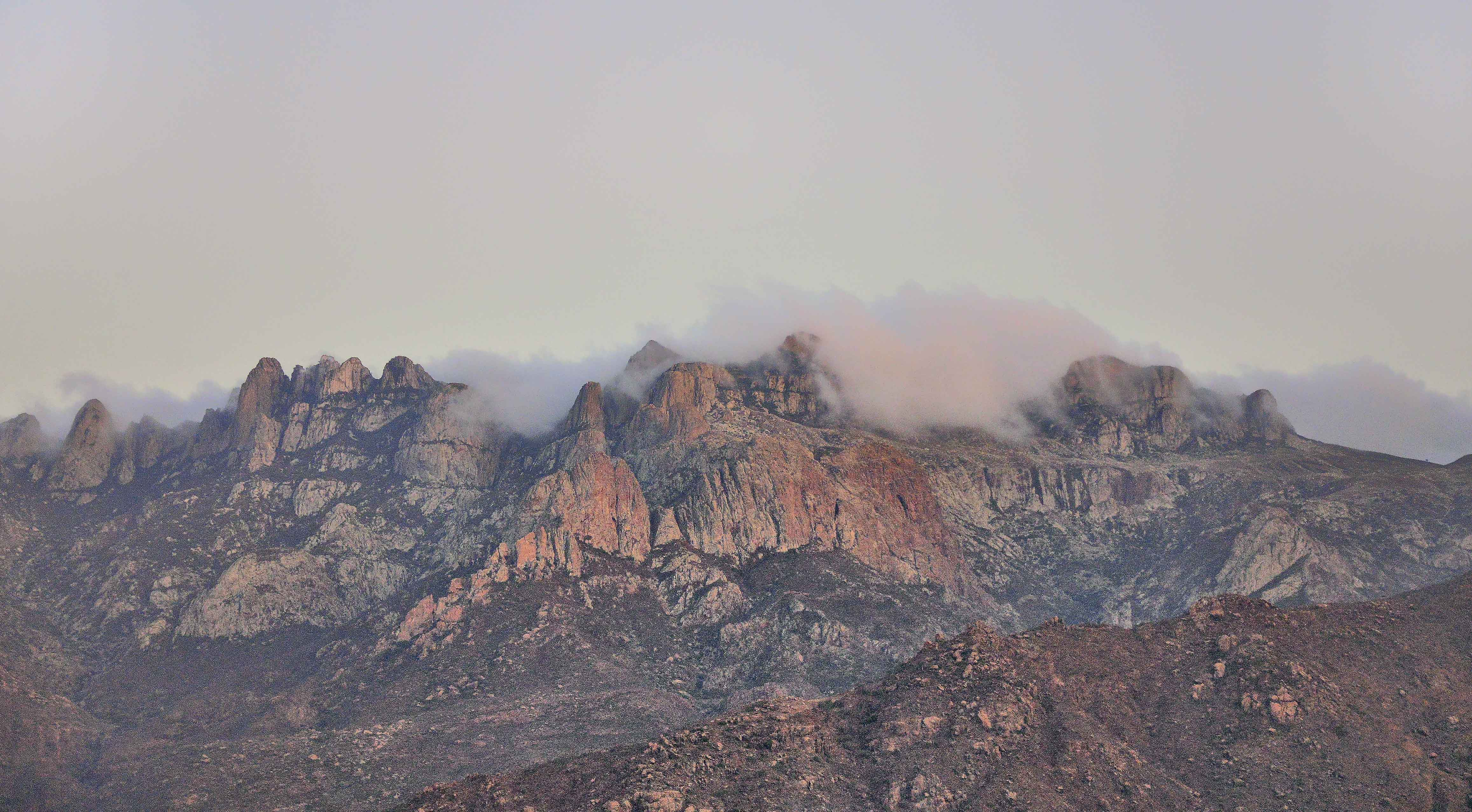
- View of the mountain range

Highest point
- Elevation: 1,519 m (4,984 ft)
- Coordinates: 12.582376°N 54.039919°E

Geography
- Location within Yemen
- Location: Socotra, Yemen
- Parent range: Hajhir Mountains

The Hajhir Mountains is a mountain range situated on the island of Socotra, Yemen. The mountain range reaches a height of 1,519 meters (4,984 ft) at Mount Scand, which is the tallest point of the island. There are 50 species on Socotra that are only found in the mountains. The mountain range has one of the highest density of endemic plants in southwest Asia and has a rural population.

== Geography ==
The Hajhir Mountains are located on the island of Socotra, an island belonging to Yemen, which broke off from the mainland 18 million years ago The Hajhir Mountains were created by volcanic activity. The mountains are the watershed of Socotra.

Mount Scand is the highest point of the mountains at 1,519 meters (4,984 ft) above sea level. The Hajhir massif is composed of granite and metamorphic rock. The northern face of the mountains have sheer cliffs while the southern and eastern faces have a slope. The cliffs of the northern face reach 400 to 600 metres in height.

== Environment ==
Socotra is noted for its unique and endemic species. 100 of Socotra's indigenous species are found in the mountains and 50 of these are only on the mountains. Dracaena cinnabari and Carex socotrana are found on the mountains. The mountains has one of the highest density of endemic plants in southwest Asia.

The area of the island in the shadow of the Hajhir Mountains experience more aridity. The peak of the mountains have an average rainfall of 300 mm greater than the lower areas.

== Population ==
A rural population led by muqaddam inhabit the mountain range.

== Gallery ==
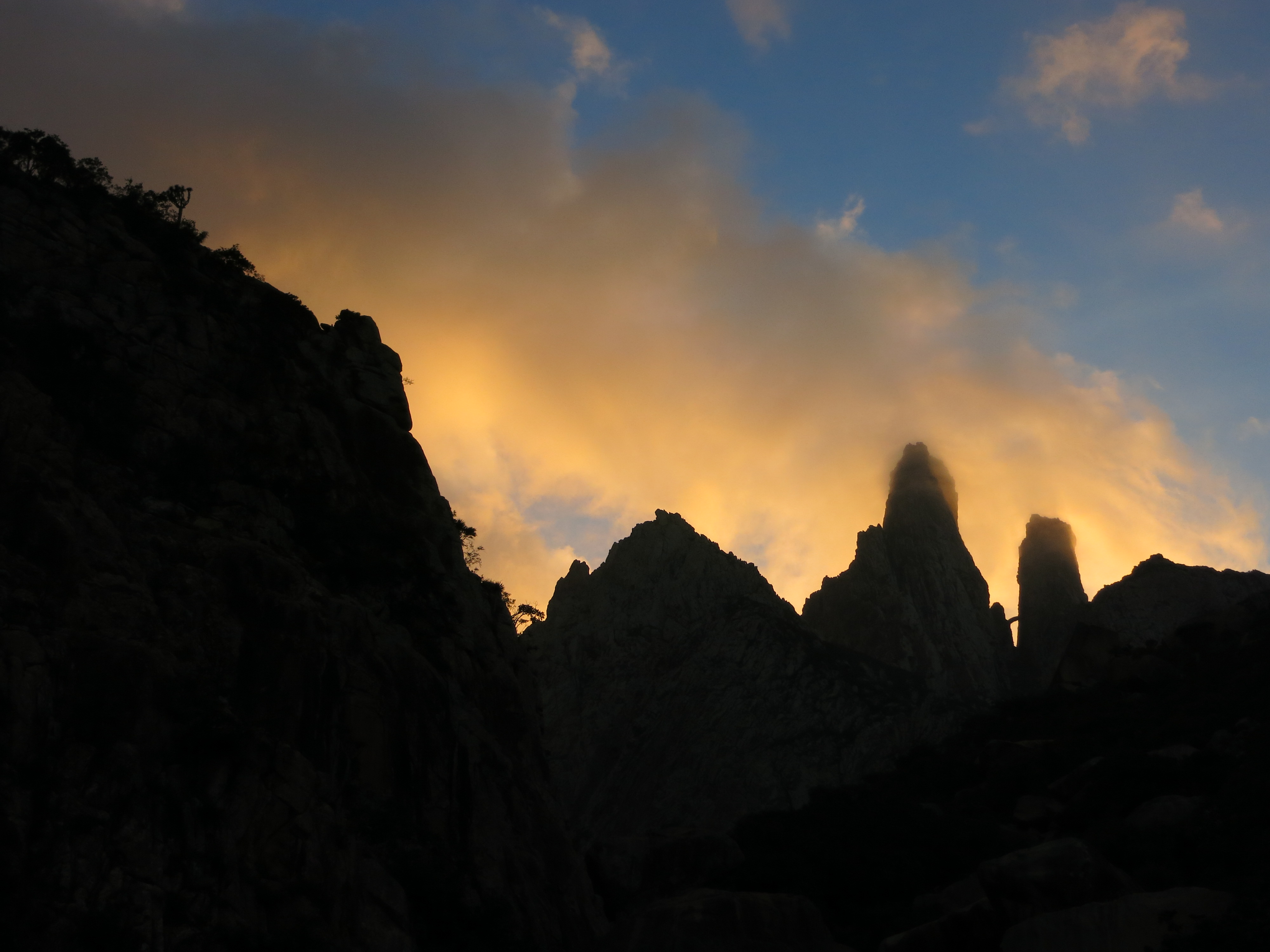
The twin peaks of Mashanig. The fallen pillar bridging the peaks is called "Mishifo". The left-hand tower is the highest point of the range.

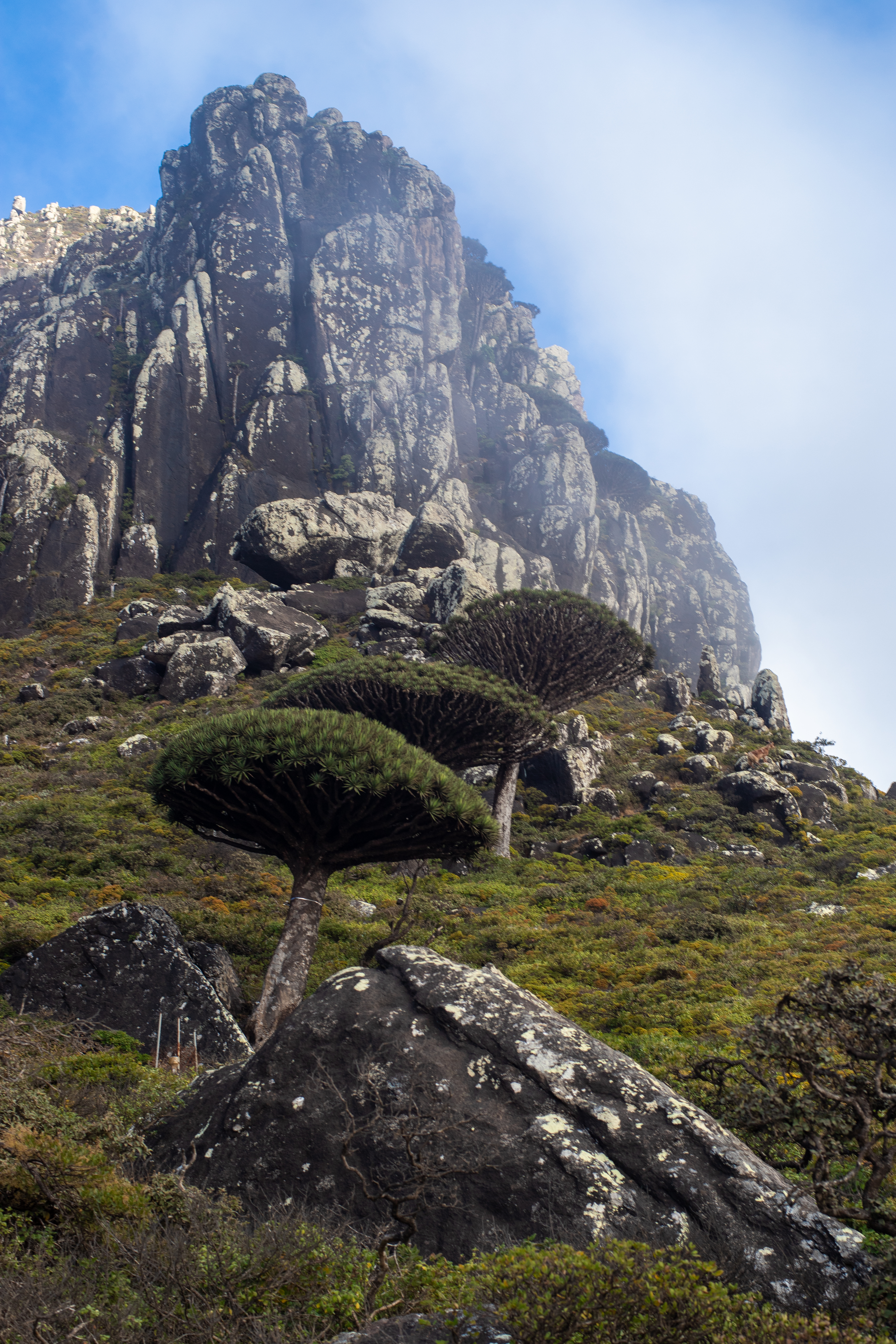
Mount Skand

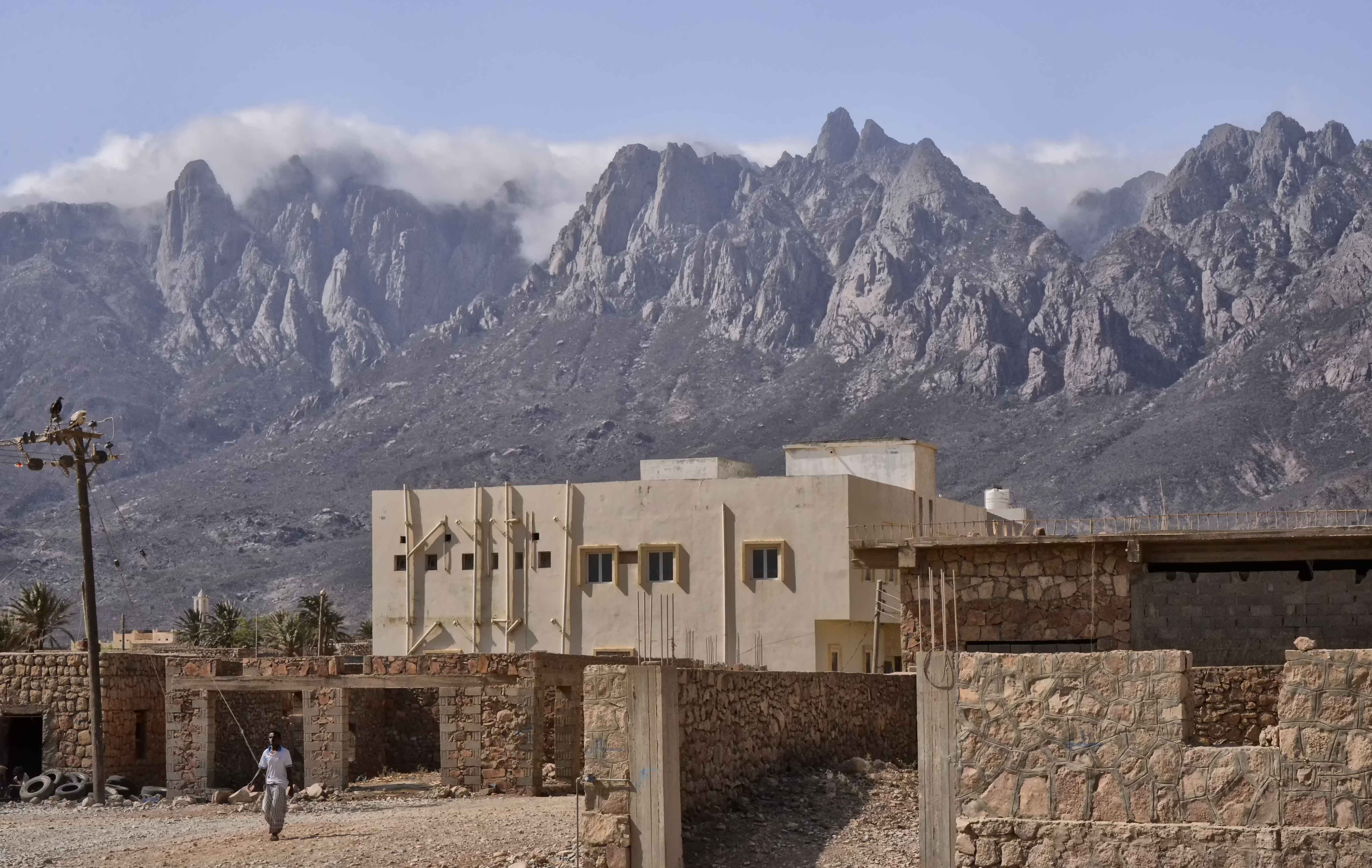
Hajhir Mountain peaks

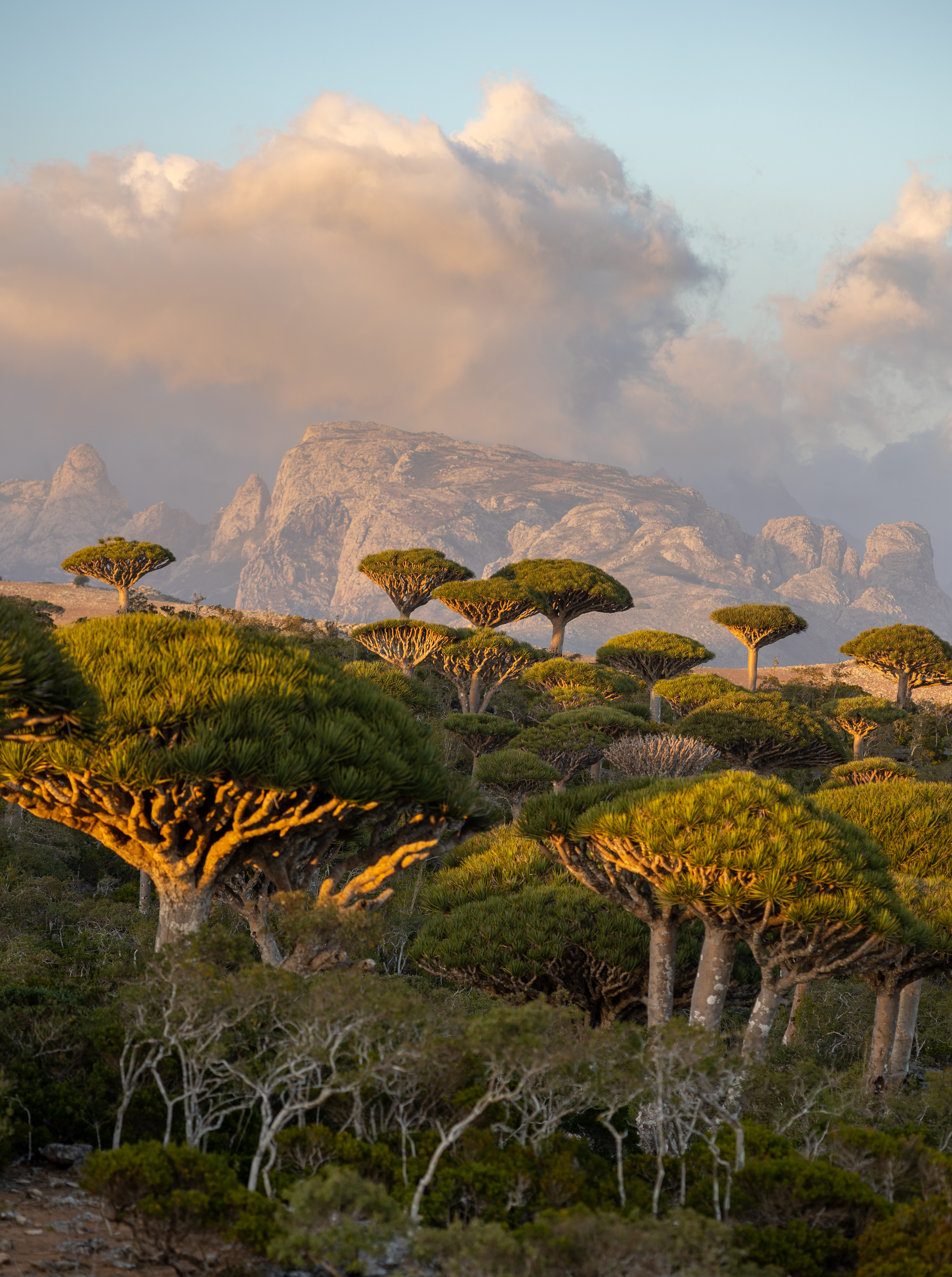
Golden hour in Socotra, Yemen

== See also ==
- Socotra Island xeric shrublands
- Hadhramaut Mountains
- Sarawat Mountains
  - Haraz Mountains

== Works cited ==
=== Books ===
- Morison, Samuel (1975). History of the United States Naval Operations in World War II: The Liberation of the Philippines Luzon, Mindanao, the Visaya 1944-1945. Vol. 13. Atlantic Monthly Press.

=== Journals ===
- Porter, R.; Stone, Francine (1996). "An introduction to Socotra and its birds". Sandgrouse. 17 (4). Ornithological Society of the Middle East: 73–80.
- Řepka, Radomir; Maděra, Petr; Čermák, Martin; Forrest, Alan (2017). "Carex socotrana, a New Endemic Species from Socotra Island". Novon. 25 (4). Missouri Botanical Garden Press: 467–472. doi:10.2307/26578228. JSTOR 26578228.
- Veettil, Bijeesh; Van, Dong; Quang, Ngo (2020). "Biodiversity and nature conservation in island ecosystems: spatiotemporal changes in Socotra archipelago (Yemen)". Journal of Coastal Conservation. 24 (5). Springer Nature: 1–9. doi:10.2307/48737152. JSTOR 48737152.

=== News ===
- White, Mel (2012). "Where the Weird Things Are". National Geographic. Archived from the original on 9 July 2025.

=== Web ===
- "Hajhir Mountains, Socotra Island, Yemen". NASA Earth Observatory. 29 January 2003. Archived from the original on 9 July 2025.
