= Living Bird =

Science journal

- Editor: Gustave Axelson
- Categories: Ornithology
- Frequency: Quarterly
- Publisher: Cornell Lab of Ornithology
- Founded: 1962
- Country: United States
- Language: English
- Website: www.allaboutbirds.org
- ISSN: 1059-521X

Living Bird is a quarterly magazine published by the Cornell Lab of Ornithology. Editorial director Gustave Axelson leads the team of writers, editors, and designers that produce the magazine.

Printed editions of Living Bird are distributed to members of the Cornell Lab of Ornithology. The photographs and artwork on the front and back covers as well as accompanying articles have been described as "stunning" and "beautiful". The magazine includes editorials and in-depth journalism on birds and bird conservation. From 2008 onward, issues of the magazine are also available online.

From 1962 through 1981, the magazine was published annually (with volume 19 being a multi-year edition covering 1980 and 1981). Since 1982, Living Bird has been published quarterly.

The magazine contains articles on birds, birding, science, conservation, people, art, photography, travel, and reviews of birding gear and books.

== See also ==
- List of ornithology journals
