= Carex socotrana =

Scientific classification
- Kingdom: Plantae
- Clade: Tracheophytes
- Clade: Angiosperms
- Clade: Monocots
- Clade: Commelinids
- Order: Poales
- Family: Cyperaceae
- Genus: Carex
- Species: C. socotrana

Binomial name
- Carex socotrana Repka & P.Madera

Species of grass-like plant

Carex socotrana is a species of sedge in the family Cyperaceae, native to the island of Socotra. It is known from only two populations in the Hajhir Mountains.
