= Bird Conservation International =

Peer-reviewed academic journal

- Discipline: Bird conservation
- Language: English
- Edited by: Phil Atkinson

Publication details
- History: 1991–present
- Publisher: Cambridge University Press
- Frequency: Quarterly
- Open access: Hybrid
- Impact factor: 1.5 (2022)

Standard abbreviations
- ISO 4: Bird Conserv. Int.

Indexing
- ISSN: 0959-2709 (print); 1474-0001 (web)
- LCCN: 2007233657
- OCLC no.: 23951080
- OCLC no.: 48801390

Links
- Journal homepage

Bird Conservation International is a quarterly peer-reviewed scientific journal published by Cambridge University Press on behalf of BirdLife International. The editor-in-chief is Phil Atkinson (British Trust for Ornithology). The journal transitioned to online-only publications from January 2023.

== Abstracting and indexing ==
The journal is abstracted and indexed in:

- Biological Abstracts
- BIOSIS Previews
- CAB Abstracts
- Current Contents/Agriculture, Biology & Environmental Sciences
- EBSCO databases
- GEOBASE
- ProQuest databases
- Science Citation Index Expanded
- Scopus
- The Zoological Record
- Essential Science Indicators

According to the Journal Citation Reports, the journal has a 2022 impact factor of 1.5.

== See also ==
- List of ornithology journals
