= Tichodroma (journal) =

- Language: Slovak, Czech and English

Publication details
- Publisher: BirdLife Slovakia/Institute of Forest Ecology

Standard abbreviations
- ISO 4: Tichodroma

Indexing
- ISSN: 1337-026X (print); 2644-4992 (web)

Links
- Journal homepage

Tichodroma is an ornithological journal published and distributed by the Slovak Ornithological Society/BirdLife Slovakia in cooperation with the Institute of Forest Ecology of the Slovak Academy of Sciences, Zvolen. The journal is issued once per year and publishes ornithological papers and short news in Slovak, Czech and English language with English or German abstracts. The papers are peer reviewed.

== See also ==
- List of ornithology journals
