= Tattler (newsletter) =

The Tattler, with the subtitle 'Newsletter for the East Asian - Australasian Flyway', is produced quarterly by the Australasian Wader Studies Group for distribution to its members and other interested people and organisations. It is available both as hard-copy and online. From 2006 it became available in Chinese and Indonesian language versions, as well as in English.

== See also ==
- List of ornithology journals
