= Atles dels Ocells Nidificants de Catalunya =

Catalan breeding bird atlas 2004

- Publisher: Lynx Edicions
- Publication date: 2004

The Atles dels Ocells Nidificants de Catalunya (Catalan Breeding Bird Atlas) is a critically acclaimed Catalan ornithological atlas, published in 2004 by the Catalan Ornithological Institute (ICO) and Lynx Edicions, and edited by Joan Estrada, Vittorio Pedrocchi, Lluis Brotons and Sergi Herrando. The book presents the results of three years of fieldwork surveying Catalonia's breeding birds between 1999 and 2002 and consists of 638 pages with maps, graphs, population estimates and trends, with illustrations by Toni Llobet. Each species has a full account in Catalan with a summary in English.
