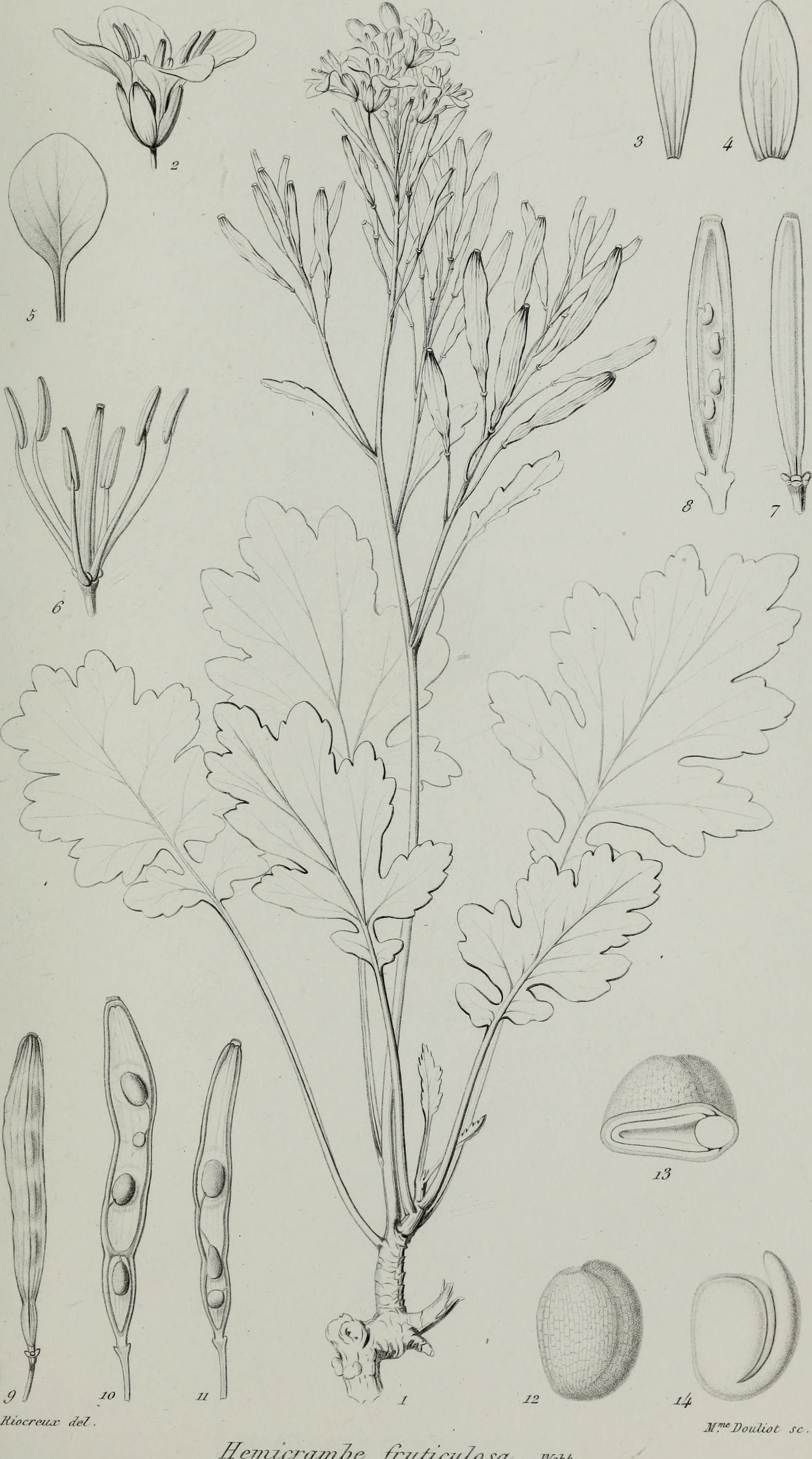
- Hemicrambe fruticulosa

Scientific classification
- Kingdom: Plantae
- Clade: Tracheophytes
- Clade: Angiosperms
- Clade: Eudicots
- Clade: Rosids
- Order: Brassicales
- Family: Brassicaceae
- Genus: Hemicrambe; Webb

Synonyms
- Fabrisinapis C.C.Towns.; Nesocrambe A.G.Mill.

= Hemicrambe =

Genus of flowering plants

Hemicrambe is a genus of flowering plants in the family Brassicaceae.

- Hemicrambe fruticosa (C.C.Towns.) Gómez-Campo – Socotra
- Hemicrambe fruticulosa Webb – Morocco
- Hemicrambe socotrana (A.G.Mill.) Al-Shehbaz – Socotra
