= Hemicrambe socotrana =

Conservation status
- Endangered (IUCN 3.1)

Scientific classification
- Kingdom: Plantae
- Clade: Tracheophytes
- Clade: Angiosperms
- Clade: Eudicots
- Clade: Rosids
- Order: Brassicales
- Family: Brassicaceae
- Genus: Hemicrambe
- Species: H. socotrana

Binomial name
- Hemicrambe socotrana (A.G.Mill.) Al-Shehbaz

Synonyms
- Nesocrambe socotrana A.G.Mill.

Species of flowering plant

Hemicrambe socotrana, synonym Nesocrambe socotrana, is a species of flowering plant in the family Brassicaceae. It is found only on "an inhospitable and windswept ridge at the western end of Soqotra", Yemen. It is listed as an endangered species on the IUCN Red List.
