= Lindsay Young =

Avian conservation biologist in Hawaii

Lindsay Young is an avian conservation biologist who has published over 110 journal articles and technical reports on Pacific Seabirds. She is currently Senior Scientist and Executive Director of the Pacific Rim Conservation. This nonprofit, research-based organization works to restore native seabird populations and ecosystems. She is also the current chair of the World Seabird Union. Young has also served as treasurer for the Pacific Seabird Group, as chair for the North Pacific Albatross Working Group, and as correspondent for the Agreement on the Conservation of Albatrosses and Petrels.

== Education ==
Young received a Bachelor of Science at the University of British Columbia and an M.S. and Ph.D. in Zoology at the University of Hawai`i at Mānoa.

Her graduate research focused on the population genetics, foraging ecology, and conservation needs of the Laysan Albatross.

== Career and research ==
Young has described the demography and evolution of the Laysan Albatross. In 2009, she and a team of researchers discovered that Laysan Albatross on Kure Atoll ingested more than ten times the amount of plastic than those on the island of O`ahu. The team also put miniature tracking devices on the birds and found that their hunting territory overlaps with the Great Pacific Garbage Patch, a floating garbage patch in the Western Pacific Ocean.

In 2010, Young helped initiate the first “predator proof” fence in Hawai`i, constructed at Ka`ena Point Coastal Reserve, O`ahu, to prevent invasive species from damaging coastal ecosystems. This fence helped to quadruple native seabird populations. Hawai’i Department of Land and Natural Resources, the U.S. Fish & Wildlife Service, the Hawai’i Chapter of the Wildlife Society, and local communities collaborated to make this project happen.

In 2014, Young oversaw the construction of a second predator-proof fence at Kilauea Point National Wildlife Refuge. This project also included intensive habitat restoration to make the area suitable for translocation of Newell’s Shearwaters and Hawaiian Petrels.

For over a decade, Young studied the benefits of female-female nesting pairs in a Laysan Albatross colony on northwest O`ahu. Laysan Albatross typically mate for life and the male and female of the species look identical. Young used DNA from the feathers from albatross pairs and found that over a third of the pairs were female-female. The female-female pairings had half the reproductive success of heterosexual pairs.

In 2017, Young helped translocate baby Black-footed Albatross from Midway Atoll to O`ahu in a "head start program" that avoided rising sea level threats to their original habitat.

In 2019, she led a team that discovered Newell’s shearwaters in the Waianae mountains, particularly on Mount Ka`ala, O`ahu. These once-abundant species had not been seen on O`ahu since the 1700s, so the findings were important to establishing future restoration efforts.

Young co-edited the book Conservation of Marine Birds, synthesizing the global threats seabirds face and providing conservation strategies to protect them. She also co-published Prioritization of Restoration Needs for Seabirds in the U.S. Tropical Pacific Vulnerable to Climate Change, to assess which seabird species would benefit most from restoration efforts.

== Awards and recognition ==
- 2011, named a Recovery Champion by the U.S. Fish & Wildlife Service for saving native seabird species from extinction in Hawai`i.
- 2016, special achievement award from the Pacific Seabird Group in recognition of her commitment to protecting Hawaiian seabirds.
- 2019, Koa Award for Conservation Leadership from the Conservation Council of Hawai`i.
- 2022, Ralph W. Schreiber Award from the American Ornithological Society for her conservation work on Laysan Albatross and Hawaiian 'elepaio.
