= William Robert Ogilvie-Grant =

Scottish ornithologist

- Born: 25 March 1863
- Died: 26 July 1924 (aged 61)
- Education: Fettes College, Edinburgh
- Known for: Initiating the first of the British Museum Ruwenzori expeditions
- Spouse: Maud Louisa Pechell
- Children: Mark Ogilvie-Grant
- Father: George Henry Essex Ogilvy-Grant
- Relatives: Mark Robert Pechell (father-in-law)
- Scientific career
- Fields: Ornithology
- Workplaces: Natural History Museum, London
- Author abbrev. (zoology): Ogilvie-Grant

William Robert Ogilvie-Grant (25 March 1863 – 26 July 1924) was a Scottish ornithologist.

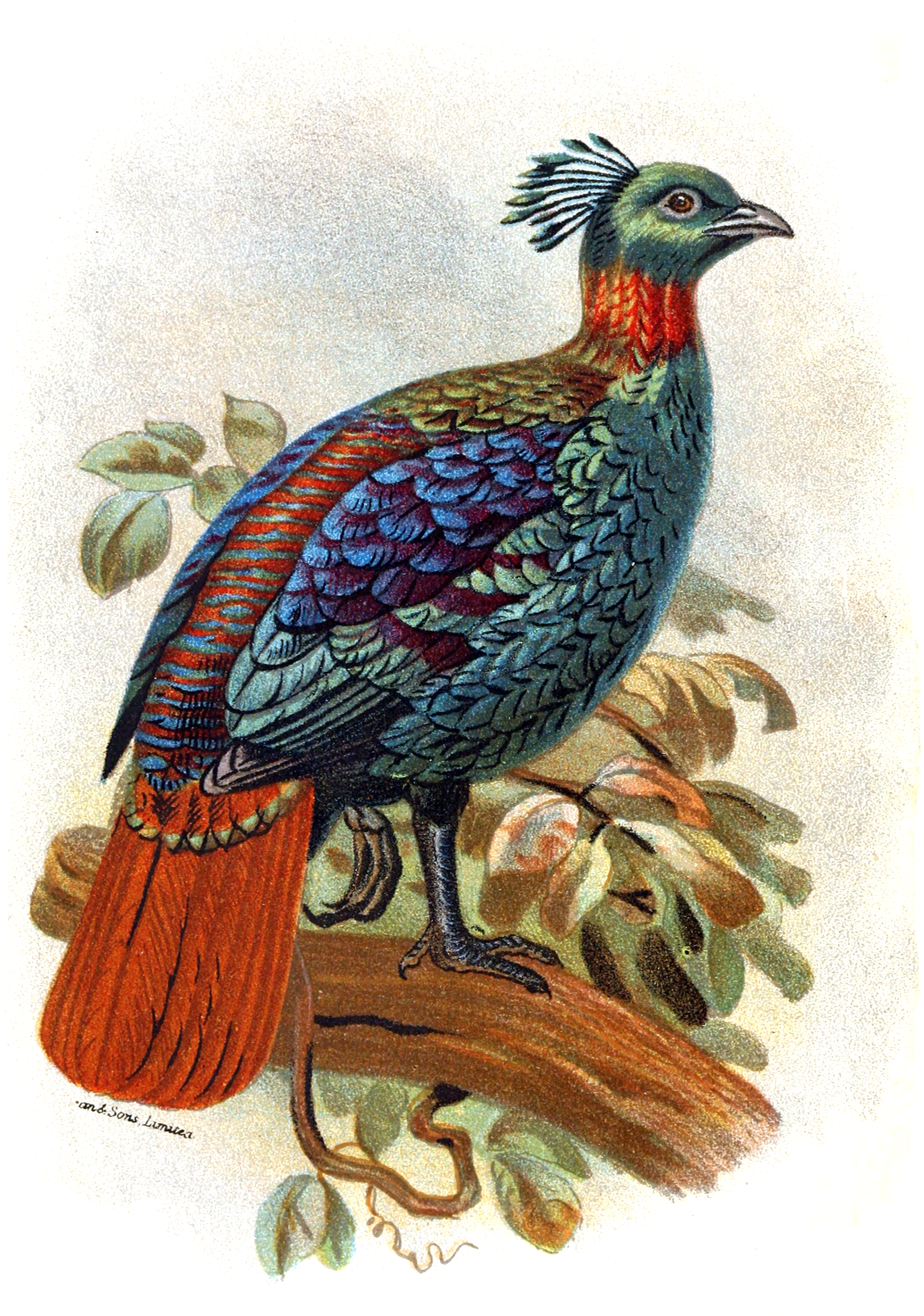
Illustrated of Himalayan monal by William Robert Ogilvie-Grant

== Early life and education ==
Grant was born on 25 March 1863 as the second son of Capt. the Hon. George Henry Essex Ogilvy-Grant, of Easter Elchies, Craigellachie, Scotland, of the 42nd Highlanders, sixth son of Francis Ogilvy-Grant, 6th Earl of Seafield, and daughter of Sir William Gordon-Cumming, 2nd Baronet. Ogilvie-Grant was educated at Fettes College, Edinburgh, where he studied zoology and anatomy. He also studied at Cargilfield Preparatory School.

== Career ==
In 1882 he became an Assistant at the Natural History Museum. He studied ichthyology under Albert C. L. G. Günther, and in 1885 he was put in temporary charge of the Ornithological Section under Richard Bowdler Sharpe's visit to India. He remained in that department, eventually becoming Curator of Birds from 1909 to 1918.

He also succeeded Bowdler Sharpe as editor of the Bulletin of the British Ornithologists' Club, a post he held from 1904 to 1914.

Ogilvie-Grant initiated the first of the British Museum Ruwenzori expeditions which took place in 1905-1906. He also made many collecting trips himself, especially to Socotra, Madeira, and the Canary Islands.

== Taxa described by him ==
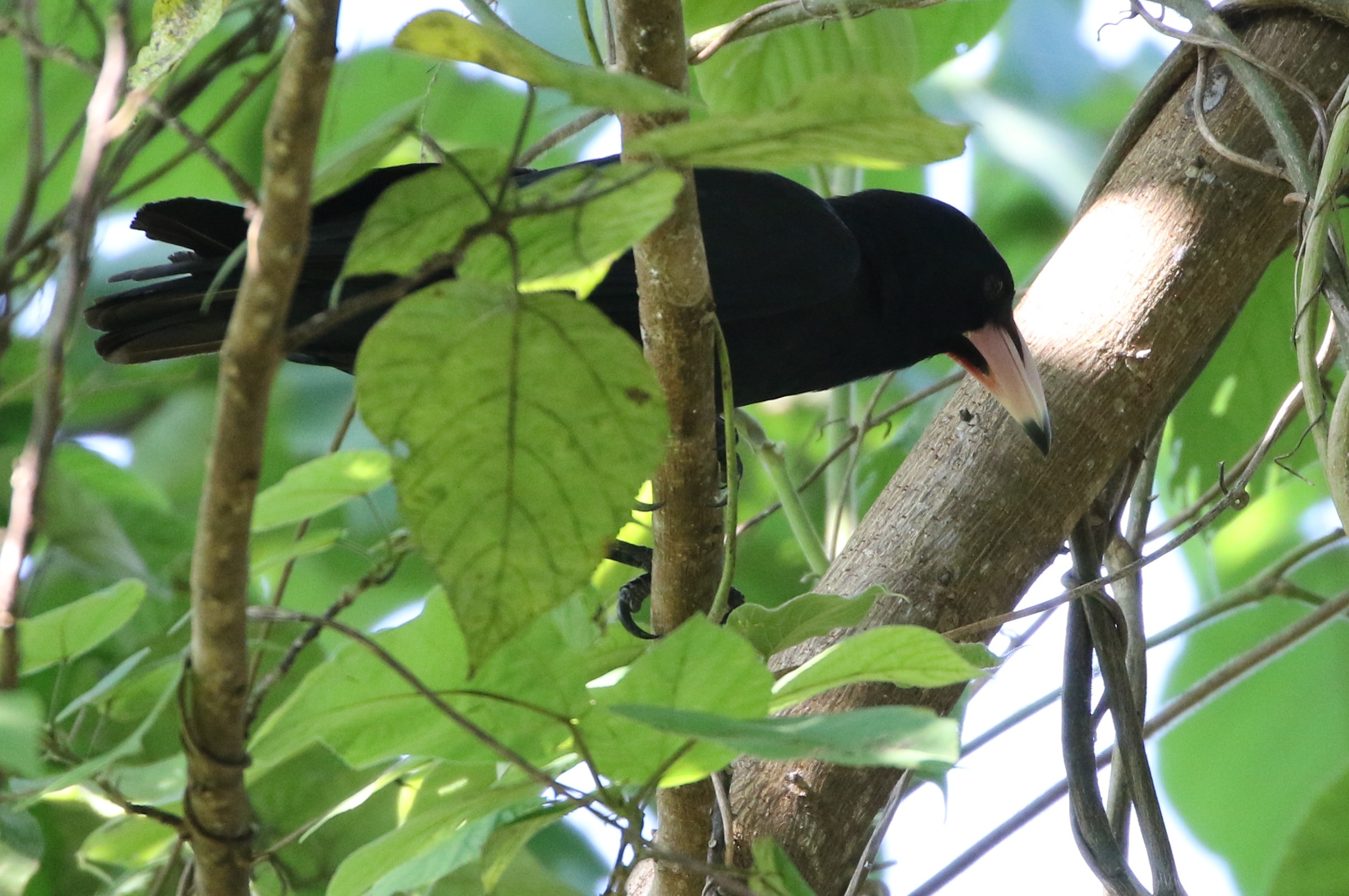
- White-billed crow (Corvus woodfordi), described by Ogilvie-Grant
  See Category:Taxa named by William Robert Ogilvie-Grant

== Taxa named in his honour ==
- Ogilvie-Grant is commemorated in the scientific name of a species of gecko, Hemidactylus granti, which is endemic to Socotra.
- Kloss's leaf warbler Phylloscopus ogilviegranti is named after him.

== Personal life ==
Ogilvie-Grant married Maud Louisa, daughter of Admiral Mark Robert Pechell; they had a son and three daughters. His son Mark Ogilvie-Grant was a diplomat and botanist.

== Source ==
- Mullens and Swann - A Bibliography of British Ornithology.
