= Bird Study =

Peer-reviewed academic journal

- Discipline: Field ornithology
- Language: English
- Edited by: Richard Broughton

Publication details
- History: 1954–present
- Publisher: Taylor & Francis
- Frequency: Quarterly
- Open access: Hybrid
- Impact factor: 0.7 (2022)

Standard abbreviations
- ISO 4: Bird Study

Indexing
- ISSN: 0006-3657 (print); 1944-6705 (web)
- LCCN: 58026495
- OCLC no.: 476152481

Links
- Journal homepage; Online access; Online archive

Bird Study is a quarterly peer-reviewed scientific journal published by Taylor & Francis on behalf of the British Trust for Ornithology. The editor-in-chief is Richard Broughton (UK Centre for Ecology & Hydrology). The journal was established in 1954 during the early years of ornithological quantitative research, at a time when the basic methods of bird research were still being developed. Early issues of the journal included papers on population dynamics, bird migration, ethology, ecology and field methods for conducting research.

== Abstracting and indexing ==
The journal is abstracted and indexed in:

- Biological Abstracts
- BIOSIS Previews
- CAB Abstracts
- Current Contents/Agriculture, Biology & Environmental Sciences
- EBSCO databases
- GEOBASE
- ProQuest databases
- Science Citation Index Expanded
- Scopus
- The Zoological Record

According to the Journal Citation Reports, the journal has a 2022 impact factor of 0.7.

== See also ==
- List of ornithology journals
