= Bulletin of the British Ornithologists' Club =

- Volume 137, issue 1, March 2017
- Discipline: Ornithology
- Language: English
- Edited by: Guy Kirwan

Publication details
- History: 1892–present
- Publisher: British Ornithologists' Club (United Kingdom)
- Frequency: quarterly

Standard abbreviations
- ISO 4: Bull. Br. Ornithol. Club

Indexing
- ISSN: 0007-1595 (print); 2513-9894 (web)

Links
- Journal homepage; Journal at the Biodiversity Heritage Library

The Bulletin of the British Ornithologists' Club is an ornithological journal published by the British Ornithologists' Club (BOC). It is cited as Bull. B. O. C.

Many descriptions of birds new to science have been published in the bulletin.

The journal was first published in 1892. It is published in four quarterly issues. from March 2017 (Vol. 137 No. 1), it became an online-only, open access, journal, giving as the reasons for the change:

the realities of current trends in academic journal publication, the slow decline in the readership of the hard copy Bull. Brit. Orn. Cl. and our public benefit charitable responsibilities.

Since 2004, the journal's honorary editor has been Guy Kirwan.

== List of editors ==
List of Bulletin Editors with dates of tenure

- Richard Bowdler Sharpe 1892–1904
- W. R. Ogilvie-Grant 1904–1914
- David Armitage Bannerman 1914–1915
- D. Seth-Smith 1915–1920
- Percy R. Lowe 1920–1925
- Norman B. Kinnear 1925–1930
- G. Carmichael Low 1930–1935 and 1940–1945
- C. H. B. Grant 1935–1940 and 1947–1952
- W. P. C. Tenison 1945–1947
- J. G. Harrison 1952–1961
- J.J. Yealland 1962–1969
- C.W. Benson 1969–1974
- Hugh Elliott 1974–1975
- J.F. Monk 1976–1990
- D.W. Snow 1991–1997
- C.J. Feare 1997–2003
- G.M. Kirwan 2004–

== See also ==
- List of ornithology journals
