= Aves Argentinas-Asociación Ornitológica del Plata =

Argentine conservation charity

Aves Argentinas-Asociación Ornitológica del Plata (AA-AOP)
- Company type: Conservation charity
- Founded: 28 July 1916
- Headquarters: Buenos Aires, Argentina
- Website: www.avesargentinas.org.ar

Aves Argentinas-Asociación Ornitológica del Plata (Argentine Birds-Ornithological Society of Argentina) is Argentina's main bird conservation charity. It was founded in 1916.

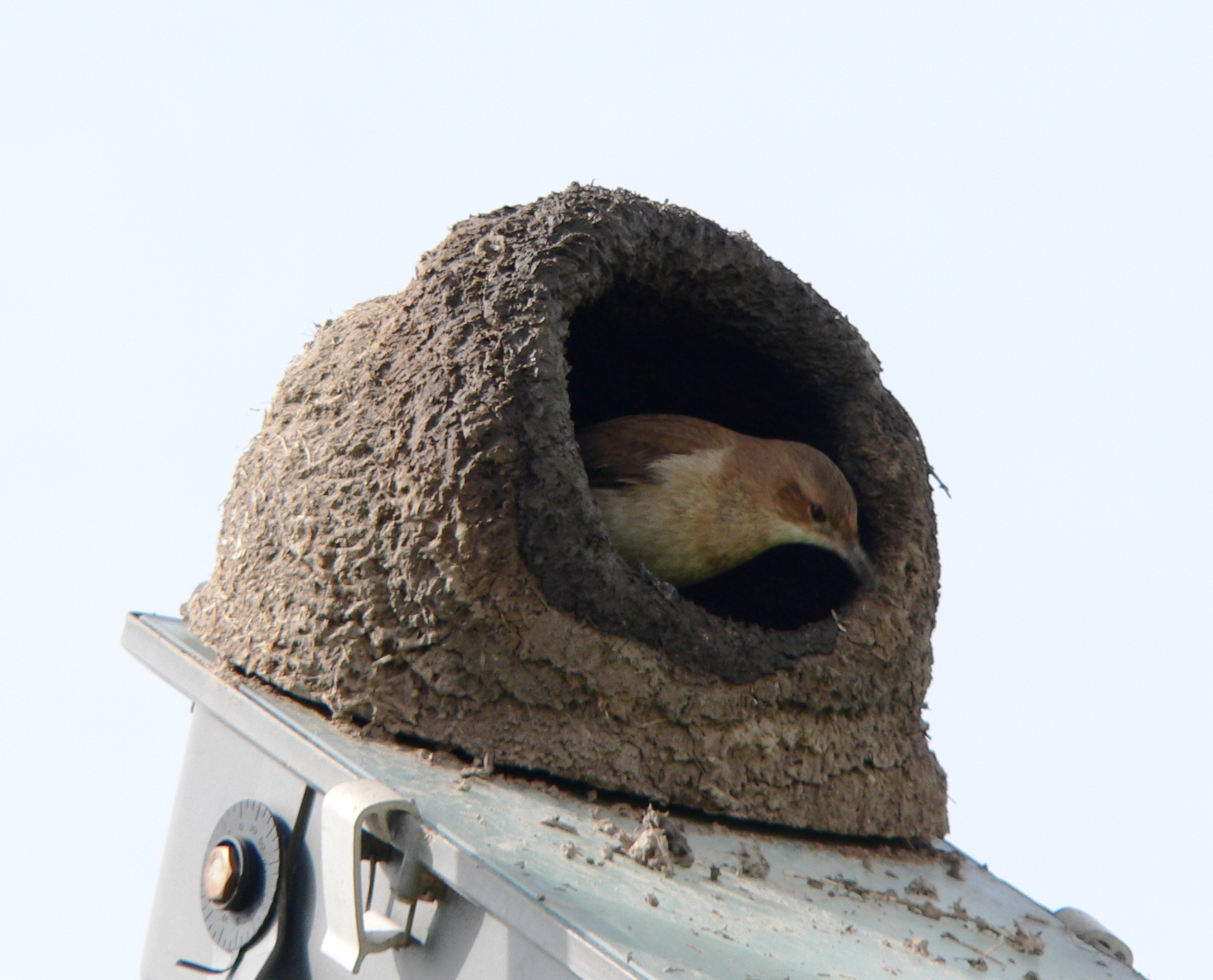
Hornero (Furnarius rufus), the symbol of AA-AOP

== Aims ==
- To identify habitats prioritary for the conservation of globally threatened birds.
- To increase public awareness of the importance of birds, their natural habitats, and the biodiversity the latter.
- To gradually increase the membership of the charity as a result of the registration of new members and, at the same time, keeping old members
- To stimulate scientific research in the field of ornithology as well as the publication of ornithological research results.
- To enhance the management of the charity for increasing its efficacy in fulfilling its aims.

== History ==
Aves Argentinas was first created as Sociedad Ornitológica del Plata, in Buenos Aires, Argentina, 28 July 1916. The foundation document was signed by Eduardo L. Holmberg, Ángel Gallardo, Roberto Dabbene, Martín Doello Jurado, Juan Bautista Ambrosetti, Carlos Luis Spegazzini, Pedro Serié, Pedro Segundo Casal, Fernando Lahille, Santiago Pozzi, Antonio Pozzi, Juan Brèthes, Julio Koslovsky, Demetrio Rodríguez, F. Manuel Rodríguez, Luis F. Delétang, Carlos A. Marelli, Juan José Nágera, Carlos A. Gutiérrez, Héctor Ambrosetti, and Arturo Germán Frers. Later, Sociedad Ornitológica del Plata change its name to Asociación Ornitológica del Plata (AOP) and became the most important Argentinean NGO devoted to the study and conservation of birds. The change of its name to Aves Argentinas-Asociación Ornitológica del Plata (AA-AOP), which took place during the first decade of the 21st century, was intended to convey in a quicker fashion the interests of the organization. Aves Argentinas-AOP's headquarters are currently located at 1248 Matheu street in Ciudad Autónoma de Buenos Aires, Argentina.

== Publications ==
Aves Argentinas-AOP has three periodical publications. The half-yearly El Hornero is a peer-reviewed scientific journal that concentrates in results from research in Neotropical ornithology. The quarterly Nuestras Aves (Our Birds), publishes communications on the interface between scientific reports, bird conservation, and bird watching. Finally, the also quarterly Aves Argentinas is a popularization magazine devoted to conservation in general.
