= Birding Business =

Birding Business was a free business publication that served as a trade news source for the wild bird and nature products industry. It was based in O’Lakes in the U.S. state of Florida. The magazine was published five times each year by Longdown Management, Inc. It started in 1995. The last issue of the magazine was published in September 2015.

== See also ==
- List of journals and magazines relating to birding and ornithology
