= Sandgrouse (journal) =

- Discipline: Ornithology
- Language: English

Publication details
- History: 1980–present
- Publisher: Ornithological Society of the Middle East (United Kingdom)

Standard abbreviations
- ISO 4: Sandgrouse

Indexing
- ISSN: 0260-4736

Links
- Journal homepage

Sandgrouse is the journal of the Ornithological Society of the Middle East. The journal covers ornithology in the region of the Middle East, the Caucasus, and Central Asia. It is named after a family of birds which are particularly characteristic of desert regions such as those found in the Middle East.

The first ten issues were edited by Donald Parr. Numbers 11 to 12 and volumes 13 and 14 were edited by Duncan J. Brooks. Volumes 18-25 were edited by Guy Kirwan, and volume 26 jointly by Kirwan and Michael Blair. Mike Blair was then the editor until spring 2008. The current editor since volume 30(2) is Dr P. J. Cowan of the University of Nizwa in Oman.

== See also ==
- List of ornithology journals
