= Neotropical Bird Club =

British-based ornithological and birdwatching club

- Formation: 1994
- Fields: Ornithology

The Neotropical Bird Club (NBC) is a British-based ornithological and birdwatching club established in 1994 for people interested in the birds of the Neotropics, namely South America, Central America from Mexico to Panama, and the islands of the Caribbean.

Its aims are to foster interest in Neotropical birds among birdwatchers, support conservation in the region, encourage birdwatchers there to contribute to bird conservation, publish articles and notes about the birds, their identification and conservation, focus on priority species and sites, drawing attention to conservation needs, publicise the activities of local individuals and groups, and improve their liaison and collaboration with other birdwatchers.

== Publications ==
The NBC publishes the biannual scientific journal, Cotinga (1994–2009) as well as the biannual magazine Neotropical Birding.
