= Florida Ornithological Society =

Ornithological organization

- Florida Ornithological Society Inc.
- Abbreviation: FOS
- Formation: October 14, 1972; 53 years ago
- Type: Nonprofit
- Tax ID no.: 59-1869360
- Legal status: 501(c)(3)
- Headquarters: Port Saint Lucie, Florida
- Region served: Florida
- President: Ann Paul
- Website: www.fosbirds.org

The Florida Ornithological Society (FOS) is a Florida organization formed to promote field ornithology and facilitate contact between persons interested in birds.

It was founded October 14, 1972, under the sponsorship of the Florida Audubon Society, at a Lakeland, Florida, meeting attended by more than 100 ornithologists and serious birders.

== Florida Field Naturalist ==
Florida Field Naturalist
- Language: English

Publication details
- Publisher: Florida Ornithological Society
- Frequency: Quarterly

Standard abbreviations
- ISO 4: Fla. Field Nat.

Indexing
- ISSN: 0738-999X
- LCCN: 90656246
- OCLC no.: 3018654

Links
- Journal homepage

The society's publications include the quarterly journal Florida Field Naturalist, a special publication series, and a quarterly newsletter. Annual activities of the FOS include participation in the North American Migration Count and Christmas bird count. The society also provides grants in aid for bird research and bird-related environmental education.

== See also ==
- List of Florida birds
- List of state ornithological organizations in the United States
