= Toni Llobet =

Spanish artist

Toni Llobet (born 1975) is a Catalan artist and illustrator from Barcelona. He has illustrated several bird and wildlife books, including the New Catalan Breeding Bird Atlas, Handbook of the Birds of the World and the Handbook of the Mammals of the World.
