= Journal of Raptor Research =

- Discipline: Ornithology
- Language: English
- Edited by: Cheryl Dykstra

Publication details
- History: 1967–present
- Publisher: Raptor Research Foundation
- Frequency: Quarterly
- Impact factor: 0.849 (2020)

Standard abbreviations
- ISO 4: J. Raptor Res.

Indexing
- ISSN: 0892-1016 (print); 2162-4569 (web)
- OCLC no.: 15078979

Links
- Journal homepage; Online access

The Journal of Raptor Research is a peer-reviewed scientific journal established in 1967 covering birds of prey and research on raptor ecology, behavior, life history, conservation, and techniques. It is published quarterly by the Raptor Research Foundation.

According to the Journal Citation Reports, the journal had an impact factor of 0.631 in 2014, ranking it 14th out of 22 journals in the category "Ornithology".

== See also ==
- List of ornithology journals
