= USS Kingbird =

USS Kingbird may refer to the following ships of the United States Navy:

- USS Kingbird (AMc-56), was acquired by the US Navy 26 December 1940 and placed out of service 7 June 1946
- USS Kingbird (MSC-194), was launched 21 May 1954 and scrapped in 1973
