= Irish Birding News =

- Language: English

Publication details
- Publisher: Birds of Ireland News Service

Standard abbreviations
- ISO 4: Ir. Bird. News

Irish Birding News was a quarterly journal published by the team behind the Birds of Ireland News Service (B.I.N.S.), and was somewhat along the lines of an Irish form of Birding World. It included a summary of rarities reported to the birdline, articles relating to identification, usually of birds spotted in Ireland, and site guides for birding spots in Ireland and abroad.
