= Tennessee Ornithological Society =

Ornithological organization

The Tennessee Ornithological Society (TOS) is an independent non-profit educational, scientific, and conservation organization in Tennessee, United States, dedicated to the study and conservation of birds. It was formed in 1915 and has published a quarterly journal, The Migrant, since 1930. The organization conducts statewide meetings and its local chapters have regular meetings and field trips.

The TOS was started by a group of six amateur ornithologists who met at Faucon's French Restaurant in Nashville on October 7, 1915. A historical marker at the site commemorates the organization's founding.

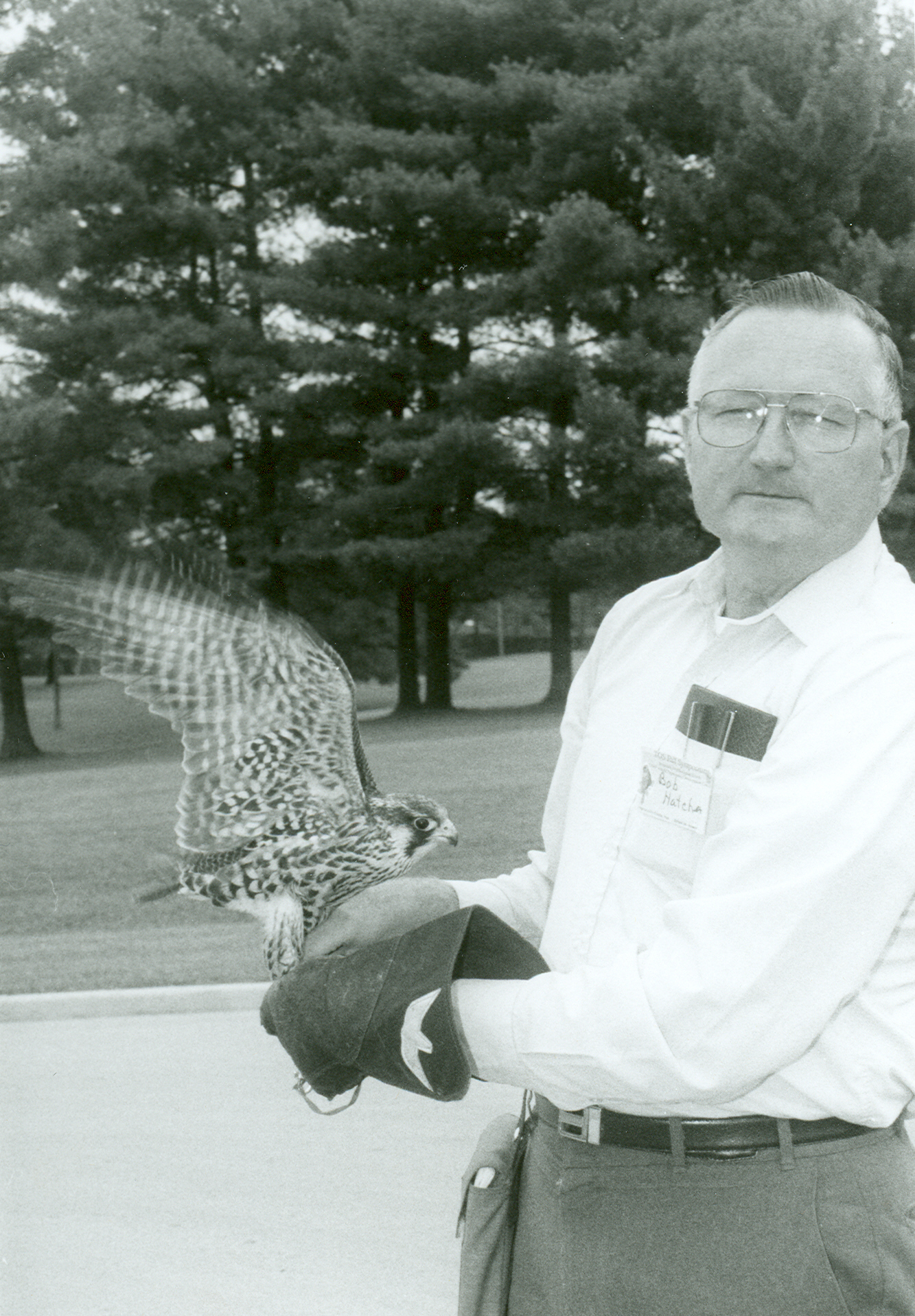
Bob Hatcher of the Tennessee Ornithological Society, releasing a peregrine falcon back into the wild

Annual activities of the organization include annual autumn hawk counts, spring and fall bird counts, winter raptor surveys, and annual Christmas bird counts.

The quarterly journal of the Tennessee Ornithological Society, The Migrant, is a repository for sighting reports and articles related to monitoring the status of Tennessee's bird populations. The organization also published the Atlas of the Breeding Birds of Tennessee by Charles P. Nicholson (ISBN 0870499874), a compendium on the birds of the state, based on research conducted by TOS members from 1986 through 1991. The atlas includes the first fully documented account of distribution patterns for 170 bird species confirmed as breeding in Tennessee, as well as for several unconfirmed or extirpated bird species.

== See also ==
- List of state ornithological organizations in the United States
