= Catalan Ornithological Institute =

Catalan non-profit organization

- Founded: 1975
- Type: Nonprofit organization
- Website: ornitologia.org

The Catalan Ornithological Institute (abbreviated to ICO; in Catalan: Institut Català d'Ornitologia) is a nonprofit organization, established in 1975 to aid the study of birds in Catalonia, with the name of Grup Català d'Anellament. The association specialises in the development and coordination of large-scale monitoring schemes requiring the contribution of many ornithologists. The association runs courses for a wide range of practical ornithological activities, including ringing.

== Catalan Ringing Office ==
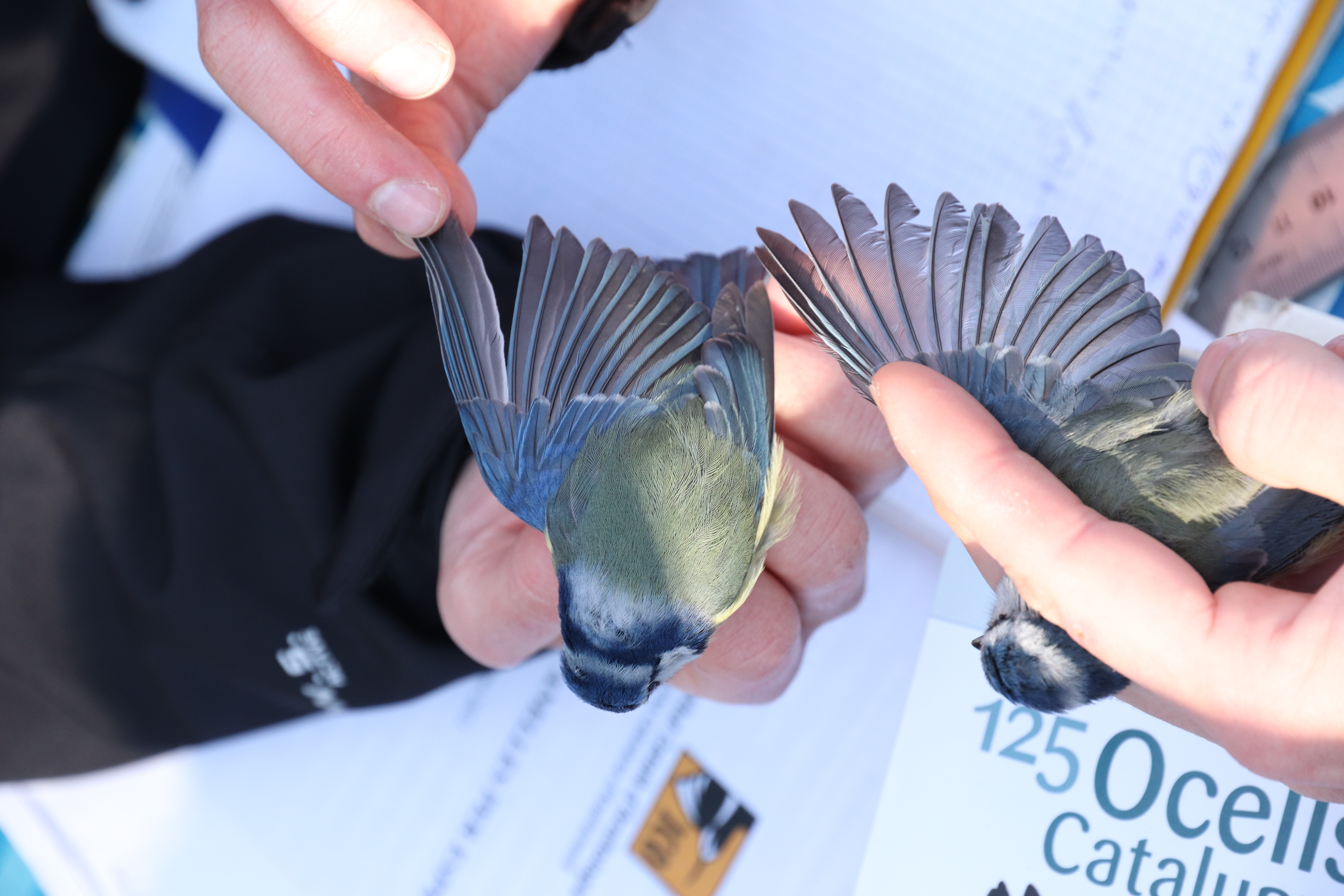
Bird ringing session organized by the Catalan Ornithological Institute

In Catalonia, scientific bird ringing is regulated by the Minister of the Environment and Housing, which delegates the management and coordination to the ICO. Within the ICO, the Office of Catalan Ringing integrates these functions and centralizes the information collected during more than 25 years of history of ringing in Catalonia. The scientific ringing of birds is one of the main activities of the ICO. Every year, about 60,000 new registrations are added in the databases. ICO is a member of the European Union for Bird Ringing (EURING).

== Publications ==
The ICO has published several books concerning the birdlife of Catalonia, including the critically acclaimed New Catalan Breeding Bird Atlas (Catalan: Atles dels Ocells Nidificants de Catalunya). Published in 2004 by Lynx Edicions and edited by Joan Estrada, Vittorio Pedrocchi, Lluis Brotons and Sergi Herrando, the book presents the results of three years' worth of fieldwork surveying Catalonia's breeding birds between 1999 and 2002. The result is 638 pages of maps, graphs, population estimates and trends in the population. Each species has a full account in Catalan with a summary in English. Illustrations are by Toni Llobet.

The ICO is currently compiling a Catalan Winter Bird Atlas with survey work taking place between 2006 and 2009.
