= Alula (magazine) =

Finnish ornithological magazine

- Categories: Ornithology
- Frequency: Quarterly
- Publisher: Alula
- First issue: 1995
- Final issue: 2008
- Country: Finland
- Based in: Turku
- Website: http://www.alula.fi/
- ISSN: 1455-9439

Alula was an ornithological magazine published in Turku, Finland. The magazine was published on a quarterly basis. Initially it was published in both Finnish, and English; the final volumes were published in English only. It was aimed primarily at birders with an interest in the birds of the Western Palearctic. The final issue of Alula was issued in 2008 (volume 14, issue 3) after which printing ceased in 2009.

== See also ==
- List of ornithology journals
