= Rocky Mountain Raptor Program =

US nonprofit organization

- Abbreviation: RMRP
- Formation: 1987; 39 years ago
- Type: Nonprofit
- Tax ID no.: 90-0131614
- Legal status: 501(c)(3)
- Headquarters: Fort Collins, Colorado
- Services: Wildlife/Raptor rescue, rehabilitation, and release. Community conservation education, and knowledge contribution to research
- Executive Director & Board Member: Carin Avila
- Website: www.rmrp.org

The Rocky Mountain Raptor Program (RMRP) is a 501(c)(3) non-profit wildlife conservation organization based in Fort Collins, Colorado, that rescues, rehabilitates, and releases injured birds of prey—including eagles, hawks, falcons, and owls—and, through its comprehensive Environmental Education program, teaches the importance of preserving wildlife and wild places for future generations. RMRP has developed a national reputation for the treatment of raptor illness and injuries, cage design, volunteer management, community involvement, and youth development. Raptor patients receive fracture repair, wound care, fluids to combat dehydration, nutritious food, and regular medical attention to promote healing. Raptors that are permanently injured and therefore non-releasable may become an Educational Ambassador. These raptors are the cornerstone of our Environmental Education program, which makes more than 200 presentations each year throughout the region, teaching children and adults about the importance of protecting wildlife and wild places. The program's environmental education program, particularly in the K–12 sector, has developed an excellent reputation throughout Colorado. RMRP reaches more than 15,000 schoolchildren annually. Numerous outreach exhibits throughout the state reach hundreds of thousands of people annually. Rocky Mountain Raptor Program currently averages about one admission and several injured raptor calls each day, and 77% of treatable raptors are released.

== History ==
The Rocky Mountain Raptor Program started in 1979 as a student club at Colorado State University, rehabilitating a few injured raptors each year. From the first hawk cared for that year, thousands of raptors have followed. In 2007, to make room for CSU's Veterinary Hospital expansion of a new diagnostic laboratory building, RMRP moved into a facility at 720B East Vine Drive in Fort Collins. The program plans to create a wildlife and rehabilitation facility that is open to the public and will provide conservation education, raptor rehabilitation, and research. RMRP owns a 26-acre (110,000 m^{2}) piece of land that may serve as this future home.

== Facilities ==
Rocky Mountain Raptor Program currently operates at one facility in North Fort Collins. The raptor rehabilitation center and hospital is located at 720B East Vine Drive in Fort Collins Colorado. Although this facility is not open to the public, tours are available for a fee.
