= Waterbird Society =

American ornithological organization

Waterbirds
- Discipline: Ornithology
- Language: English

Publication details
- Former name(s): Colonial Waterbirds, Proceedings of the Colonial Waterbird Group
- History: 1978–
- Publisher: Waterbird Society

Standard abbreviations
- ISO 4: Waterbirds

Indexing
- Waterbirds: The International Journal of Waterbird Biology
- ISSN: 1524-4695 (print); 1938-5390 (web)
- Colonial Waterbirds
- ISSN: 0738-6028
- Proceedings of the Colonial Waterbird Group
- ISSN: 1556-5785

The Waterbird Society, formerly known as the Colonial Waterbirds Society, is a United States based ornithological society, focusing on the behavior, ecology, and conservation of waterbirds. It was founded in 1976 as the Colonial Waterbird Group, becoming the Colonial Waterbird Society in 1986 and acquiring its current name in 1999 to reflect an expanding interest in all waterbirds. The Society operates mostly on annual membership dues.

The society is led by a council headed by a President, a Vice-president, a Secretary, and a Treasurer.

Presidents of the Waterbird Society:

- 2024–2025: Ricardo Zambrano, US
- 2022–2023: Dr. Patty Szczys, US
- 2020–2021: Dr. David J. Moore, Canada
- 2018–2019: Dr. Clay Green, US
- 2016–2017: Dr. Erica Nol, Canada
- 2014–2015: Dr. Susan Elbin, US

The Waterbird Society presents awards periodically to individuals for outstanding contribution to waterbird science, exemplary service to the Society, and to students for excellence in scientific presentations and posters at Annual Meetings.

To recognize individuals who have made outstanding contributions to waterbird science, two international awards have been instituted. The Robert Cushman Murphy Prize is given for excellence in avian sciences, and the Kai Curry-Lindahl Prize for excellence in conservation biology.

The Distinguished Service Award recognizes members of the Waterbird Society who have provided exemplary service to the Society and its members.

The Waterbird Society awards annual grants for research projects from funds that were provided by two former presidents of the Society. Proposals for these awards can be submitted from anywhere globally. The Nisbet Research Award was set up by Dr. Ian Newton for work focusing on gulls and terns. The Kushlan Research Award was instituted by Dr. James Kushlan with the goal to encourage scientific research on Ciconiiformes (herons, storks, ibis, spoonbills, and their taxonomic allies).

The Waterbird Society is a member of the Ornithological Council.

The Society organizes an Annual Meeting each year that includes a formal meeting of Council members, workshops, symposia and irregular joint meetings with other societies dedicated to waterbird science and conservation. Student Presentation Awards are given at these meetings each year to promote student participation and to recognize excellence in scientific presentation.

== Journal ==
The society has published the journal Waterbirds, with the subtitle The International Journal of Waterbird Biology under its current namesake since 1999. Before that, the journal was called the Proceedings of the Colonial Waterbird Group from 1978 to 1980, and then, from 1981 to 1998, the journal was known as Colonial Waterbirds.

In 2013, the journal appointed the first woman Editor-in-Chief in the journal's history. In 2022, the journal appointed the first Editor-in-Chief from outside of North America. The same year, the journal also appointed its first Managing Editor, and the Editor-in-Chief instituted the first formal board of Associate Editors.

The journal has the following standard sections: Research papers and Short communications. In 2022, the Editor-in-Chief started the additional sections, Opinion, From the Field, and changed the cover to include a waterbird species representing one of the papers in that issue. The journal accepts manuscripts via their online portal supported by ScholarOne, and practices double-blind peer review.

The rejection rate of manuscripts submitted to the journal during 2022 was 43%, and time to final decision was 142 days. In 2023, the rejection rate increased to 33%, the days to final decision reduced to 139 days, and the impact factor improved from 0.22 to 0.69.

The Editor-in-Chiefs of the journal (from annual reports of the Waterbird Society) are listed below:

- 2022–2024: Dr. K. S. Gopi Sundar; Managing Editor: Dr. Paige Byerly.
- 2019–2021: Dr. Andrew Kasner.
- 2013–2018: Stephanie L. Jones.
- 2009–2012: Dr. Robert W. Elner.
- 2006–2008: Dr. Keith Hobson.

The Publication Committee of the Society selects a paper annually since 2016 towards the "Publication Award for Outstanding Contribution to Conservation".
