= Raptor Research Foundation =

US nonprofit organization

Raptor Handler with Raptor

The Raptor Research Foundation (RRF) is a United States–based ornithological society, focusing on the behavior, ecology, and conservation of birds of prey. It was founded on 11 February 1966 as a non-profit scientific society with the primary goal of accumulating and disseminating scientific information about hawks, eagles, falcons and owls. The RRF is a member of the Ornithological Council, and has been since 1992. The current head of the foundation is Rick Harness, who was recently appointed to this position in October 2026. The society meets once a year for the Annual Meeting of the Raptor Research Foundation in various locations. The 2026 meeting was in Duluth, Minnesota, and the 2027 meeting will be in Salt Lake City, Utah, at HawkWatch International. There, they attend workshops and go on field trips to bird watch in the area.

It publishes the quarterly journal The Journal of Raptor Research, which is a paid membership program, established in 1967. The contents of the journal are mostly Conservation Letters. These letters are intended to scientifically review various effects on raptor populations and conservation issues, as well as provide concrete evidence of such. The letters are made accessible to everyone who desires to read. It also used to publish a monthly newsletter called Wingspan, established in 1992, but it was retired in 2020. There are several other monetary donation methods including an endowment fund, a General Fund, and a Fund for Wings to Fly, a travel grant program.

The RRF makes several non-monetary awards: the Fran and Frederick Hamerstrom Award, which recognizes someone who has contributed significantly to the knowledge of raptor ecology and natural history, the Tom Cade Award, which recognizes someone who has made significant advances in the captive propagation and reintroduction of raptors, and the Partners for Raptors Lifetime Achievement Award, for outstanding individuals who have made significant contributions to the conservation of birds of prey. The Partners for Raptors Lifetime award used to be given out in collaboration with The Peregrine Fund. It also gives monetary grants to support raptor research. These grants and awards are given to applicants at the Annual Meeting of the Raptor Research Foundation.
