= Ornithological Society of the Middle East =

UK-based ornithological and birdwatching club

The Ornithological Society of the Middle East (OSME) is a British-based ornithological and birdwatching club for people interested in the birds of the Middle East, the Caucasus and Central Asia. It was established in April 1978 as a successor organisation to the Ornithological Society of Turkey, and in 2001 was expanded to cover central Asia and the Caucasus.

Its aims are, with regard to its area of interest, to collect, collate and publish ornithological data, encourage an interest in and conservation of the birds of the region, and to assist regional environmental and conservation organisations and natural history societies with ornithological studies and activities.

== Publications ==
OSME publishes the journal Sandgrouse.

== Member countries ==
The following territories of the Middle East are where OSME are active:

- Afghanistan
- Armenia
- Azerbaijan
- Bahrain
- Cyprus
- Djibouti
- Egypt
- Georgia
- Iran
- Iraq
- Israel
- Jordan
- Kazakhstan
- Kuwait
- Kyrgyzstan
- Lebanon
- Oman
- Palestine
- Russia (North Caucasus)
- Qatar
- Saudi Arabia
- Tajikistan
- Turkey
- Turkmenistan
- United Arab Emirates
- Uzbekistan
- Yemen
