= Hawaii Audubon Society =

American nonprofit organization

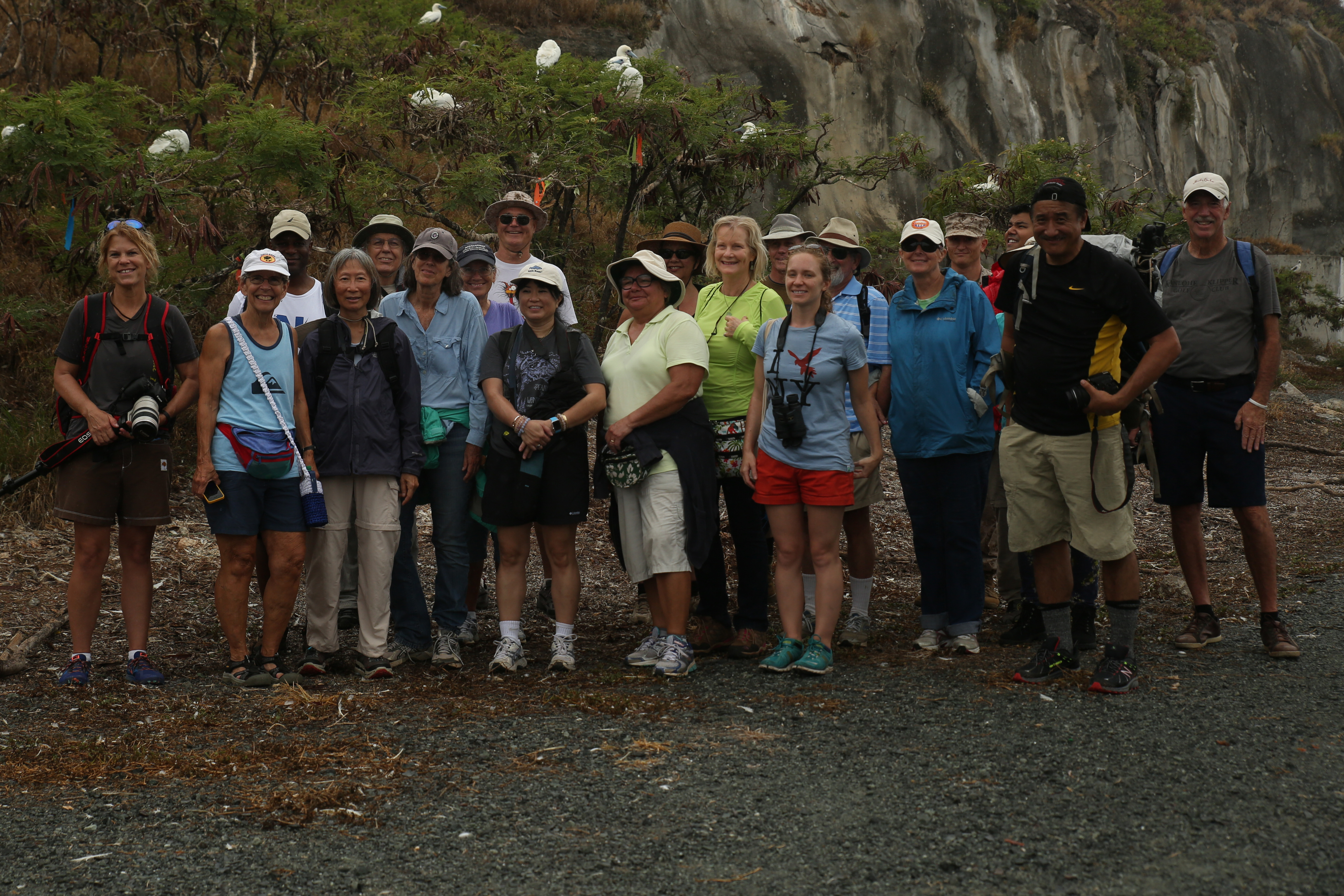
- Bird enthusiasts and members of the Hawaii Audubon Society pose for a photo July 10, 2015, at the Kaneohe Bay Range Training Facility aboard Marine Corps Base Hawaii. Bird enthusiasts and members of the society visited the base for a closer look at the red-footed booby, where a colony of approximately 2,500 birds nest.
- Formation: use 1939; 87 years ago
- Founder: Charles Dunn
- Purpose: Birding and bird conservation
- Headquarters: Honolulu
- Location: Hawaii
- Members: 1500
- Affiliations: National Audubon Society
- Website: hiaudubon.org

The Hawaii Audubon Society is a birding and bird conservation organisation in the American state of Hawaii. It was founded in 1939 by Charles Dunn, is based in Honolulu and is affiliated with the National Audubon Society. It has over 1,500 members throughout the state and produces a bimonthly peer-reviewed scientific journal, ‘Elepaio. It is named after a small Hawaiian bird. The journal was established in 1939.

== Mission ==
The mission of the Hawaii Audubon Society is to foster community values that result in the protection and restoration of native ecosystems and conservation of natural resources through education, science and advocacy in Hawaii and the Pacific.

One initiative of the Hawaii Audubon Society is the Pacific Fisheries Coalition, a joint project between the Society and the Hawai`i Fishermen's Foundation, to promote the protection and responsible use of marine resources through education and advocacy in the Pacific region.
