= Australasian Seabird Group =

The Australasian Seabird Group (ASG), the oldest of BirdLife Australia's special interest groups, was formed in 1971. Its objectives are to promote seabird research and conservation in Australasia. The ASG pursues its objectives through the coordination of its Beach Patrol project, publication of the ASG Bulletin and other seabird material, the organisation of symposia on issues affecting seabirds, and the presentation of expert opinion on the management and conservation of seabird populations in Australasia.

== Members ==
- Kerry-Jayne Wilson
