= Carolina Bird Club =

US non-profit organization

- Abbreviation: CBC
- Named after: North Carolina
- Formation: March 1937; 89 years ago
- Founder: John H. Grey Jr.
- Founded at: West Raleigh, North Carolina
- Type: Nonprofit
- Tax ID no.: 56-6054804
- Legal status: 501(c)(3)
- Headquarters: Raleigh, North Carolina
- President: Susan Campbell
- Main organ: The Chat
- Website: www.carolinabirdclub.org

The Carolina Bird Club (CBC), located in Raleigh, North Carolina, and founded on March 6, 1937, is a non-profit organization that promotes bird-watching as well as ornithological conservation and education efforts. It has published a bulletin known as The Chat since its founding in 1937. The current president of the Carolina Bird Club is Christine Stoughton of Merritt, NC.

== History ==
The Carolina Bird Club was founded after the pastor of the West Raleigh Presbyterian Church, John H. Grey Jr., proposed the creation of a state bird club. The six other founding members were:

- H.H. Brimley, Director of the State Museum
- C.S. Brimley, State Entomologist for the North Carolina Department of Agriculture and brother of H.H. Brimley, who together co-authored Birds of North Carolina (Pearson et al., 1919)
- Harry T. Davis, member of the State Museum and later its director
- Carey Bostian, a professor of zoology at North Carolina State College
- Mrs. Green, a member of the Raleigh Woman's Club and nature columnist for The News & Observer
- A seventh person whose name is unknown

After Grey declined the presidency to act instead as secretary, treasurer, and editor, Clement S. Brimley was selected as the club's first president.
