= Pacific Seabird Group =

US-based ornithological society

The Pacific Seabird Group (PSG) is an international professional ornithological society based in the US, dedicated to the study and conservation of Pacific seabirds and their environment. The objectives of the Pacific Seabird Group are exclusively scientific, educational, conservational, and nonprofit. In furtherance of these objectives, PSG's principal activities are (1) to increase the amount and quality of scientific research on Pacific seabirds, (2) to educate PSG's members and the general public of the ecology and importance of Pacific seabirds and their environment, (3) to disseminate publications and other information to accomplish this end, and (4) to advocate for the conservation of Pacific seabirds wherever they occur.focusing on the behavior, ecology, and conservation of seabirds.

== History ==
It was founded in 1972, by William R.P. Bourne, Ph.D., James G. King, James C. Bartonek, as an association of professional seabird researchers and managers. It aims to increase the quality and quantity of seabird research by facilitating information exchange, to assess threats to seabird populations, and to provide government agencies and others with expert advice on managing them.

== Organization ==
The Pacific Seabird Group is governed by an Executive Council, which includes a student representative, and representatives from Alaska/Russia, Washington/Oregon, Northern California, Southern California/Latin America/Hawaii, non-Pacific US states, Canada, Asia/Oceania, and Europe/Africa. Membership on the Executive Council is decided by an annual election by the membership. Membership is open to "all persons interested in Pacific seabirds and/or their environment." There are Individual Members, Life Members, Honorary Members, Student Members, Corresponding Members, and Sponsored Members. Dues are paid annually.

The PSG is a member of the Ornithological Council, the World Seabird Union, and the American Bird Conservancy.

== Publications ==
Pacific Seabirds is a biannual (spring and fall) publication with news and events of interest to the membership. It continues the Pacific Seabird Group Bulletin.

Since 2000, the PSG has published the open-access, peer-reviewed journal Marine Ornithology on behalf of a consortium of seabird groups from across the world. Marine Ornithology is published 2–3 times a year, and is the continuation of the African Seabird Group's journal Cormorant.

== Annual meeting ==
Since its inception, the PSG has hosted an annual meeting of members. In 2008, the first annual meeting outside North America was held in Hakodate, Japan. The most recent meeting was held in La Jolla, California, US, in February 2023. Dates, venues, and some abstracts of prior meetings can be found on the PSG website.

== Awards ==
At each annual meeting, awards are presented for the best student oral and poster presentations. A Lifetime Achievement Award and Special Achievement Award may also be presented.

Year	Meeting Location	Lifetime Achievement Award	Special Achievement Award
2024	Seattle, Washington		
2023	La Jolla, California		Hsiao-Wei Yuan, Shui-Hua Chen, and Simba Chan
2022	virtual		
2021	virtual		
2020	Portland, Oregon		
2019	Lihue, Hawaii		
2018	La Paz, Mexico		
2017	Tacoma, Washington	P. Dee Boersma, Sarah Wanless	Martin Raphael
2016	Oahu, Hawaii	Larry B. Spear	Lindsay Young; Gus Van Vliet
2015	San Jose, California	David Ainley	
2014	Juneau, Alaska	Anthony Gaston	Vivian Mendenhall
2013	Portland, Oregon	Malcolm Coulter	None
2012	Oahu, Hawaii	John Cooper	None
2010	Long Beach, California	Daniel W. Anderson	Frank Gress
2009	Hakodate, Japan	Haruo Ogi	Yutaka Watanuki
2008	Blaine, Washington	John Croxall	Lora Leschner, and S. Kim Nelson
2007	Pacific Grove, California	Michael P. Harris	Edward F. Melvin
2006	Girdwood, Alaska	G. Vernon Byrd	Mark Rauzon
2005	Portland, Oregon	Spencer G. Sealy	None
2004	La Paz, Mexico		None
2003	Parksville, British Columbia		None
2002	Santa Barbara, California	Philip & Myrtle Ashmole	None
2001	Lihue, Kauai, Hawaii	None	Hiroshi Hasegawa
2000	Napa, California	Richard G. B. Brown	Malcolm Coulter & Steven M. Speich
1999	Blaine, Washington	John Warnham	
1998	Monterey, California		George J. Divoky & Craig S. Harrison
1997	Portland, Oregon	William R.P. Bourne, James G. King, James C. Bartonek (co-founders PSG)	
1996		Charles J. Guiget	None
1995		Miklos D. Udvardy	None
1994		Thomas R. Howell	None
1993	Sacramento, California	First Award ever given by PSG: Karl W. Kenyon	Arthur L. Sowls

== Advocacy ==
The PSG often comments on government proposals or legal actions concerning seabird conservation issues. In the past, it has written regarding Marine Protected Areas in the western United States, American white pelican management plans, the eradication of introduced mammals from islands, and decisions on the listing of species in endangered species legislation.
