= British Ornithologists' Club =

The British Ornithologists' Club (BOC) aims to promote discussion between members and others interested in ornithology, and to facilitate the dissemination of scientific information concerned with ornithology. The BOC has a special interest in avian systematics, taxonomy and distribution.

The BOC was founded at a meeting of 15 members of the British Ornithologists' Union held in Covent Garden, London on 5 October 1892. This was at a time when individuals and expeditions were exploring remote parts of the world, discovering many new species of birds in the process and the BOC was formed to enable members to meet regularly to present papers, exhibit specimens and engage in discussion on wider ornithological matters. The BOC has continued to meet regularly in London (with occasional meetings elsewhere) and, as at June 2012, has held 970 meetings. Meetings now take the form of a talk followed by discussion, with refreshments available afterwards. Meetings are free and are open to members and non-members alike.

The BOC has published Bulletin of the British Ornithologists' Club (The Bulletin, or Bull. B.O.C.) since its formation. The Bulletin, which is published four times a year, focuses in particular on avian systematics, taxonomy, nomenclature and distribution worldwide. It regularly contains papers:

- describing new species and subspecies of birds;
- giving an account of the rediscovery of a species not seen for many years;
- describing for the first time the nest and/or breeding behaviour of a little-studied species;
- giving an account of an expedition to a rarely visited part of the world, listing the species found (sometimes extending their known range) and commenting on the absence of species which previous expeditions had recorded,
- suggesting the actual location where poorly documented museum specimens may have been taken and uncovering cases where specimens have been mislabelled.

The BOC has a membership of around 370 (2011) almost half of whom live outside the United Kingdom. Membership is open to anyone with an interest in ornithology. Members formerly received printed copies of The Bulletin, but from March 2017 (Vol. 137 No. 1), it became an online-only, open access, journal.

The BOC is a registered Charitable Incorporated Organization in England and Wales (no. 1169733).
