= New York State Ornithological Association =

US nonprofit organization

- Abbreviation: NYSOA
- Formation: 1948; 78 years ago
- Type: Nonprofit
- Tax ID no.: 11-6101437
- Website: nybirds.org

The New York State Ornithological Association (NYSOA), established in 1948, is New York's ornithological society. Its objectives are to "document the ornithology of New York State; to foster interest in and appreciation of birds; and to protect birds and their habitats." The NYSOA contains 44 bird clubs, Audubon Societies, and nature organizations, and it endorses the Code of Birding Ethics developed by the American Birding Association. Its current president is Anne Swaim. Historical archives are available online at the Cornell University Library. The NYSOA publishes The Kingbird, a quarterly journal of ornithology.
