= Jeremy Greenwood =

British ornithologist

- Occupation: Ornithologist
- Employer: British Trust for Ornithology (1988–2007)
- Awards: Commander of the Order of the British Empire (2007)

Jeremy John Denis Greenwood CBE (born 7 September 1942) is a British ornithologist and was Director of the British Trust for Ornithology (BTO) from 1988 until he retired in September 2007.

Greenwood was educated at Royal Grammar School Worcester and St Catherine's College, Oxford.

Prior to working at the BTO, he spent 20 years as a lecturer in biological sciences at the University of Dundee. He is also president of the European Ornithologists Union. He is also an honorary Professor at the University of Birmingham's Centre for Ornithology. He was responsible for publishing the two largest surveys on British bird populations.

Since 2000, he has been a trustee of The British Birds Charitable Trust, which publishes British Birds magazine On retirement from the BTO, he took up an honorary professorship with the Centre for Research into Ecological and Environmental Modelling, at the University of St. Andrews.

He was appointed a Commander of the Order of the British Empire (CBE) in the 2008 New Year Honours, "for services to conservation".

In 2020, his book written with James Parry, about the ornithologist and photographer Emma Turner, was published.

== Bibliography ==
- The EBCC Atlas of European Breeding Birds, T & A D Poyser, 1997 ISBN 0-85661-091-7 (contributor)
- Parry, James; Greenwood, Jeremy (2020). Emma Turner : a life looking at birds. Norwich: Norfolk & Norwich Naturalists' Society. ISBN 978-1-9162537-1-1.
