= Brett Westwood =

Radio presenter and author

- Born: 1959 or 1960 (age 64–65)
- Occupation: Radio presenter
- Awards: Dilys Breese Medal

Brett Westwood is a radio presenter and author, specialising in natural history. He regularly presents episodes of BBC Radio 4's series The Living World and Nature, as well as his own short series, several of which are available from the BBC website. He is a co-presenter with Philippa Forrester of World on the Move, a BBC Radio 4 series that started in 2008 on migration in the animal kingdom. He is active in the West Midland Bird Club, Worcestershire Wildlife Trust, and for the Worcestershire Biological Records Centre, which all cover the area around his home town of Stourbridge.

In 2009, he was one of the first recipients of the British Trust for Ornithology's Dilys Breese Medal, at a ceremony at the House of Lords.

His drawings of birds often appear in, and on the cover of, West Midland Bird Club Bulletins.

He participated in a bird race as part of the 2010 series of the BBC's Springwatch. In 2016 and 2017 he also presented slots at BST08:00, 13:00 and 16:00 on the web cam live broadcasts for Springwatch.

On 2 June 2015, Westwood presented the first in a 25-week series, Natural Histories, made in partnership with London's Natural History Museum. The 30-minute programmes set out to tell 'the stories of 25 species that have managed to get under the skin of human society and change the way we see the world.'

== Bibliography ==
- Nature of Worcestershire with Harry Green, (Barracuda Books, 1991) ISBN 0-86023-487-8
- Great White Shark: Habitats, Life Cycles, Food Chains, Threats (Heinemann Library, 2000) ISBN 0-7398-2029-X
- Worcestershire Countryside: All the Areas of Open Countryside Accessible for You to Wander with David Minton (Illustrator), (Reardon Publishing, 2002) ISBN 1-872454-03-8

== Education ==
He studied at King Edward's School, Birmingham.

=== Radio programmes ===
- Behind The Taverna
- Land Lines
- A Tomb With A View
- Living World (some episodes only)
- Nature (some episodes only)
- A Guide to Garden Birds
- Saving Species
- Natural Histories (from 2 June 2015), 11:00am Tuesdays, BBC Radio 4

=== Sample articles ===
- Worcestershire Record: Hornet
- Worcestershire Record: Big Hoverflies in Stourbridge
