= EBBC =

EBBC may refer to:

- EBBC (Den Bosch), a Dutch basketball club
- East Bay Bicycle Coalition, a California advocacy group

== See also ==
- European Bird Census Council
