= EURING =

EURING may refer to:

- European Engineer (EUR ING), an international professional qualification
- European Union for Bird Ringing (EURING), an organisation for co-operation between European bird ringing schemes
