= Emma Turner =

Emma Turner may refer to:

- Emma Louisa Turner (1866–1940), British ornithologist and bird photographer
- a pseudonym for Martha Tabram (1849–1888), murdered English prostitute
