= Harriet Mead =

English wildlife artist

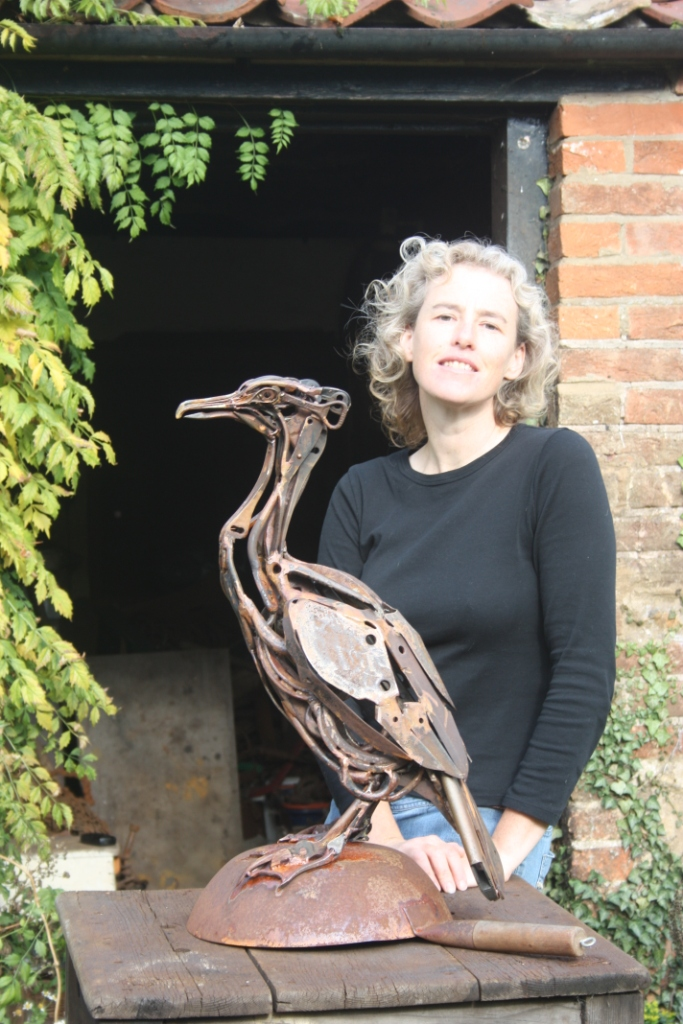
- Born: 2 September 1969 (age 56); Tring, England
- Education: St Albans College, Norwich School of Art
- Known for: Wildlife art, installation art, sculpture
- Notable work: Suffolk Trinity
- Awards: Capmark Wildlife Award 2007

Harriet Rebecca Mead (born 2 September 1969) is an English wildlife artist specialising in metal sculptures.

Mead's work is inspired by animals and birds. From an early age she was encouraged to observe and develop a keen interest in British wildlife due to the influence of her late father, Chris Mead, who was a well-known author and broadcaster. She uses personal experiences and direct observation to provide inspiration for her work. The countryside and wildlife around her home in Hilborough in rural Norfolk and her travels in Asia and Africa, provide subject matter for her work. She received formal art education during a foundation year at St Albans College, followed by a degree in Fine Art at the Norwich School of Art.

After showing at its annual show for several years, Mead was elected a full member of the Society of Wildlife Artists, SWLA. In 2004, she was elected to Council of the SWLA and won the Society's Capmark Award in 2007 and was runner-up in 2006. In 2009, she was elected as the Society's President, making her the youngest and first woman to hold the post in the Society's 47-year history. Mead continued to hold the position of president through at least October 2020.

== Her work ==
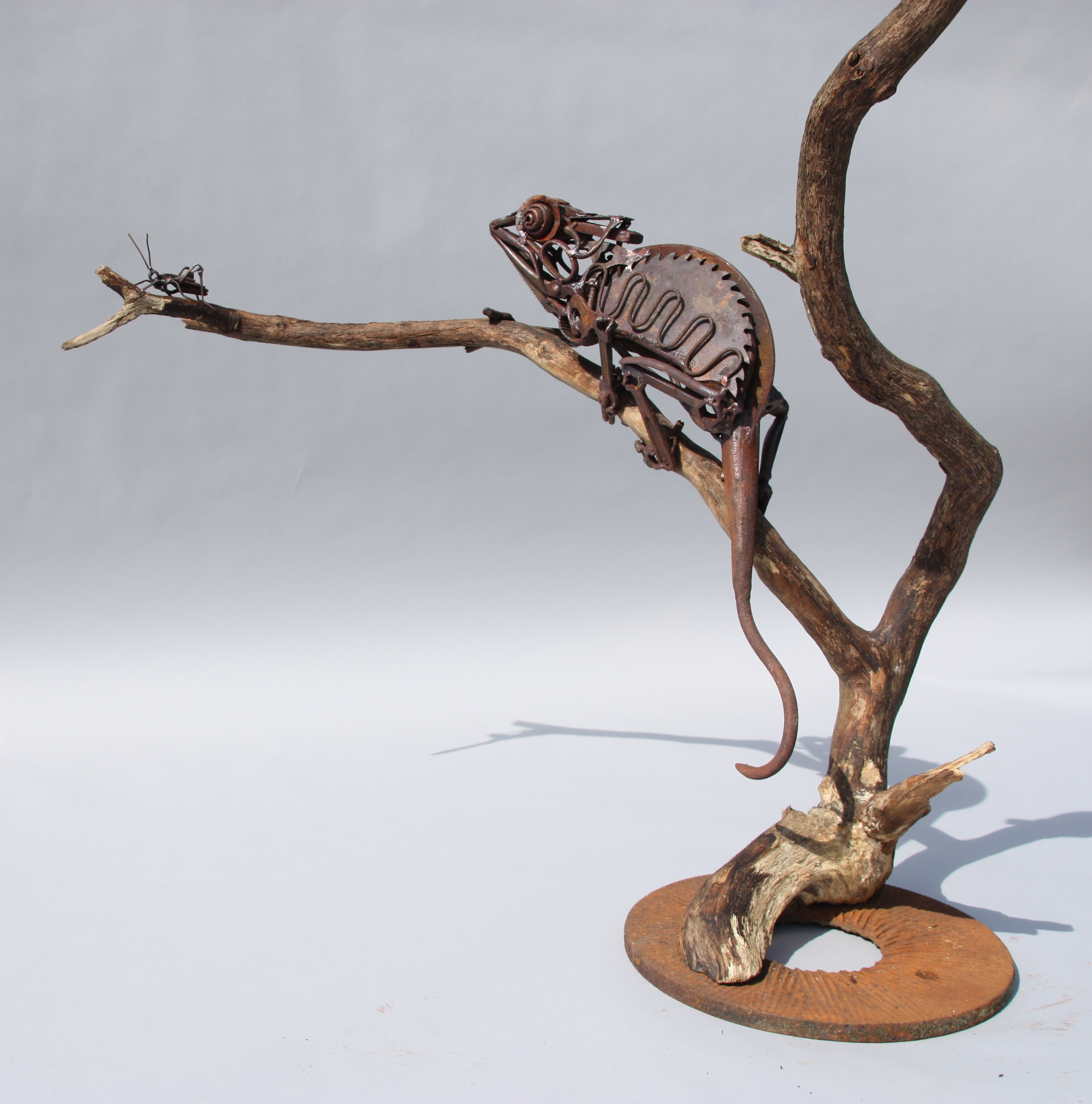
Chameleon by Harriet Mead

Although predominately a sculptor, Mead also produces drawings and prints, but focuses on using steel to create her sculptures. Her steel sculptures fall into two categories;- the "true-to-life" form made predominantly from sheet steel that resemble as accurately as possible the species being created, and "found objects" in which Mead uses everyday objects to produce an abstract form of the animal.

Mead tends to work to commission, but does maintain a few examples of her work in key galleries. She seems to be able to tackle any subject from the natural world.

== Art and conservation ==
Peafowl by Harriet Mead

Mead has used her art to promote and raise funds for conservation and animal charities. Most notably amongst the organisations she has supported are the Game and Wildlife Conservation Trust, the Countryside Education Foundation and the Suffolk Horse Society. Together with other leading international wildlife artists Mead has taken part in two Artists for Nature Foundation projects, which bring artists together to promote and raise funds for conservation projects around the world, including the Great Fen Project in Cambridgeshire, and the Hula Valley in Israel.

== Public art ==
Suffolk Trinity by Harriet Mead

Mead has produced two large-scale public art pieces. One is the Suffolk Trinity which includes a life-size Suffolk Punch horse, a Suffolk Ram and a Suffolk Redpoll Bull providing an impressive feature at the entrance of Trinity Park (the Suffolk show ground), near Ipswich. The other is a life-size heavy horse being led by a man at Dromore, West Tyrone, Northern Ireland.

== Awards ==
In 2023, Mead was awarded the Dilys Breese Medal of the British Trust for Ornithology.
