= Eric Vernon Watson =

British bryologist (1914–1999)

- Born: 12 May 1914
- Died: 25 October 1999 (aged 85); Goring-on-Thames
- Education: Cranleigh School
- Alma mater: University of Edinburgh
- Known for: British Mosses and Liverworts
- Spouse: Joyce Edwards
- Children: 4
- Scientific career
- Fields: Bryology
- Workplaces: Harper Adams University; University of Reading
- Thesis: Studies in the anatomy of anomalous monocotyledons (1938)

Eric Vernon Watson (1914–1999) was a British bryologist. His book British Mosses and Liverworts was for many years the standard work on the bryophyte flora for the British Isles. He had a major influence on developing identification skills of the British and Irish bryophyte flora.

== Early life ==
Watson was born 12 May 1914 in Cranleigh, Surrey, the second of three brothers. His younger brother, Donald (1918–2005) was a Scottish ornithologist and a wildlife artist. His father, James George Watson, was a Scottish banker and financial manager who was away in Africa, so he was raised largely by his mother, May (née Pearson). Watson attended Cranleigh School with his brothers, but in 1931, when his father died, the family moved to Edinburgh and Watson went to Edinburgh University to read Botany (B.Sc. in 1935).

He stayed on at Edinburgh to take a Ph.D. studying under Prof Sir William Wright Smith. He obtained his Ph.D. in 1938, his thesis "Studies in the anatomy of anomalous monocotyledons" winning him the Hutton Balfour prize for Botany (established by the philanthropist Robert Halliday Gunning). He developed an interest in Bryology at Edinburgh, helped by William Young (1865–1947), Keeper of the bryological herbarium at the Royal Botanic Garden. Watson, together with his brother Donald, were among the first members of the newly founded Scottish Ornithologists' Club in 1933. The two young men helped to set up a bird observatory on the Isle of May in the Firth of Forth, and Watson assisted in building the first ‘Heligoland trap’ for catching and ringing migrant birds.

== Academic career ==
After Edinburgh he worked (1938–39) at Liverpool University as a demonstrator, which is where he met his future wife, Joyce Edwards (1920–2009). In 1939 he was supported by a Commonwealth Fund Fellowship at Harvard for two years, returning as senior lecturer at Harper Adams Agricultural College, Newport, Shropshire (1941–46). He joined the staff at the University of Reading in 1946 as a lecturer, later senior lecturer, until he retired in 1979. He led bryophyte forays throughout his career and continued to do so after retirement.

He joined the British Bryological Society in 1946, became its president in 1964 and then became an honorary member. He was a member of the Botanical Society of the British Isles for almost 50 years. His book British Mosses and Liverworts, which went into three editions, was for many years the standard work on the bryophyte flora for the British Isles. His line drawings (and some photographs by R. H. Hall) illustrated key features. His second book Structure and Life of Bryophytes, which also went into three editions, introduced the morphology of mosses and liverworts as far as it was known at the time.

His personal collection of bryophyte specimens was left to the Royal Botanic Garden, Edinburgh after his death.

== Personal life and death ==
He and Joyce Edwards were married in 1944 in Ulverston, and had four daughters. Watson was also a keen ornithologist, being a founder member of the Reading Bird Club, gardener, golfer, and watercolour artist, exhibiting at the Reading Guild of Artists. In addition he was knowledgeable about poetry. He died at his home in Goring from leukemia, 25 October 1999. His bryophyte collection was left to the Royal Botanic Garden, Edinburgh.

== Selected publications ==
- A Study of the anatomy of Trichopus zeylanicus Gaertn. Watson, Eric Vernon (1936). Notes Roy. Bot. Gard. Edinburgh, 93:135–56.
- The Mosses of Barra, Outer Hebrides. Watson, E. V., (1939). Transactions and Proceedings of the Botanical Society of Edinburgh 32:516–541.
- The Dynamic approach to plant structure and its relation to modern taxonomic botany. Watson, Eric Vernon (1943). Biol. Rev., 18:65–77.
- Further observations on the bryophyte flora of the Isle of May: ii. Rate of succession in selected communities involving bryophytes. Watson, Eric Vernon. (1960). Trans. Proc. Bot. Soc. Edinburgh, 39:85–106.
- A Quantitative Study of the Bryophytes of Chalk Grassland. E. V. Watson (1960). Journal of Ecology, 48(2):397–414
- British Mosses and Liverworts. Eric Vernon Watson. (1955, 1968, 1981). Cambridge University Press ISBN 9780521067416
- The Structure and Life of Bryophytes. E.V. Watson (1964, 1967, 1971). Hutchinson Universal Library ISBN 9780091093013
- Studies of bryophyte distribution since the time of E. M. Holmes: a review with emphasis on the recent literature. (1973). Botanical Journal of the Linnean Society, 67(1):33–46, doi:10.1111/j.1095-8339.1973.tb01730.x
- The recording activities of the BBS (1923–83) and their impact on advancing knowledge. Watson, E. V., (1985). In Longton, R.E. and Perry, A.R. (eds.) British Bryological Society Diamond Jubilee. British Bryological Society Special Volume Number 1. 17–29. Cardiff.
