= Old Bodney Camp =

Protected area in Norfolk, England

Coordinates: 52.557°N 0.725°E

- Site of Special Scientific Interest
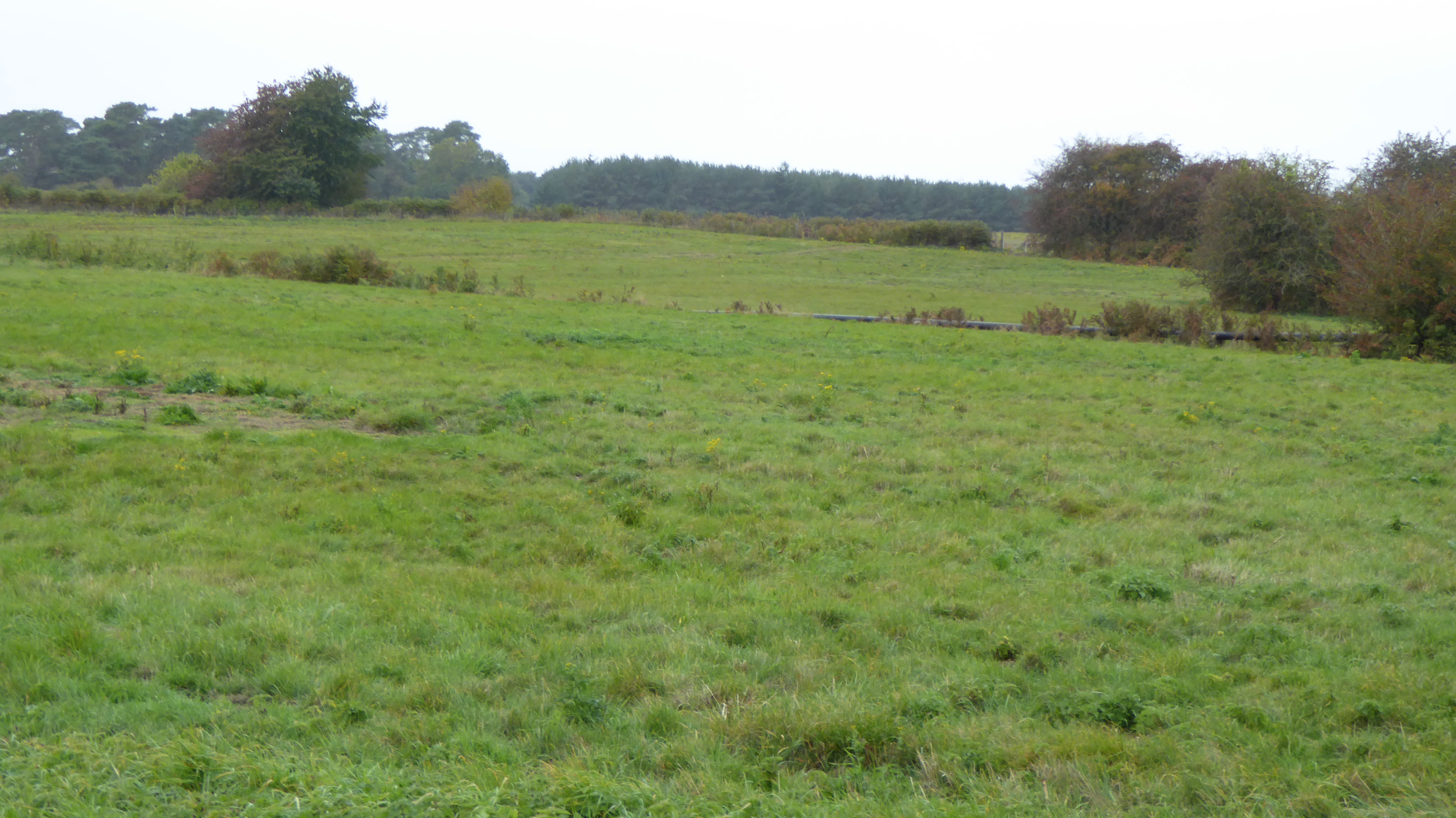
- Location of Old Bodney Camp.
- Area of search: Norfolk
- Grid reference: TL 848 990
- Interest: Biological
- Area: 32.8 hectares (81 acres)
- Notification date: 1986
- Location map: Magic Map

Old Bodney Camp is a 32.8-hectare (81-acre) biological Site of Special Scientific Interest in Norfolk, England. It is in the parish of Hilborough, between Bodney to the east and Little Cressingham to the west. It is part of the Breckland Special Protection Area. The boundaries of Old Bodney Camp SSSI are contiguous with the boundaries of Breckland Farmland SSSI.

This area of heath is maintained by rabbit grazing. It has some areas of grassland and others dominated by lichen and moss. There are two nationally rare moths, Noctua orbona and Scopula rubiginata, which are almost confined to the Breckland region.

The site is private land with no public access. Part of the land within Old Bodney Camp SSSI is owned by the Ministry of Defence.
