= E. V. Baxter =

Scottish ornithologist

Evelyn Vida Baxter LLD FRSE FLS FZS MBE
- Born: 29 March 1879; Gilston, Fife, Scotland
- Died: 1 October 1959 (aged 80); The Grove, Kirkton of Largo, Fife
- Awards: Union Medal of the British Ornithological Union
- Scientific career
- Fields: bird migration

Evelyn Vida Baxter LLD FRSE FLS FZS MBE (29 March 1879 - 1 October 1959) was a Scottish naturalist and ornithologist, and the first woman to receive Union Medal of the British Ornithological Union.

== Life ==
Baxter was born on 29 March 1879 to John Henry Baxter and his wife at Gilston, Fife.

She took an interest in natural history and especially in bird migration, and after being encouraged by Eagle Clarke in 1905, she and her life-long friend Leonora Jeffrey Rintoul (1878-1953) took up bird studies at the Isle of May. They studied the movements of birds for 20 years leading to several publications, including The Birds of Scotland in 1953. Baxter's obituary notes that in Rintoul, Baxter found "a kindred spirit and inseparable companion".

With Rintoul, H F D Elder, and George Waterston, Baxter was one of the co-founders the Scottish Ornithologists' Club on 24 March 1936. The pair served jointly as President and then Honorary Presidents.

During World War II she volunteered with the Women's Land Army while also teaching at Sunday school where she was known as "Miss Evie". For her wartime work she was awarded an MBE in 1945. Along with Rintoul, Baxter became, in 1951, the only non-graduates out of eight women Fellows of the Royal Society of Edinburgh.

She became the first woman Vice President of the British Ornithologists' Union and received their Union Medal in 1959, the first woman to do so. In 1955 the University of Glasgow awarded her the honorary of Doctor of Laws (LLD).

She died at The Grove, Kikton of Largo, Fife.

== Publications ==
All these works were co-written with Leonora Jeffrey Rintoul

- Report on Scottish ornithology in 1911, including migration (1912)
- The Birds of the Isle of May (1918)
- Some Breeding Scottish Duck (1922)
- The Geographical Distribution and Status of Birds in Scotland (1928)
- A vertebrate fauna of Forth (1935)
- Birds of Scotland (1953)
