= Ward J. M. Hagemeijer =

Dutch ecologist and author

Ward J. M. Hagemeijer is a Dutch ecologist and author who publishes about birds and about wetlands. In 1997 Hagemeijer authored The EBCC Atlas of European Breeding Birds.

== Studies of avian influenza ==
In 2005, while working as an ecologist with Wetlands International (Wageningen, Netherlands), Hagemeijer was quoted in the press responding to fears of a widespread outbreak of H5N1 influenza. In September of that year, in response to observed outbreaks in Romania and Turkey, Hagemeijer hypothesized further spread of the disease: "The next step we expect the virus to take is into Africa, because that is on the main migratory route for birds. The first birds are already in east Africa." By December of that year, as events unfolded, he was quoted widely in the Associated Press: "There is more and more evidence building up that wild migratory birds do play some role in spreading the virus, but personally I believe — and others agree — that it's not a major role. If we would assume based on this evidence that wild birds would be a major carrier of the disease we would expect a more dramatic outbreak of the disease all over the world." An alternative hypothesis was that the virus was specialized to spread rapidly in domestic poultry. In Hagemeijer's opinion, a February 2006 outbreak in Nigeria was more likely caused by shipment of domestic poultry than transmission in the wild, because key areas along the flight path such as the Nile Delta seemed to have been skipped over.

Ward went on to publish five scientific papers in 2007 and 2008 detailing his observations of H5N1 and H5N2 avian influenza in wild bird populations.

== See also ==
- Publications and coauthors at ResearchGate
- Publications at PubMed, including several papers on avian influenza in wild birds with full text available in PubMed Central
