= Dilys Breese Medal =

The Dilys Breese Medal is a medal awarded by the British Trust for Ornithology . It recognises communicators who help to deliver ornithological science to new audiences. It is named in memory of film maker Dilys Breese, who died in 2007, and was inaugurated in 2009, funded by a bequest from Breese. The medal features a design by Robert Gillmor, showing a robin in front of a TV screen.

The inaugural awards were made in November 2009, to six recipients at a ceremony at the House of Lords.

== Dilys Breese Medallists ==
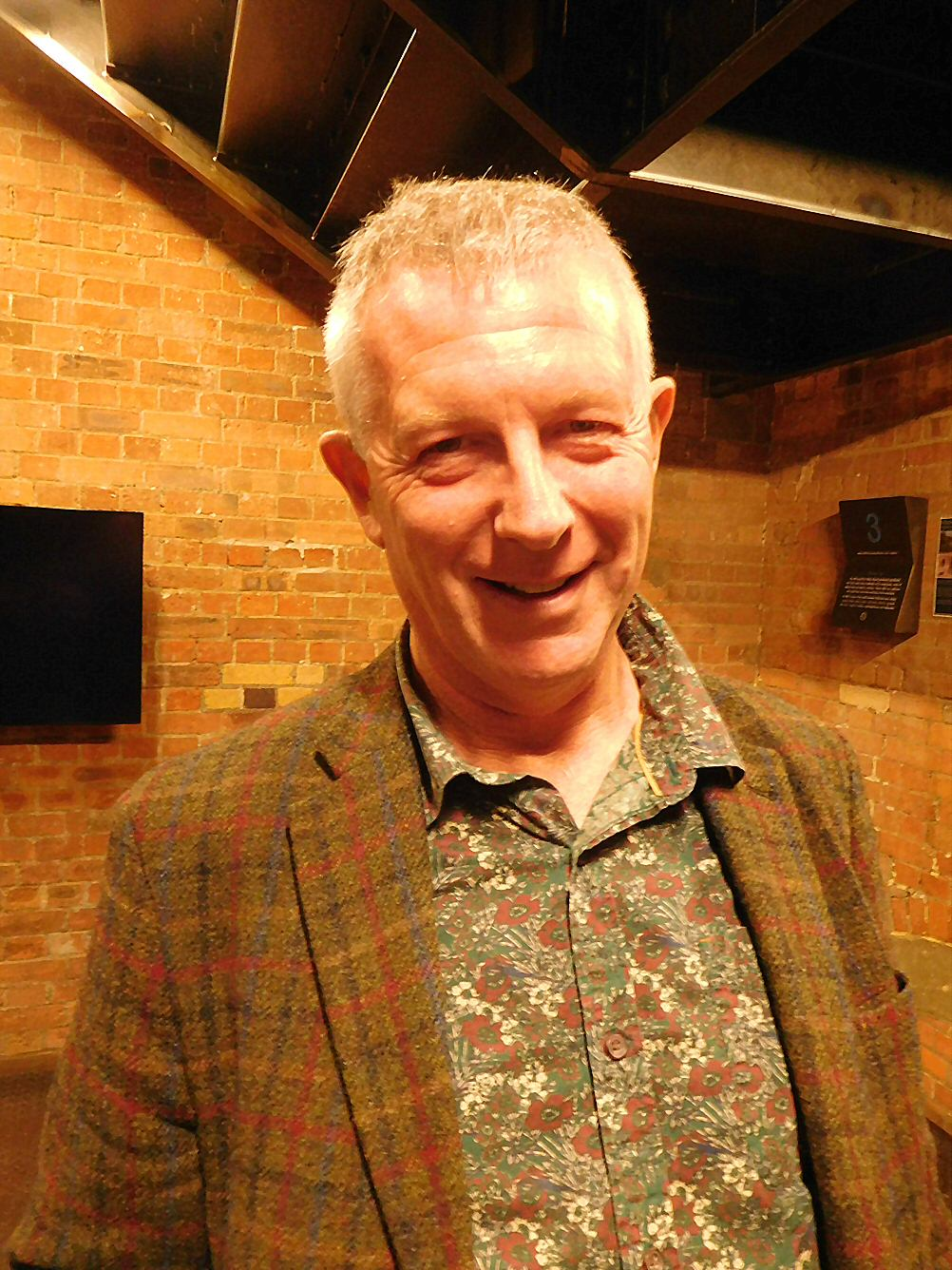
Stephen Moss, medallist in 2009

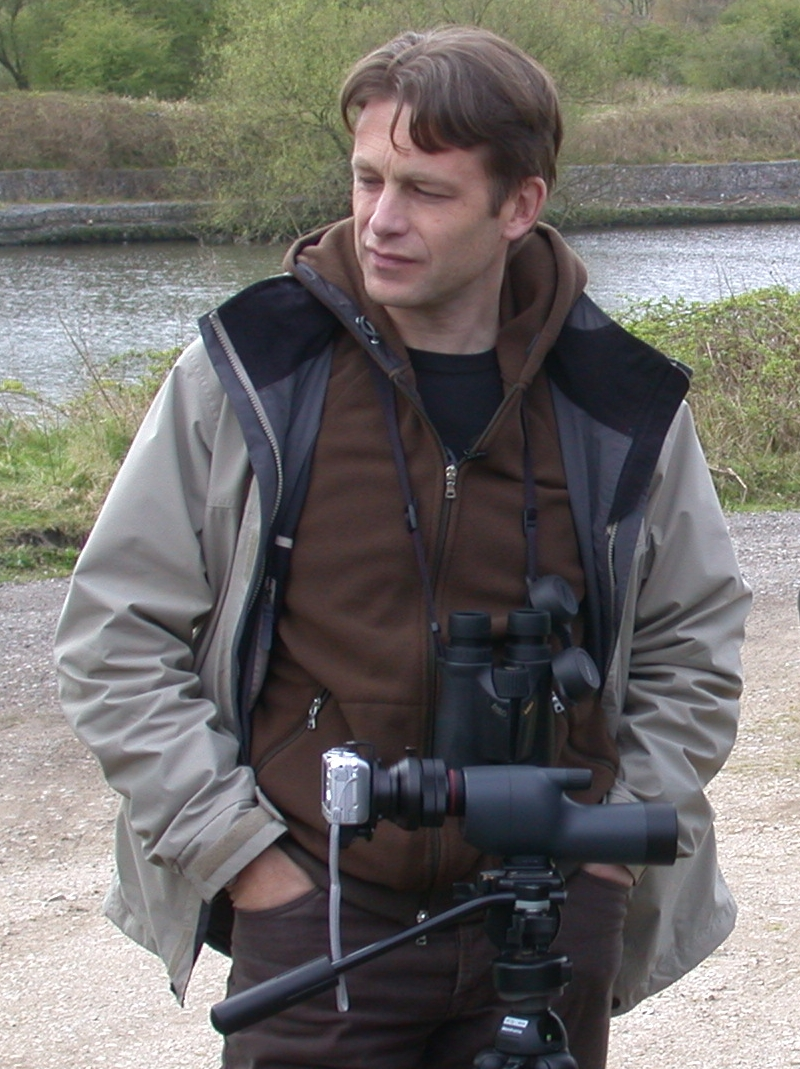
Chris Packham, medallist in 2010

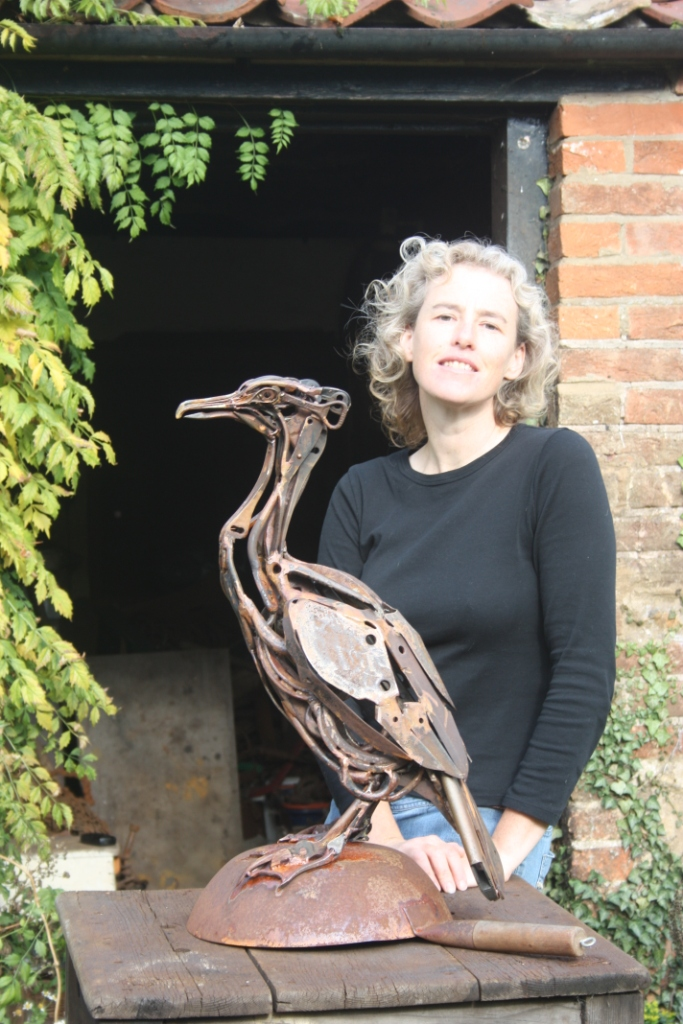
Harriet Mead, medallist in 2023

- 2009: Fiona Barclay of BirdGuides
- 2009: Ray Collier
- 2009: Stephen Moss
- 2009: Tony Soper
- 2009: Brett Westwood
- 2009: Stuart Winter
- 2010: Chris Packham
- 2011: Michael McCarthy
- 2012: Sheena Harvey
- 2013: John Ingham
- 2014: Victoria Gill
- 2015: Ben Hoare
- 2016: Dr Max Whitby
- 2017: Mary Colwell
- 2018: Martin Hughes-Games
- 2019: Lesley Dolphin
- 2020: Graham Appleton
- 2021: Dominic Couzens
- 2022: Kit Jewitt
- 2023: Harriet Mead & Jack Baddams
- 2024: Megan McCubbin
- 2025: Julian Hughes
- 2026: Brigit Strawbridge

== See also ==
- List of ornithology awards
