= BirdTrack =

- Main page, as seen on 25 April 2016
- Owner: BirdTrack Partners
- Website: www.birdtrack.net
- Commercial: No
- Registration: Required for data entry

BirdTrack is an online citizen science website, operated by the British Trust for Ornithology (BTO) on behalf of a partnership of the BTO, the RSPB, BirdWatch Ireland, the Scottish Ornithologists' Club and the Welsh Ornithological Society (Welsh: Cymdeithas Adaryddol Cymru). It is also available though mobile apps.

BirdTrack allows birdwatchers to record the names and numbers of birds seen in a specified location anywhere in the world. It acts as a log for those wishing to maintain lists of their own sightings, but also feeds data into various scientific surveys, is used for research and conservation purposes, and generates maps for public consumption. The maps are rendered using OpenStreetMap data.

BirdTrack is part of WorldBirds, a global initiative to record bird sightings.

In October 2014, data from BirdTrack was used as evidence in the conviction of a gamekeeper for illegally killing ten Common Buzzards and an Eurasian Sparrowhawk.
