= Philippa Forrester =

English television & radio presenter, producer, author (born 1968)

- Born: Philippa Clare Ryan Forrester; 20 September 1968 (age 58); Winchester, Hampshire, England
- Other name: Philippa Clare Ryan Hamilton James
- Education: Westgate School; Peter Symonds College; University of Birmingham
- Occupations: Television and radio presenter; producer; author
- Years active: 1986–present
- Spouse: Charlie Hamilton James (m. 2004; div. 2020)
- Children: 3

Philippa Clare Ryan Forrester (born 20 September 1968) is a British television and radio presenter, producer and author.

Forrester has presented shows including CBBC, Tomorrow's World, Crufts, The Heaven and Earth Show and Robot Wars.

In 2015, Forrester moved with her family to Wyoming, US to support her husband's work with National Geographic magazine.

== Education ==
Forrester was educated at Westgate School, a co-educational comprehensive school in Winchester, Hampshire, and at Peter Symonds College in the same city. She holds a degree in English from the University of Birmingham, and a degree in Ecology and Conservation from Birkbeck, University of London.

== Broadcasting career ==
Forrester first worked as a children's presenter for BFBS television in 1986, and was often seen reading out birthday cards onscreen. She became a presenter on Children's BBC from the early 1990s, becoming a more regular fixture alongside Toby Anstis from July 1990 until 1994. She then hosted many programmes including Tomorrow's World, Barking Mad, The Heaven and Earth Show and Robot Wars series 1–3, 5, and 6 before being replaced by Jayne Middlemiss for series 7.

She also co-presented the BBC's coverage of the solar eclipse of August 1999. At the end of the same year, she was also part of the corporation's team covering the turn of the new millennium, and was duped into appearing on the spoof documentary Brass Eye's 2001 paedophilia special, in which she wore a large pair of gloves, and explained how a paedophile could use them to touch children through a screen, such as a television screen.

She was a co-presenter with Brett Westwood on World on the Move, a BBC Radio 4 series that started in 2008 on migration in the animal kingdom.

In September 2013, she co-presented the BBC show Harvest, which followed the progress of Britain's vegetable, cereal and fruit harvests.

As of January 2022, she was presenting a YouTube series about switching to an electric car sponsored by Hendy.

== TV production ==
Forrester's first collaboration with her husband was My Halcyon River. Following its success, in 2003 they set up a production company, Halcyon Media, which specialises in wildlife productions. In 2007, they co-produced An Otter in the Family, a short documentary series about the adoption of an otter cub called Grace and their attempts to raise her as a wild animal in order to be released into the wild.

Forrester and her husband also produced the four-part Halcyon River Diaries, the first episode of which was broadcast in May 2010 on BBC1. The series follows the wildlife found near their home. An additional episode was shown at Christmas 2010.

== Personal life ==
Forrester married wildlife cameraman and producer Charlie Hamilton James in July 2004. She is an environmentalist. She took a part-time degree in Ecology and Conservation at Birkbeck, University of London while presenting Tomorrow's World, graduating with first class honours.

She has been vice-president of St Tiggywinkles wildlife hospital and Patron of the Seahorse Trust with Nick Baker, Vice-President of the Avon Wildlife Trust with Simon King and is a brand ambassador for Anglian Windows.

She supported the Recycle Now campaign to encourage more people to take up home composting.

== Bibliography ==
- Forrester, Philippa (2004). The River. Orion. ISBN 0-7528-5685-5.
- Hamilton James, Charlie; Forrester, Philippa (2010). Halcyon River Diaries. Preface Publishing. ISBN 978-1-84809-225-9.
- Forrester, Philippa (2010). Get Out: Halcyon River Activity Book. Preface Publishing. ISBN 978-1-84809-226-6. (with her sons Gus Hamilton James, Fred Hamilton James, and Arthur Hamilton James)
- Forrester, Philippa (2020). On the Trail of Wolves. Bloomsbury. ISBN 978-147297-204-0.
- Forrester, Philippa (2024). Wild Woman. Bloomsbury. ISBN 978-139940-087-9.
