= World on the Move =

UK radio program

- Genre: Science and nature
- Running time: 28 mins
- Country of origin: United Kingdom
- Language(s): English
- Home station: BBC Radio 4
- Hosted by: Philippa Forrester and Brett Westwood
- Original release: 12 February 2008 – present
- Website: BBC website page

World on the Move is a nature radio series broadcast weekly on BBC Radio 4. It is presented by Philippa Forrester and Brett Westwood. It is about migration in the natural world, and includes features on birds, mammals fish, frogs, toads, and insects. The programs include many reports from scientists in-the-field in various places worldwide. Observations from viewers are incorporated in some of the reports and statistics. The series used new tracking technology to follow animal migrations. The Great Animal Migrations program estimated fuel consumed during geese migration.
