= BirdWatch Ireland =

Voluntary conservation organisation in Ireland

BirdWatch Ireland (BWI) is a voluntary conservation organisation and registered charity devoted to the conservation and protection of wild birds and their habitats in Ireland. It was formerly known as the Irish Wildbird Conservancy (IWC). Irish Wildbird Conservancy was founded in 1968, among others by Major Robert (Robin) Ruttledge, an Irish ornithologist who became its first president.

BWI has over 15,000 active members and supporters, and a network of 30 branches actively promoting the importance of birds and habitats, and general conservation issues. It publishes the annual journal Irish Birds and the quarterly magazine Wings. It manages a number of nature reserves including Little Skellig.

BirdWatch Ireland is a member of the Irish Environmental Network, the Sustainable Water Network (SWAN), Environmental (Ecological) NGOs Core Funding Ltd (EENGO), Working and Educating for Biodiversity (WEB) and the Irish Uplands Forum (IUF). They also work closely with the Irish National Biodiversity Data Centre in providing wildlife monitoring data.

== Controversy ==
The Charities Regulator reported in November 2022 that there had been misuse of funds and inadequate internal controls. This followed revelations that the organisation had misspent restricted funds designated for specific projects on general expenditure including repairs to the chief executive's wife's car.

== Activities and programmes ==
=== BirdTrack ===
BirdTrack is an online citizen science website, operated by the British Trust for Ornithology (BTO) on behalf of a partnership of the BTO, the RSPB, BirdWatch Ireland, the Scottish Ornithologists' Club and the Welsh Ornithological Society.

=== Garden Bird Survey ===
The Garden Bird Survey (GBS) is one of BirdWatch Ireland's most popular volunteer surveys which receives over 1,000 submissions annually when it takes place between December and February.

=== Report on declining Irish bird populations ===
The organization released the Irish Wetland Bird Survey in the 1990s, when there were 1.2 million wintering waterbirds in Ireland. A recent analysis in April 2019 put the number at 760,000.

In July 2019, Birdwatch Ireland reported that the Irish bird population was in "dramatic" decline, with 40 percent of the country's waterbirds, or half a million, lost in the prior 20 years. Loss of habitat was cited as the reason for the decline. Other reasons were climate changes, agriculture, hedge cutting, pollution, and the burning of scrub. Birdwatch Ireland called for Citizens' Assembly to examine the biodiversity loss. One of every five Irish bird species assessed in the survey was threatened with extinction. Lapwing numbers, according to Birdwatch Ireland, were down 67% in twenty years. It also said there had been an "almost complete extermination" of farmland birds, for example the corncrake. The curlew was reported on the verge of extinction in Ireland, with only 150 pairs remaining. In the 1960s, 5,000 pairs had been reported.

=== Reserves Managed by BirdWatch Ireland ===
- East Coast Nature Reserve, Co. Wicklow
- Kilcoole, Co. Wicklow
- Wexford Wildfowl Reserve, Co. Wexford
- Capel Island & Knockadoon Head, Co. Cork
- Cuskinny Marsh, Co. Cork
- Sheskinmore Lough, Co. Donegal
- Rogerstown, Co. Dublin
- Shenick Island, Co. Dublin
- Bullock Island, Co. Offaly
- Bishop's Island, Co. Galway
- Small Wood, Co Galway
- Little Skellig, Co. Kerry
- Puffin Island, Co. Kerry
- Illaunmaistir, Co. Mayo
- Termoncarragh Lake, Co. Mayo
- Termoncarragh Meadows, Co. Mayo
- Annagh Marsh, Co. Mayo
