= Welsh Ornithological Society =

Welsh ornithological body

The Welsh Ornithological Society (Welsh: Cymdeithas Adaryddol Cymru) is an organisation which promotes the study and conservation of birds in Wales. Each year it organises a conference and publishes two issues of the journal Welsh Birds, one of which contains the Welsh Bird Report. It was founded on 26 March 1988 at a conference in Aberystwyth. It now has about 250 members. The television presenter and author Iolo Williams has been the society's president since November 2009.

The society runs the Welsh Records Panel which decides on the authenticity of records of rare birds in Wales. It considers records of species recorded five times or less each year and decisions are published in the report Scarce and rare birds in Wales. The body continues the work of the Welsh Records Advisory Group founded in 1967.

== BirdTrack ==
BirdTrack is an online citizen science website, operated by the British Trust for Ornithology (BTO) on behalf of a partnership of the BTO, the RSPB, BirdWatch Ireland, the Scottish Ornithologists' Club and the Welsh Ornithological Society.
