= Donald Watson (artist) =

Scottish ornithologist and wildlife artist

Donald Watson (28 June 1918 – 7 November 2005) was a Scottish ornithologist and a wildlife artist.

== Early years ==
Watson was born at Cranleigh, Surrey. He drew birds as a child and was encouraged in this by the wildlife artist Archibald Thorburn. The family relocated to Edinburgh, and Donald attended Edinburgh Academy. There he met a former pupil, George Waterston, Director of the Royal Society for the Protection of Birds in Scotland, and President of the Midlothian Ornithologists' Club, which became the Scottish Ornithologists' Club in 1936. Together with his elder brother, Eric (1914-1999), they were among the first members of the newly founded Scottish Ornithologists' Club in 1933, and helped to set up a bird observatory on the Isle of May in the Firth of Forth.

After attending Oxford University and then undergoing war service in India, he was further encouraged by two ornithologists at Tynron, Dumfriesshire, the Rev. J.M. McWilliam, and Sir Arthur Duncan, Chairman of the Nature Conservancy.

== Career ==
Donald Watson specialised in painting birds in their natural environment. He had his first one-man exhibition in Edinburgh in 1949, followed by London, Glasgow, Oxford, Dumfries as well as Toronto and Luxembourg. He illustrated over 30 books, including the Oxford Book of British Birds. He became a founder member of the Society of Wildlife Artists, and President of the Scottish Ornithologists' Club. He also was a local bird recorder for Galloway.

He was not only a painter, but also a gifted author. His first book, written and illustrated by him, was "Birds of Moor and Mountain" (1972), followed by "The Hen Harrier" (1977), "A Bird Artist in Scotland" (1988), and "One Pair of Eyes" (1994).

He and his wife, Joan, settled in St. John's Town of Dalry in a house called Barone.

He died in Dumfries. He and his wife are buried in Dalry Kirkyard. The Donald Watson Gallery, an exhibition space for wildlife artists at Waterston House in Aberlady, East Lothian is named after him.

== See also ==
- List of wildlife artists
