= Dilys Breese =

Welsh ornithologist and television producer

- Born: 2 June 1932; Abergavenny, Monmouthshire, Wale
- Died: 22 August 2007 (aged 75)
- Resting place: Churchyard, West Kington, Wiltshire
- Education: Oswestry Girls' High School; St Andrews
- Occupation: Television producer
- Employer: BBC
- Known for: Wildlife documentaries
- Awards: Golden Jubilee Medal (BTO)

Dilys Breese (born 2 June 1932, Abergavenny, Monmouthshire; died 22 August 2007) was a Welsh ornithologist and television producer of natural history programmes for the BBC. She worked for the British Trust for Ornithology, who commemorate her contribution by awarding the Dilys Breese Medal, funded by her bequest to them.

Breese was brought up in Wales, she was educated at Oswestry Girls' High School, then graduated from St Andrews in 1954, with an MA in English Literature and Language.

== Radio ==
After graduation, she applied for a position as a trainee studio manager with BBC radio. While working on shows like Woman's Hour she developed an interest in natural history, and by 1970 was producing the majority of BBC Bristol's natural history output, with presenter Derek Jones. With Jones, she created the successful radio series The Living World and Wildlife.

== Television ==
In 1970, Breese joined the BBC Natural History Unit, where she produced television shows including The World About Us, Wildlife on One and The Natural World.

She left the BBC in 1991 and set up her own company, Kestrel Productions, making several short programmes until deteriorating health prevented her from working.

== Conservation work ==
Breese became a council member of the British Trust for Ornithology in 1973 and was its Honorary Secretary from 1998 to 2001. She chaired the working group developing 'Garden BirdWatch', which has since become the largest year-round citizen science project in the world. In 1983, she was the first recipient of the BTO's Golden Jubilee Medal for outstanding service to the Trust.

== Notable films ==
- The Great Hedgehog Mystery (1982) - first film to show hedgehogs mating
- In-Flight Movie (1987) - won at the New York International Film and TV Festival; and at the Wildscreen film festival in 1988
- Meerkats United (1987) - voted the best wildlife documentary of all time by BBC viewers
- Trivial Pursuit: the Natural Mystery of Play (1988) - audience of 12 million

== Bibliography ==
- — (1981). Wildlife: questions and answers. BBC. ISBN 0-563-17171-5.
- — (1998). Everything You Wanted to Know About Hedgehogs. Midsummer Books. ISBN 1-900732-00-9.
- — (1998). Everything You Wanted to Know About Owls. Midsummer Books. ISBN 1-900732-05-X.
