= T. & A. D. Poyser =

British publisher

T. & A. D. Poyser began as a British publisher, founded by Trevor and Anna Poyser in 1973, to specialise in ornithology books. It was located in Berkhamsted, Hertfordshire, and later in Calton, Staffordshire.

T. & A. D. Poyser often worked in conjunction with the British Trust for Ornithology, having early success with the Atlas of Breeding Birds in Britain and Ireland (1976).

Trevor and Anna Poyser sold the business to Academic Press in January 1990. This was, in turn, taken over by Harcourt Brace and then Elsevier Science. Academic Press added a new imprint, Poyser Natural History.

In June 2002, the brand and back-list of around 70 titles were acquired by A & C Black (in turn part of Bloomsbury Publishing Plc) from Elsevier Science. Bloomsbury continue to use the T & A D Poyser imprint. The 100th book on the imprint will be The Common Buzzard by Sean Walls and Robert Kenward, publishing in early 2020.

Trevor Poyser died in late August or early September 2017.

== Notable publications ==
- Atlas of Breeding Birds in Britain and Ireland (1976) ISBN 0-85661-018-6
- The EBCC Atlas of European Breeding Birds, (1997) ISBN 0-85661-091-7
