= European Union for Bird Ringing =

European organisation for bird ringing

- Abbreviation: EURING
- Formation: 1963; 63 years ago
- Region served: Europe
- Website: euring.org

The European Union for Bird Ringing (EURING) is the co-ordinating organisation for European bird ringing schemes.

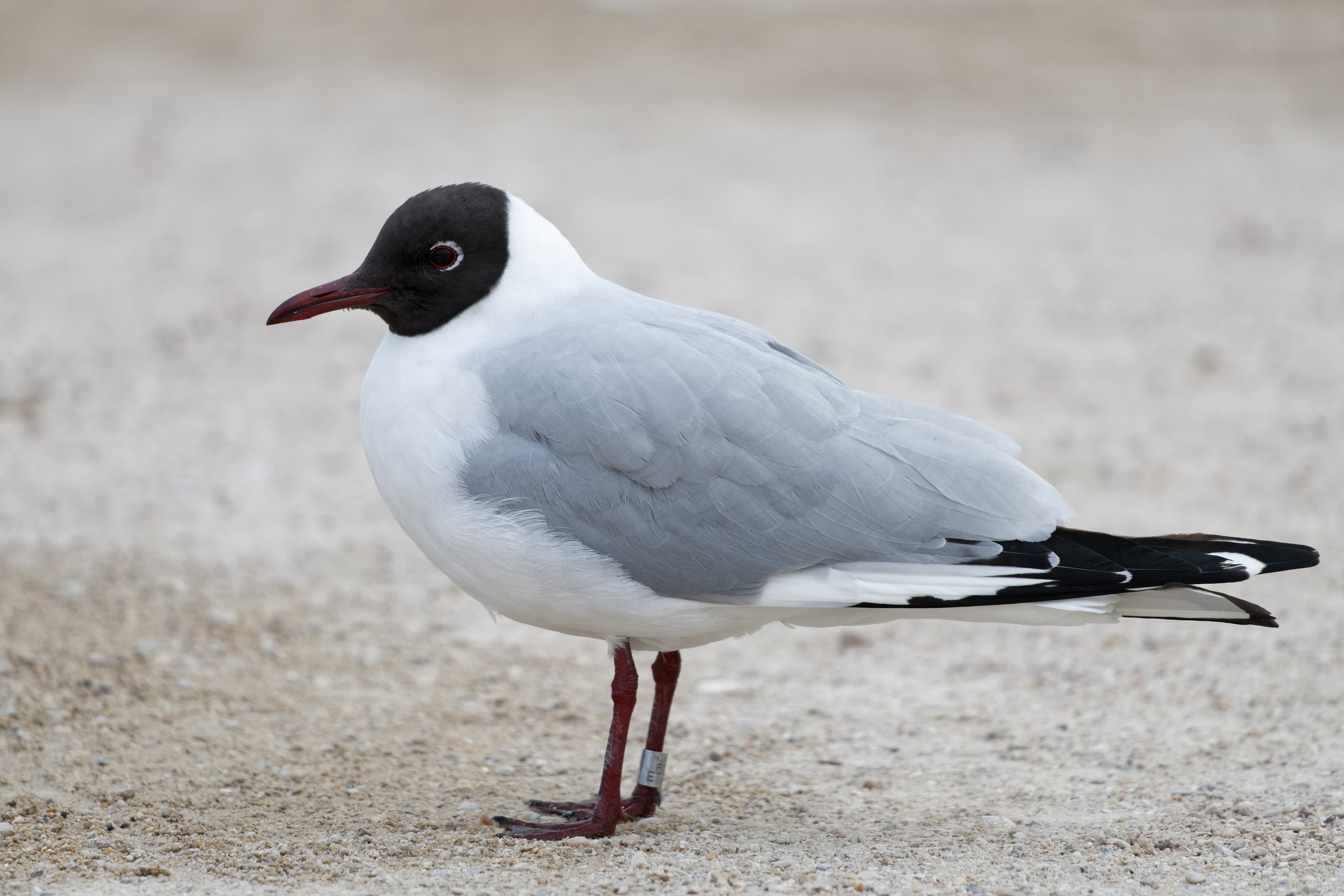
Ringed Black-headed gull Chroicocephalus ridibundus at the Tuileries in Paris on March 1, 2018. The ring number is CZP ET06049, where CZP is the EURING scheme code of the Czech Republic Prague ringing scheme, and ET06049 the unique number assigned by that scheme. The EURING species code for Black-headed gull is 05820.

== History ==
EURING was founded in France in 1963, partly in response to a meeting at the 13th International Ornithological Congress (Ithaca, New York, June 1962).

EURING has established the EURING Exchange Code to enable data interchange between members, and the central EURING Databank to collect records from all members in a central database.

== Exchange Code ==
The EURING Exchange Code (or EURING Code) is a data exchange format that describes bird ringing information and ringing recoveries. Its main use is to enable data exchange between EURING members (that each have their own databases and formats) and between members and the EURING Databank.

The code was established in the 1966 EURING meeting by adapting a Dutch punch card code that originated in 1963. The EURING Exchange Code has since then been developed further as technology improved, resulting in newer editions in 1979 and 2000. The code had moved from punch cards to ASCII code to be used in text files and databases. The 2000 code was modified into the 2000+ version, and later succeeded by the 2020 version, which is the current standard.

EURING codes are also used to identify species in other ornithological research, such as The EBCC Atlas of European Breeding Birds.

== Databank ==
In 1977, EURING founded the EURING Databank (EDB) to collect records from all members in a central location. The EDB was initially hosted at the Netherlands Institute of Ecology. In 2006, the hosting was moved to the British Trust for Ornithology (BTO).

== Relevance ==
The establishment of the EURING 2000 Exchange Code was a driver for the rapid advancement in capture-recapture studies and analyses.

EURING data is used in scientific research on ornithology or related subjects. Research topics include migration routes, wintering areas and staging areas, and survival rates. Bird ringing data such as in the EDB is also relevant for conservation.

Other applications include usage for detecting avian influenza patterns, as seen in the EFSA Migration Mapping Tool and Bird Flu Radar.

The EDB data is combined with Movebank data to form the publicly available Eurasian African Bird Migration Atlas, developed by the Convention on the Conservation of Migratory Species of Wild Animals under the United Nations Environment Programme.
