= Hilborough =

Village in Norfolk, England

Coordinates: 52.57184°N 0.69596°E

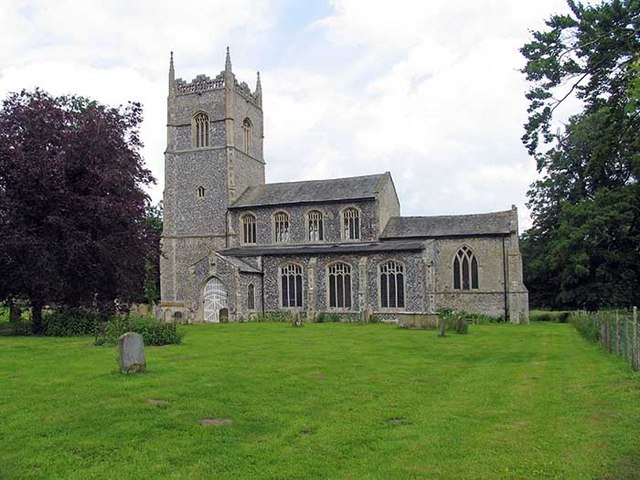
- All Saints Church

- Location within Norfolk
- Area: 22.64 sq mi (58.6 km^{2})
- Population: 219 (2021 census)
  - Density: 10/sq mi (3.9/km^{2})
- OS grid reference: TF8200
  - London: 93.2 miles (150.0 km)
- Civil parish: Hilborough
- District: Breckland
- Shire county: Norfolk
- Region: East
- Country: England
- Sovereign state: United Kingdom
- Post town: THETFORD
- Postcode district: IP26
- Dialling code: 01760
- Police: Norfolk
- Fire: Norfolk
- Ambulance: East of England
- UK Parliament: South West Norfolk

Hilborough is a village and a civil parish in the English county of Norfolk. The parish of Hilborough also includes Bodney.

Hilborough is located 5.5 miles (8.9 km) south of Swaffham and 25.4 miles (40.9 km) west-southwest of Norwich, along the A1065 road.

== History ==
Hilborough's name is of Anglo-Saxon origin and derives from the Old English for Hildeburh's enclosure.

In the Domesday Book, Hilborough is listed as a settlement of 38 households in the hundred of South Greenhoe. In 1086, the village was part of the East Anglian estates of William de Warenne.

The ancestors of Admiral Nelson, including the Admiral's father, the Reverend Edmund Nelson, who left for Burnham Thorpe shortly before Horatio was born, were rectors of the parish church of All Saints at Hilborough between 1734 and 1806.

In the Nineteenth Century, Old Bodney Hall was demolished and soon replaced with another hall built by Robert Adam. The residence was at one point the residence of Arthur Wellesley, 2nd Duke of Wellington.

During the Second World War, there were plans to build an airfield for RAF Bomber Command on Hollow Heath yet this was abandoned due to the objections of local landowners. Instead, the area became a decoy airfield which was bombed at least once.

In 1986 a portion of the Hilborough Estate originally commissioned by Ralf Cauldwell in 1779, was bought by Hugh van Cutsem, who built a neo-Palladian mansion designed by architect Francis Johnson. The efforts of the van Cutsem family and their estate workers resulted in the Hilborough Estate becoming one of the country's leading wild-bird shoots, winning awards for their conservation work.

== Geography ==
According to the 2021 census, Hilborough has a population of 219 people which shows a decrease from the 243 people recorded in the 2011 census.

The A1065, between Mildenhall and Fakenham, passes through the village.

== All Saints' Church ==
Hilborough's parish church is located just off the A1065 and dates from the Fifteenth Century. All Saints' has been Grade I listed since 1960 and is no longer open for Sunday service.

All Saints' features a hammerbeam roof dating from the Fifteenth Century and features a set of royal arms dating from the reign of King James I.

== Notable residents ==
The family of Admiral Nelson. Nelson's grandfather, father, uncle-by-marriage and his brother were all rectors of All Saints parish church in the village. As a young boy Nelson stayed with his uncle and grandmother in Hilborough. After the battle of the Nile, Nelson was created Baron Nelson of the Nile and Hilborough.

=== Other notables ===
- George Caldwell- (1807-1863) MCC cricketer, born in Hilborough.
- Sophia Cooke- (1814-1895) missionary and schoolmistress in Singapore, born in Hilborough.
- Sir R. A. Young CBE- (1871-1959) physician, born in Hilborough.
- Chris Mead- (1940-2003) ornithologist, author & broadcaster, link to Hilborough unknown.
- Hugh van Cutsem- (1941-2013) banker, businessman & landowner, owner of Hilborough Hall.
- Fiona Richmond- (b.1945) glamour model and actress, born in Hilborough.
- Harriet Mead- (b.1969) wildlife sculptor, lives in Hilborough.

== Governance ==
Hilborough is part of the electoral ward of Ashill for local elections and is part of the district of Breckland.

The village's national constituency is South West Norfolk which has been represented by Labour's Terry Jermy MP since 2024.

== War Memorial ==
Hilborough War Memorial is a small wheel cross monument in All Saints' Churchyard. The memorial lists the following names for the First World War:

Rank	Name	Unit	Date of death	Burial/Commemoration
LCpl.	Herbert J. Hoggett	7th Bn., Norfolk Regiment	28 Apr. 1917	Arras Memorial
Dvr.	Fred Hubbard	224th Coy., Army Service Corps	13 Jul. 1915	All Saints' Churchyard
Pte.	George Hubbard	6th Bn., Durham Light Infantry	8 Apr. 1918	Denain Cemetery
Pte.	Ernest E. Bilverstone	4th Bn., Middlesex Regiment	12 Oct. 1918	Vis-en-Artois Memorial
Pte.	Harry Stevenson	2nd Bn., Norfolk Regiment	16 Apr. 1916	Basra Memorial
Pte.	Maurice Stevenson	8th Bn., Norfolk Regt.	19 Jul. 1916	Thiepval Memorial
Pte.	Arthur C. Buckle	1st Bn., Northamptonshire Regiment	9 May 1915	Le Touret Memorial
Pte.	Charles W. Baker	Queen's Royal Regiment	18 Dec. 1918	Norwich Cemetery
Pte.	Frederick W. Howard	12th Bn., Suffolk Regiment	25 Sep. 1916	Arras Memorial

The following names were added after the Second World War:

Rank	Name	Unit	Date of death	Burial/Commemoration
FO	Bert W. Golden	No. 35 Squadron RAF (Lancaster)	21 Feb. 1945	Reichswald Forest Cem.
Sgt.	Leonard C. Gaskins	No. 75 Squadron RAF (Lancaster)	4 Nov. 1943	Runnymede Memorial
LBdr.	Arthur C. Wing	191 Regt., Royal Artillery	21 Jul. 1944	Ranville War Cemetery
LS	Arthur E. Grummitt	HMS Pandora (Submarine)	1 Apr. 1942	Chatham Naval Memorial
Pte.	Reginald R. Harvey	6th Bn., Royal Norfolk Regiment	27 Jan. 1942	Kranji War Memorial
