= Bodney =

Former civil parish in Norfolk, England

Coordinates: 52.554°N 0.700°E

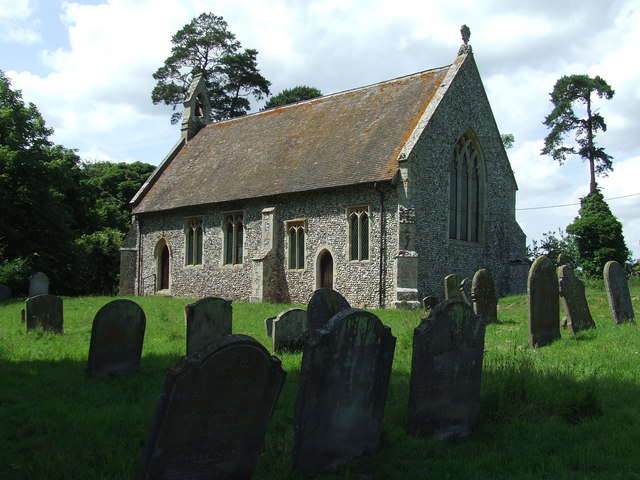
- St Mary's church

- Location within Norfolk
- OS grid reference: TL8398
- Civil parish: Hilborough
- District: Breckland
- Shire county: Norfolk
- Region: East
- Country: England
- Sovereign state: United Kingdom
- Post town: Thetford
- Postcode district: IP26
- Dialling code: 01760
- Police: Norfolk
- Fire: Norfolk
- Ambulance: East of England
- UK Parliament: South West Norfolk

Bodney is a former civil parish, now in the parish of Hilborough, in the Breckland District of the English county of Norfolk. It is 10 miles (16 km) north of Thetford and 26 miles (42 km) west of Norwich. In 1931 the parish had a population of 70. The village has virtually disappeared with only a few houses remaining.

Parts of the parish lie within the Stanford Training Area, a military training area operated by the Ministry of Defence since 1942. On the edge of the training area Bodney Camp serves as a military camp, including for members of the Household Cavalry during their summer trip to Norfolk. Old Bodney Camp, a Site of Special Scientific Interest, is within the area of the former parish, near to the site of Bodney Camp.

== History ==
Bodney's name is of Anglo-Saxon origin. In the Domesday Book, it is listed as a settlement of 19 households in the hundred of Greenhoe and was part of the estates of William of Warenne, Ralph of Tosny and Hugh de Montfort.

During the medieval period Bodney Warren, a rabbit warren owned by Thetford Priory, dominated the parish. During the late medieval period the village declined dramatically in size and was considered "small" by 1524. It is thought possible that large flocks of sheep owned by Thetford Priory may have replaced the village inhabitants, forcing the village to shrink significantly in size. Bodney Hall, a 16th-century hall, was probably built on the site of a medieval manor house. It was demolished during the 19th-century. Some earthworks remain. On 1 April 1935 the parish was merged with Hilborough.

During the Second World War, warplanes operated from RAF Bodney. From 1940 to 1943, the airfield was used by the Bristol Blenheims of No. 21 and No. 82 Squadron and, subsequently, from 1943 to 1945 by the 149th, 486th and 487th Fighter Squadrons of the United States Army Air Forces. The Stanford Training Area was established in 1942.

== Church ==
Bodney's parish church is dedicated to Saint Mary. The building dates from the 12th-century. The church was significantly remodelled in the 19th-century, but a font survives within from the 15th century. The building is Grade II listed. An area of foundations close to the current church is believed to be the site of an earlier building, possibly a church.

== Governance ==
Bodney is part of the electoral ward of Ashill for local elections and is part of the district of Breckland. It is part of the South West Norfolk parliamentary constituency.
