= Emma Louisa Turner =

English ornithologist and photographer (1867–1940)

Emma Louisa Turner FLS, FZS, HMBOU
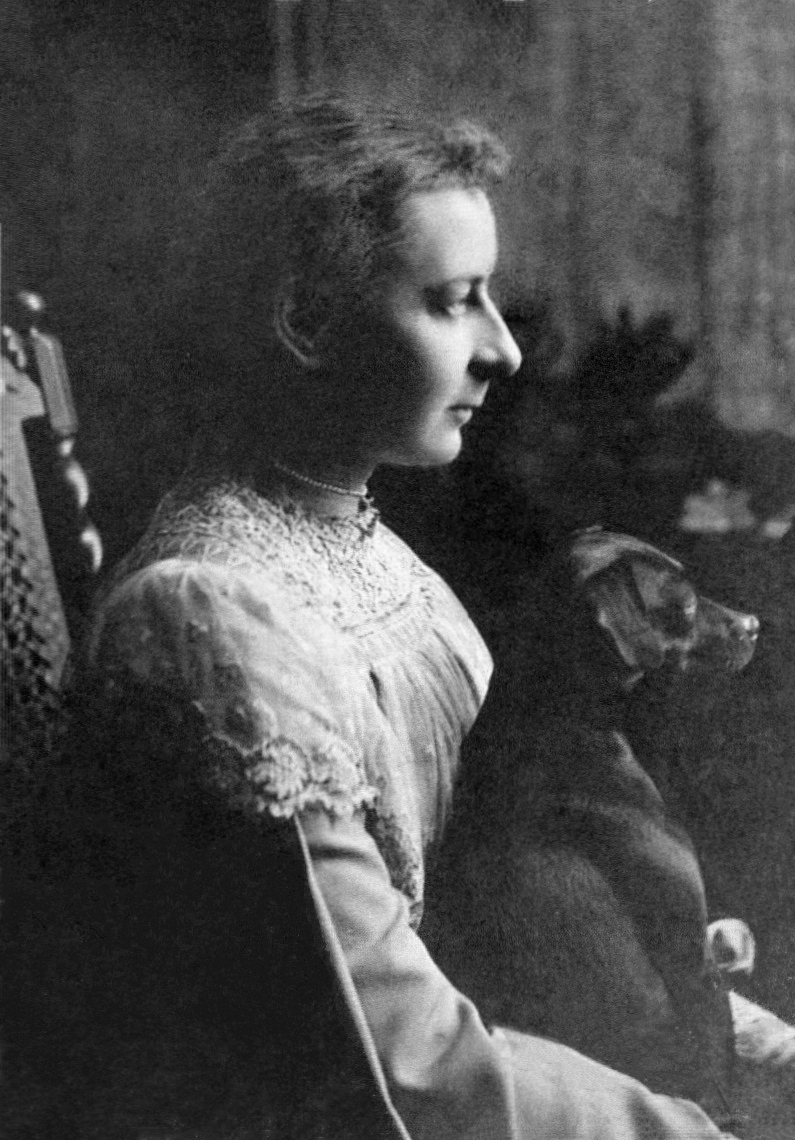
- Turner in the 1890s
- Born: 9 June 1867; Langton Green, Tunbridge Wells, Kent, England
- Died: 13 August 1940 (aged 73); Cambridge, Cambridgeshire, England
- Known for: Bird photography

Emma Louisa Turner or E L Turner FLS, FZS, HMBOU (9 June 1867 – 13 August 1940) was an English ornithologist and pioneering bird photographer. Turner took up photography at age 34, after meeting the wildlife photographer Richard Kearton. She joined the Royal Photographic Society (RPS) in 1901, and by 1904 she had started to give talks illustrated with her own photographic slides; by 1908, when aged 41, she was established as a professional lecturer.

Turner spent part of each year in Norfolk, and her 1911 image of a nestling bittern in Norfolk was the first evidence of the species' return to the United Kingdom as a breeding bird after its local extinction in the late 19th century. She also travelled widely in the United Kingdom and abroad photographing birds.

Turner wrote eight books and many journal and magazine articles, and her picture of a great crested grebe led to her being awarded the Gold Medal of the RPS. She was one of the first women to be elected to fellowship of the Linnaean Society and the first female honorary member of the British Ornithologists' Union. Though not a graduate, she was also an honorary member of the British Federation of University Women. She lost her sight two years before her death.

== Early life ==
Emma Louisa Turner was born on 9 June 1867 in Langton Green, Royal Tunbridge Wells, Kent, to John and Emma (née Overy) Turner. She was their fourth and last child, following a sister, Mary, and brothers John and Frank. Her father was a grocer and draper with three shop staff. The family was affluent enough to employ a governess and a servant, and to send Emma to a boarding school.

Turner's mother died in 1880, when she was aged 13, and with the death of her elder sister Mary in 1891, Turner's life appears to have been mainly family-based, even after she started her photographic career. This continued at least until the death of her father, aged 83, in 1913. She may also have helped look after her brother Frank's children between the death of his first wife, Annie, in 1895, and his remarriage some five years later.

== Hickling Broad ==
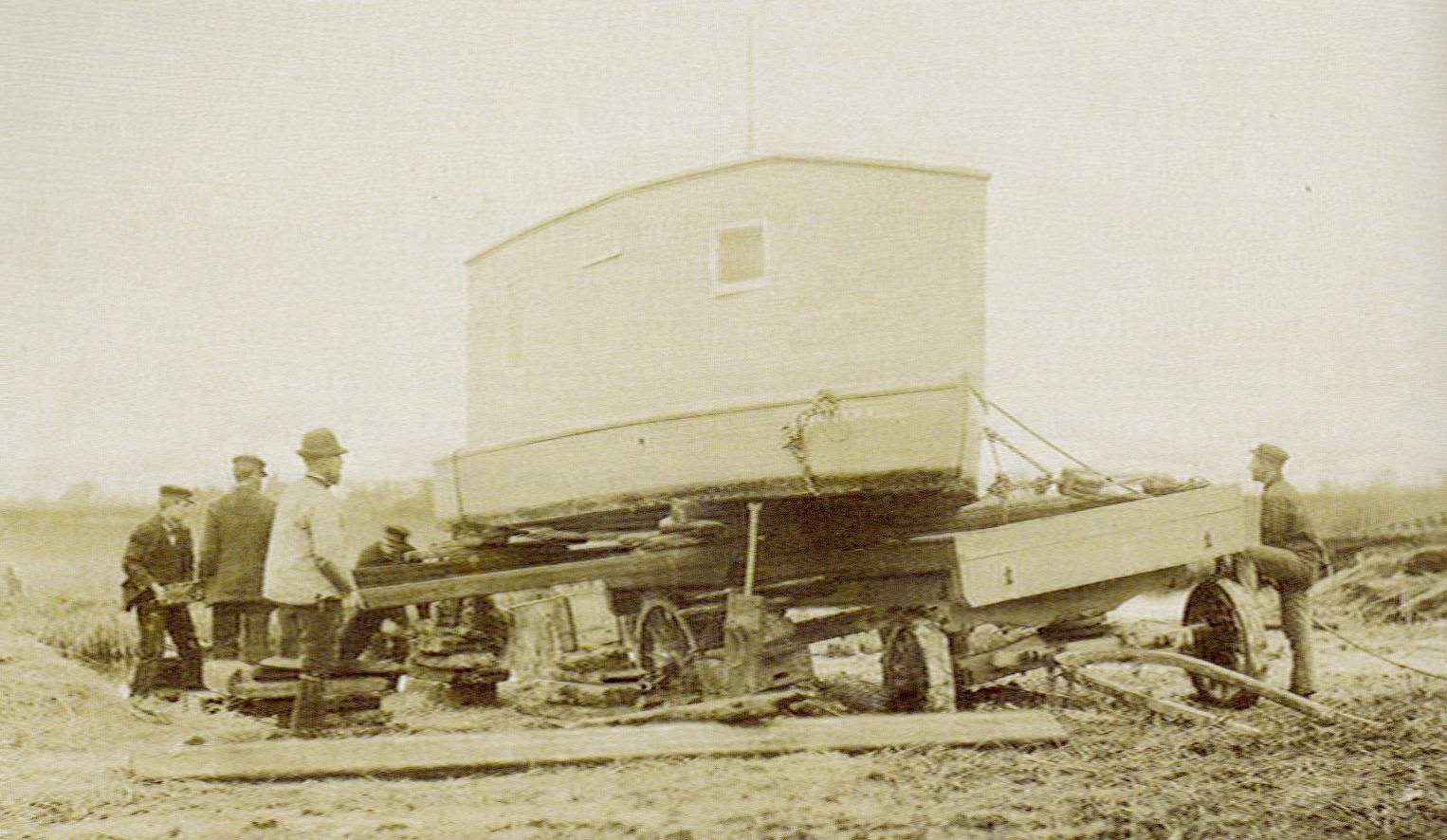
Turner's houseboat in transit, March 1905

Turner took up photography after meeting pioneering wildlife photographer Richard Kearton in 1900, joining the Royal Photographic Society in 1901, and by 1904 she had started to give public lectures illustrated with lantern slides of her own photographs. By 1908 she was established as a professional lecturer, producing her own publicity material, and in the 1911 census she gave her occupation as "lecturer in ornithology". She typically photographed from close to her subject using dry-plate camera equipment. (Note: Only two of her cameras have been recorded; a quarter-plate Birdland Reflex, and a made-to-order half-plate model. The Birdland camera sold at the time for £20 17s, equivalent to about £2000 at 2020 prices.)

She first visited the Norfolk Broads in 1901 or 1902. Her early contacts included the gamekeeper Alfred Nudd, who would punt her to photographic locations, and his relative Cubit Nudd, who became her general helper on site. Another gamekeeper and professional wildfowler, Jim Vincent, used his extensive knowledge of the area to find birds and nests. Turner's friend, the Reverend Maurice Bird, probably introduced to her by Richard Kearton, kept a natural history diary for 50 years and was therefore also able to share information with her.

For a quarter of a century, Turner lived and worked for part of each year, including two winters, at Hickling Broad in Norfolk. She stayed mainly on a houseboat of her own design, which she named after the water rail (Rallus aquaticus), the first bird that she photographed in the Norfolk Broads. The flat-bottomed boat was transported to Hickling on a trolley, and launched in March 1905. She also owned a hut on a small island in the south-east of Hickling Broad, which became known as "Turner's Island". The hut was used as a photographic darkroom and a spare bedroom when visitors stayed. (Note: Turner's Island coordinates 52.735206°N 1.586171°E)

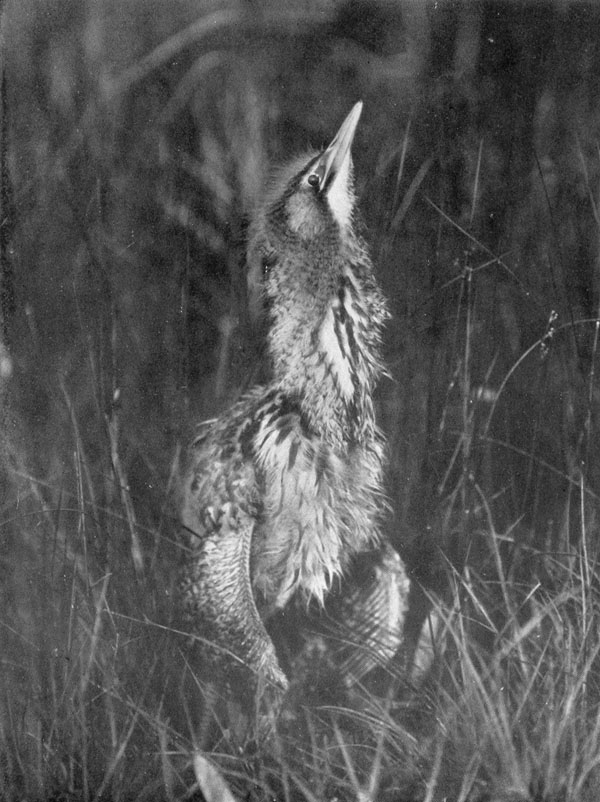
"Striking upwards", Turner's 1911 photograph of a young bittern, the first record of the species breeding in the UK since 1886

A highlight of her career, in 1911, was finding with Jim Vincent, and photographing, a nestling bittern (Botaurus stellaris), a species that had not been recorded as breeding in the UK since 1886. Her nest photographs included those of the rare Montagu's harrier (Circus pygargus) and the first known breeding ruffs (Calidris pugnax) in Norfolk since 1890. Unusually for the time, the Whiteslea Estate, which owned much of the broad, and for which Vincent worked from 1909 to 1944, actively protected its birds of prey. Although both Montagu's and the then even rarer marsh harrier (Circus aeruginosus) bred there at the time, neither was mentioned in her book Broadland Birds. (Note: This was presumably at the request of the estate, which was leased by a syndicate including cabinet ministers Edwin Montagu and Sir Edward Grey. Edwin Montagu had no connection to the bird of prey that shares his name, which was described by the naturalist George Montagu.)

Emma Turner was a pioneer of bird ringing in the UK, being allocated the first-ever small-size rings (numbers 1–10) issued by Harry Witherby's British Bird Marking scheme in 1909. She also participated in a short-lived Country Life ringing project. In practice, she seems to have done little, if any, ringing after the first year.

She seems to have been generally fit, and was described as being "quite capable with a punt or rowing boat", (Note: The quote is from Edwin Vincent, son of Jim Vincent, Edwin Montagu's gamekeeper.) but she suffered bouts of illness throughout her life, with a notable attack in the summer of 1907. The cause of her illness is unknown, although tuberculosis has been suggested. She kept dogs, particularly Manchester Terriers, which she trained to flush birds so that she could count them.

== Travels to 1923 ==
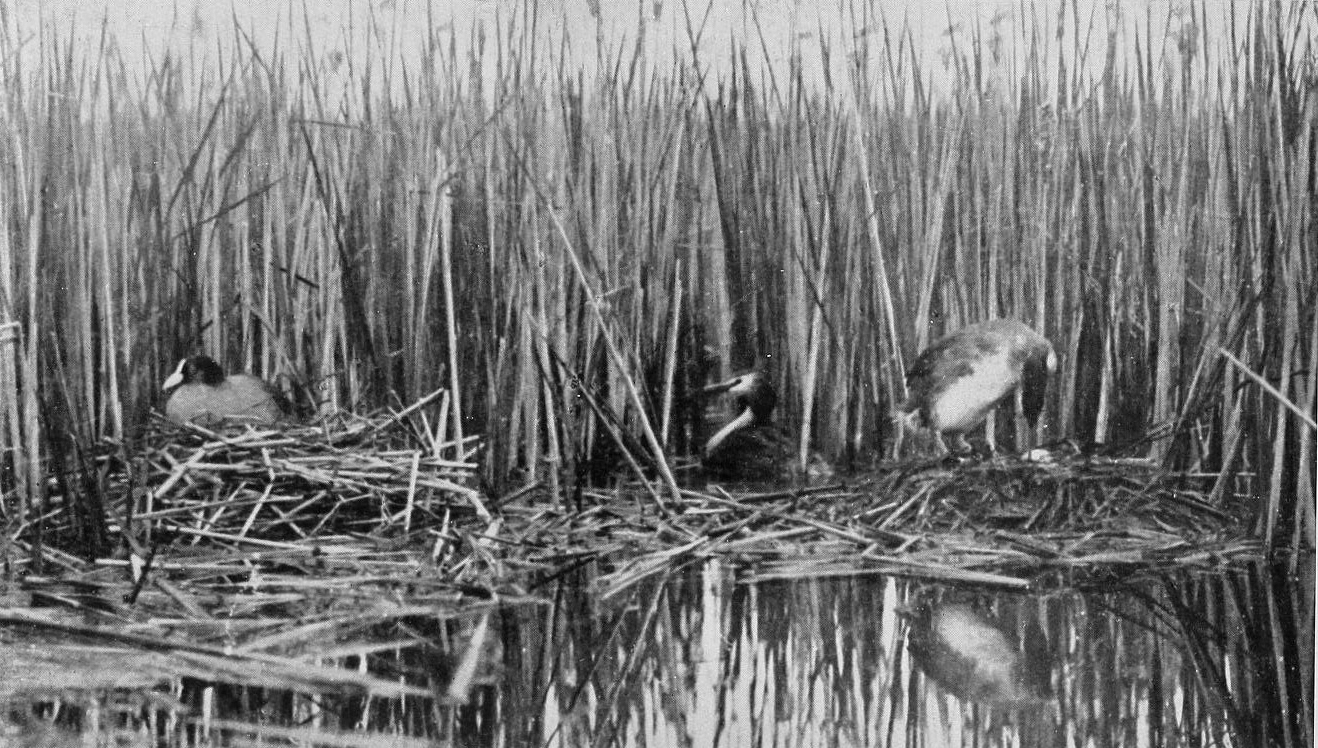
Nesting coots and great crested grebes from Broadland Birds, the image that won her the RPS Gold Medal

Although Turner spent part of the year in Norfolk every year from 1901 to 1935, she also travelled widely elsewhere. From the family home in Langton Green, she would drive her horse and trap to sites in Kent and Sussex, but she also journeyed much further afield, including several weeks on remote North Uist in 1913, where she saw breeding red-necked phalaropes (Phalaropus lobatus), divers and Arctic skuas (Stercorarius parasiticus). The following year she was a guest of Mary Russell, Duchess of Bedford at her house in Meikleour, Perthshire. The duchess was also a keen ornithologist, and the two women had known each other for several years. When the duchess sailed to Fair Isle on the ferry The Sapphire, she dropped Turner off at Stromness, Orkney on the way. On Orkney, Turner attempted to photograph breeding seabirds, took a day trip to Hoy, and through a chance encounter found herself a guest at Balfour Castle on Shapinsay. Her host, Colonel David Balfour, sailed her back to Orkney to get the ferry to Inverness, from where she went to Aviemore to search for crested tits (Lophophanes cristatus).

She went to Lindisfarne Castle on Holy Island in the autumn as a guest of Edward Hudson, owner of Country Life magazine, and stayed there for the 1914–15 winter right through to May. The island is a bird migration hotspot, and rarities she saw there included a great grey shrike (Lanius excubitor) and a White's thrush (Zoothera aurea). She also made several boat trips to the Farne Islands, 9.7 kilometres (6.0 mi) away.

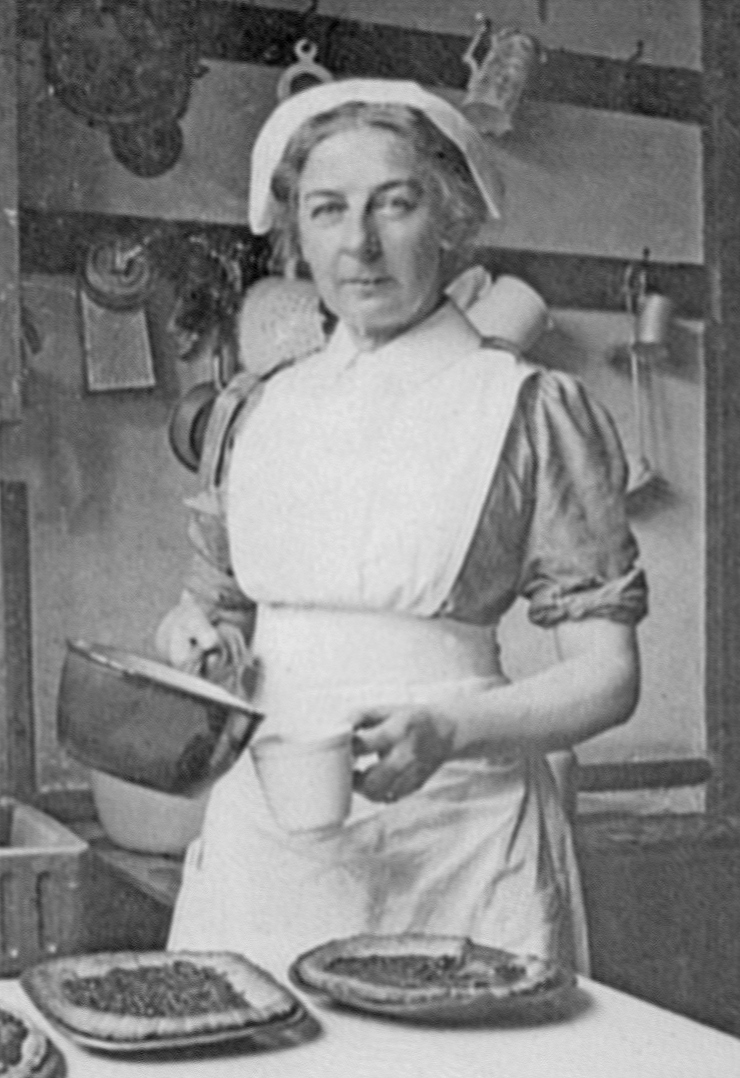
As a VAD cook during the First World War

Probably in early 1913, Turner bought a house in Girton near Cambridge, her permanent home for the next decade. Her journals for 1916 and early 1917 are missing, but it appears that from the middle of the First World War, she was working as a part-time Voluntary Aid Detachment (VAD) cook at an auxiliary military hospital at Cranbrook, not far from Langton Green.

Turner's first trip abroad came in early summer 1920, when she went to Texel island in the Netherlands. She explored the island by bicycle, her main target species being those that no longer bred regularly in the UK, including the black tern (Chlidonias niger), ruff, black-tailed godwit (Limosa limosa) and avocet (Recurvirostra avosetta). She was particularly struck by the large numbers of singing nightingales (Luscinia megarhynchos). A trip to Italy in late 1922 in which she visited its major cultural centres seemed largely committed to art and architecture, a rare ornithological comment in her journal being a sighting of a blue rock thrush (Monticola solitarius).

== Scolt Head ==
The National Trust had purchased Scolt Head Island in Norfolk in 1923 for its terns and other breeding birds, but was concerned about the damage done to the nesting colonies by egg-collectors, and, inadvertently, by visitors walking around the 490 hectares (1,200 acres) island. By this time, Turner was established as a photographer, bird expert and author. The Norfolk and Norwich Naturalists' Society (NNNS) proposed to appoint a "watcher" (warden) to supervise the reserve, and when Turner was told they were struggling to find someone suitable, she volunteered herself, thus becoming the first resident "watcher" for the island.

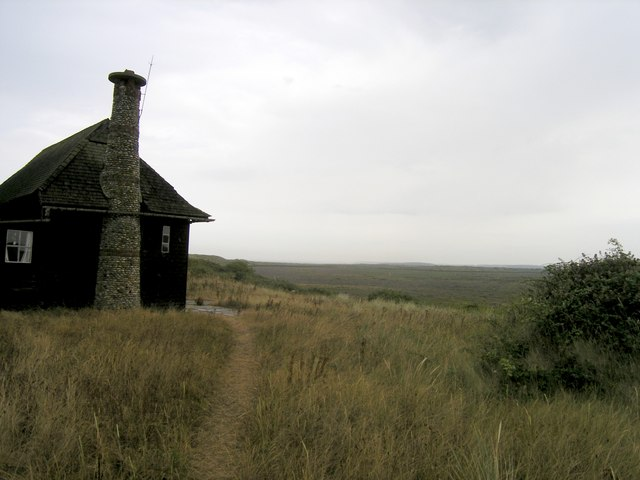
The hut on Scolt Head in 2006

Aged 57, Turner found herself living on the reserve in a basic hut during the breeding season, with no electricity supply, and significantly dependent on rain for fresh water. Once protected, the birds prospered, the number of breeding pairs of common terns (Sterna hirundo) and Sandwich terns (Thalasseus sandvicensis) rising from 17 to 800 and from 59 to 640 respectively by 1925, her final year. As well as studying the breeding seabirds, she was able to monitor migrating birds, and found a rare black stork (Ciconia nigra). She wrote a book, Birdwatching on Scolt Head, about her experiences on the island. She was frequently described by the press as the loneliest woman in England, but she pointed out that she never felt lonely, and often had visitors.

== After 1925 ==
Soon after her stay on Scolt Island, Turner moved from Girton to Cambridge proper, and continued to indulge in her passion for gardening in her new suburban home. She was active in the Cambridge Ornithological Club, now the Cambridge Bird Club, becoming a vice-president and committee member. She went to Scotland in 1926, although she seemed by then to be less active as a photographer, perhaps concentrating on her writing. Two years later, she was off to Cornwall to see choughs (Pyrrhocorax pyrrhocorax), where only a few pairs still remained in that county. (Note: The last successful breeding in Cornwall was in 1947, and the last two birds were dead by 1973. Natural recolonisation commenced in 2001.)

In 1929 she travelled to Amsterdam as a member of the International Ornithological Congress, which organised excursions to Texel, Naarden Lake and Zwanenwater. Around 1933 she went on a Mediterranean cruise with Chief Constable of the Isle of Man, Lieutenant colonel Henry William Madoc and his wife. They saw more than 150 species, including 52 that were new to Turner. After this trip, her journals become sporadic and incomplete, and she seems not to have travelled abroad again.

== Recognition ==
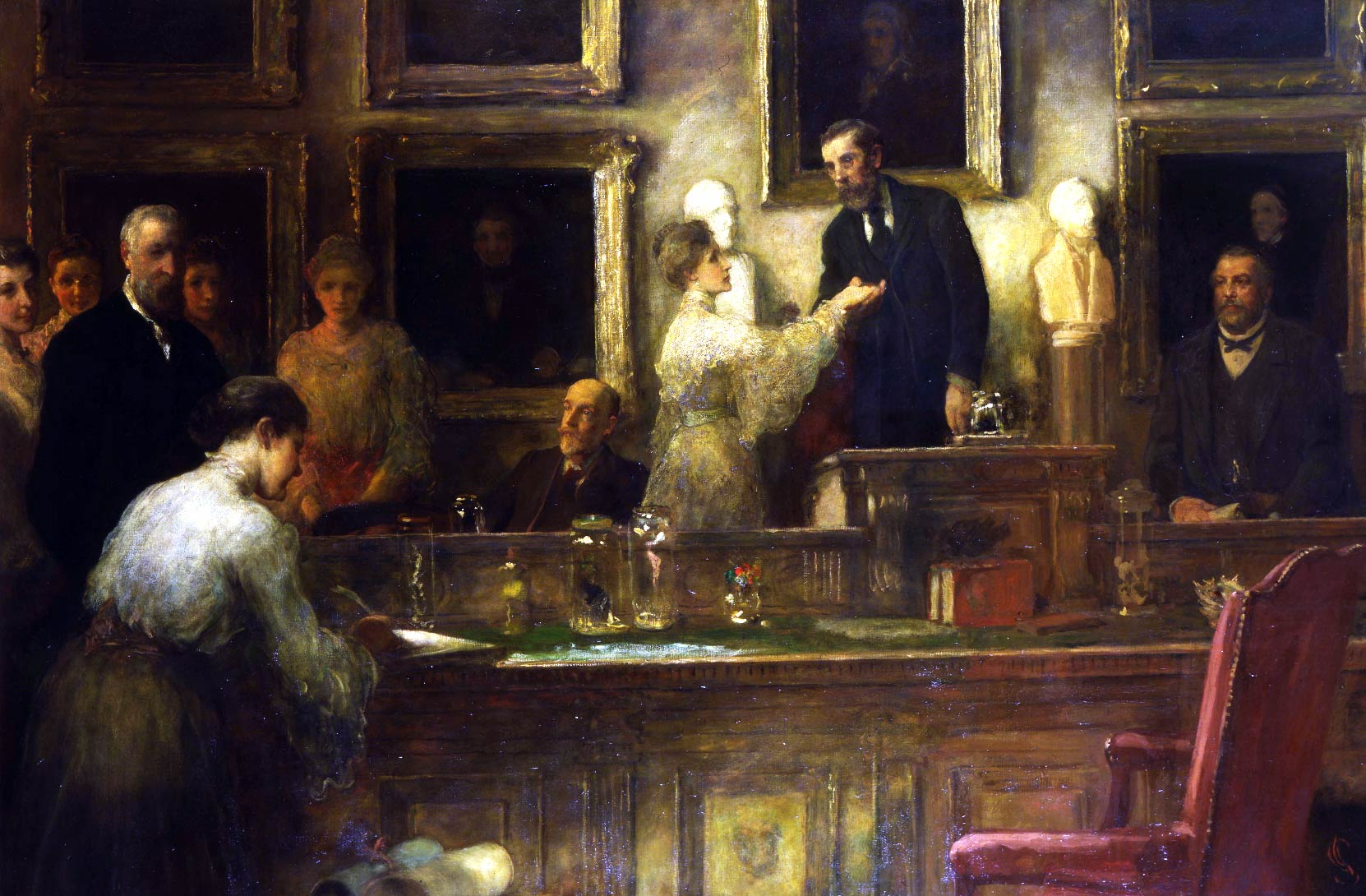
James Sant's 1906 painting of the admission of women to the Linnean Society of London in 1904. Turner is at the extreme left.

Turner was awarded the 1905 Gold Medal of the Royal Photographic Society for her photograph of a great crested grebe. Jim Vincent also received a gold medal for his part in obtaining her bittern picture, in his case from the Royal Society for the Protection of Birds (RSPB).

She was elected as one of the first 15 female fellows of the Linnean Society in December 1904. Then aged 38, she was one of the younger women admitted.

Emma Turner was one of the first four female honorary members of the British Ornithologists' Union (BOU) admitted in 1909, (Note: The others were the Duchess of Bedford, Dorothea Bate and Margretta Lemon. L J Rintoul and E. V. Baxter joined them in 1911.) and was the only woman, along with 10 men, (Note: The letter was signed: Desborough; Hugh S. Gladstone; Grey of Fallodon; Julian S. Huxley (Chancellor of Oxford University); T. G. Longstaff; Percy R. Lowe; P. Chalmers Mitchell; Rothschild; Scone M.P. (Chairman, British Trust for Ornithology); E. L. Turner; H. F. Witherby (President, British Ornithologists' Union)) involved in the 1933 appeal that led to the foundation of the British Trust for Ornithology (BTO), an organisation for the study of birds in the British Isles. Her involvement in the BTO appeal was unusual enough that it led to The Daily Telegraph of 7 July 1933 inadvertently listing her as Mr E L Turner. She was President of the Norfolk and Norwich Naturalists' Society from 1921 to 1922.

She was a vice-president of the RSPB, although she later fell out with the organisation following what she considered an unfair and dismissive review of her 1935 book, Every Garden a Bird Sanctuary. The reviewer, in the RSPB's 1935 winter issue of Bird Notes and News had said it "showed signs of haste and extraneous matter gathered in to fill vacancies ...". She was made an honorary member of the British Federation of University Women, despite not being a graduate.

== Last years ==
Turner lost her sight two years before her death on 13 August 1940, and an operation to remove her cataracts was unsuccessful. The failed surgery and the advent of colour photography, which she believed would lead to her life's work being forgotten, meant that her last years were not happy.

In her will, she requested that she be cremated. She left her photographic materials to the BTO, and her book copyrights and £50 were bequeathed to her nephew, Geoffrey Cater Turner. Her boats, furniture and most other personal possessions were left to her niece, Enid Mary Fowler. The residue of her estate was to be disposed of by both of them. She also posthumously cancelled the £900 her brother Frank owed her. Her estate was valued at probate at £3031.

== Legacy ==
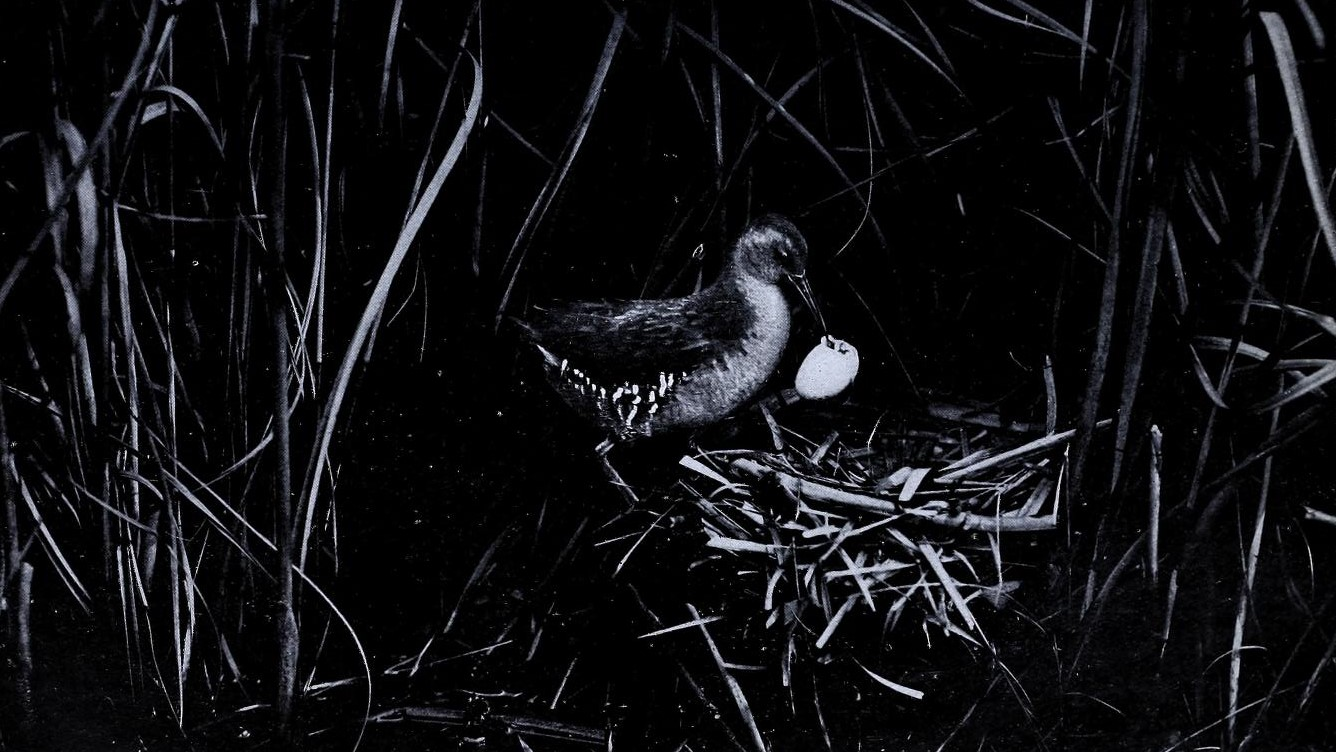
Water rail from Broadland Birds (Note: In the introduction to Masterpieces of Bird Photography (1947) its editors Eric Hosking and Harold Lowes lament that Turner's picture of a water rail could not be included as "Try as we would it was impossible to locate prints or negatives" of that and certain others' "notable pictures".)

Turner was a pioneer in her photographic work in terms of her preparation, achievements and aesthetics, and earned praise from professional photographers such as William Plane Pycraft, who wrote of Turner and a Mr H B Macpherson as:

...combining exceptional powers of observation and the skilful use of the camera. This combination in so high a degree of perfection is rare, and it demands yet a third element to achieve success, that is, endurance under extremely trying conditions.

She was also respected for her writing, which attracted plaudits from national newspapers including The Daily Telegraph, the Manchester Guardian and The Observer. The Observer, reviewing Bird Watching on Scolt Head commended the book for the author's knowledge and commitment, and said of the quality of the writing "It is as good as anything in the Voyage of the Beagle". Her book, Broadland Birds, published in 1924 formed the basis of a radio programme about her life, Emma Turner; a life in the reeds, broadcast by the BBC in 2012, produced by Sarah Blunt and with sound recordings by Chris Watson.

== Publications ==
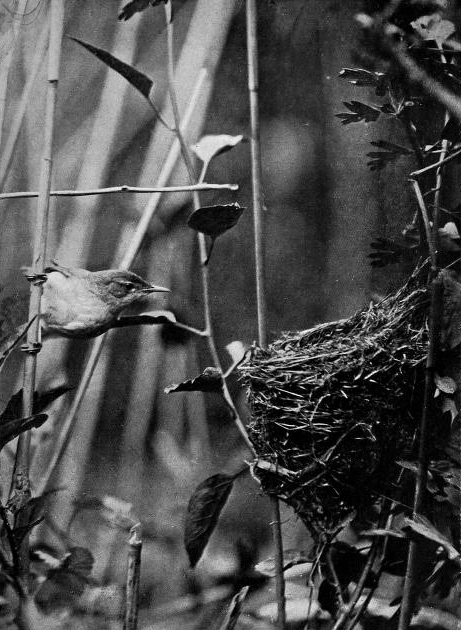
A reed warbler and its nest from Turner's Broadland Birds

Turner produced hundreds, if not thousands, of photographs in her life, many of which appeared in her numerous publications. Most of her original plates were donated to the RSPB, or bequeathed to the BTO, but apart from her bittern images, virtually all appeared to be lost from 1940 until 2020, when hundreds of plates and slides were found in a cardboard box at BTO headquarters in Thetford.

She wrote eight books, and was also a major contributor or chapter editor to at least six other multi-editor publications, (Note: Her biographers list five, but have omitted the technical text Photo-engraving in Relief.) writing eight of the 48 accounts in The British Bird Book and eight sections of Country Life's Wildlife of the British Isles in Pictures. (Note: Kirkman, F B (1910–1913). The British Bird Book. London: T C & E C Jack., to which she also contributed photographs, and Pitt, F, ed. (1936–1954). The Romance of nature: Wildlife of the British Isles in Pictures. London: Country Life. This was initially published in parts.) From at least 1911 to 1915 she was working on an account of the birds of Norfolk, but it was never published, probably because she chose not to include records from the Whiteslea estate, and no manuscript has since been found. Emma Turner wrote more than 30 articles for British Birds, one of which was a 1919 review of the breeding biology of the bittern illustrated with her own nest photographs. She contributed to other journals, most frequently the Transactions of the Norfolk and Norwich Naturalists' Society.

She was a regular contributor to Country Life, for which she wrote more than 60 articles, and she also contributed frequently to other local and national publications including four articles in The Times on Norfolk wildlife. Her photographs were often published in the RPS's The Photographic Journal, (Note: Her biographers appear to have overlooked her contributions to this journal and its exhibitions. For example, volume 46 p. 231 (1906) lists images of coot, great crested grebes, red-backed shrikes and long-tailed tits, and volume 49 p. 277 (1909) has sparrowhawk and wheatear) and in 1917 she co-authored a technical article on the half-tone process in the same publication.

In addition to her professional writing, Emma Turner kept pocket diaries and daily journals. These, along with press cuttings and photographs, were donated to the BTO in 2011, although her handwriting is so illegible as to require specialist assessment. (Note: The material was donated by her great-niece, Joan Keeling, and her half-cousin Julia Volrath.)

=== Books ===
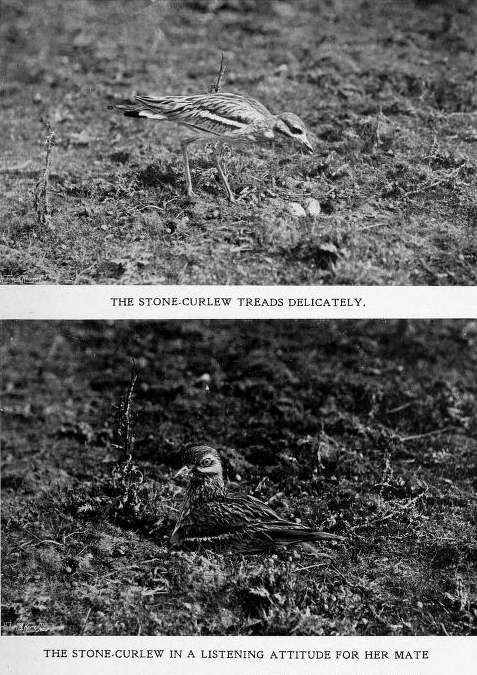
Stone curlews from Broadland Birds

- with Bahr, P H (1907). The Home Life of Some Marsh Birds. London: H. F. & G. Witherby. (Note: Phillip Henry Bahr, later Manson-Bahr was a zoologist, physician and BOU member who contributed chapters on the red-throated diver, black-headed gull and common snipe.)
- Broadland Birds. London: Country Life. 1924.
- with Gurney, Robert (1925). A Book about Birds. London: C Arthur Pearson. (Note: Robert Gurney was a Hickling landowner, zoologist and Turner's friend.)
- Birdwatching on Scolt Head. London: Country Life. 1928.
- Stray Leaves from Nature's Notebook. London: Country Life. 1929.
- Togo, My Squirrel. London: J W Arrowsmith. 1932.
- My Swans the Wylly-Wyllys. London: J W Arrowsmith. 1932.
- Every Garden a Bird Sanctuary. London: H.F. & G. Witherby. 1935.
- with Smith, William Joseph; Hallam, C D (1937). Photo-engraving in Relief: A Textbook Intended for the Use of Apprentices and Others Interested in the Technique of Photo-engraving (first ed.). London: Pitman.

=== Selected articles ===
Some of the better-known of her many articles include:

- "A nesting Reeve in Norfolk" . Country Life. 22 (17 August): 231–233. 1907 – via Wikisource.
- "The return of the Bittern". Transactions of the Norfolk and Norwich Naturalists' Society. 9 (3): 433–436. 1912.
- "The bittern in the Norfolk Broads: 'A great entail'". British Birds. 13 (1): 5–12. June 1919.
- "Notes on the breeding of the Bittern in Norfolk". Transactions of the Norfolk and Norwich Naturalists' Society. 10 (4): 319–334. 1919.
- "Presidential address: The Status of Birds in Broadland". Transactions of the Norfolk and Norwich Naturalists' Society. 11 (3): 227–240. 1922.

== See also ==
- Timeline of women in science
