= Hugh Steuart Gladstone =

Scottish ornithologist and landowner (1877-1949)

Sir Hugh Steuart Gladstone of Capenoch FRSE FSA FZS MBOU DL LL (1877–1949) was a Scottish ornithologist and landowner. He served as Lord Lieutenant of Dumfries 1946 to 1949.

== Life ==
Gladstone was born on 30 April 1877 the son of Samuel Steuart Gladstone of Capenoch and his wife Sophia Musgrave. He lived his life at Capenoch House in Penpont in Dumfriesshire, a major country house designed by David Bryce. He was sent to Eton College and then studied at Cambridge University graduating MA.

He was on 10 February 1897 appointed a second lieutenant in the 3rd (Militia) battalion of the King's Own Scottish Borderers, and promoted to lieutenant on 4 April 1900. The Second Boer War started in late 1899, and Gladstone was in 1900 commissioned for active service with the regiment in South Africa, winning two campaign medals and five clasps.

On return to Britain he served as a County Councillor 1904 to 1946. He served numerous senior roles in the Dumfries Council. In 1909 he was elected a Fellow of the Royal Society of Edinburgh. His proposers were James Cossar Ewart, Henry Harvey Littlejohn, James Geikie and Cargill Gilston Knott.

In the First World War he rejoined the KOSB as a captain and was Mentioned in Dispatches. He later moved to the General Staff in the War Office in London serving administrative functions.

In 1920 he became Chairman of the Wild Birds Advisory (Scotland) Committee, serving this role until death.

In 1933 he was one of eleven people (Note: The letter was signed: Desborough; Hugh S. Gladstone; Grey of Fallodon; Julian S. Huxley (Chancellor of Oxford University); T. G Longstaff; Percy R. Lowe; P. Chalmers Mitchell; Rothschild; Scone M.P. (Chairman, British Trust for Ornithology); E. L. Turner; H. F. Witherby (President, British Ornithologists' Union)) involved in the appeal that led to the foundation of the British Trust for Ornithology (BTO), an organisation for the study of birds in the British Isles.

He was knighted in 1941.

He died at Capenoch House on 5 April 1949.

== Publications ==
- Birds of Dumfriesshire (1910)

== Family ==
He married Cecil Emily Chetwynd-Talbot in January 1907. They had one daughter, Jean Cecil Gladstone (who married Roderick Barclay), and two sons, John Gladstone of Capenoch (his heir) and David Steaurt Gladstone (an architect).

== Artistic recognition ==
His portrait by Herbert James Gunn is held by Dumfries Museum.

== Notes ==
Honorary titles
| Preceded by Francis John Carruthers | Lord Lieutenant of Dumfries; 1946–1949 | Succeeded by Sir John Crabbe |
