= Irish Birds =

- Discipline: Ornithology
- Language: English
- Edited by: Barry McMahon

Publication details
- History: 1977 to present
- Publisher: BirdWatch Ireland (Republic of Ireland)
- Frequency: Annual

Standard abbreviations
- ISO 4: Ir. Birds

Indexing
- ISSN: 0332-0111

Links
- Journal homepage

Irish Birds is the annual journal of BirdWatch Ireland. Its first issue was published in 1977, superseding the Irish Bird Report, which had been published from 1953 (number 1) to 1975 (number 23). Irish Birds publishes papers and notes on all aspects of birds in Ireland, as well as incorporating the annual Irish Bird Report and Irish Ringing Report.

The founding editor of Irish Birds was Clive Hutchinson (1977-1984). Subsequent editors have been Hugh Brazier (1985-1996), Brendan Kavanagh (1997-2000), Stephen Newton (2001-2008), Pat Smiddy (2009-2017) and Barry McMahon (2018-present).

== See also ==
- List of ornithology journals
- List of birds of Ireland
