= Leonora Jeffrey Rintoul =

Scottish ornithologist and author

Leonora Jeffrey Rintoul FRSE (1878-1953) was a Scottish ornithologist and rare female member of the Royal Society of Edinburgh. In authorship she is known as L. J. Rintoul and is closely associated with her "constant partner" and co-author E. V. Baxter.

== Life ==
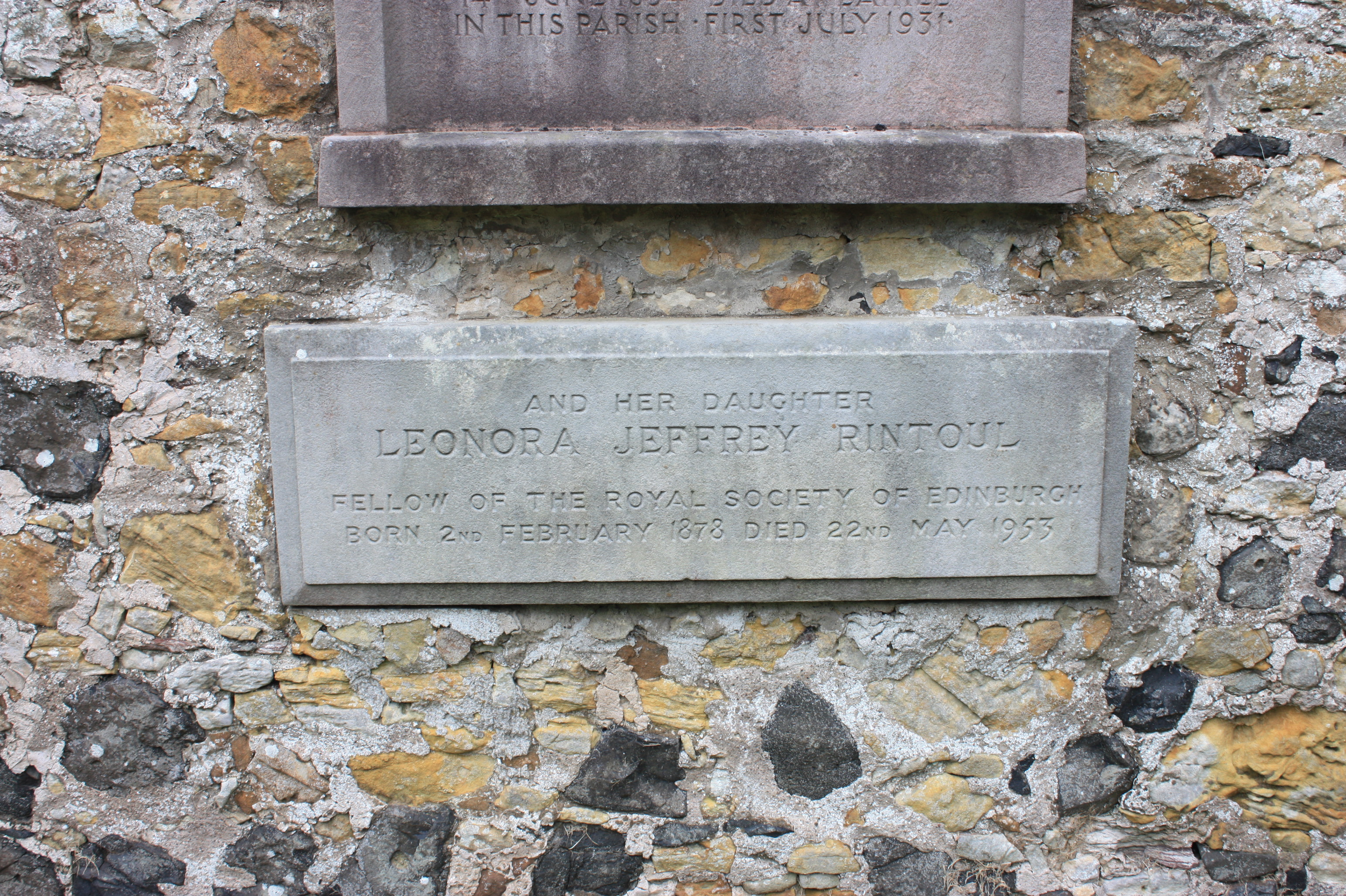
The grave of Leonora J. Rintoul, Old Nowburn Churchyard, Fife

She was born on 2 February 1878 at Lahill in Largo, Fife. She was the daughter of Major Robert Rintoul and his wife Margaret Jeffrey, daughter of John Jeffrey of Balsusney House in Kirkcaldy. Her grandfather, who died before she was born, was the botanist, John Jeffrey.

Rintoul lived in Largo all her life, owning a house next door to Baxter.

With Baxter she was a strong supporter of the Women's Rural Institute in Scotland. In the Second World War she helped to organise the Women's Land Army in Fife.

In 1910, Rintoul and Baxter took over editorship of the annual "Report on Scottish Ornithology", for The Annals of Scottish Natural History.

In 1911, Rintoul and Baxter were elected "Honorary Lady Members" of the British Ornithologists' Union. Together with Baxter, in 1936 she founded and served as Joint President of the Scottish Ornithologists Club.

In 1951 Rintoul was elected a Fellow of the Royal Society of Edinburgh. Her proposers were James Ritchie, Alexander Peacock, John Berry and Sir Maurice Yonge. She and Baxter, who was also elected that year, were the first non-graduates to be elected as Fellows.

Rintoul died at Balsusney in Upper Largo on 22 May 1953 and is buried with her parents within the abandoned church at Newburn, Fife, a popular spot for romantically sited burials.

== Legacy ==
Her collection of birds is held by the National Museum of Scotland. The bird skins donated included the "first records of some species in the Firth of Forth, as well as the first Pied Wheatear found in Britain and the first Common Nightingale and Melodious Warbler in Scotland". She also donated an unusual collection of Scottish basketry to the Museum.

== Publications ==
All these works were co-written with E. V. Baxter

- The Birds of the Isle of May (1918)
- Some Breeding Scottish Duck (1922)
- The Geographical Distribution and Status of Birds in Scotland (1928)
- Birds of Scotland (1953)
