= European Bird Census Council =

Ornithological organisation

- Abbreviation: EBCC
- Formation: 1992; 34 years ago
- Merger of: European Ornithological Atlas Committee; International Bird Census Committee
- Type: NGO
- Legal status: Non-profit organisation
- Purpose: Management and conservation of European bird populations
- Location: Beek, Netherlands
- Region served: Europe
- Website: ebcc.info

The European Bird Census Council (EBCC) is an ornithological organisation which studies the population, distribution and demographics of European birds in order to inform conservation and management efforts. The organisation is headquartered in the Netherlands, and has active members in over 40 countries.

== Founding ==
The EBCC was founded in 1992, following the merger of two ornithological organisations, the European Ornithological Atlas Committee and the International Bird Census Committee.

== Monitoring ==
The EBCC is responsible for the Pan-European Common Bird Monitoring Scheme (PECBMS), which aims to collect data from national bird monitoring schemes across Europe so as to study the forces behind population changes and use common bird indicators as a proxy for environmental health, and thus inform policy.

Monitoring data is published as the European Breeding Birds Atlas, the second of which (EBBA2) is currently in preparation. The data collected as part of the PECBMS and EBBA2 programmes is also distributed on the EBCC-run portal, EuroBirdPortal, as well as through the Global Biodiversity Information Facility (GBIF).

== Activities ==
The EBCC run a conference every three years, devoted to ornithological monitoring, conservation and research in Europe and abroad. The organisation also publishes the Journal of the European Bird Census Council, entitled Bird Census News, which has been running since 1987.

== See also ==
- Bird rarities committee
- Environmental monitoring
