= Nature (radio programme) =

Nature is a long-running documentary programme on BBC Radio 4, covering wildlife and environmental matters.

It is broadcast (and available on-line) on Mondays at 21:00-21:30 and repeated on Tuesdays at 11:00 (local time). Past episodes are also available, in RealAudio, from the programme's web page.

Current presenters include Grant Sonnex and Brett Westwood; former presenters include Mark Carwardine. Nature is also broadcast visually on PBS.
