= The EBCC Atlas of European Breeding Birds =

Ornithological atlas

The EBCC Atlas of European Breeding Birds - their distribution and abundance
- Author: Various
- Illustrator: Various
- Cover artist: David Nurney
- Language: English and 13 others in part
- Subject: ornithology
- Publisher: T & A D Poyser
- Publication date: 1997
- Publication place: England
- Media type: Hardback
- Pages: 903
- ISBN: 978-0-85661-091-2
- OCLC: 37790240
- Dewey Decimal: 598.094 21
- LC Class: QL690.A1 E33 1997

The EBCC Atlas of European Breeding Birds - Their Distribution and Abundance (ISBN 0-85661-091-7) is an ornithological atlas published for the European Bird Census Council by T & A D Poyser in 1997. Its editors were Ward J. M. Hagemeijer and Michael J. Blair. The atlas was the first to present grid-square distribution maps for all breeding birds at a Europe-wide level. The bulk of the book is in English, although it also contains introductions in thirteen other European languages. The atlas presents the results of the European Bird Census Council's European Ornithological Atlas project, the fieldwork for which was carried out between 1985 and 1988.

== The book ==
The book has cxli + 903 pages. Its Foreword (by Karel H Voous) and Preface (by Goetz Rheinwald and Jeremy Greenwood) are followed by an English introduction and shorter introductions in Czech, German, Spanish, French, Finnish, Greek, Hungarian, Italian, Dutch, Portuguese, Polish, Russian and Swedish; indexes of bird names, in the same languages, are also included, at the end of the book. The introductions are followed by sections detailing the history of the European Ornithological Atlas project and the Evolution and History of the European Bird Fauna, and a section listing national and major regional published bird atlases.

The bulk of the book (772 pages) consists of species accounts. All birds with established breeding populations within Europe are covered in a single-page or two-page account which includes a map of breeding distribution, histograms showing those countries with the largest breeding populations, and a species text. Seventeen further species for which some breeding behaviour has been observed within the region are covered more briefly. Some species distributions are shown on maps of the whole survey area, but for those with more restricted distributions, base maps showing only a relevant subdivision are shown.

The book concludes with sections on the Conservation Status of Europe's Birds, a list of species with threat statuses, a set of derived maps depicting overall species richness and richness of threatened species, and a 65-page references section.

The book's dustjacket is illustrated by bird artist David Nurney - the front cover shows a common kingfisher (with a map of its distribution), while a European bee-eater is depicted on the spine.

== The European Ornithological Atlas project ==
The European Ornithological Atlas project was initiated in 1971. Its fieldwork took the form of surveys during the breeding season, in each of the countries within the region, between 1985 and 1988.

The survey area covered by the project extends to include Madeira, The Azores, Iceland, Svalbard, Novaya Zemlya, Franz Josef Land and Transcaucasia, as well as European Russia east to the Urals. However, Turkey, Cyprus, Greenland and the Canary Islands are excluded.

== The EOA maps online ==
The maps from the atlas are available online at the SOVON website here: The EBCC Atlas of European Breeding Birds

== A climatic atlas of European breeding birds ==
In 2007, a follow-up publication, "A Climatic Atlas of European Breeding Birds" was published by Lynx Edicions. This publication consisted of maps of projected species distributions based on the predictions of the Hadley centre HadCM3 climate change model.

== See also ==
- Australian Bird Count (ABC)
- BioBlitz ("24-hour inventory")
- Christmas Bird Count (CBC) (in the Western Hemisphere)
- Seabird Colony Register (SCR)
- Tucson Bird Count (TBC) (in Arizona in the US)
