= Scottish Ornithologists' Club =

Scottish ornithological body

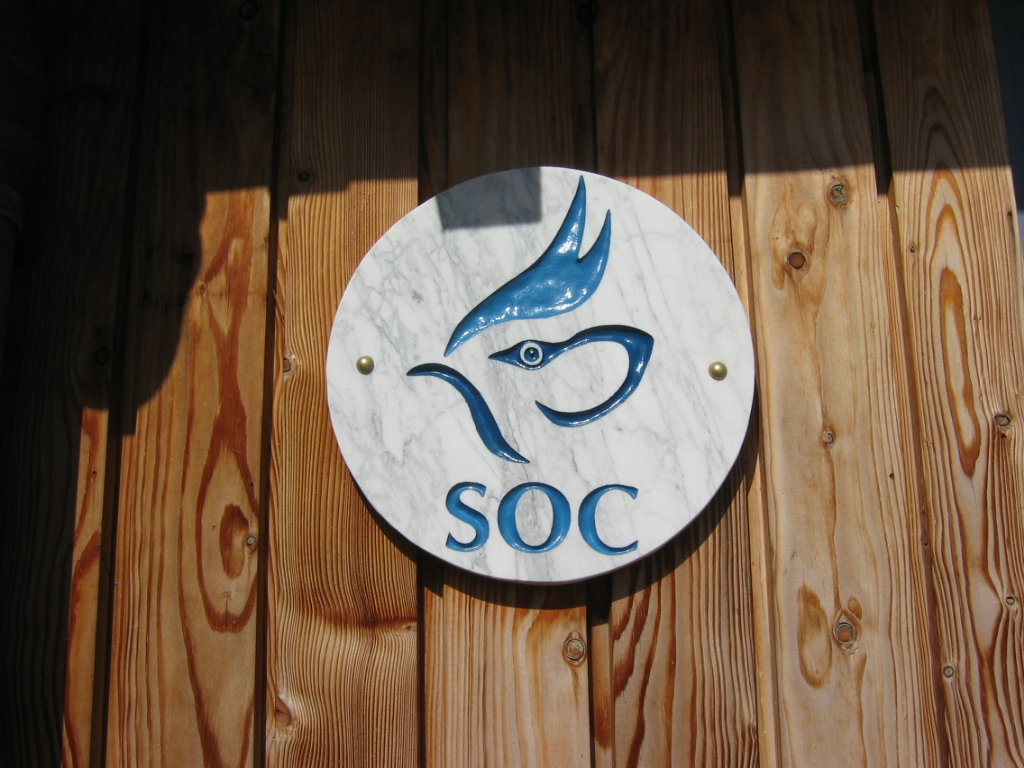
Logo of the Scottish Ornithologists' Club

The Scottish Ornithologists' Club (SOC) is a Scottish ornithological body, founded in March 1936 at the premises of the Royal Scottish Geographical Society. As of 2008, the SOC has 2,200 members. The Club runs the Scottish Birds Records Committee, which maintains a list of birds recorded in Scotland. In 2007, the club was awarded the Silver Medal by the Zoological Society of London. The SOC publishes a quarterly journal entitled Scottish Birds.

== Waterston House ==
The SOC has its headquarters at Waterston House in Aberlady, East Lothian. The building overlooks Aberlady Bay and the Aberlady Local Nature Reserve, the first LNR in the United Kingdom. The building is named after George Waterston (1911–1980), an ornithologist and conservationist who was Director of the Royal Society for the Protection of Birds (RSPB) in Scotland. It is said to house the most comprehensive ornithological library in Scotland, with over 3,500 volumes.

Waterston House's art gallery space is named after Donald Watson (1918–2005), a wildlife artist, who was President of the SOC.

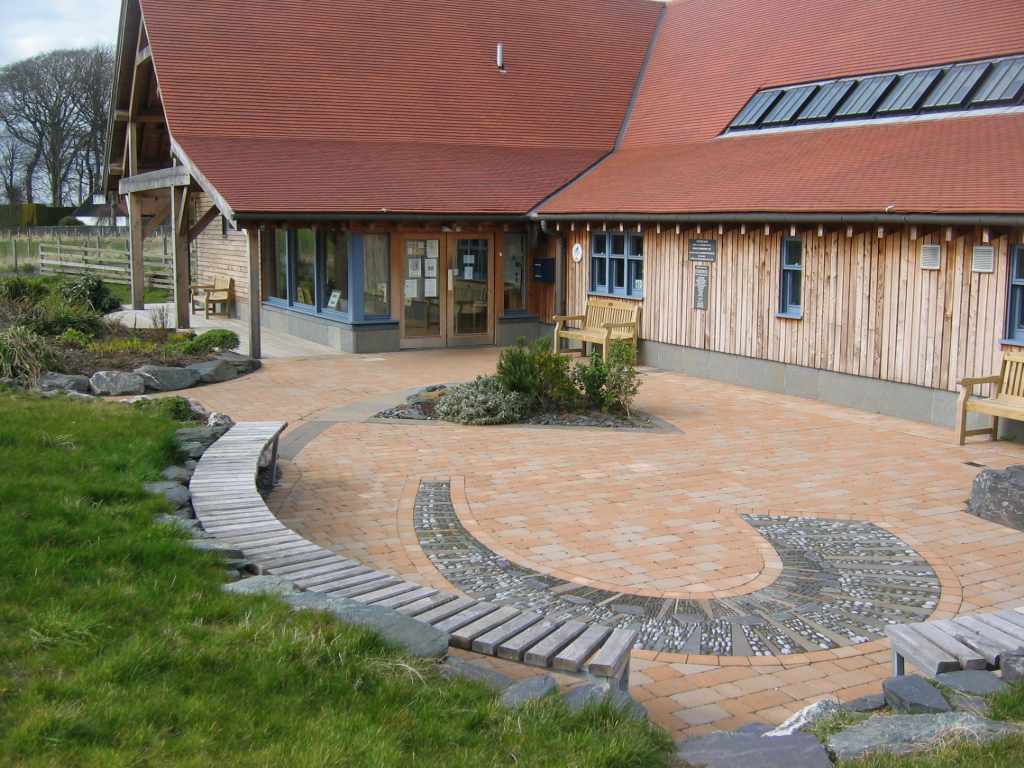
Waterston House

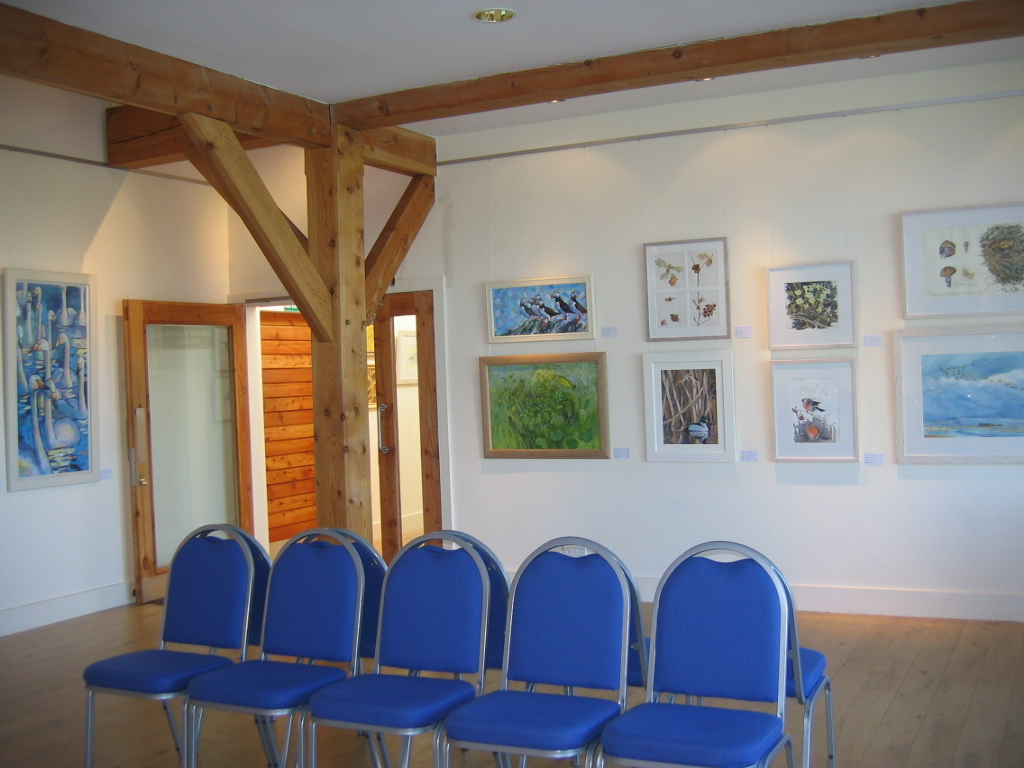
Interior of Waterston House

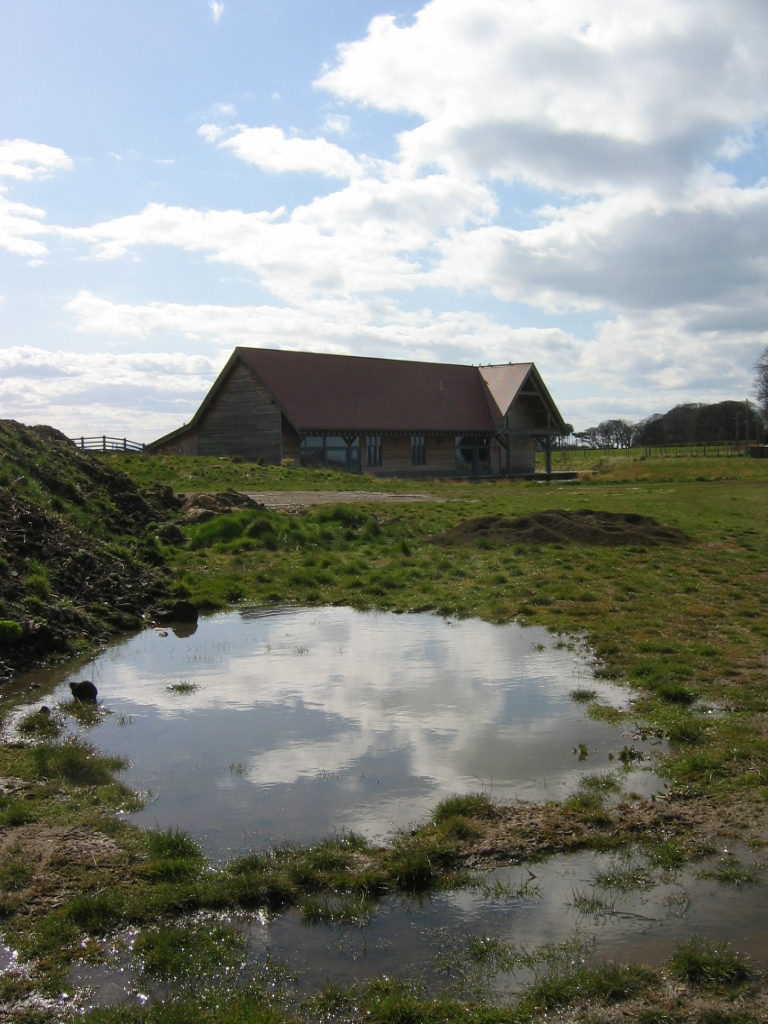
Waterston House

== BirdTrack ==
BirdTrack is an online citizen science website, operated by the British Trust for Ornithology (BTO) on behalf of a partnership of the BTO, the RSPB, BirdWatch Ireland, SOC, and the Welsh Ornithological Society.
