= British Trust for Ornithology =

British research organisation

- Abbreviation: BTO
- Formation: 1932; 94 years ago
- Legal status: Non-profit company
- Purpose: Ornithology in the UK
- Headquarters: The Nunnery, Thetford, Norfolk, IP24 2PU
- Region served: UK
- Website: www.bto.org

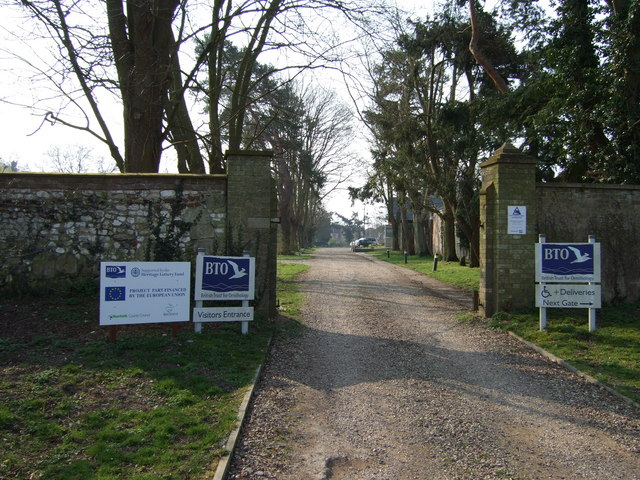
Entrance to Thetford Nunnery, base of the BTO

The British Trust for Ornithology (BTO) is an organisation founded in 1932 for the study of birds in the British Isles. William, Prince of Wales has been patron since October 2020.

== History ==
=== Beginning ===
In 1931 Max Nicholson wrote:

In the United States, Hungary, Holland and elsewhere a clearing-house for research is provided by the state: in this country such a solution would be uncongenial, and we must look for some alternative centre of national scope not imposed from above but built up from below. An experiment on these lines has been undertaken at Oxford since the founding of the Oxford Bird Census in 1927 [...]. The scheme now has a full-time director, Mr W.B.Alexander. [...] It is intended to put this undertaking on a permanent footing and to build it up as a clearing-house for bird-watching results in this country.

This led to a meeting at the British Museum (Natural History) in February 1932, which in turn led to the foundation of an organisation to develop the Oxford scheme. The name British Trust for Ornithology was used from May 1933 and an appeal for funds was published in The Times on 1 July. (Note: The eleven signatories were: Desborough; Hugh S. Gladstone; Grey of Fallodon; Julian S. Huxley (Chancellor of Oxford University); T. G. Longstaff; Percy R. Lowe; P. Chalmers Mitchell; Rothschild; Scone M.P. (Chair, British Trust for Ornithology); E. L. Turner; H. F. Witherby (President, British Ornithologists' Union)) Max Nicholson was the first treasurer, Bernard Tucker the secretary. Harry Witherby was an early benefactor and vice-chair.

Much has been discovered about birds by watching and counting them, but such methods rarely allow birds to be identified as individuals. This is essential to learn about how long they live and when and where they move, questions that are vital for bird conservation. Bird ringing (placing a lightweight, uniquely numbered, metal ring around a bird's leg) provides a reliable method of identifying birds as individuals.

Each ring also has an address so that anyone finding a ringed bird can help by reporting where and when it was found and what happened to it. Some ringing projects also use colour rings to allow individual birds to be identified without being caught.

Birds have been ringed in Britain and Ireland for nearly a hundred years and it still reveals new facts about migration routes and wintering areas. The primary focus of the BTO's ringing schemes is now the monitoring of bird populations, to provide information on how many young birds leave the nest and survive to become adults, as well as how many adults survive the stresses of breeding, migration and severe weather. Changes in survival rates and other aspects of birds' biology can indicate the causes of population changes.

The BTO runs two specialized projects to collect this information. The Constant Effort Sites (CES) scheme provides information on population size, breeding success and survival of bird species living in scrub and wetland habitats. Ringers work at over 130 CES scheme sites each year. The Retrapping Adults for Survival (RAS) project gathers survival data for a wide range of species, particularly those of current conservation concern.

Ringing revealed that declines in the number of Sedge Warblers breeding in Britain and Ireland was linked to lower levels of rainfall in their African wintering quarters; whilst the recent dramatic decline in the numbers of Song Thrushes was found to relate to a reduction in the survival rate of young birds. This information should aid identification of the environmental factors responsible for the decline.

The BTO is a member of the European Union for Bird Ringing (EURING), and hosts the EURING Databank.

=== Edward Grey Institute ===
In 1938 the BTO contributed funds to the new Edward Grey Institute of Field Ornithology.

In 1947, the institute became part of a new department of Zoological Field Studies at the University of Oxford, and the BTO again concentrated on a programme of volunteer-based surveys.

=== Beech Grove ===
In December 1962, at the behest of Tony Norris, the BTO purchased Beech Grove, a large Victorian house in Tring, Hertfordshire, relocating there from Oxford, along with their Ringing Office, which had been at the British Museum.

=== The Nunnery ===
In April 1991, the BTO moved to The Nunnery, Thetford, Norfolk, a large property lying between the A134 and the River Little Ouse, which had been donated to them. Parts of the medieval Benedictine Nunnery of St George can still be seen on this site.

The BTO also runs its only bird reserve, Nunnery Lakes Reserve, on this site. The reserve lies between the River Thet and the River Little Ouse, extending upstream from The Nunnery, along the banks of the Little Ouse, and incorporates several flooded gravel pits.

In the early 2000s, a new library was created there, dedicated to the memory of Chris Mead. Professor Jeremy Greenwood PhD, who had been Director since 1988, retired in September 2007. The current chief executive officer is Prof Juliet Vickery, as of 2020.

== Activities ==
The BTO carries out research into the lives of birds, chiefly by conducting population and breeding surveys and by bird ringing, largely carried out by a large number of volunteers. Its Garden Birdwatch survey, for example, allows large numbers of birdwatchers to participate, by making a weekly count of the birds they see in their gardens.

=== Journals ===
The BTO publishes a number of journals:

- Bird Study: a scientific journal, published since 1954. ISSN 0006-3657.
- BTO News: the newsletter for all members. ISSN 0005-3392.
- Bird Table: for participants in the Garden BirdWatch Project. ISSN 1460-6755.
- Ringing & Migration: Journal of the BTO Ringing Scheme.
- WeBS News: newsletter for participants in the Wetland Bird Survey.

=== Atlases ===
In September 1967, inspired by on-going work on the innovative Atlas of Breeding Birds of the West Midlands, produced by the West Midland Bird Club, and in partnership with the Irish Wildbird Conservancy (now BirdWatch Ireland), work began on the first Atlas of Breeding Birds in Britain and Ireland. 3,862 10 km squares were surveyed and the atlas was published in 1976.

The New Atlas (1993) updated and refined this huge survey, again with the help of IWC and the Scottish Ornithologists Club. A Winter Atlas and a Historical Atlas have also been published. The groundbreaking Migration Atlas presents the results of almost 100 years of bird ringing. As with all BTO studies, the vast majority of the fieldwork was undertaken by volunteers.

The Bird Atlas 2007–11, published November 2013, combines breeding and winter surveys across the entire UK and Ireland, involving the BTO, Birdwatch Ireland, and the Scottish Ornithologist's Club, in order to produce a new atlas. Fieldwork began in winter 2007, and was due to continue until the end of 2011.

=== Awards ===
The trust awards the Bernard Tucker Medal for services to ornithology, named in memory of Bernard Tucker, the first secretary, and the Dilys Breese Medal in honour of Dilys Breese and several Marsh Awards for Ornithology.

=== BirdTrack ===
BirdTrack is an online citizen science website, operated by the BTO on behalf of a partnership of the BTO, the RSPB, BirdWatch Ireland, the Scottish Ornithologists' Club and the Welsh Ornithological Society.

=== Lectures ===
The Witherby Memorial Lecture is an annual lecture organised by the BTO since 1968.

== Royal patronage ==
HRH Duke of Edinburgh: 1980s? – 19 October 2020

HRH The Prince of Wales: 19 October 2020 – present

- As HRH The Duke of Cambridge: 19 October 2020 – 8 September 2022
- As HRH The Duke of Cornwall and Cambridge: 8 September 2022 – 9 September 2022
