= Witherby Memorial Lecture =

- Awarded for: Ornithology
- Sponsored by: British Trust for Ornithology (BTO)
- First award: 1968
- Website: www.bto.org/about-bto/accounts/witherby-memorial-lectures

The Witherby Memorial Lecture is an academic lectureship awarded by the British Trust for Ornithology (BTO) annually since 1968. The memorial lecture is in memorandum of Harry Forbes Witherby, a former owner of Witherby, who previously published ornithological books.

== Lectures ==
Year	Lecturer	Subject
1968	Arthur Landsborough Thomson	The sub-species concept
1969	David Lack	The number of bird species on islands
1970	H. N. Southern	Tawny Owls
1971	E. M. Nicholson	Geograms
1972	Peter Scott	Species extinction in birds
1973	Beryl Patricia Hall	Speciation and specialisation
1974	Desmond Nethersole-Thompson	Greenshanks
1975	J. C. Coulson	Ringing as an ecological tool
1976	Geoge Dunnet	The ages of birds – adolescence and senility
1977	David Snow	The relationships between the African and European avifaunas
1979	Stanley Cramp	Ornithology and bird conservation
1980	Derek Ratcliffe	The Peregrine falcon
1981	W. G. Hale	The biology of the Redshank
1982	Janet Kear	Some thoughts on eggs
1983	Chris Perrins	A study of the Great tit
1984	Patrick Bateson	Imprinting in young birds
1985	Ian Newton	Individual performance in Sparrowhawks
1986	C. H. Fry	The Bee-eaters
1987	Fred Cooke	Natural selection in Snow Geese
1988	P. R. Evans	Migration strategies of shorebirds
1989	John Krebs, Baron Krebs	Food hoarding in tits
1991	J. D. Goss-Custard	The importance of scale in the study of bird populations
1992	Dick Potts	Is there a future for farmland birds?
1993	Peter Berthold	Some new developments in bird migration research
1994	John Lawton	All change? Numbers and range in the field and in the mind
1995	A. Watson	Thinking, practice and people in bird population ecology
1996	M. Owen	Wildlife and water: partnerships for effective action
1997	M. P. Harris	Individuality in a densely colonial seabird: the Common Guillemot
1998	J. P Croxall	Albatrosses, Fisheries and Futures
1999	D. T. Parkin	Birding and DNA
2000	David Harper	The public and private lives of Robins
2001	Franz Bairlein	The study of bird migration: where to go?
2002	Nicholas Barry Davies	Cuckoo versus host
2003	David Murray Bryant	Swallows – life in an uncertain world
2004	Pat Monaghan	Bad beginnings and untimely ends: Life history trade-offs in birds
2005	W. J. Sutherland	Science and Conservation
2006	Theunis Piersma	What is it like to be a Knot? Towards a cognitive ecology of shorebirds
2007	Mick Marquiss	Case studies with predatory birds
2008	Peter Grant	Evolution of Darwin's finches
2009	Fernando Spina	Birds and rings across the Mediterranean: the role of ringing for science and for conservation in Italy
2010	Tim Birkhead	Sperm and Eggs: Promiscuity in birds
2011	Rhys Green	Birth, death and bird conservation
2012	Sarah Wanless	An Exaltation of Auks
2013	Graham Martin	Through Birds' Eyes
2014	Kevin Gaston	Birds in an urbanising world
2015	Jenny Gill	Migration in space and time
2016	Ben Sheldon	Coping with a variable world: plasticity and social learning in Great tit
2017	Stuart Bearhop	The ups and downs of an extreme migrant
2018	Jane Reid	Ringing, Birding, Migration Ecology & Evolution
2019	Bob Furness	What have the ringers ever done for us? How amateurs make British ornithology great.
2020	Caren Cooper	Flock Together: Innovations Migrating Across Citizen Science
2021	Claire Spottiswoode	Coevolution as an engine of biodiversity: insights from African birds
2022	Professor Peter Marra	Studying Birds in the Context of the Full Annual Cycle
2023	No lecture	
2024	Dr Norman Ratcliffe	Ashmole’s halo and Hutchinson’s hypervolume
