= Alfred Newton Lecture =

Academic prize lecture awarded by the British Ornithologists' Union

The Alfred Newton Lecture is an academic prize lecture awarded by the British Ornithologists' Union. It is named for Alfred Newton.

== Lecturers ==
- 1994 Ian Newton
- 1995 Janet Kear
- 1998 Jared Diamond
- 2003 Chris Perrins
- 2009 Tim Birkhead
- 2018 Hugh Possingham
- 2019 Lei Cao
- 2021 Carl Jones
- 2022 Nicholas B. Davies

== See also ==
- Godman-Salvin Medal
- Union Medal
