= Union Medal of the British Ornithological Union =

The Union Medal is a medal of the British Ornithologists' Union, given "in recognition of eminent services to ornithology and to the Union and ornithology." From 2019 it is to be known as the "Janet Kear Union Medal", after Janet Kear, with a new medal design.

In his history of the BOU, History of the Union, Guy Montfort wrote:

The Union Medal was created in 1912 "to give special recognition for eminent services to ornithology in the field". Under the present Rule 21 it is limited to Union members. Four of these medals were received by members who took part in the Jubilee Expedition to New Guinea. One, in gold, was awarded to the leader W. Goodfellow and three, in silver, to Dr. A. F. R. Wollaston, G. E. Shortridge and Captain C. H. B. Grant.

The BOU introduced the Godman-Salvin Medal, awarded "to an individual as a signal honour for distinguished ornithological work.", and nowadays the Union Medal recognises people "who have given distinguished service to the Union itself".

== Medallists ==
Medallists include:

- 1912 Walter Goodfellow, C. H. B. Grant
- 1948 Willoughby P. Lowe
- 1953 A. W. Boyd
- 1959 W. B. Alexander, E. A. Armstrong, David Armitage Bannerman, Evelyn Baxter, Peter M Scott
- 1960 C. W. Benson
- 1967 Salim Ali
- 1968 J. M. M. Fisher, Charles R. S. Pitman
- 1969 C. W. Mackworth-Praed
- 1970 L. H. Brown
- 1971 Stephen Marchant, Henry Neville Southern, Bernard Stonehouse
- 1972 Derek Goodwin, Norman W. Moore
- 1973 Beryl Patricia Hall
- 1975 Karel H. Voous
- 1976 Ken Williamson, G. C. Shortridge, Alexander F. R. Wollaston
- 1979 Ken E. L. Simmons
- 1980 Geoffrey V. T. Matthews
- 1984 Stanley Cramp, Philip A. D. Hollom, Guy Mountfort
- 1987 Ian Newton
- 1988 James F. Monk
- 1989 Robert Spencer
- 1991 F. B. M. Campbell
- 1992 Michael Philip Harris
- 1993 Ronald M. Lockley
- 1995 R. Tory Peterson
- 1996 Christopher J. Mead
- 1997 Robert A. F. Gillmor, John Sidney Ash
- 1998 Janet Kear
- 2004 Gwen Bonham
- 2008 Christopher J. Feare
- 2011 Peter Jones
- 2012 Andy Gosler
- 2013 Neil J. Bucknell
- 2015 John Croxall
- 2016 Chris Perrins
- 2017 Prof Jenny Gill (former BOU President)

== See also ==
- Alfred Newton Lecture
- Godman-Salvin Medal
- List of ornithology awards
