= James Stuart Thomson =

Scottish zoologist (1868–1932)

James Stuart Thomson FRSE FLS (21 July 1868 – 28 August 1932) was a 19th/20th century British zoologist. He was an expert on the tortoise.

== Life ==
He was born on 21 July 1868 at Pilmuir near East Saltoun in East Lothian, the youngest son and seventh child of Rev Arthur Thomson (1823-1881) a minister of the Free Church of Scotland, and his wife, Isabella Landsborough.

He studied Science at the University of Edinburgh then did further postgraduate studies at Freiburg University in Germany and the University of Berne in Switzerland, also undertaking practical experience at several marine biology stations. He held teaching posts at Plymouth and Edinburgh and then Assistant Biologist at the research station at the Cape of Good Hope in 1903. He helped assess material from the Challenger Expedition in Edinburgh and at the Granton Marine Station.

He was elected a Fellow of the Royal Society of Edinburgh in 1906. His proposers were Ramsay Traquair, William Eagle Clarke, William Carmichael McIntosh and Thomas Nicol Johnston.

He spent some time lecturing in zoology at the South African College and University of Bristol before accepting a permanent position at the University of Manchester in 1910, lecturing under Prof Sydney J. Hickson.

He retired due to ill-health in 1929 and moved to Cirencester. He died in Swansea on 28 August 1932.

== Family ==
He was younger brother to Arthur Thomson and uncle to Arthur Landsborough Thomson.

== Publications ==
- Thomson, J. Stuart (1932). "The Anatomy of the Tortoise". The Scientific Proceedings of the Royal Dublin Society. (new series) vol 20 (28). OCLC 6689749.
