= Leslie Hilton Brown =

Leslie Hilton Brown OBE
- Born: 25 August 1917; Coonoor, British India
- Died: 6 August 1980 (aged 62); Karen, Kenya
- Education: Oundle School
- Alma mater: St Andrews University; Cambridge University
- Occupations: Agriculturalist; Ornithologist
- Parent: Hilton Brown
- Awards: British Ornithologists' Union Medal (1970)

Leslie Hilton Brown OBE (25 August 1917 – 6 August 1980) was a British agriculturalist and naturalist.

Brown was born in Coonoor, India to a Scottish family in 1917, the son of Hilton Brown, novelist, biographer and BBC radio producer. He was educated at Oundle School and St Andrews University where he studied zoology. He then studied courses in tropical agriculture at Cambridge University and the Imperial College of Agriculture in Trinidad. He later earned a PhD from St Andrews in 1973.

He moved to Nigeria in 1940 to work for the Colonial Agricultural Service and then to Kenya in 1946 where he lived for the rest of his life. By 1956 he was Deputy Director of Agriculture and from 4 November 1959 was Chief Agriculturalist, and from 9 July 1962 was Director of Agriculture. Following his retirement in 1963, he was appointed an Officer of the Order of the British Empire (OBE) in the 1964 New Year Honours, for services to agriculture. While working as an agriculturalist he made time for a large amount of field ornithological research, especially on eagles, pelicans and flamingos, which resulted in a number of scientific papers and several books. He continued this work after he retired and also did consultant work on wildlife, land development and range management for various local and world agencies. He collaborated with the University of Addis Ababa and the Ethiopian Wildlife Conservation Department in wildlife studies and was president of the East African Natural History Society from 1961 to 1963. He continued writing right up until his death, despite ill health. Along with several books, including British Birds of Prey in the Collins New Naturalist series, he wrote the Encyclopædia Britannica entry on the Falconiforms. He was elected a member of the British Ornithologists' Union in 1942 and a Corresponding Member in 1980, having been awarded their Union Medal in 1970.

Obituaries were published in British Birds, Scopus, The Ibis, Scottish Birds, and Raptor Research.

== Bibliography ==
- Brown, Leslie H; Amadon, Dean (1968). Eagles, Hawks and Falcons of the World. (two volumes)
- —— (1973). The Mystery of the Flamingos.
- —— (1976). British Birds of Prey. Collins.
- —— (1979). Encounters with Nature.
- Brown, Leslie H; Urban, Emile K; Newman, Kenneth (1982). Birds of Africa. London: Academy Press.
