= Trade Aid =

New Zealand fair trade organisation

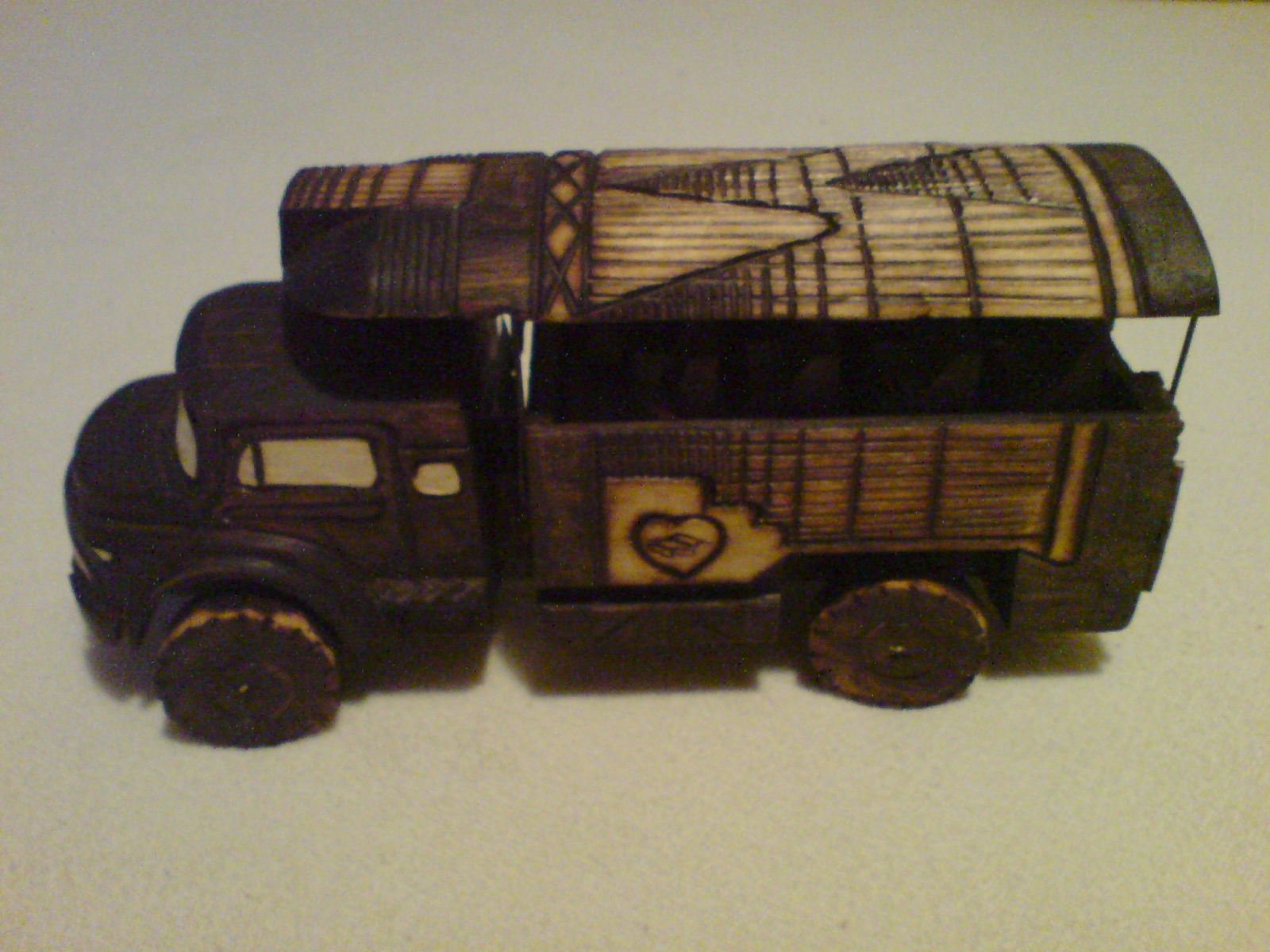
- A typical Trade Aid craft, wooden car model
- Formation: 1973; 52 years ago
- Type: Fair trade, non-government organization
- Legal status: Charity
- Headquarters: Christchurch, New Zealand
- Website: https://www.tradeaid.org.nz/

Trade Aid a is New Zealand fair trade organisation established in 1973. The charity aims to build just and sustainable communities around the globe through fair trade. It sources ethical supply chains and imports coffee, chocolate and crafts from impoverish farmers and artisans.

The organisation was founded by Christchurch couple Vi and Richard Cottrell. Until 2025, it sold crafts and food items in 29 Trade Aid stores, as well as coffee roasteries, cafes and supermarkets throughout New Zealand; however, to protect its long-term sustainability, it shifted to wholesale and online sales. The factory in New Zealand that produced fair trade organic chocolate shut down, after facing competition from corporate chocolate manufacturers.

CORSO was a strong supporter of Trade Aid. Trade Aid's goals align with other New Zealand community organisation, including Citizens Advice Bureau New Zealand and Volunteer Service Abroad – Te Tūao Tāwāhi (VSA).
