= Godman-Salvin Medal =

Godman-Salvin Prize (Medal)
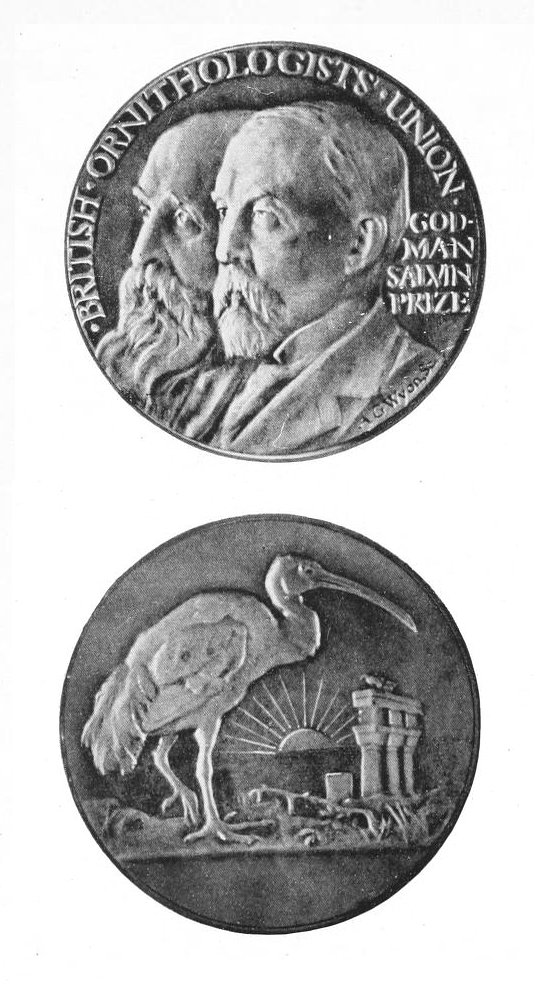
- The Godman-Salvin medal was instituted in 1919, the medal was designed by Allan G. Wyon
- Awarded for: “as a signal honour for distinguished ornithological work”
- Sponsored by: British Ornithological Union (BOU)
- First award: 1922
- Website: www.bou.org.uk/about-the-bou/governance-and-administration/medals-and-awards/

The Godman-Salvin Medal is a medal of the British Ornithologists' Union awarded "to an individual as a signal honour for distinguished ornithological work." It was instituted in 1919 in the memory of Frederick DuCane Godman and Osbert Salvin.

== Medallists ==
Medallists include:

- 1922 W. E. Clarke
- 1929 Ernst Hartert
- 1930 W. L. Sclater
- 1936 Hubert Lynes
- 1938 H. F. Witherby
- 1946 P. R. Lowe
- 1951 Richard Meinertzhagen
- 1959 D. L. Lack, Landsborough Thomson
- 1962 E. M. Nicholson
- 1966 R. E. Moreau
- 1968 W. H. Thorpe
- 1969 Niko Tinbergen
- 1971 Julian Huxley
- 1977 Vero C. Wynne-Edwards
- 1982 David W. Snow
- 1988 Chris M. Perrins
- 1990 George M. Dunnet
- 1991 Derek A. Ratcliffe
- 1992 John C. Coulson
- 1995 Ernst Mayr
- 1996 Peter R. Evans
- 1999 G.R. "Dick" Potts
- 2004 J. P. Croxall
- 2006 Michael P. Harris
- 2009 Rhys Green
- 2010 Ian Newton
- 2013 Robert J. Fuller
- 2015 Sarah Wanless
- 2016 Tim Birkhead
- 2017 Pat Monaghan
- 2018 Kathy Martin
- 2020 Theunis Piersma
- 2022 Nicholas B. Davies
- 2023 Lei Cao
- 2024 P. Dee Boersma
- 2025 R. W. Furness

== See also ==
- Alfred Newton Lecture
- Union Medal
- List of ornithology awards
