= Sarah Wanless =

English ornithologist and research ecologist

Professor Sarah Wanless MBE FRSE
- Born: Scarborough, England

Academic background
- Education: University of Aberdeen

Academic work
- Discipline: Marine ecology
- Institutions: Centre for Ecology & Hydrology

Sarah Wanless MBE FRSE is a British animal ecologist. She is an expert on seabirds; she is a Fellow of the Royal Society of Edinburgh and is Honorary Professor at the Universities of Glasgow and Aberdeen.

== Education and career ==
Wanless was born in Scarborough, England and moved to Aberdeen, Scotland in 1969 for her undergraduate degree and then her PhD at the University of Aberdeen, which focused on northern gannets over three seasons on the island of Ailsa Craig in the Firth of Clyde.

She worked at the Institute of Terrestrial Ecology, the Nature Conservancy Council and the British Antarctic Survey before joining the Centre for Ecology & Hydrology (CEH) permanently in 1996 as a Higher Scientific Officer. She rose to Individual Merit Scientist and retired in 2016 but is still involved with research as Emeritus Fellow at CEH.

== Research ==
In the 1980s, Wanless began one of the first radio-tracking studies into seabirds in the Northern Hemisphere, which helped to identify the foraging areas and the dangers that seabirds face due to climate change, pollution, fishing and off-shore wind farms; much of this research was conducted on the Isle of May in the Firth of Forth in Scotland. She was the first female visiting scientist to the British Antarctic Survey's research station on Bird Island in South Georgia, where she studied the diving behaviour of South Georgia shags for two southern summers. Wanless also studied gannets on Bempton Cliffs in Yorkshire and researched the foraging of puffins outside of the breeding season.

Over her career, Wanless has published over 250 papers, her bird tracking data was contributed to the Global Seabird Tracking Database.

== Honours and awards ==
Wanless was appointed Member of the Order of the British Empire (MBE) in the 2023 New Year Honours for services to seabird ecology.

- Elected a Fellow of the Royal Society of Edinburgh in 2006
- Awarded the Marsh Award for Conservation Biology by the Zoological Society London and the Marsh Christian Trust in 2007
- Gave the British Trust for Ornithology's Witherby Memorial Lecture in 2012
- Awarded the Godman-Salvin Medal by the British Ornithological Union in 2015
- Named one of the Outstanding Women of Scotland in 2018 by the Saltire Society
- Awarded the Peter Scott Memorial Award by the British Naturalists' Association in 2019
- Received an honorary Professorship in the Division of Environmental and Evolutionary Biology at the University of Glasgow and an honorary Professorship in the Department of Zoology at the University of Aberdeen
- Given lifetime achievement awards from the UK Seabird Group and the Pacific Seabird Group

== Bibliography ==
Wanless wrote The Puffin with Mike P. Harris, published in 2012 by Bloomsbury ISBN 978-1-4081-0867-3, a revised version of the original 1984 Poyser monograph.
