= Union Medal (disambiguation) =

The Union Medal was an award for military service in South Africa.

Union Medal may also refer to:

- Union Medal of the British Ornithological Union
- Union Medal, an medal of Tanzania

== See also ==
- Unitas Medal
- Orders, decorations, and medals of the Soviet Union
