= Hilton Brown =

Hilton Brown may refer to:

- Hilton Brown (writer) (1890–1961), Scottish writer and Indian Civil Service officer
- Hilton Brown (swimmer) (born 1946), New Zealand swimmer and swimming coach
