= Kathy Martin (scientist) =

Canadian scientist (1949- )

Mary Catherine Martin
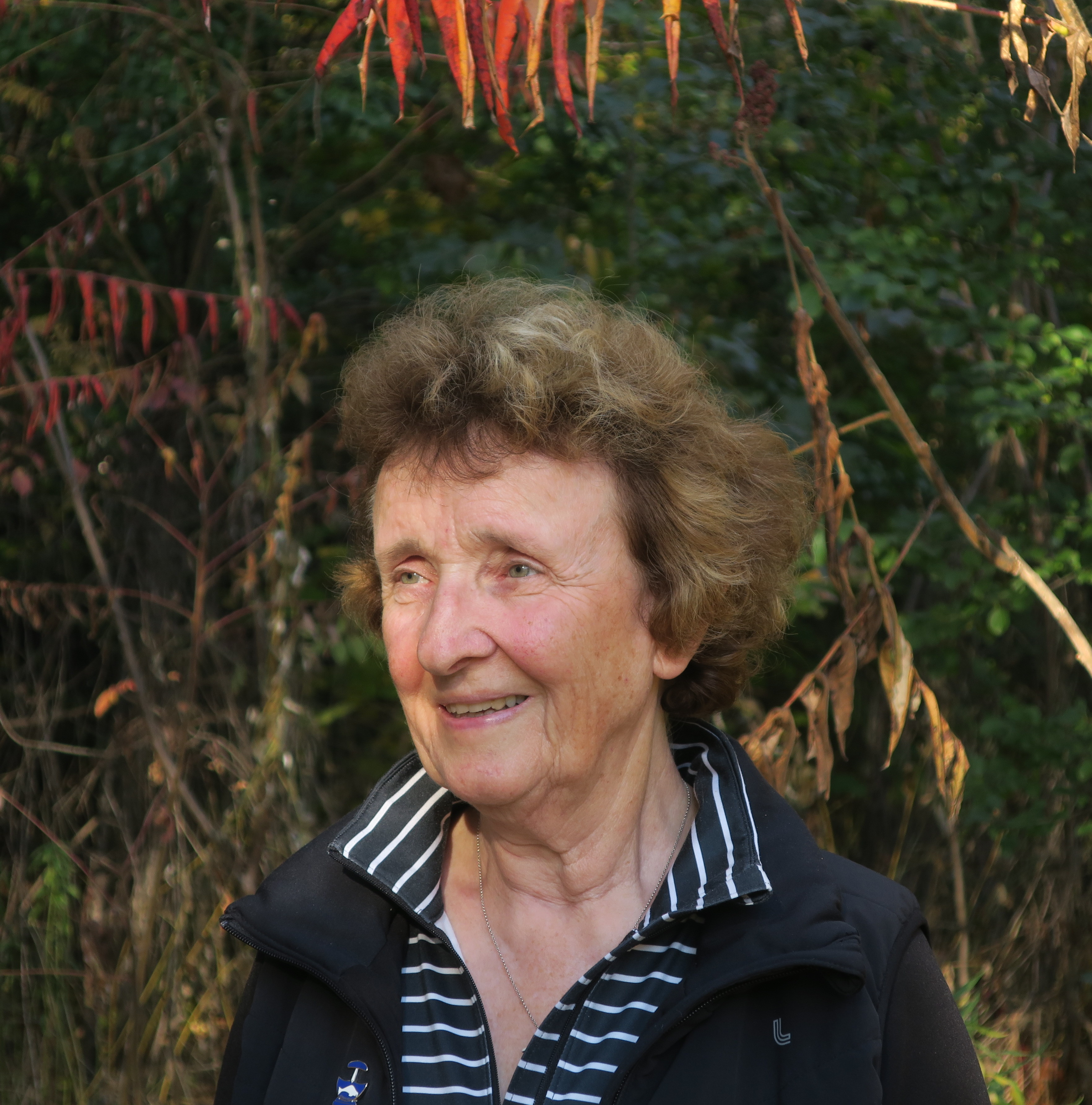
- Prof. Kathy Martin in 2019
- Born: March 28, 1949 (age 77); Prince Edward Island, Canada
- Occupations: University Professor and Federal Government Research Scientist
- Known for: Cavity Using Wildlife and Alpine and Arctic Avifauna
- Awards: Honorary Degree, Doctor of Letters, University of Prince Edward Island (2023) Brewster Medal, American Ornithological Society (2021)

Academic background
- Education: B.Sc. Biology (1970) University of Prince Edward Island M.Sc. Zoology (1973) University of Alberta Ph.D. Biology (1985) Queen's University
- Thesis: The utility of bi-parental care in Willow Ptarmigan: ecological and evolutionary considerations (1985)
- Doctoral advisor: Fred Cooke

Academic work
- Discipline: Conservation Biologist
- Sub-discipline: Ornithologist
- Institutions: University of British Columbia; Environment and Climate Change Canada
- Website: https://profiles.forestry.ubc.ca/person/kathy-martin/

Kathy Martin is a Canadian ornithologist and an expert on arctic and alpine grouse and ptarmigan, and on tree cavity-nesting vertebrates. She is a professor in the Faculty of Forestry at the University of British Columbia, and was a senior research scientist with Environment and Climate Change Canada. From 2018 to 2020 she was president of the American Ornithological Society. Martin retired from the Canadian Federal Government in December 2020, and remains an emeritus scientist.

Martin has been active in Canada's Conservation Biology research and higher education community since the 1980s. In the 1990s she represented Canada on the International Union for Conservation of Nature IUCN Species Survival Commission for grouse (galliformes). During the 2000s, Martin served on the council of the American Ornithologists Union (2003–07), and chaired the Natural Sciences and Engineering Research Council Ecology and Evolution Grant Committee.

Martin participated in early discussions about the formation of the Canadian Society for Ecology and Evolution in 2006, and was a founding member of the organization, later serving on its Governing Council (2008-11). In 1996, Martin and her colleagues received The Wildlife Society's Wildlife Publication award, for their paper "Impact of food and predation on the snowshoe hare cycle." In 1992, when she was an assistant professor at the University of Toronto, Scarborough College, Martin developed and taught one of the earliest courses in Conservation Biology in Canada: C65S.

Martin founded and directed two primary, long-term research programs in the Americas. The first, on the life history variation and ecology of alpine birds, began in 1980 and has expanded to sites in Australia, while the second, examining the structure and function of cavity-nesting vertebrate communities, commenced in 1995 and expanded to other sites across North and South America. Her co-edited volume, Ecology and Conservation of Mountain Birds was published by Cambridge University Press in 2023.

== Early life and education ==
Kathy Martin is a native of Prince Edward Island, Canada. She received her undergraduate degree in Biology from the University of Prince Edward Island in 1970. She then completed an MSc at the University of Alberta, Edmonton in 1973, and a PhD at Queen's University, Kingston 1985, with geneticist Fred Cooke.

Following the completion of her doctorate on Willow Ptarmigan ecology, Martin received a Natural Sciences and Engineering Research Council of Canada post-doctoral fellowship at the University of Alberta (1985–1988).

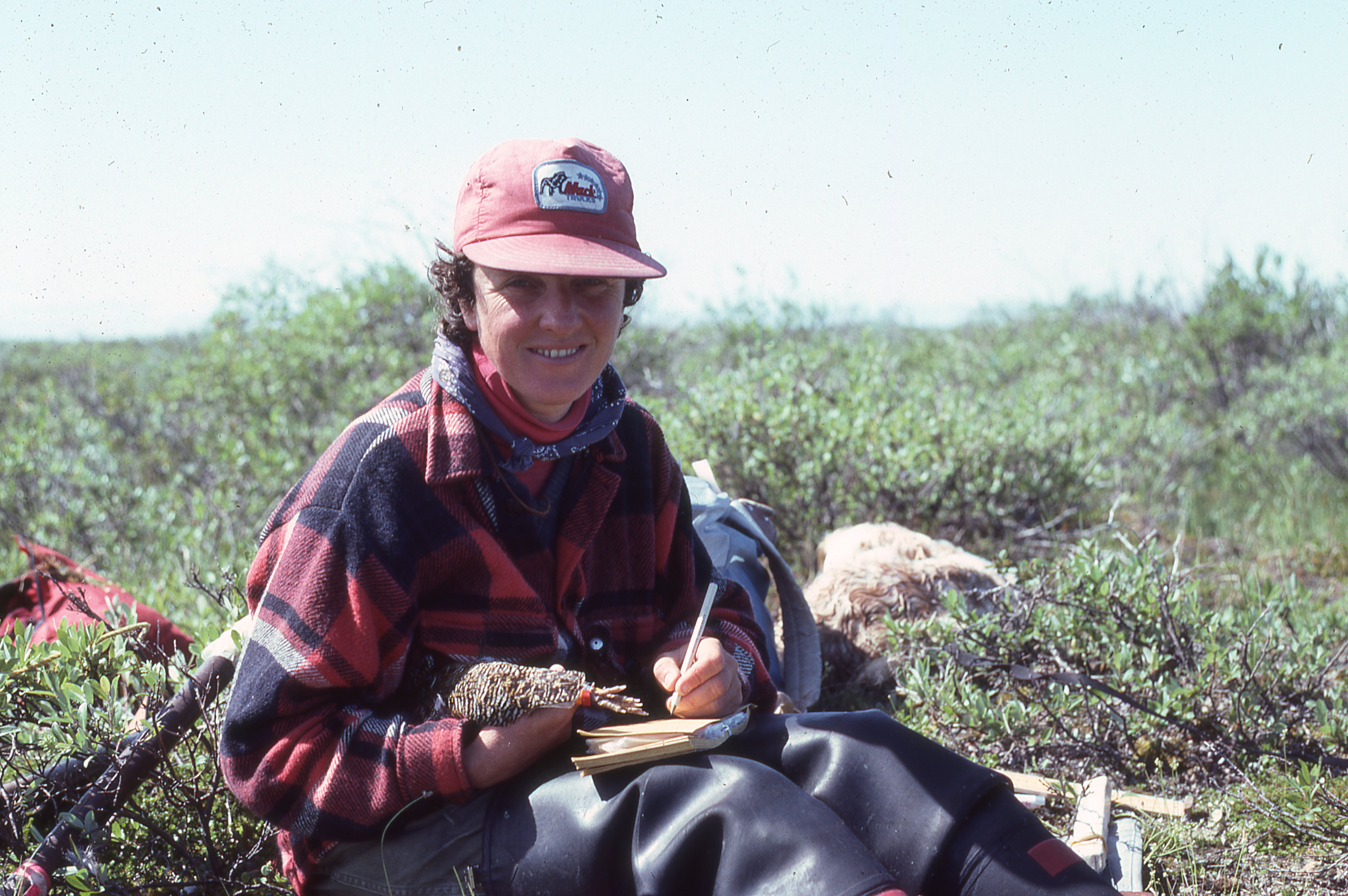
Kathy Martin holding a willow ptarmigan in 1983

== Early career ==
Martin was involved with natural history and citizen science activities and groups. She founded and edited the first forty issues of the Prince Edward Island Natural History society's newsletter. In 1977, Martin wrote the guide to Island Woodland Plants.

In 1981, Martin authored the monograph Watershed Red, about the natural history of the Dunk River Watershed in Prince Edward Island.

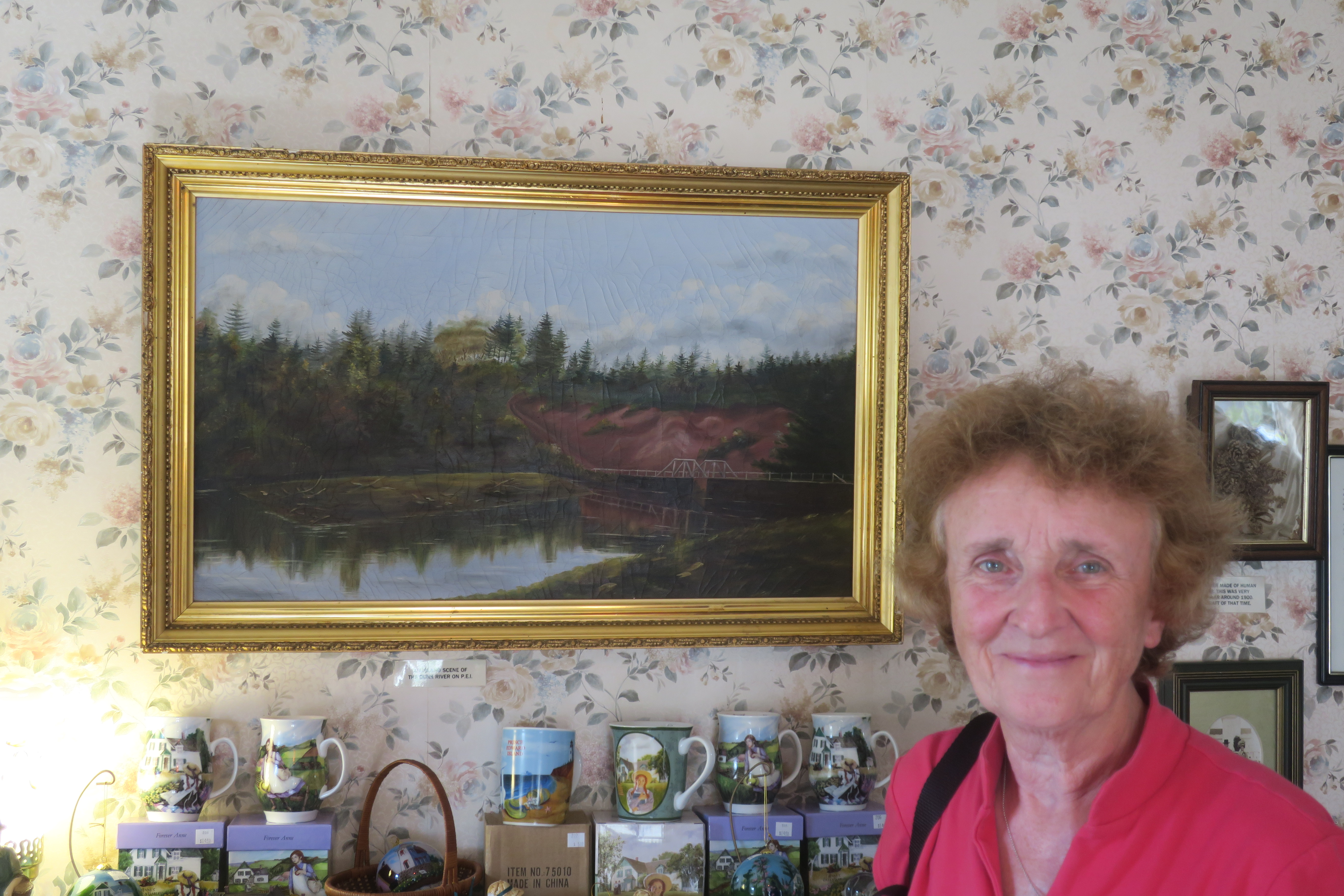
Martin with a painting of the Dunk River at Lucy Maud Montgomery's Birthplace

After completing undergraduate and post-graduate degrees, Martin held posts as an assistant professor at the Université de Sherbrooke from 1988–89, then an NSERC University Research Fellow, and then assistant professor in life sciences at the University of Toronto Scarborough campus from 1989–1992. In 1993, Martin assumed a joint appointment with the Faculty of Forestry at the University of British Columbia and Environment and Climate Change Canada.

Martin has published over 200 journal articles and book chapters.

== Service to Academia and Conservation Biology ==
- Prince Edward Island Forestry Commission, member, 2023-25
- American Ornithological Society, president, 2018-20
- American Ornithological Society, president elect, 2016-18
- Bird Studies Canada Scientific Advisory Board, since 2010
- International Ornithologists' Union, Canadian delegate, since 2010
- IUCN/ICBP (The World Conservation Union) Specialist Group for Galliformes; Canadian representative, since 1996
- International Ornithological Union, member of Scientific Program Committee, January 2015
- North American Ornithological Conference, Vancouver, chair, 2012
- Canadian Society for Ecology and Evolution, founding board member, 2008–2011
- Natural Sciences and Engineering Research Council Grant Selection Committee – Evolution and Ecology chair 2003–04
- Society of Canadian Ornithologists, president, 2000–02

== Awards ==
- 2023 Honorary Degree, Doctor of Letters, University of Prince Edward Island
- 2021 Jamie Smith Memorial Mentoring Award, Society of Canadian Ornithologists
- 2021 Brewster Medal, American Ornithological Society
- 2021 Distinguished Alumni Award, University of Prince Edward Island
- 2020 Nancy Cutler Citation of Excellence Women in Science and Technology Award, Environment and Climate Change Canada, Ottawa, Canada
- 2018 Godman-Salvin Medal from the British Ornithologists' Union
- 2016 Canadian Section of The Wildlife Society's Ian McTaggart-Cowan Lifetime Achievement Award
- 2008 Doris Huestis Speirs Award for Outstanding Lifetime Contributions to Canadian Ornithology, Canadian Society of Ornithologists
- 2003 5NR Science Award to Leaders in Sustainable Development, Natural Resources, Canada

== Selected Publications ==
- Chamberlain, D., Lehikoinen, A. and Martin, K. eds., 2023. Ecology and Conservation of Mountain Birds. Cambridge University Press. ISBN 9781108938570 doi:10.1017/9781108938570
- Van der Hoek Y, Gaona, GV, Martin K. 2017. The diversity, distribution and conservation status of the tree-cavity nesting birds of the world. Divers Distrib. 23: 1120–1131. doi:10.1111/ddi.12601
- Boyle WA, Martin K. 2015. The conservation value of high elevation habitats to North American migrant birds. Biol Conserv. 192: 461–476. doi:10.1016/j.biocon.2015.10.008
- Jackson MM, Gergel SE, Martin K. 2015. Citizen science and field survey observations provide comparable results for mapping Vancouver Island White-tailed Ptarmigan (Lagopus leucura saxatilis) distributions. Biol Conserv. 181: 162–172. doi:10.1016/j.biocon.2014.11.010
- Cockle, KL, Martin K, Wesolowski, T. 2011. Woodpeckers, decay and the future of cavity-nesting vertebrate communities worldwide. Front Ecol Environ. 9: 377–382. doi:10.1890/110013
- Sandercock BK, Martin K, Segelbacher G, editors. 2011. Ecology, conservation and management of grouse. Studies in Avian Biology. Berkeley (CA): University of California Press. 378 p.
- Martin K, Aitken KEH, Wiebe KL. 2004. Nest sites and nest webs for cavity-nesting communities in interior British Columbia, Canada: nest characteristics and niche partitioning. Condor. 106: 5-19. doi:10.1650/7482
- Martin K, Wiebe KL. 2004. Coping mechanisms of alpine and arctic breeding birds: extreme weather and limitations to reproductive resilience. Integr Comp Biol. 44: 177–185. doi:10.1093/icb/44.2.177
- Martin K. 1981. Watershed Red: The life of the Dunk River, Prince Edward Island. Charlottetown (PEI): Ragweed Press. 155p.
- Martin K. 1977. Island woodland plants. Charlottetown (PEI): Dept. Environment. 74 p. [reprinted 1983 and 2008 available at: https://www.princeedwardisland.ca/sites/default/files/publications/pei_woodland_plants.pdf].
