= Stuart Bearhop =

British ecologist

Stu Bearhop
- Born: Stuart Bearhop
- Education: University of Glasgow (BSc, PhD)
- Awards: Witherby Memorial Lecture (2017)
- Scientific career
- Fields: Foraging ecology Migration; Stable isotopes
- Workplaces: University of Exeter; Queen's University Belfast; Durham University
- Thesis: Stable isotopes in feathers and blood as a tool to investigate diet and mercury dynamics of seabirds (1999)
- Website: biosciences.exeter.ac.uk/staff/index.php?web_id=stuart_bearhop

Stuart Bearhop SFHEA is a Professor of animal ecology at the University of Exeter. His research makes use of stable isotope analysis.

== Education ==
Bearhop obtained a Bachelor of Science degree and a PhD from the University of Glasgow in 1995 and 1999 respectively.

== Career and research ==
In 2012 Bearhop was appointed a Senior Fellow of the Higher Education Academy (SFHEA). From 1999 to 2000 he was a postdoctoral researcher at the University of Glasgow and then from that year to 2001 worked as Natural Environment Research Council (NERC) postdoctoral research associate at the Durham University. He continued working for NERC until 2003 when he became Independent Research Fellow at both Queen's University Belfast (QUB) & University of Glasgow and from 2004 to 2006 was a lecturer on conservation biology at QUB. Because of the success of lectures at QUB, he was promoted to a senior lecturer in the same topic and joined University of Exeter faculty in 2007. In 2010 he became an Associate Professor of animal ecology and next year was promoted to Professor in the same field.

In 2005 Stuart Bearhop and Peter Berthold studied Eurasian blackcap and other song birds in Austria and Germany and discovered that all bird species hibernate at the same time.

In 2008 Stuart and Gillian Robb had studied birds and it attractiveness to various bird feeders in Northern Ireland and Cornwall and in 2010 Stuart teamed up with Timothy Harrison, Jim Reynolds, Dan Chamberlain and Graham Martin to study blue tits' artificial feeding.

In 2013 Dr. Stuart Bearhop had worked with the University of Leeds' Drs. Keith Hamer and Ewan Wakefield and Thomas Bodey of University of Exeter to study northern gannet at the Bempton Cliffs in the East Riding of Yorkshire.

From 2013 to 2014 he returned to Northern Ireland and Cornwall where he studied blue tits and discovered that their offspring survival depends on how well the parents get fed in winter.

He remained in those places for another two years due to extensive study which continued from 2015 to 8 to 10 January 2016. The last two years showed that every time a human feeds the birds the tits get a chick more while in Cornwall the same species used to get more fatter and therefore produced fewer chicks.

In 2016 he had praised Chinese officials for imposing the ivory ban to protect elephant species in Asia and Africa. In 2017 Bearhop got a grant from European Research Council to study Brant, a species of goose and climate change and its affects on the species.
