= Sylvia Gytha de Lancey Chapman =

Doctor, medical superintendent, welfare worker

Sylvia Gytha de Lancey Chapman (27 November 1896 – 1 September 1995) was a New Zealand medical doctor, medical superintendent and welfare worker.

== Life ==
Chapman was born in Dunedin, New Zealand, on 27 November 1896. She attended school at Woodford House in Havelock North and then Victoria University. She graduated from the University of Otago medical school in 1921. She then worked at Gisborne Hospital followed by general practice in Wellington.

In 1924 she was awarded the LM at the Rotunda Hospital in Dublin. She later gained an MD in 1934 from the University of New Zealand with a thesis on perinatal toxaemia. From 1936 to 1946 she was Medical Superintendent of St Helens Hospital in Wellington.

In addition to her medical practice Chapman was active in many other organisations and committees. In 1936 she served on the committee of inquiry into abortion which produced the MacMillan Report (1937). She then continued on the Committee of Inquiry into Maternity Services in 1937. She was the first woman to be on the senate of the University of New Zealand from 1937 to 1946. From 1929 to 1939 she was national president of the YWCA.

During World War II as president of the YWCA she worked to assist Polish and German refugees who had emigrated to New Zealand. The YWCA was one of the organisations which created a new relief organisation, the New Zealand Council of Organisations for Relief Service Overseas (CORSO). Chapman led a medical team for CORSO in Greece in 1946. Unable to visit Poland when the relief team left Greece she went to England where she was appointed resident obstetrician at Dulwich Hospital in London in 1948. She became the honorary registrar of the newly formed Royal College of General Practitioners from 1953 to 1962.

Chapman retired to Bexhill-on-Sea where she died on 1 September 1995.
