= British Ornithologists' Union checklists =

The British Ornithologists' Union checklists are a series of books published by the British Ornithologists' Union (BOU) and (from 2003) jointly with the British Ornithologists' Club (BOC) documenting the status of bird in various regions of the world. Each volume contains a systematic list of bird species recorded in the area. In many cases the BOU checklist was the first such work for the country in question.

== The books ==
Volumes produced to date (year of publication in brackets) are:

- 1. The Birds of Libya by G. Bundy
- 2. The Birds of Zanzibar and Pemba by R. H. Pakenham
- 3. The Birds of The Gambia (2nd edition, 1991) by M. E. J. Gore
- 4. The Birds of Nigeria (2nd edition, 1994) by J. Helgood, J. B. Heigham, Amberley M. Moore, Anne N. Nason, R. E. Sharland and N. J. Skinner
- 5. The Birds of the Serengeti National Park, Tanzania by D. Schmidl
- 6. The Birds of Cyprus (2nd Edition, 1992) by P. R. Flint and P. F. Stewart
- 7. The Birds of Wallacea (1986) by C. M. N. White and M. D. Bruce
- 8. The Birds of the South Bahamas (1987) by D. W. Buden
- 9. The Birds of Ghana by L. G. Grimes
- 10. The Birds of Sumatra (1988) by J. G. van Marle and Karel H Voous
- 11. The Birds of Sicily (1989) by Carmelo Iapichino and Bruno Massa
- 12. The Birds of the Philippines (1991) by E. C. Dickinson, R. S. Kennedy and K. C. Parkes
- 13. The Birds of the Cape Verde Islands (1995) by C. J. Hazevoet
- 14. The Birds of Togo (1996) by Robert A. Cheke and J. Frank Walsh
- 15. The Birds of St Lucia (1997) by Allan R. Keith
- 16. The Birds of St Helena (1998) by Beau Rowlands et al.
- 17. The Birds of Corsica (1999) by J-C. Thibault and G. Bonaccorsi
- 18. The Birds of Angola (2000) by W. R. J. Dean
- 19. The Birds of the Cayman Islands (2000) by Patricia E. Bradley
- 20. The Birds of Hispaniola (2003) by Allan R. Keith, James W. Wiley, Steven C. Latta and José A. Ottenwalder
- 21. The Birds of Morocco (2003) by Michel Thévenot, Rae Vernon and Patrick Bergier
- 22. The Birds of the Gulf of Guinea (2006) by Alan Tye and Peter Jones
- 23. The Birds of the Borneo (2008) by Clive F. Mann
- 24. The Birds of the Barbados (2009) by P.A. Buckley, Edward B. Massiah, Maurice B. Hutt, Francine G. Buckley and Hazel F. Hutt
