= Alfred Newton =

English zoologist and ornithologist

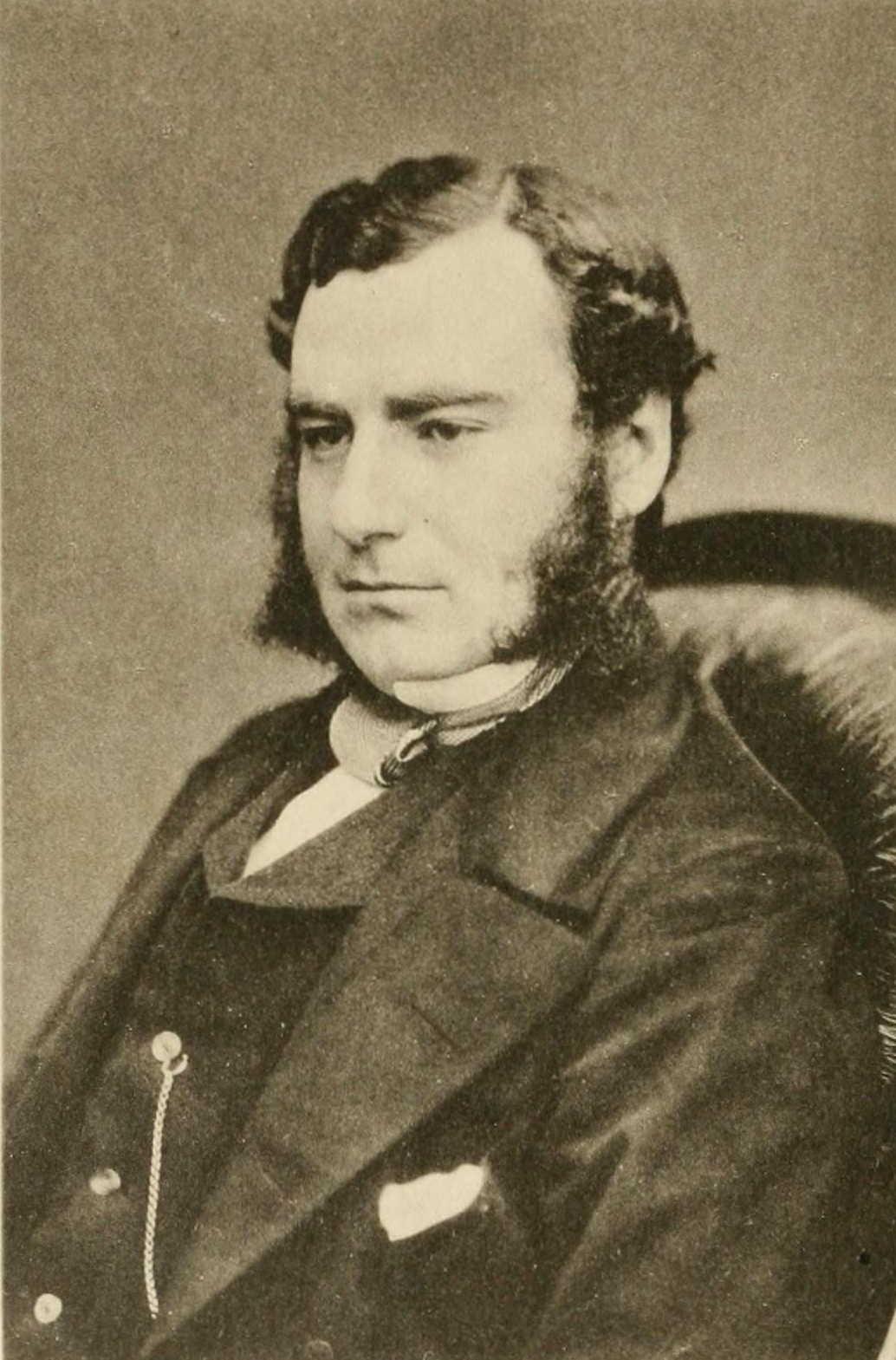
- Born: 11 June 1829; Geneva, Switzerland
- Died: 7 June 1907 (aged 77); Cambridge, England
- Education: Magdalene College, Cambridge
- Awards: Royal Medal (1900); Linnean Medal (1900)
- Scientific career
- Fields: Zoology; Ornithology
- Workplaces: Cambridge University
- Author abbrev. (zoology): A. Newton

Alfred Newton FRS HFRSE (11 June 1829 – 7 June 1907) was an English zoologist and ornithologist. Newton was Professor of Comparative Anatomy at Cambridge University from 1866 to 1907. Among his numerous publications were a four-volume Dictionary of Birds (1893–6), entries on ornithology in the Encyclopædia Britannica (9th edition) while also an editor of the journal Ibis from 1865 to 1870. In 1900 he was awarded the Royal Medal of the Royal Society and the Gold Medal of the Linnaean Society. He founded the British Ornithologists Union.

== Life ==
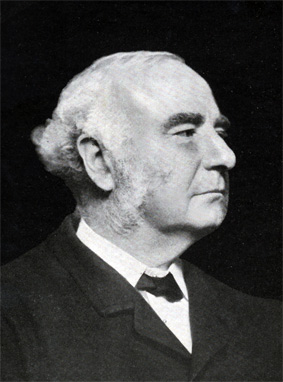
Professor Newton in later life

Alfred Newton was born near Geneva in Switzerland, the fifth son of William Newton of Elveden Hall in Suffolk, Member of Parliament (MP) for Ipswich; his mother Elizabeth (1789–1843) was the daughter of Richard Slater Milnes, MP for York. The family wealth was founded on sugar plantations in the Caribbean, where Alfred's grandfather Samuel Newton had a plantation in St Kitts, and a property in St Croix. William Newton returned to England in 1813, purchasing the property of Elveden, near Thetford from the Earl of Albemarle. Elveden (pronounced and sometimes spelt 'Eldon') was built in 1770 by Admiral Augustus Keppel. After the Newtons left, Elveden Hall and its estate were bought by Prince Duleep Singh in 1863, and later by the Guinness family (Earl of Iveagh).

In 1828 the Newton family made a trip to Italy, and on the way back Alfred was born on 11 June 1829 at Les Délices, a chateau near Geneva. He suffered an accident when about five or six, which left him somewhat lame in one leg. He went to school in 1844, attending Mr. Walker's school at Stetchworth near Newmarket. He kept birds in cages and looked after other animals from a young age.

As a youth Newton shot game birds – black or red grouse, common pheasant, partridge. Birds became an abiding interest. Those included the great bustard (Otis tarda), Montagu's harrier (Circus pygargus), ravens, buzzards (Buteo sp.), redpolls, wrynecks (Jynx), which are small woodpeckers that specialise in feeding on ants. "The vast warrens of the 'Breck', the woods and water-meadows of the valley of the Little Ouse, and the neighbouring Fenland made an ideal training-ground for a naturalist". This enthusiasm Newton shared with his younger brother Edward: the two carried out bird observation when they were together and corresponded when they were apart.

In 1846 Newton went to a tutor in Biggleswade for a few months, and in 1848 he entered Magdalene College, Cambridge. He graduated B.A. in 1853. He took a particular interest in zoology and corresponded with many ornithologists of the time. A meeting with John Wolley at Cambridge in 1851 made them lifelong friends. He spent the rest of his life at Magdalene, and never married. A fall later in life, when he was on a trip to Heligoland, further crippled him, and he then walked with the aid of two sticks, instead of one, as formerly. "From a three-legged, he has become a four-legged man" commented a friend.

Newton died on 7 June 1907 of heart failure at the Old Lodge in Magdalene. He is buried in the Parish of the Ascension Burial Ground in Cambridge.

== Career ==
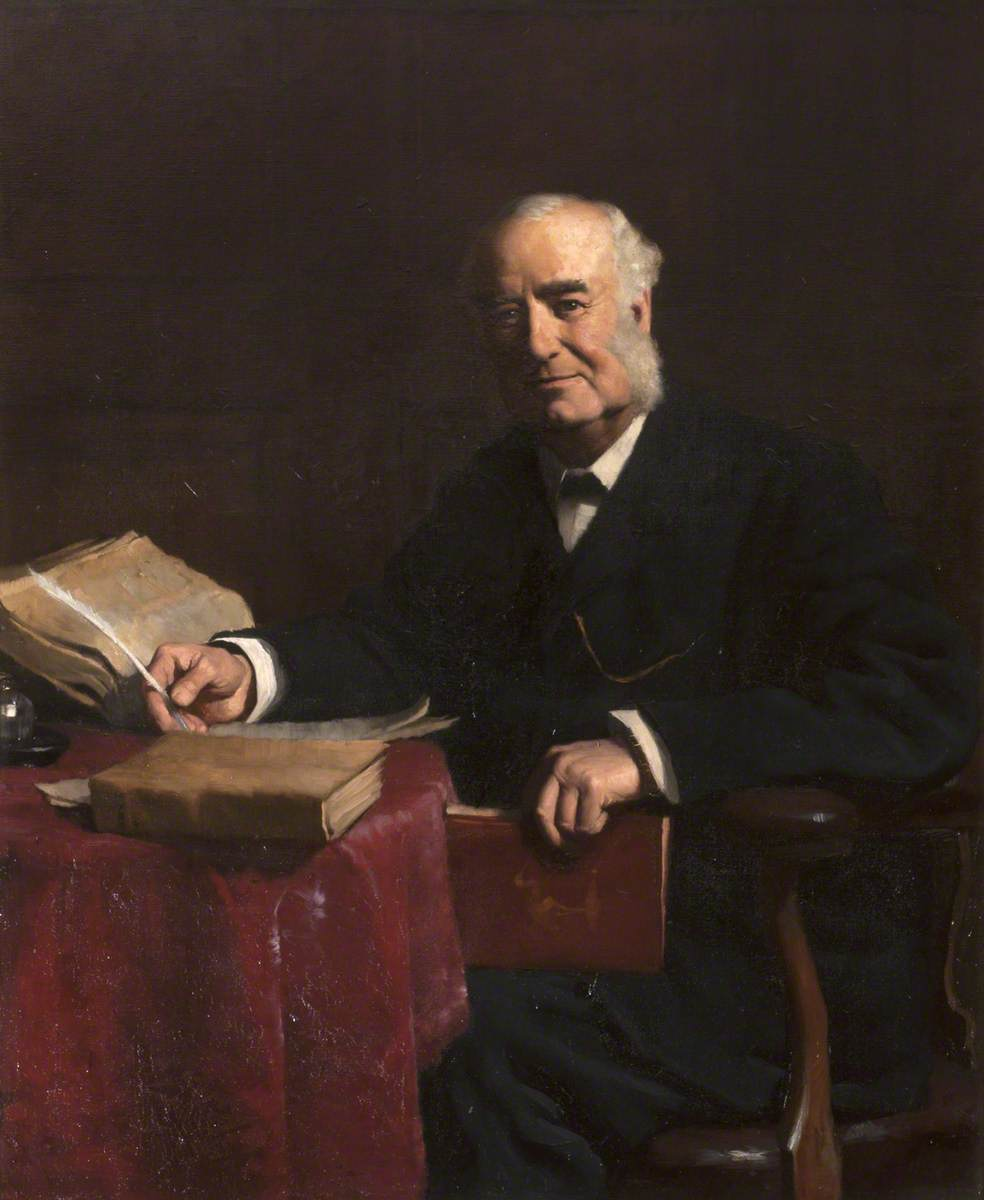
Portrait of Alfred Newton by C. W. Furse (1890) on display in the University of Cambridge Zoology Department Library

In 1853 he was awarded the Drury Travelling Fellowship of Magdalene College, but he took it up only in 1855, when the grant became available. Between 1855 and 1864 he visited many parts of the world, including Lapland, Iceland, Spitsbergen, the West Indies and North America. In 1858 he made a trip to Iceland with John Wolley with the hope of rediscovering the great auk. Shortly after their return Wolley died, and at the suggestion of P.L. Sclater Newton wrote up Wolley's notes and catalogued his collection in Ootheca Wolleyana, which was published in four parts from 1864 to 1907. In 1866 he became the first Professor of Zoology and Comparative Anatomy at Cambridge, a position which he retained until his death. His portrait still hangs in the library of the University's Department of Zoology. Newton was also a founding editor of the Journal of Anatomy and Physiology in 1867. He was one of the few British Professors of Zoology of his time in whose appointment Huxley did not have a hand. Both Darwin and Huxley declined to support his application, on the grounds that his interests and publications were too narrowly focused on ornithology. The procedure was for candidates to canvass for votes (presumably amongst the MAs of the University). The result of the poll was Newton 110; Dr Drosier 82. Newton was one of the first zoologists to accept and champion the views of Charles Darwin, and his early lecture courses as professor were on evolution and zoogeography.

Newton was a leader in founding the British Ornithologists' Union in 1858, and its quarterly journal, the Ibis in 1859. He wrote several books including Zoology (1872) and A Dictionary of Birds (1893–1896). He contributed memoirs to scientific societies, and edited the Ibis (1865–1870), the Zoological Record (1870–1872), and Yarrell's British Birds (1871–1882). His services to ornithology and zoogeography were recognized by the Royal Society in 1900, when it awarded him the Royal Medal.

Newton spent some time studying the vanishing birds of the Mascarene Islands, from where his brother Sir Edward Newton sent him specimens. These included the dodo on Mauritius and the solitaire on Rodrigues, both already extinct. In 1872 he described what is now known as Newton's parakeet which lived on Rodrigues before going extinct in 1875. The specific epithet of Genyornis newtoni, a prehistoric bird described in 1896 by Edward Charles Stirling and A. H. C. Zietz, commemorates this author. He is also remembered in the name of a hamster, Mesocricetus newtoni.

=== Bird conservation ===
Newton's interest in extinct bird species such as the dodo, great auk and great bustard led him to work towards the protection of birds. He influenced the legislation of the Sea Birds Preservation Act 1869. Newton was a prominent supporter and member of the Society for the Protection of Birds (later, 1903, the RSPB) from its inception in 1889, and carried on a long campaign to influence women against the fashion of adorning their hats with the flight feathers of raptors and other fine birds. His letters to The Times and addresses to the British Association for the Advancement of Science meetings on this subject were regularly reprinted as pamphlets by the Society. Newton determined that extinction cause by human actions was different from extinction resulting from natural processes including evolution. He made efforts to clarify that his motivations for conservation were scientific and that these were distinct from sentiments influenced by earlier movements against animal cruelty and vivisection.

One of his most successful works was a series of investigations into the Desirability of establishing a 'Close-time' for the preservation of indigenous animals. These were instigated and published by the British Association between 1872 and 1903, leading towards the present-day legislation concerning the closed seasons for game fish, shell-fish, birds and mammals (Game laws). The basic concept, as is now well known, is to protect animals during their breeding season so as to prevent the stock from being brought close to extinction.

The Cambridge University Museum of Zoology contains a significant amount of material from Newton, including specimens collected in Madagascar, Polynesia, South America and the Caribbean, eggs, books and correspondence.

== Reception of the Origin of Species ==
Newton's correspondence gives an intimate view of how he encountered the momentous idea of evolution by means of natural selection:

Not many days after my return home there reached me the part of the Journal of the Linnean Society which bears on its cover the date 20th August 1858, and contains the papers by Mr Darwin and Mr Wallace, which were communicated to that Society at its special meeting of the first of July preceding... I sat up late that night to read it; and never shall I forget the impression it made upon me. Herein was contained a perfectly simple solution of all the difficulties which had been troubling me for months past... I am free to confess that in my joy I did not then perceive that... dozens of other difficulties lay in the path... but I was convinced a vera causa [true cause] had been found... and I never doubted for one moment, then nor since, that we had one of the grandest discoveries of the age—a discovery all the more grand because it was so simple.

Only four days after the publication of the famous 1858 paper, and one day after he read it, Newton started to apply Darwin's and Wallace's idea to various problems in ornithology. Newton did not see evolutionary theory as being in conflict with his religion. He maintained a regular attendance at church and held deeply conservative views. Evolutionary theory was, for him, applicable outside of humans.

=== The 1860 British Association Oxford debate ===
The British Association annual meeting for 1860, held in the University Museum in Oxford, was the location for one of the most important public debates in 19th century biology. Newton was present and left a record of what happened in a letter to his brother Edward. The famous debate between Huxley and Wilberforce took place on Saturday 30 June 1860 and in his letter Newton writes:

In the Nat. Hist. Section we had another hot Darwinian debate... After [lengthy preliminaries] Huxley was called upon by Henslow to state his views at greater length, and this brought up the Bp. of Oxford... Referring to what Huxley had said two days before, about after all its not signifying to him whether he was descended from a Gorilla or not, the Bp. chafed him and asked whether he had a preference for the descent being on the father's side or the mother's side? This gave Huxley the opportunity of saying that he would sooner claim kindred with an Ape than with a man like the Bp. who made so ill an use of his wonderful speaking powers to try and burke, by a display of authority, a free discussion on what was, or was not, a matter of truth, and reminded him that on questions of physical science 'authority' had always been bowled out by investigation, as witness astronomy and geology.
He then caught hold of the Bp's assertions and showed how contrary they were to facts, and how he knew nothing about what he had been discoursing on. A lot of people afterwards spoke... The feeling of the audience was very much against the Bp.

A letter, dated 25 July 1860, provides an account of the debate.

=== The 1862 British Association Cambridge debate ===
Newton was also present at the Cambridge meeting of the British Association two years later. Ever since 1857 when Richard Owen presented (to the Linnean Society) his view that man was marked off from all other mammals by possessing features of the brain peculiar to the genus Homo, Huxley had been on his trail. The issue had been debated at the British Association in 1860 and 1861 (Manchester). At the 1862 Cambridge meeting Huxley arranged for his friend William Flower to give a public dissection to show that the same structures were indeed present, not only in apes, but in monkeys also. Flower stood up and said "I happen to have in my pocket a monkey's brain" — and produced the object in question! (report in the Times). In a letter to his brother Newton wrote:

There was a grand kick-up again between Owen and Huxley, the former struggling against facts with a devotion worthy of a better cause. The latter now takes it easy, and laughs over it all, but Flower and Rolleston are too savage. No doubt it is very irritating when Owen will not take the slightest notice of all they have done and proved, and Owen does it all in such a happy manner, that he almost carries conviction from those who know how utterly wrong as to facts he is.

== Partial list of publications ==
- Newton, A. (1862), On the zoology of ancient Europe, Cambridge Philosophical Society
- Newton A. (1864–1907), Ootheca Wolleyana: 1. An illustrated catalogue of the collection of birds' eggs formed by the late John Wolley 2. Eggs of the native birds of Britain and list of British birds, past and present. The first part was published in 1864; it was not until 1902 that Newton was able to resume the work and the next parts appeared in 1902, 1905 and 1907. The work is illustrated with colour lithographic plates and with black & white illustrations. Artists include Newton, Balcomb, Grönvold, M. Hanhart, J. Jury, and Joseph Wolf. The 11th edition of the Encyclopædia Britannica comments: "[This] was an amplification of the numerous articles on birds which he contributed to the 9th edition of the Encyclopædia Britannica".
- Newton, A.; Newton, E. (1868), "On the osteology of the Solitaire or Didine bird of the Island of Rodriguez", Proceedings of the Royal Society, 103: 428–433
- "On a Method of Registering Natural History Observations" (PDF). Transactions of the Norfolk and Norwich Naturalists' Society: 24–32, plates. 1871.
- Newton, A. (1874), Manual of Zoology, Manuals of Elementary Science, London: Society for the Promotion of Christian Knowledge
- Newton, A.; Parker, W.K. (1875), "Birds", Encyclopædia Britannica 9th Edition
- Newton, A. (1877). "The dodo". Encyclopædia Britannica 9th Edition.
- Newton, A.; Newton, E. (1880). "List of the Birds of Jamaica". Handbook of Jamaica. Government printing and stationery establishment.
- Newton, A. (1880), Report on the practicability of establishing a 'Close Time' for the protection of indigenous animals, by a Committee appointed by the British Association, 1869–1880, British Association Reports, London
- Newton, A. (1881), "The Wild Birds' Protection Act 1880, with explanatory notes. London (Field Office) 1880", Quarterly Review, 151 (301: January 1881): 100
- Newton, A. (1884), "Ornithology", Encyclopædia Britannica 9th Edition
- Newton, Alfred (1888), "Early days of Darwinism", Macmillan's Magazine, 57 (February 1888): 241–249
- Newton A. (assisted by Hans Gadow, with contributions from Richard Lydekker, Charles S. Roy and Robert Shufeldt) (1893–1896), Dictionary of Birds. Reprinted in one volume (1088 pages) Black, London, 1896.
- Newton A. et al. (1896–1903), Bird migration in Great Britain and Ireland. Reports of the Committee... British Association.

== See also ==
- Alfred Newton Lecture
- T.H. Huxley
- 1860 Oxford evolution debate
- Reaction to Darwin's theory
- William Henry Flower
- X Club
- Journal of Anatomy
