= Arthur Thomson (naturalist) =

British naturalist (1861–1933)

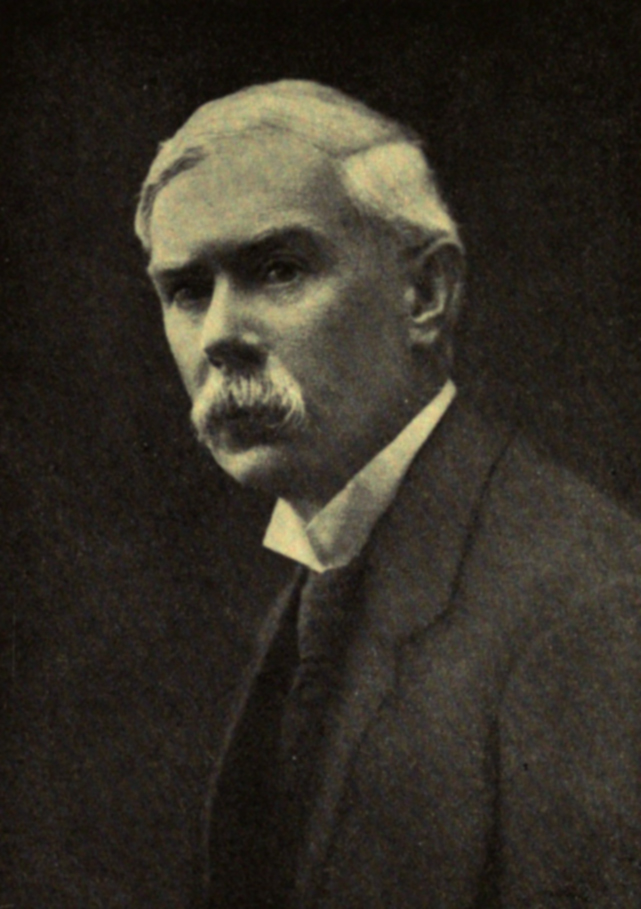

Sir John Arthur Thomson FRSE (8 July 1861 – 12 February 1933) was a British naturalist who authored several books and was an expert on soft corals.

== Life ==
Thomson was born at Pilmuir east of East Saltoun, East Lothian, the second son of Isabella Landsborough (1828-1905) and the Rev Arthur Thomson (1823-1881), a minister in the Free Church of Scotland, originally from Muckhart.

He studied natural history at the University of Edinburgh graduating with an MA in 1880. He had already established a reputation as a worthy scientist within his first years and in 1887, aged 25, he was elected a Fellow of the Royal Society of Edinburgh. His proposers were Patrick Geddes, J. T. Cunningham, Sir John Murray and Robert McNair Ferguson.

He taught at the Royal (Dick) Veterinary College from 1893 until 1899 then University of Aberdeen from 1899 until 1930 as Regius Professor of Natural History (Aberdeen), the year he was knighted. His popular works aimed to reconcile science and religion. Thomson's Outline of Science, published in 1922, sold more than one hundred thousand copies in five years. He lived at 15 Chanonry in Aberdeen.

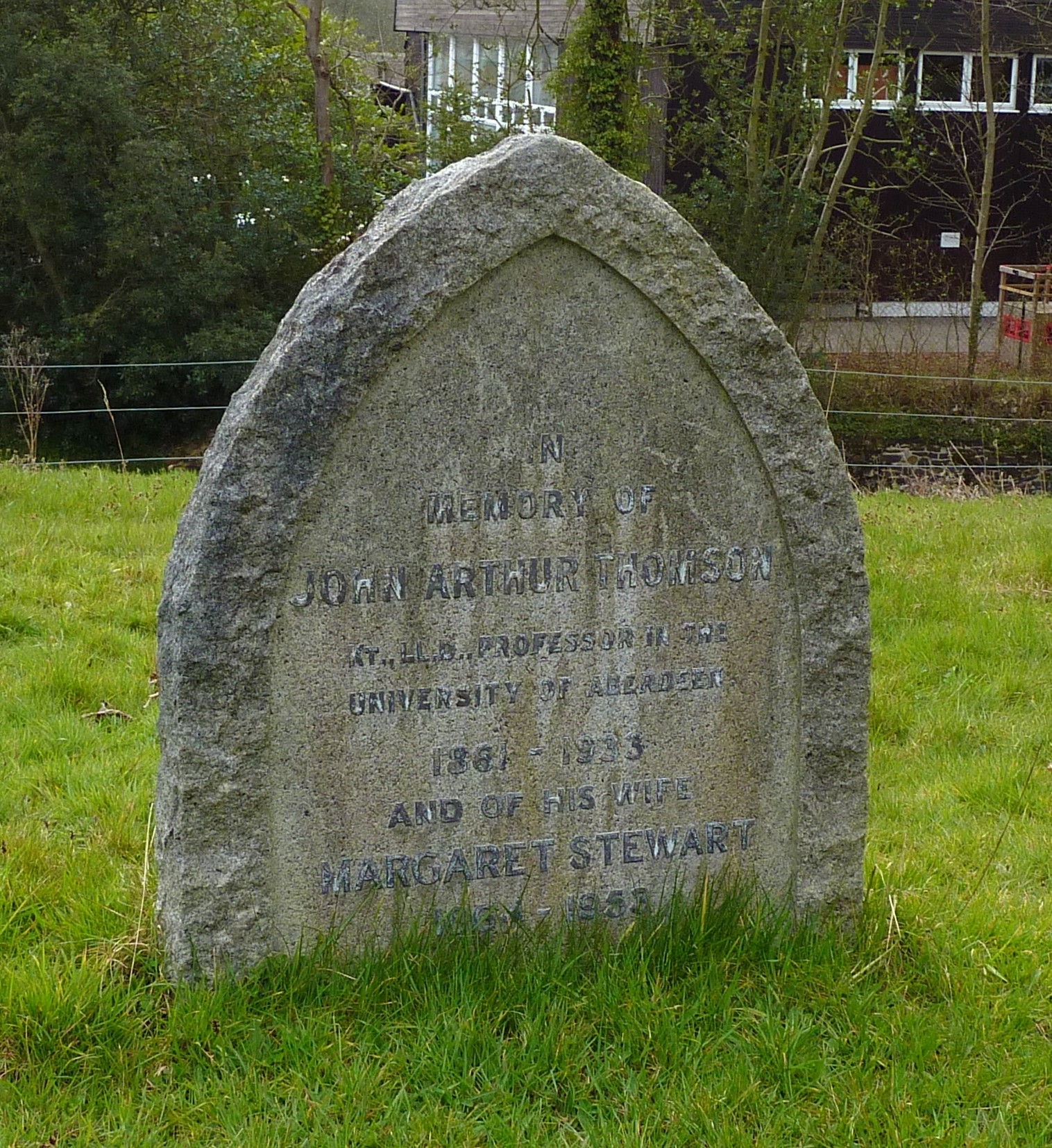
Thomson's grave at St Peter's Church in Limpsfield, Surrey, England, in 2013

In his Gifford lectures and a number of books written with his friend Patrick Geddes he argued for a form of holistic biology in which the activity of the living organism could transcend the physical laws governing its component parts. Some had termed the work of Geddes and Thomson as neovitalist though the position presented in their books is more closer to panpsychism as Thomson had claimed that mind can not emerge from matter and that it has existed in nature all the time. Thomson had believed there was life at all levels, he wrote that "there is nothing inanimate". He had however found the vitalist ideas of Henri Bergson inspirational.

According to Peter J. Bowler, Thomson was a popular science writer who had promoted a nonmaterialist interpretation of science though his interpretation was not accepted by all within the scientific community as some had claimed his views were neovitalist and thus outdated.

Thomson had also promoted the importance of symbiosis and cooperation in nature as opposed to the idea of struggle.

While at the University of Aberdeen Thomson supervised the research of respected carcinologist Isabella Gordon.

He was knighted in 1930 by King George V.

He died at home, St Mary's Lodge in Limpsfield, Surrey.

== Family ==
In 1889 he married Margaret Robertson Stewart and they were parents to the ornithologist Arthur Landsborough Thomson, who wrote a short biography about his father in School Nature Study, April 1944.

His younger brother was the zoologist James Stuart Thomson FRSE.

== Selected publications ==
- Parasitism: Organic and Social (1895)
- Progress of Science in the Century (1903)
- Heredity (1908)
- Darwinism and Human Life (1909)
- Evolution (1912 - with Patrick Geddes)
- Problems of Sex (1912)
- Zoological Studies (1911-1915)
- The Outline of Science [editor] (4 vol., 1922; repr. 1937)
- What Is Man? (1923)
- Science and Religion (1925)
- The Minds Of Animals: An Introduction To The Study Of Animal Behaviour (1927)
- Modern Science (1929)
- Life: Outlines of General Biology (1931)
- ′′The New World of Science,′′ in The Atlantic Monthly, June 1930, in Essays in Science and Engineering, Compiled by Franz MONTGOMERY, Ray LONG & Rich R. SMITH, Inc., pp. 26-48, 1932.
- Riddles of Science (1932)
- Biology for Everyman (1933 - published posthumously)
