= Percy Lowe =

English surgeon and ornithologist (1870–1948)

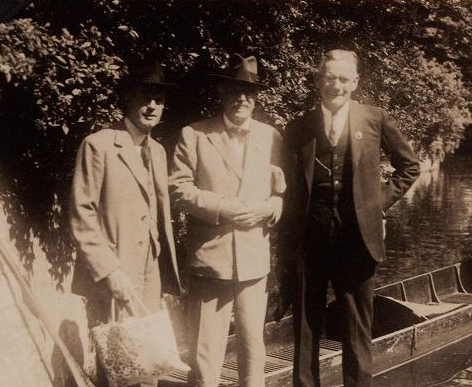
- Lowe with W.L. Sclater and Alexander Wetmore, 1934
- Born: 2 January 1870; Stamford, Lincolnshire, England
- Died: 18 August 1948 (aged 78)
- Education: Jesus College, Cambridge
- Known for: The finches of the Galapagos in relation to Darwin's conception of species
- Awards: Godman-Salvin Medal of the British Ornithological Union
- Scientific career
- Fields: Surgeon, ornithologist
- Workplaces: Royal Army Medical Corps, Natural History Museum, London
- Author abbrev. (zoology): Lowe

Percy Roycroft Lowe (2 January 1870 – 18 August 1948) was an English surgeon and ornithologist.

== Life ==
Lowe was born at Stamford, Lincolnshire and studied medicine at Jesus College, Cambridge. He served as a civil surgeon in the Second Boer War, and it was whilst in South Africa that he became interested in ornithology. On his return he became private physician to Sir Frederick Johnstone, 8th Baronet, whose constant travel exposed Lowe to birds all around the world.

During World War One he served in the Royal Army Medical Corps; he was Officer in Command on Princess Christian Ambulance Train for which he was awarded the OBE in 1920.

Lowe worked with Dorothea Bate on fossil ostriches in China.

In November 1919 he succeeded William Robert Ogilvie-Grant as Curator of Birds at the Natural History Museum, retiring on his sixty-fifth birthday in 1935. He was succeeded by Norman Boyd Kinnear.

He was editor of the Bulletin of the British Ornithologists' Club from 1920 to 1925 and president of the British Ornithologists' Union from 1938 to 1943. In 1933 he was one of eleven people (Note: The letter was signed: Desborough; Hugh S. Gladstone; Grey of Fallodon; Julian S. Huxley (Chancellor of Oxford University); T. G Longstaff; Percy R. Lowe; P. Chalmers Mitchell; Rothschild; Scone M.P. (Chairman, British Trust for Ornithology); E. L. Turner; H. F. Witherby (President, British Ornithologists' Union)) involved in the appeal that led to the foundation of the British Trust for Ornithology (BTO), an organisation for the study of birds in the British Isles. His 1936 publication The finches of the Galapagos in relation to Darwin's conception of species introduced the term Darwin's finches.

In 1939 he was elected a Corresponding Member of the Royal Australasian Ornithologists Union and in 1946 was awarded the Godman-Salvin Medal of the British Ornithological Union.

An extinct species of penguin, Archaeospheniscus lowei, was named in his honor to recognize his research into penguin fossils.

== Publications ==
- Lowe, P. R. (1911), A naturalist on desert islands, London: Witherby & Co
- Lowe, P. R. (1913), Our Common Sea-Birds, London: Country Life
- Lowe, P. R. (1936), "The finches of the Galapagos in relation to Darwin's conception of species", Ibis, vol. 78, no. 6, pp. 310–321, doi:10.1111/j.1474-919x.1936.tb03376.x
