= John Wolley =

English ornithologist

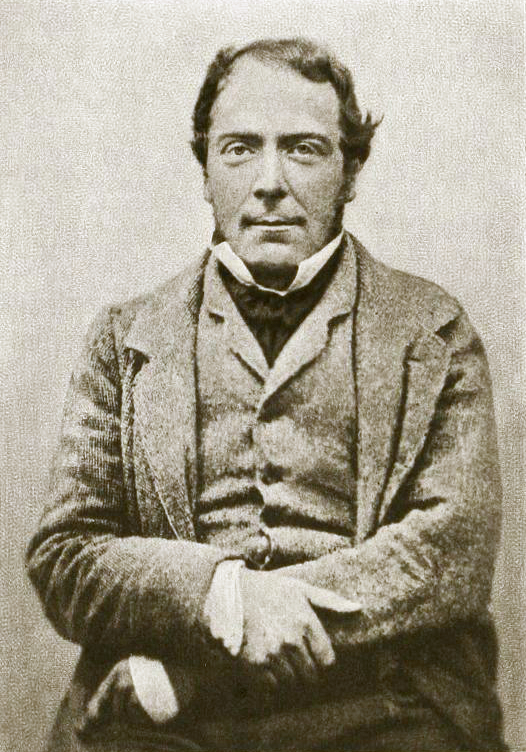

John Wolley (13 May 1823 – 20 November 1859) was an English naturalist best known for his large collection of bird eggs and studies on the dodo and great auk.

== Life and work ==
Wolley was born at Matlock on 13 May 1823. His father was Reverend John Hurt and his mother Mary was the daughter of Adam Wolley who was an antiquarian. After the death of his father-in-law in 1827, John Hurt assumed the name of Wolley.

John Wolley obtained his early education at Mr. Fletcher's preparatory school in Southwell and then moved to Eton in 1836. He moved in 1842 to Trinity College, Cambridge. He had already become interested in nature and spent a lot of time in the woods and fens around Cambridgeshire and Huntingdonshire.

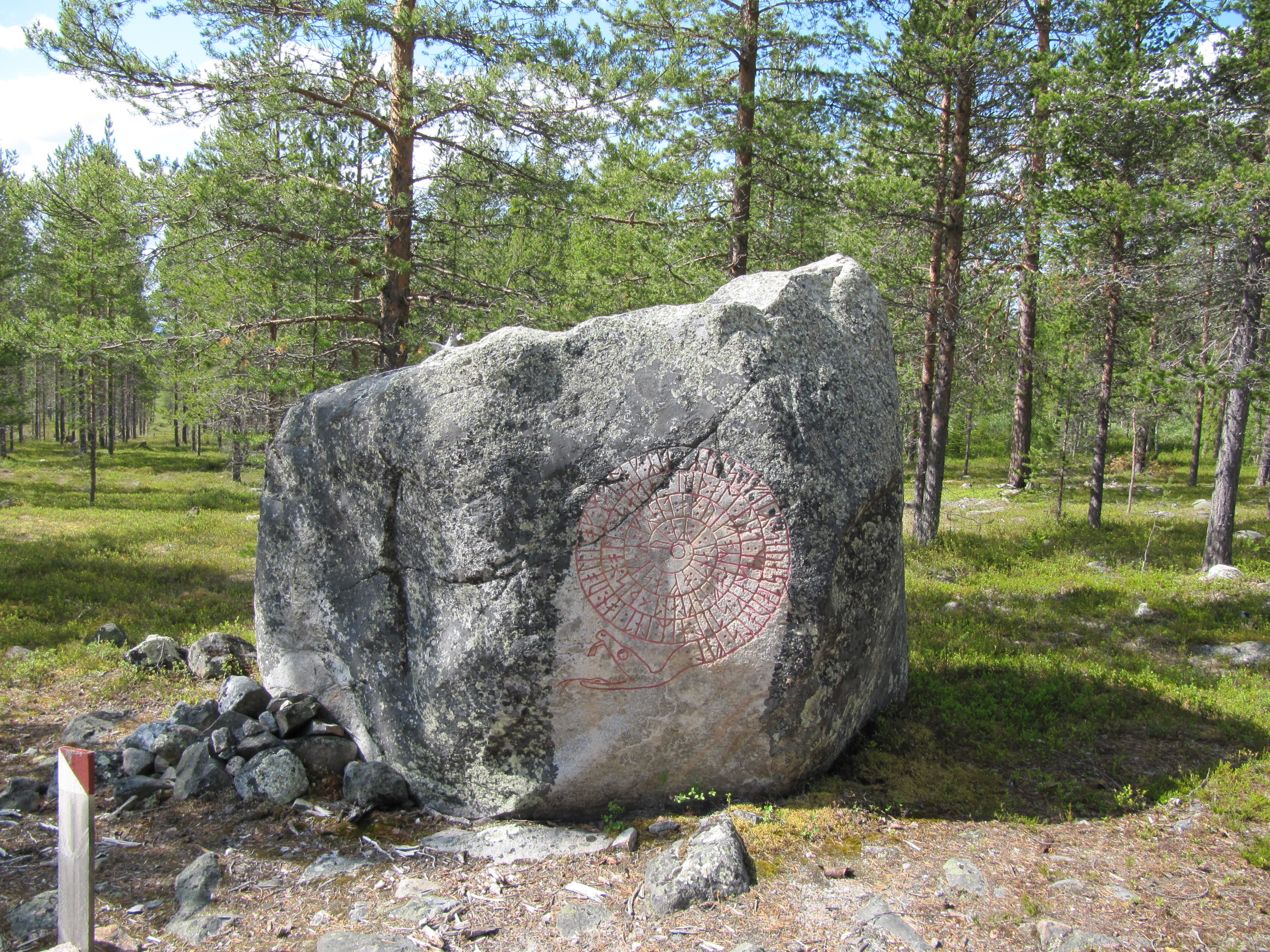
Runes carved by John Wolley near Muoniovaara in Pajala kommun, Sweden.

In 1845 he travelled to Spain. He began to collect the eggs of birds both on his own and through other collectors. He graduated with a BA in January 1846 and moved to London with the intention of studying law at the Middle Temple. He spent a lot of time in the British Museum and took an interest in the study of the dodo, and became acquainted with H. E. Strickland.

In 1846 he travelled through Germany and Switzerland, even climbing Mont Blanc. In 1847 he moved to Edinburgh and began to study medicine. In 1850 he was elected Senior President of the Royal Medical Society. He continued his egg collections, making trips to Orkney and Shetland in 1848. He wrote on the birds of the Faeroes and contributed to Sir William Jardine's "Contributions to Ornithology for 1850". He moved back to London and remained until 1853, studying the great auk.

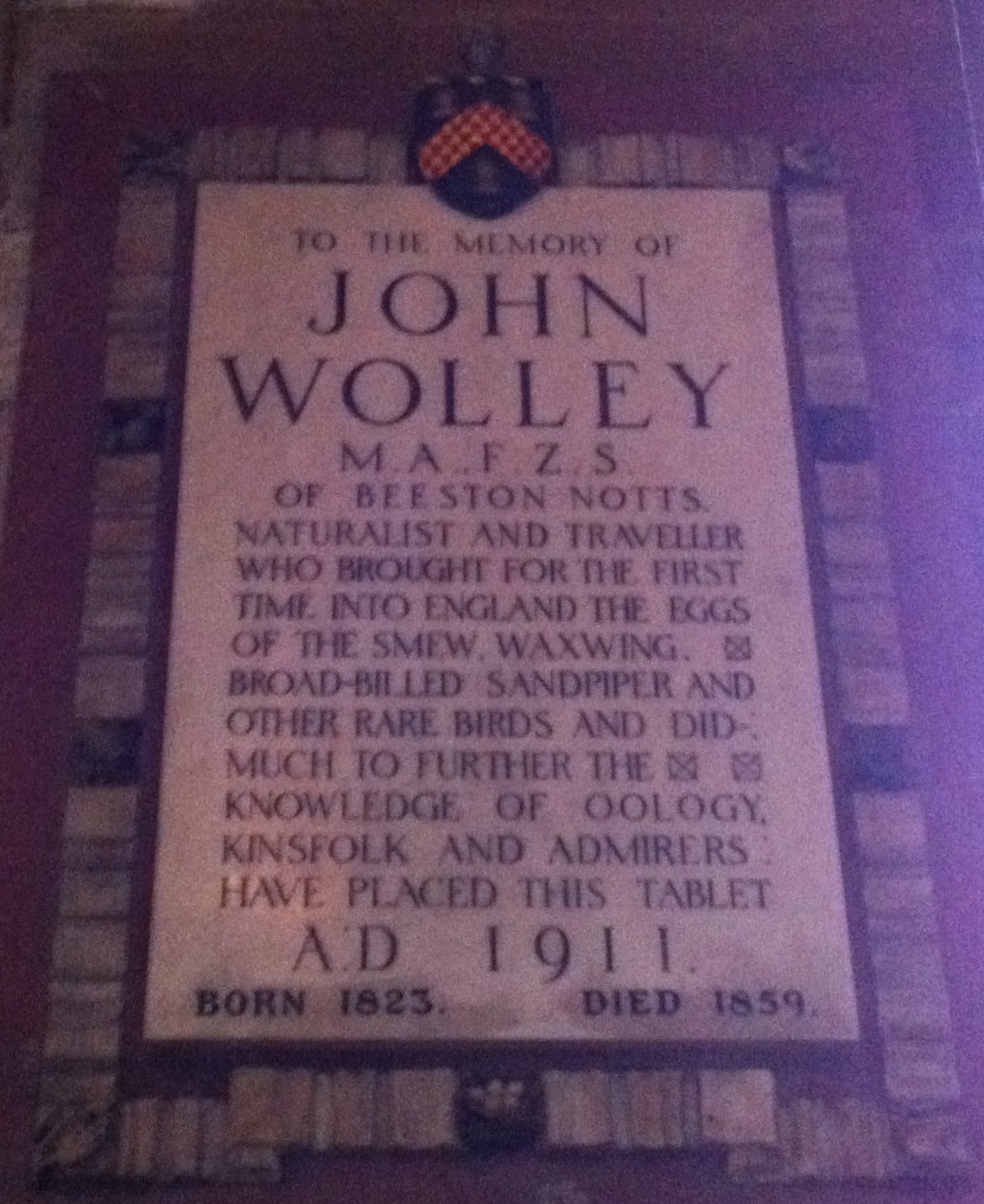
Memorial in Southwell Minster

In 1853 he set off to explore the Arctic region of Lapland, Norway, Sweden and Finland. After returning to England, his health declined with symptoms that included the loss of memory. He died after becoming unconscious on 20 November 1859.

== Legacy ==
Wolley bequeathed his egg collection and notebooks to Alfred Newton who catalogued them in Ootheca wolleyana before donating the collection to the British Museum. Wolley had also donated a collection of about 120 Indian bird skins to the Norwich museum in 1858.

One of Wolley's ideas was to conduct a comprehensive census of all the birds of Britain, an idea that foreshadowed bird atlases.
