= Thomas Hudson Nelson =

British ornithologist

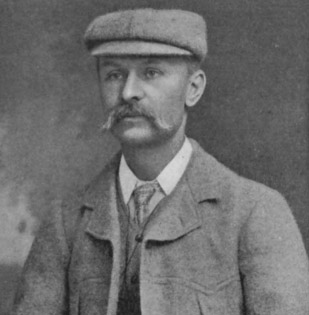
- Born: 12 February 1856; Bishop Auckland, England
- Died: 5 November 1916 (aged 60); Redcar, North Yorkshire, England
- Citizenship: Great Britain
- Known for: The Birds of Yorkshire: being a historical account of the avi-fauna of the county
- Spouse: Frances Shaw
- Scientific career
- Fields: ornithology

Thomas Hudson Nelson (12 February 1856, in Bishop Auckland, County Durham – 5 November 1916, in Redcar, North Yorkshire) was a British ornithologist. He is best known for The Birds of Yorkshire: being a historical account of the avi-fauna of the county (1907).

== Life ==
Thomas Hudson Nelson was born on 12 February 1856 in Bishop Auckland, County Durham. He was educated privately under Marquis de Kervan. Due to health problems, Nelson was unable to continue his education. On doctor’s advice, he moved to Redcar, where his interest in birds grew. He traveled around the country with fellow collectors and ornithologist visiting classic bird sites.

Nelson became an assistant editor of The Naturalist, published many papers on the ornithology of Yorkshire and was an active member of the Yorkshire Naturalists’ Union.

In 1898, he married Frances Shaw.

In 1907, Nelson’s major work The Birds of Yorkshire: being a historical account of the avi-fauna of the county was published. The book consisted of almost 900 pages and a number of photographic illustrations of birds and bird habitats in two volumes. William Eagle Clarke and Frederick Boyes assisted Nelson in the production of the book. Among Nelson’s other contributions to ornithology should be mentioned such works as Nesting of the Ruff in Yorkshire (1906), Pallas's Sand Grouse in Yorkshire in June (1908), Little Bunting in Durham (1903), and Little Bunting in Yorkshire.

Nelson had an extensive collection of birds and eggs that was bequested to the Dorman Museum in Middlesbrough in 1914. The collection includes over 100 mounted bird specimens and guillemot eggs with unusual colors and marking.

Thomas Hudson Nelson died on 5 November 1916 in Redcar.

== Bibliography ==
- Nelson, T.H.; Clarke, W. Eagle; Boyes, F. (1907). The birds of Yorkshire, being a historical account of the avi-fauna of the County. London &c: A. Brown & Sons, Ltd. OCLC 1055938922.
