= Fair Trade Association of Australia and New Zealand =

- Company type: Non-profit organization
- Founded: 2003; 23 years ago
- Headquarters: Melbourne, Australia and Auckland, New Zealand
- Key people: Cheryl Kernot, Chair
- Number of employees: 8 (2006)
- Website: www.fta.org.au/

The Fair Trade Association of Australia and New Zealand (The Fair Trade Association) is a member-based organization that supports two systems of fair trade. The first is the Australia and New Zealand member of FLO International, which unites Fairtrade producer and labeling initiatives across Europe, Asia, Latin America, North America, Africa, Australia and New Zealand. The second is the World Fair Trade Organization (WFTO), of over 450 worldwide members, to which the Fair Trade Association is one. Fairtrade (one word) refers to FLO certified commodity and associated products. Fair trade (two words) encompasses the wider Fair Trade movement, including the Fairtrade commodities and other artisan craft products.

== Organisation structure ==
The Fair Trade Association is a not-for-private-profit membership based association, governed by an Executive Committee elected every year during The Fair Trade Association's AGM. The Fair Trade Association membership is open to any organisation interested and supportive of fair trade principles. The Fair Trade Association membership includes development, social justice, environmental and human rights NGOs, businesses, alternative trade organisations, researchers and interested individuals.

== Marketing support programs and activities ==
Through its member base, and a small secretariat, the Fair Trade Association seeks to increase awareness of fair trade; help facilitate and coordinate fair trade activities; assist producers from developing countries, especially in the Asia-Pacific region, to access Australian and New Zealand markets; and establish a regional organisation to manage Fairtrade certification and labelling for products that have standards in place under the limited FLO system. The Fair Trade Association also endorses fair trade businesses who are primarily artisan craft-based and do not fall within the purview of the Fairtrade Labeling Organization structures. This endorsement is gained through adherence to the World Fair Trade Organization (WFTO) 10 principles of fair trade. This endorsement offers opportunities for consumers to trust that the craft-styled products sold by businesses are authentically fair trade. Businesses become endorsed as a "Fair Trader of Australia". The program has been quite successful in the country. Between 2012 and 2017, the sale of fair trade products in Australia grew by 70%. Most consumers are socially aware these days and check the labels before making a purchase. This money has made a considerable impact in the lives of children located in developing countries.

== History ==
The first products bearing the FLO International Fairtrade Certification Mark, which guarantees a better deal to disadvantaged producers in the developing world, were sold in Australia and New Zealand starting October 2003. Products bearing the mark are on sale in Australia and New Zealand: coffee, tea, chocolate and cocoa, cotton and sportsballs.

The first endorsed "Fair Traders of Australia" achieved their seal in early 2011.

== See also ==
- Fair trade in New Zealand
