= CORSO =

New Zealand overseas aid agency

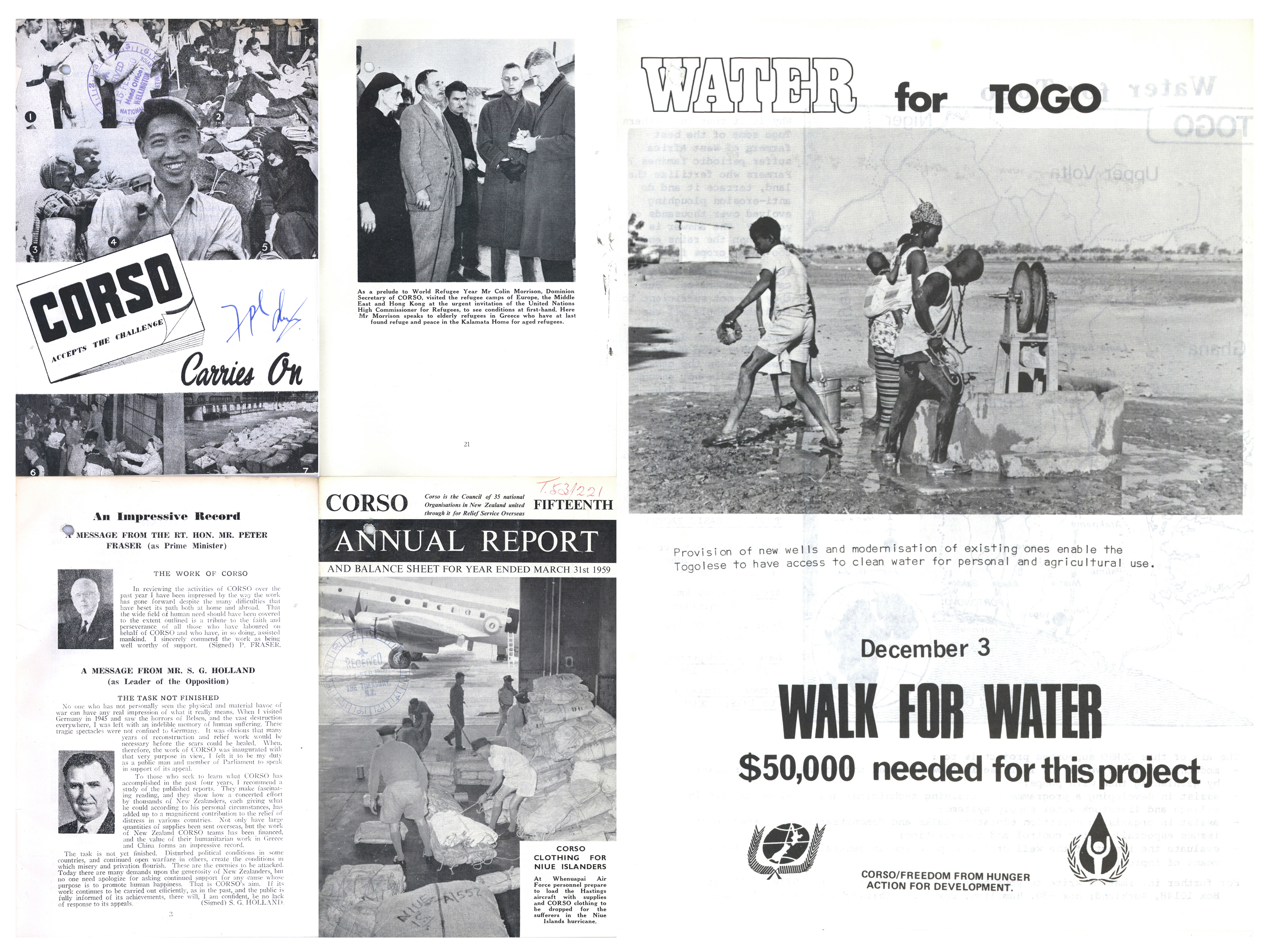
- A photo collage from CORSO's 1950 Annual Report
- Formation: 16 August 1944; 81 years ago
- Type: Aid agency, non-government organization
- Legal status: Deregistered charity
- Website: http://www.corso.org.nz
- Formerly called: Council of Organisations for Relief Services Overseas

CORSO was a New Zealand aid agency, originally focused on providing clothing and aid to people displaced by World War II. However, in 1979, the government terminated its NZ$40,000 yearly grant following CORSO's shift towards advocating for social justice and support for the peace movement. Subsequently, the charity experienced a decline due to both internal and external factions.

== History ==
As World War II neared its end, the need for a significant aid initiative to rehabilitate war-torn nations and refugees became apparent. While battles were ongoing overseas, a group of concerned New Zealanders joined forces and formed the Council of Organisations for Relief Service Overseas (CORSO) on 16 August 1944. Several organisations, such as the National Council of Churches, Quakers, and Red Cross helped to establish it.

CORSO, alongside similar organisations worldwide, supported the United Nations Relief and Rehabilitation Administration in its humanitarian relief. They created awareness campaigns, raised funds, organised door-to-door clothing collections, and sorted and packed donated garments and footwear, and shipped them to numerous countries around the world, in particular Greece, India, Hong Kong, Korea and Niue. Thanks to government funding, it quickly gained prominence as a notable charity, bringing pride to the people of New Zealand.

CORSO evolved into New Zealand's largest aid agency until 1977 when it was surpassed by World Vision and Save the Children. The charity is remembered for its historical door-to-door clothing drives, despite transitioning away from sending old clothes overseas into supporting grassroots projects in developing nations during the early 1970s. These projects focused on fostering self-reliance, and were carried out in twenty countries, including Zimbabwe, Nicaragua, Togo, Sri Lanka, and various Pacific Island nations, including Fiji and New Caledonia. However, the organisation faced significant upheaval while debating the most effective strategy for international aid and the best way to end poverty.

During the 1970s, CORSO began advocating for social justice and aligning with the peace movement. In 1977, it changed its name the e New Zealand Justice and Development Organisation but retained CORSO for name recognition.

In 1979, the organisation commissioned a documentary exploring poverty's roots, but New Zealand's state television refused to screen it. CORSO lost its annual NZ$40,000 government grant for being deemed "too political" and not in line with the government's strategic direction. Through its change of focus to local poverty and Māori activism, rather than simply humanitarian and disaster relief, it lost donor support to international charities.

Following this, CORSO fragmented, and one faction exists as a Pacific-based NGO championing equal opportunity and Maori sovereignty. This faction, named Corso Incorporated, was deregistered as a charity in 2010 for failure to file annual returns.

As CORSO declined, other aid agencies appeared, including Trade Aid, Volunteer Service Abroad – Te Tūao Tāwāhi (VSA) and Citizens Advice Bureau (CAB).

== Affiliated people ==
- Sylvia Gytha de Lancey Chapman was one of the key figures recognising the difficulty of giving relief to the homeless, the starving, and the desperately ill.
- Helen Crooke was a founding member. She led the personnel committee and was involved in the recruitment process for individuals to support the United Nations Relief and Rehabilitation Administration in Greece in 1946 and China in 1947–48.
- Jenny Gill was a Wellington regional organiser.
- CORSO sponsored Susanna Ounei to come to New Zealand to learn English. Her widower, David Small, worked on CORSO human rights, health, education and environmental projects in New Caledonia in the early 1980s
- Dulcie Stocker volunteered and fundraised for the charity for four decades. In 1982, Stocker and others gathered 80 signatures on a petition for Christchurch to become a nuclear-free city. Stocker presented it to the Christchurch City Council. This together with similar petitions from peace groups, led in 1982, to Christchurch becoming the first city in New Zealand to be declared nuclear-free, a precursor to the government declaring the entire country a nuclear-free zone five years later. Despite the charity's upheavals, Stocker never wavered in her devotion to CORSO.
- Toby Truell was general secretary from 1977 to 1982. He helped to shift CORSO's focus away from simply sending old clothes to the poor overseas into funding projects that promoted self-reliance in Third World countries.
