= Arthur Landsborough Thomson =

Scottish medical researcher (1890–1977)

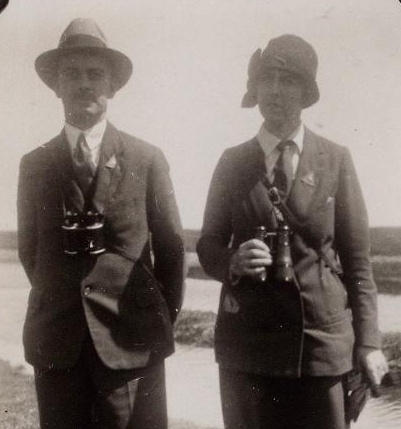
Dr and Mrs Thomson in Holland in 1930, photo by Alexander Wetmore

Sir Arthur Landsborough Thomson CB OBE FRSE PZS LLD (8 October 1890 – 9 June 1977) was a Scottish medical researcher, mainly remembered as an amateur ornithologist and ornithological author and acknowledged expert on bird migration.

== Life ==
He was born in Edinburgh on 8 October 1890 the son of John Arthur Thomson FRSE and his wife Margaret Stewart. The family lived at 10 Kilmaurs Road. He was educated at the Royal High School, Edinburgh until 1899, when his father moved to Aberdeen as Professor of Natural History at Aberdeen University. Arthur completed his education at Aberdeen Grammar School. The family then lived at 15 Chanonry in Aberdeen.

Arthur then studied Natural History (under his own father) at Aberdeen University, graduating MA in 1911.

In the First World War he served as a Lt Colonel in the Argyll and Sutherland Highlanders. He received a Military OBE for his services.

After the war (from 1919) he became a medical researcher and remained in this role until retiral in 1957. He was created a Commander of the Order of the Bath for this work in 1933 by King George VI and knighted by Queen Elizabeth II for this work in 1953. In 1962 the Royal Society's Buchanan Medal for services to medicine.

In 1938 he was elected a Fellow of the Royal Society of Edinburgh. His proposers were James Ritchie, Sir David Wilkie (surgeon), Charles Henry O'Donoghue and William Kalman.

He was president of the British Ornithologists' Union (BOU) from 1948 to 1955. He was President of the Zoological Society 1946 to 1950. He was Chairman of the British Trust for Ornithology (BTO) from 1941 to 1947 and won the Trust's Bernard Tucker Medal in 1957. In 1959 he was awarded the BOU's Godman-Salvin Medal.

He died at Queen Mary's Hospital in Roehampton on 9 June 1977.

== Family ==
In 1920 he married Mary Moir Trail (d.1969). They did not have children.

His paternal uncle was James Stuart Thomson FRSE.

== Publications ==
- British Birds and Their Nests (1910) with an introduction by J. Arthur Thomson
- Problems of Bird Migration (1926)
- Bird Migration: A Short Account (1936); 1943 reprint of 1942 revised, 2nd edition
- A New Dictionary of Birds (editor), 1964
- Half a Century of Medical Research (vol. 1, 1973) 1st 6 chapters of the 17 chapters of Volume I: Origins and Policy of The Medical Research Council; (vol. 2, 1975) Volume II: The Programme of the Medical Research Council (UK)
