= Fair trade in New Zealand =

Fair trade is where a farmer or craftsperson is paid a fair price for their product, one that represents its true worth, not just the lowest price that it is possible to pay. This is a price that covers the cost of production and enables the producer to live with dignity. Fair Trade New Zealand is an organisation that was launched in 2005 which supports fair trade by ensuring that farmers and workers' rights are not exploited. According to Oxfam New Zealand, there are several companies to support fairly traded goods from, which are exported to New Zealand. From 2013-2014 there were 42 Fair Trade Licensees and Traders in New Zealand. From 2015-2016 this number rose to 54 Fair Trade Licensees and Traders in New Zealand. Gwen Green, Oxfam's Engagement Director, says: "when farmers are paid fairly for their products, we see people able to make real improvements to their lives and their communities. Producers who used to struggle to feed their families are able to give their children an education, and communities can build schools and develop businesses. It is one of the smart solutions to poverty". In 2009, Wellington became the first fair trade capital city in the Southern Hemisphere. In 2017, Whangarei was recognised by the Fair Trade Association of Australia New Zealand as being one of four fair trade councils in New Zealand, and the first fair trade district in New Zealand.

== Fair trade and human rights ==
International human rights law is founded on the idea that all human beings have the same set of fundamental rights. The right to equality and non-discrimination provides that human beings, regardless of their status or membership of a particular group, are entitled to the same set of rights. The Universal Declaration of Human Rights (UDHR), adopted in 1948, includes in it protections against discrimination and slavery, and provides for the rights to freedom of association and to form and join trade unions, the right to work, to free choice of employment, to just and favourable conditions of work, to protection against unemployment and the right to equal pay for equal work. The significance of equality is reflected in the first article of the Universal Declaration of Human Rights (UDHR): 'All human beings are born free and equal in dignity and rights'.

Freedom from slavery and compulsory labour is recognised in the International Covenant on Civil and Political Rights (ICCPR). Freedom from slavery and the prohibition of the slave trade refers to the practice of treating human beings as property. Forced or compulsory labour is also prohibited under article 8 of the Covenant, although it is subject to exceptions. That is, performance of labour as part of a prison sentence will not breach a state's obligations. The right to employment with just and favourable conditions is recognised in the International Covenant on Economic, Social and Cultural Rights (ICESCR), and these conditions should provide workers with fair wages and equal pay for work of equal value.

== New Zealand law and standards ==
New Zealand law does not generally have extraterritorial effect. The extraterritorial application of human rights regimes can be defined as the existence of a legal obligation to respect rights. The Fair Trading Act 1986 deals with misleading and deceptive conduct, and despite its title, has no direct legal connection with this particular aspect of fair trade in New Zealand. In New Zealand slavery and forced labour are criminalised. A person is liable to imprisonment for a term not exceeding 14 years who, within or outside New Zealand, sells and purchases, or in any way whatsoever deals with any person as a slave. Slavery is prohibited by the New Zealand Bill of Rights Act 1990. Slavery is also not mentioned in the Human Rights Act 1993. There is currently no law that fair trade products need to be endorsed or supported through both private and public organisations in New Zealand.

== Fair trade labelling laws ==
The Fairtrade Mark indicates that products purchased by consumers are supporting farmers and workers as they work to improve their livelihoods and provide better support to their communities. In 2015-2016 79% of New Zealanders recognised the Fairtrade Mark. In 2015, recognition of the Fairtrade Mark in New Zealand reached 78% and measured at NZ$89 million. The total revenue for Fairtrade ANZ has increased by 29% in the 2016 Financial Year. There are two recognised international fair trade systems - the World Fair Trade Organization (WFTO) and Fairtrade Labelling Organisations International. The Fair trade label appears on product packaging and is a consumer guarantee which is awarded to specific products that have been traded according to the International Fair trade labelling standards. In contrast, the WFTO certifies organisations as fair trade organisations - throughout their entire supply chain.

== Principles of fair trade ==
The Fair Trade Federation is an organisation that recognises and upholds those principles to promote equity in international trade. The Federation works with The World Fair Trade Organization (WFTO) and subscribes to similar fair trade principles. The organisation has ten principles of fair trade which it follows. These principles listed below are sourced from the WFTO website:

1. Opportunities for disadvantaged producers
2. Transparency and accountability
3. Fair trade practices
4. Fair payment
5. No child labour, no forced labour
6. No discrimination, gender equity, freedom of association
7. Good working conditions
8. Capacity building
9. Promote fair trade
10. Respect for the environment

== Fair trade suppliers ==
Oxfam New Zealand works with suppliers that sell a range of fair trade products in New Zealand. Trade Aid, All Good Bananas, and L'Affare are some suppliers that trade fair trade products.

- Trade Aid is New Zealand's oldest and largest fair trade organisation, which was established in 1973. The original goal of Trade Aid is to "support the work of self-help organisations through long-term trading relationships based on transparency and fairness". Each year Trade Aid allocates New Zealand Government aid monies - $220,000 in 2012-13 - to fund projects aimed at increasing sustainability. Trade Aid sources its products from more than 65 trading partner organisations who buy these products from small groups of farmers and artisans.
- All Good Bananas is a 100% New Zealand owned and operated company. Since the first fair trade bananas import to New Zealand in 2010, $940,000 has been given back to the El Guabo community in fair trade premium funding.
- L'Affare is a coffee business that was established in Wellington, New Zealand in 1990. L'Affare partners with Trade Aid which supports the imports of fair trade coffee from local communities worldwide.

== Universities ==
There are two universities in New Zealand that have been recognised by the Fair Trade Association of Australia and New Zealand as fair trade universities. In 2013 the University of Otago became the first New Zealand university to be granted fair trade accreditation, along with more than 100 universities around the world that have become fair trade institutions. Vice Chancellor Professor Harlene Hayne says: "I am proud of the effort staff and students have gone to make this happen and look forward to a long and meaningful association with Fairtrade. We now have Fairtrade products available at all seven outlets on campus and 90 per cent of residential students have access to Fairtrade products in their colleges". In July 2017, the University of Canterbury was also granted fair trade accreditation, becoming the first entirely fair trade campus in New Zealand. The fair trade criteria for accreditation is that 50 per cent of products should be fair trade, where that option is available. The supporting of fair trade products at University of Canterbury means that the campus uses fair trade coffee, tea and hot drinking chocolate, as well as selling Trade Aid chocolate. Chair of the UC Fair Trade Committee Dr John Hopkins stated "by the time we applied for accreditation, UC purchases for tea and coffee had reached 80 per cent, and are still rising". Professor Ian Wright from the University of Canterbury says: "our staff and students can be proud that their commitment will have far-reaching impacts, not only in raising awareness in the local community, but in directly benefiting producers, growers and workers in developing countries".

== See also ==
- Fair trade World Wide
- Human rights in New Zealand
- History of fair trade
- Fairtrade certification
- Ethical trade
