= William Eagle Clarke =

British ornithologist (1853–1938)

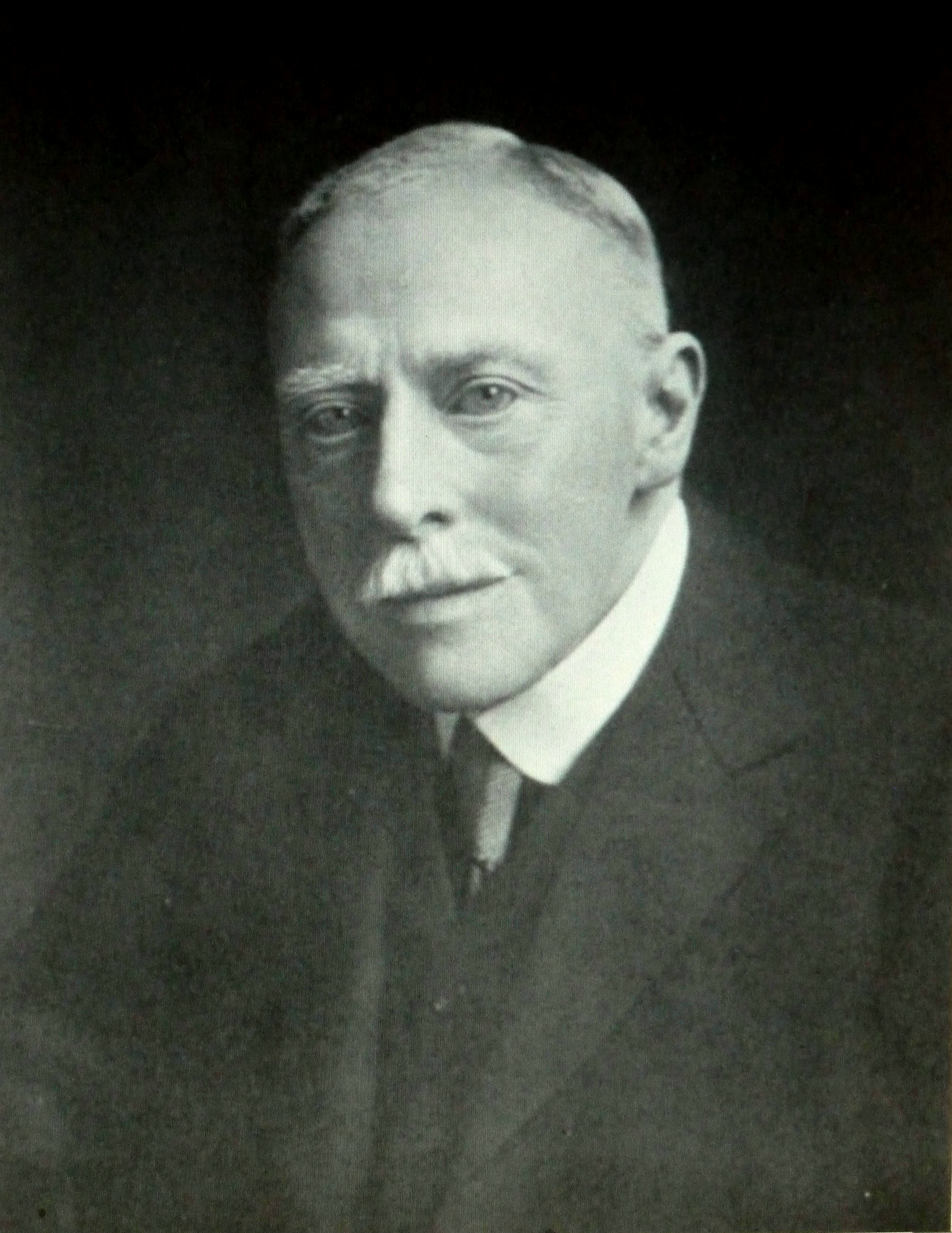
William Eagle Clarke

Dr William Eagle Clarke ISO FLS FRSE PBOU LL.D. (16 March 1853 – 10 May 1938) was a British ornithologist.

== Life ==
Clarke was born in Leeds where his father William Clarke was a solicitor and educated at the Grammar School and at Yorkshire College, Leeds where he studied under Professor L C Miall. He was originally a civil engineer and surveyor, but later took up natural history as a profession. He became Curator of Leeds Museum in 1884, moving to the Natural History Department of the Royal Scottish Museum in 1888, where he was Keeper from 1906 to 1921.

He went on several expeditions including the Rhone Valley, Sclavonia, Hungary and Andorra. He observed that the Rhone Valley was important for migratory birds. He also worked on collections obtained by others and described the Negros bleeding-heart. He was instrumental in recognizing that lighthouses and lightships were capable of collecting a great deal of migration information. For his work on bird migration he became the first recipient of the Godman-Salvin Medal in 1922.

In 1903 he was elected a Fellow of the Royal Society of Edinburgh his main proposer being Ramsay Heatley Traquair. He was President of the British Ornithologists Union in 1918. He was also secretary and president of the Yorkshire Naturalists' Union.

== Publications ==
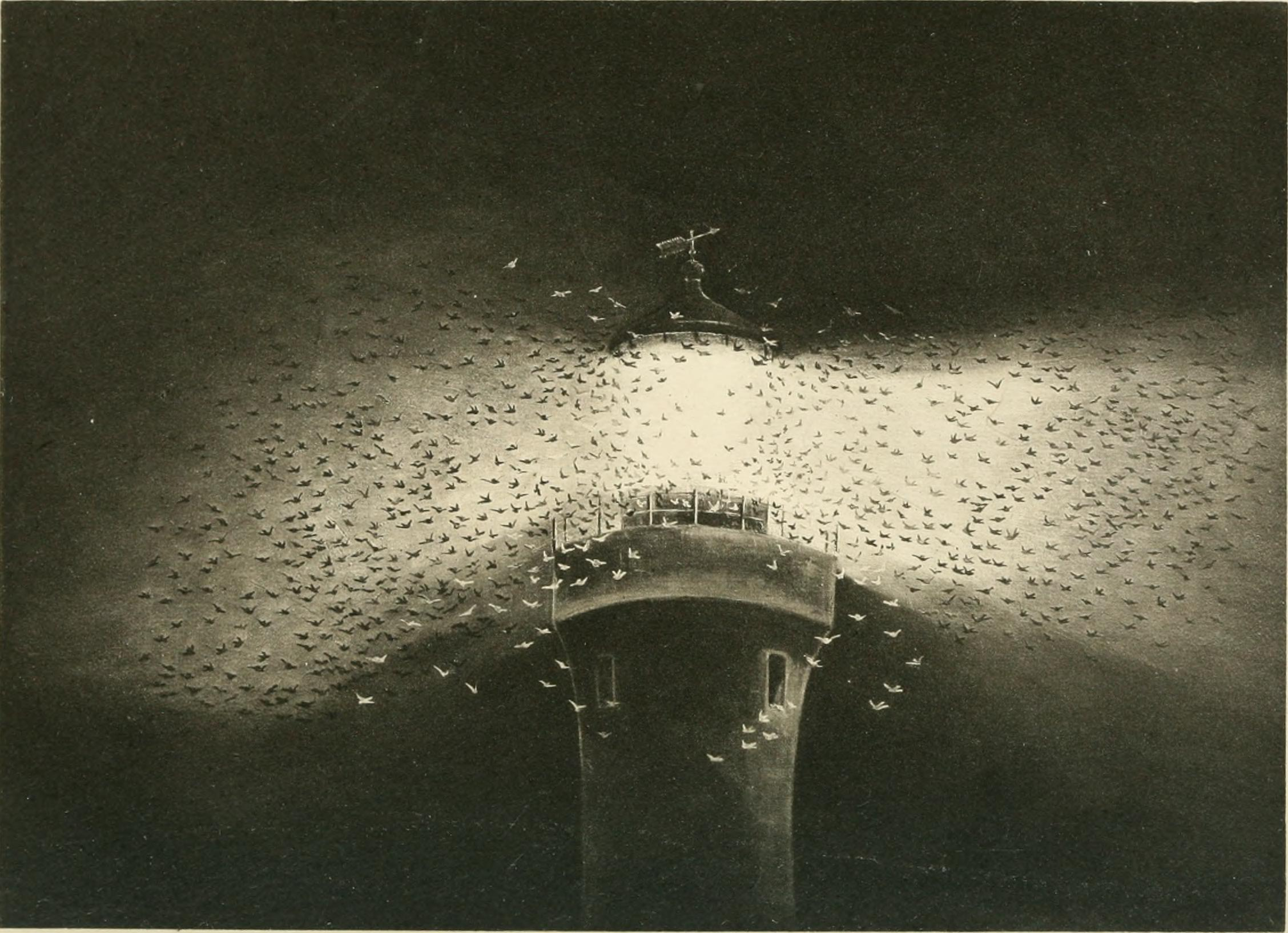
The Eddystone Lantern, October 12, 1901 from a painting by Marian Eagle Clarke, as published in Studies in Bird Migration (1912).

- Clarke, William Eagle (1896). Bird migration in Great Britain and Ireland : digest of observations on migrations of birds at lighthouses and lightvessels, 1880-87. London: British Association for the Advancement of Science. OCLC 931262025 (all editions).
- —— (1901). "Acanthis linaria rostrata in the Outer Hebrides". The Auk. 18 (4–October): 395–396. doi:10.2307/4068994. JSTOR 4068994.
- Nelson, Thomas Hudson; Clarke, William Eagle; Boyes, F. (1907). The Birds of Yorkshire. Vol. 1.
- Atlas of Zoogeography. Bartholomew, J.G., Clarke, W.E., Grimshaw, P.H. John Bartholomew and Co., Edinburgh. (1911)
- Studies in Bird Migration (1912).
- Manual of British Birds Third edition, Gurney & Jackson (1927) (revisions to the earlier editions by Howard Saunders)
