= British Ornithologists' Union =

British organization of ornithology

- Abbreviation: BOU
- Formation: 1858; 168 years ago
- President: Graeme Buchanan
- Vice-presidents: Richard Bradbury & Emma Cunningham
- Treasurer: Graham Appleton
- Secretary: Mark Eaton
- Key people: Alfred Newton (founder)
- Main organ: Council of Trustees
- Website: www.bou.org.uk

The British Ornithologists' Union (BOU) aims to encourage the study of birds (ornithology) around the world in order to understand their biology and aid their conservation. The BOU was founded in 1858 by Professor Alfred Newton, Henry Baker Tristram and other scientists. Its quarterly journal, Ibis, has been published continuously since 1859.

The Records Committee (BOURC) is a committee of the BOU established to maintain the British List, the official list of birds recorded in Great Britain.

BOU is headquartered in Peterborough and is a registered charity in England & Wales and Scotland.

== Objectives and activities ==
- Publishes Ibis as a leading international journal of ornithological science.
- Organizes a program of meetings and conferences.
- Awards grants and bursaries for ornithological research.
- Encourages liaison between those actively engaged in ornithological research.
- Provides a representative body of the scientific community able to provide ornithological information and advice to the government and other policy makers.
- Maintains and publishes the official list of birds recorded in Britain – The British List.

== Records committee ==
The British Ornithologists' Union Records Committee (BOURC) is the recognized national bird records committee for Britain. It maintains a list of birds in Britain. Its findings are published in Ibis, the house journal of its parent body, the British Ornithologists' Union (BOU). From time to time, BOURC re-reviews records that it has previously accepted to ensure they are acceptable in light of improved knowledge of the species in question.

The Committee does not assess records of birds from Ireland; that task is carried out by the Irish Rare Birds Committee, which publishes its decisions in Irish Birds. For many years, records of IRBC-assessed rarities were included in the BOURC's reports, but this ceased in 2002, at the request of IRBC.

BOURC is widely recognized as maintaining the most authoritative list of birds in Britain. In 2025 the BOURC adopted the AviList global avian taxonomy.

BOURC has a chairman, a secretary and a number of voting members. It previously had a taxonomic subcommittee set up to advise on taxonomic matters, but the disbanding of this subcommittee was announced on 6 November 2015; the BOU now contemplates relying entirely on one of the available global avian taxonomies with a view to adopting a single system for all its activities.

=== Committee and taxonomic reports ===
The Committee publishes an annual report in Ibis (the BOU's international journal of avian science). All reports can be accessed via the British List pages of the BOU website.

Previously, the Committee's Taxonomic Sub-committee also published regular reports, also in Ibis, and these too can be accessed via the British List pages of the BOU website.

=== The Druridge Bay curlew ===
Following a detailed review by the British Birds Rarities Committee into the controversial identification of a curlew seen at Druridge Bay in Northumberland in 1998, which came to the conclusion that it was, as had been believed by many observers, a first-summer slender-billed curlew, this identification was accepted by BOURC, leading to the addition of this species to the British List. A subsequent review of the record overturned the original decision Ibis 156 :236-242.

== Awards and lectures ==
The following are awarded:

- Godman-Salvin Medal
- Union Medal (known as the "Janet Kear Union Medal" from 2019)
- Alfred Newton Lecture

== List of presidents ==
- 1858–1867: Henry Maurice Drummond-Hay (1814–1896)
- 1867–1896: Lord Lilford (1833–1896)
- 1896–1913: Frederick DuCane Godman (1834–1919)
- 1913–1918: Robert George Wardlaw-Ramsay (1852–1921)
- 1918–1921: William Eagle Clarke (1853–1938)
- 1921–1922: Henry John Elwes (1846–1922)
- 1923–1928: Lord Walter Rothschild (1868–1937)
- 1928–1933: William Lutley Sclater (1863–1944)
- 1933–1938: Harry Witherby (1873–1943)
- 1938–1943: Sir Norman Boyd Kinnear (1882–1957)
- 1943–1948: Percy Roycroft Lowe (1870–1948)
- 1948–1955: Sir Arthur Landsborough Thomson (1890–1977)
- 1955–1960: William Homan Thorpe (1902–1986)
- 1960–1965: Reginald Ernest Moreau (1897–1970)
- 1965–1970: V. C. Wynne-Edwards (1906–1997)
- 1970–1975: Guy Mountfort (1905–2003)
- 1975–1979: Sir Hugh Elliott (1913–1989)
- 1979–1983: Stanley Cramp (1913–1987)
- 1983–1987: James F. Monk (1915–2014)
- 1987–1990: David Snow
- 1990–1994: Janet Kear (1933–2004)
- 1994–1999: John Croxall
- 1999–2003: Ian Newton
- 2003–2007: Christopher Perrins
- 2007–2011: Alistair Dawson (Centre for Ecology & Hydrology)
- 2011–2015: Jenny Gill (University of East Anglia)
- 2015–2019: Keith Hamer (University of Leeds)
- 2019–2023: Juliet Vickery (RSPB/BTO)

== Honorary life members ==
The following have been elected as honorary life members:

- Peter Berthold (Germany)
- Jacques Blondel (France)
- Paul F. Donald (UK)
- Urs N. Glutz von Blotzheim (Switzerland)
- Andrew G. Gosler (UK)
- Soekarja Somadikarta (Indonesia)
- Staffan Ulfstrand (Sweden)

== See also ==
- British Ornithologists' Union checklists
- British Birds Rarities Committee
