= Hilton Brown (writer) =

Charles Hilton Brown (1890–1961), who wrote under the name Hilton Brown, was a Scottish writer, poet, novelist and Indian Civil Service officer, who was known for his writings on the history and social life of Scotland and South India. He is considered the most likely candidate for the anonymous author of A Civilian's South India (1921).

His son Leslie Hilton Brown was a notable ornithologist.

== Works ==
- The Civilian's South India (1921)
- The Second Lustre (1923)
- Potter's Clay: Some Stories of South India (1927)
- Both Sides Of Suez (1930)
- Maya: Some More South Indian Stories (1933)
- The Gold & The Grey - some more collected verses (1936)
- Glory's Children (1936)
- Rudyard Kipling: A New Appreciation (1945)
- The Sahibs: The Life and Ways of the British in India (1948)
- There was a Lad: An Essay on Robert Burns (1949)
- Warm or very Warm: The Story of a Scottish Summer (1952)
- Parry's of Madras: A Story of the British Enterprise in India (1954)
