= John Croxall =

British biologist and ornithologist

John Patrick Croxall CBE FRS (born 19 January 1946 in Birmingham) is a British biologist, and was Head of Conservation Biology at the British Antarctic Survey. He is Chair of Global Seabird Programme, of BirdLife International.

== Life ==
Croxall completed a PhD at the University of Auckland in 1971, on ascidian ecology, supervised by John Morton. He was senior research associate in zoology, at the University of Newcastle upon Tyne from 1972 to 1975. He won a Scientific Medal in 1984, from the Zoological Society of London. He received a President’s Medal from the British Ecological Society.
