= Jenny Gill =

New Zealand philanthropy worker

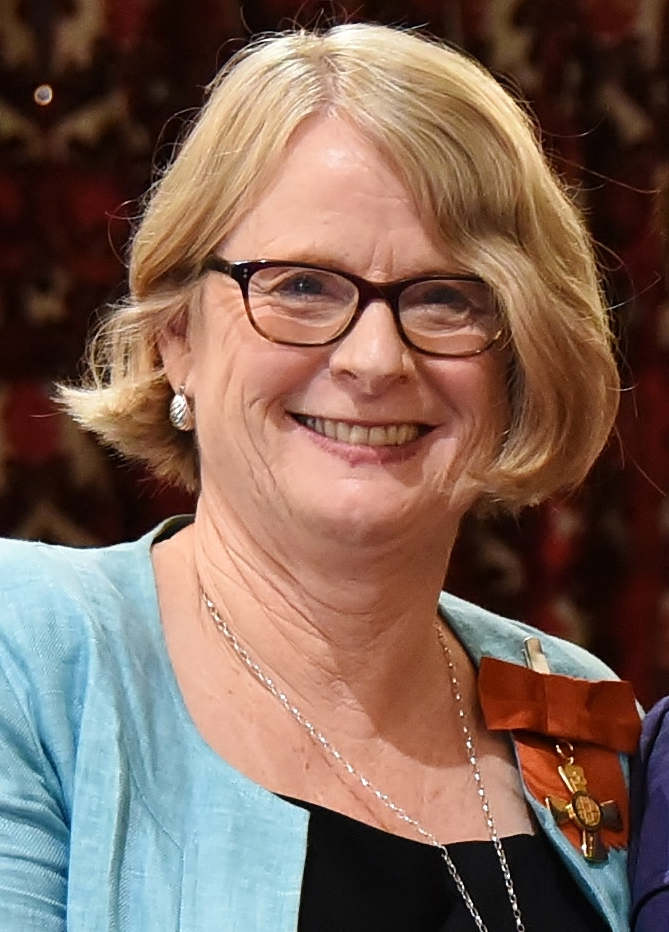
Gill in 2017

Jennifer Mary Gill ONZM (born 1951) is a semi-retired executive from New Zealand who works in philanthropy. She was New Zealand's first full-time paid employee working in philanthropy, and the chair of Philanthropy New Zealand.

== Biography ==
Jennifer Gill, daughter of Jack Thompson Gill (born 1920) and Judith Anthea (née Pharo; born 1925), was born in Lower Hutt in 1951. She studied at Onslow College, Victoria University of Wellington and Auckland Teachers College.

Gill taught at Manurewa East Primary School before becoming regional organizer for the aid agency Council of Organisations for Relief Services Overseas (CORSO) and travelled to visit CORSO projects in India, Sri Lanka and Nepal. Gill was also the activities organizer for and a member of the board of the Wellington YWCA.

Gill's work with organizations involved in philanthropy began in 1985, when Sir Roy McKenzie appointed her the executive officer of his new personal foundation, the Roy McKenzie Foundation, which she helped to set up and run. In 1990 while working for McKenzie, Gill was involved in the creation of Philanthropy New Zealand (formally the New Zealand Association of Philanthropic Trusts) and served as a trustee.

In 1994, Gill was appointed executive director of Fulbright New Zealand, an academic exchange programme between New Zealand and the United States. Throughout her time at Fulbright NZ, Gill continued her work with philanthropic organizations and was involved with other grant making trusts including being a trustee and chair of the J R McKenzie Trust. She was one of the founding members of the board of the Wellington Regional Community Foundation, was a trustee of the Funding Information Service and was chair of Philanthropy New Zealand for six years. As chair of Philanthropy New Zealand Gill help removed barriers to giving for individuals, businesses and Māori organisations through greatly enhanced tax incentives following a successful campaign to improve tax treatment of charitable donations.

In 2004, Gill returned to philanthropic work full time when she was appointed CEO of Australasia's largest community trust, Foundation North. (formally the ASB Community Trust). In her role at Foundation North, Gill was responsible for an investment portfolio valued at NZ$1.3billion and managed the distribution of grants to community projects in the Auckland and Northland regions valued at more than NZ$40 million annually.

In 2010, Gill retired from the board of Philanthropy New Zealand after twenty years' service.

During her 15 years at Foundation North, Gill was also a member of the Asia Pacific Philanthropy Consortium and participated in international meetings on philanthropy hosted by the Rockefeller and Volkswagen foundations. She is regarded as a champion of effective philanthropy, playing a leading role in the development of the sector.

Gill is currently an independent advisor to the Centre for Social Impact New Zealand, chair of the newly established MAS Foundation, deputy chair of the Prince's Trust (NZ) and a board member of Water Safety New Zealand and the Vodafone New Zealand Foundation.

=== Recognition ===
In 2017, Gill was named a Kiwibank Local Hero and won the inaugural Perpetual Guardian NZ Lifetime Achievement Award in philanthropy.

In the 2017 New Year Honours, Gill was appointed an Officer of the New Zealand Order of Merit, for services to philanthropy.

== Publications ==
- Gill, J., & Roy Mckenzie Foundation (N.Z.). (1992). Foundations in Britain and the United States of America. S.l.: J. Gill.
