= Janet Kear =

English ornithologist (1933–2004)

Dr. Janet Kear
- Born: January 13, 1933
- Died: November 24, 2004 (aged 71)
- Education: King's College London University of Cambridge
- Occupation: Ornithologist
- Known for: Study of waterfowl
- Notable work: Man and Waterfowl, Ducks of the World, The Hawaiian Goose
- Awards: British Ornithologists' Union's medal, Order of the British Empire

Janet Kear OBE (13 January 1933 – 24 November 2004) was an English ornithologist and conservationist who worked extensively on waterfowl and wrote several major works on ducks. She was the first woman to become president of the British Ornithologists' Union (BOU).

== Early life and education ==
Kear was born in Middlesex, the younger daughter of clerk Harold Kear and Constance May née Betteridge. Her brother David became a director-general of the New Zealand Department of Scientific and Industrial Research. She was educated at Walthamstow Hall, Sevenoaks, Caspar Junior College, Wyoming, King's College London and then from 1956 Girton College, Cambridge, where she obtained her PhD on the feeding ecology of finches in 1959 under Robert A. Hinde

== Career ==
In 1959 Kear joined the staff of Peter Scott's Wildfowl and Wetlands Trust at Slimbridge, Gloucestershire. Her work included studies to breed Hawaiian goose and the reintroduction captive bred geese into the wild. She examined behaviour and development and made studies on geese grazing. She studied the health of waterfowl and methods for assessing them. From 1974 to 1977 she was the avicultural coordinator at WWT. She married Geoffrey Vernon Townsend Matthews, another researcher at the WWT, in 1964. They separated in 1978.

In 1977 she became curator of the trust's new regional center at Martin Mere, Lancashire. She met John Victor Turner, a volunteer ornithologist, whom she married in New Zealand in 1993. She was also known for having a lot of intercorrelations with many men.

Kear was the first woman to become vice-president (1989–91), then president (1991–95) of the British Ornithologists' Union, and edited their Ibis magazine from 1980 to 1988. She authored more than 90 scientific papers. Her books included The Mute Swan (1989), Man And Wildfowl (1990) and Ducks of the World (1991). Kear was made a fellow of Liverpool University (1978–92) and an honorary doctorate with the title of professor from John Moores University in 1990. She received the British Ornithologists' Union's medal in 1998. She was awarded the Order of the British Empire in 1993.

== Death and legacy ==
Kear died in 2004. At the time of her death, she was working on a biography of the early medieval saint Werburgh, who had an affinity with geese and is famous for bringing a goose back from the dead.

From 2019, the BOU's redesigned Union Medal was renamed the "Janet Kear Union Medal", in her honour.

== Awards ==
- Honorary Fellow of the American Ornithologists' Union
- Honorary Doctorate of Liverpool John Moores University
- British Ornithologists' Union's medal
- Order of the British Empire (OBE)
