= Chris Perrins =

Ornithologist

Chris Perrins LVO FRS
- Born: 11 May 1935 (age 91)
- Education: Charterhouse School
- Alma mater: Queen Mary College (BSc); University of Oxford (DPhil)
- Spouse: Mary Ceresole Carslake (m. 1963)
- Awards: Godman-Salvin Medal, 2018 RSPB Medal, 1992
- Scientific career
- Fields: Ornithology
- Institutions: University of Oxford; Royal Household
- Thesis: Some factors influencing brood-size and populations in tits (1963)
- Doctoral advisor: David Lack
- Doctoral students: Tim Birkhead; Matt Ridley
- Website: zoo.ox.ac.uk/egi/members/professor-chris-perrins-lvo-frs/

Christopher Miles Perrins, LVO FRS (born 11 May 1935) is Emeritus Fellow of the Edward Grey Institute of Field Ornithology at the University of Oxford, Emeritus Fellow at Wolfson College, Oxford and His Majesty's Warden of the Swans since 1993.

== Education ==
Perrins was educated at Charterhouse School and Queen Mary College where he was awarded a Bachelor of Science degree in Zoology in 1957. He completed his postgraduate study and research at the University of Oxford where he was awarded a Doctor of Philosophy degree in 1963 for research on brood size in tits supervised by David Lack.

== Research and career ==
Perrins research interests are in the population dynamics and breeding biology of birds, particularly tits (Paridae), mute swans and seabirds on Skomer and Skokholm. He investigated animal lead poisoning of swans from lead shot. He is renowned for his work on avian population ecology and, in particular, reproductive rates. He has made a number of important contributions to the long-term study of the great tit at Wytham Woods — an area of mixed woodland established in 1947 by evolutionary biologist David Lack – one of the most famous studies in population ecology.

He was the first to discover that avian clutch size – the number of eggs laid in a single nesting – in great tits has a remarkably high heritability and that the likelihood of the survival of young birds can be traced back to nutrition in the nest. Perrins also demonstrated that females lay a clutch of an appropriate size for their ability to feed. He supervised several successful DPhil students at Oxford including Matt Ridley and Tim Birkhead.

According to Scopus, As of 2016 his most cited journal articles have been published in Ibis, Nature, Science and the Journal of Animal Ecology.

=== Publications ===
- British Tits
- Encyclopedia of Birds
- The Mute Swan
- The Illustrated Encyclopedia of Birds: The Definitive Guide to Birds of the World: Christopher M. Perrins Hardline (1990) ISBN 978-0747202776
- Bird Population Studies: Relevance to Conservation and Management: (Oxford Ornithology Series) by Christopher M. Perrins, G. J. Hirons and J. D. Lebreton (1996) ISBN 978-0198540823
- The Birds of the Western Palearctic, Volume 1: Non-passerines David Snow, Christopher M. Perrins and Robert Gillmor (1998) Oxford University Press. ISBN 978-0198501879
- The Birds of the Western Palearctic, Volume 2: by David Snow, Christopher M. Perrins and Robert Gillmor (1998) Oxford University Press. ISBN 978-0198501886
- The New Encyclopedia of Birds: Editor, (2003) Oxford University Press. ISBN 978-0198525066
- The Complete Encyclopedia of Birds and Bird Migration: Jonathan Elphick: Christopher M. Perrins (2004) ISBN 978-0785816676

=== Awards and honours ===
Perrins has received a number of awards for his research, including the Godman-Salvin Medal of the British Ornithologists' Union in 1988, and the Royal Society for the Protection of Birds (RSPB) Medal in 1992. In 1993, he was appointed as the first Warden of the Swans in the Royal Household, playing an important role in the annual Swan Upping ceremony. This was a new office in the Royal Household of the Sovereign of the United Kingdom, created in 1993. Other awards and honours include:

- American Ornithologists' Union: Corresponding Member, 1976, Fellow, 1983.
- Deutsche Ornithologen-Gesellschaft: Corresponding Fellow, 1991, Life Fellow, 2001.
- Nederlandse Ornithologische Unie: Life Fellow, 1992.
- Elected an Honorary Fellow, Queen Mary; Westfield College in 1996
- Elected a Fellow of the Royal Society (FRS) in 1997
- Union Medal of the British Ornithologists' Union (BOU) in 2016, awarded for outstanding contribution to the BOU and ornithology. having served as President of the BOU from 2003 to 2007
