= Ian Newton =

English ornithologist

Ian Newton OBE FRS FRSE (born 17 January 1940) is an English ornithologist.

== Education and early life ==
Newton was born and raised in north Derbyshire and was educated at Chesterfield Grammar School. He graduated from the University of Bristol. He received his D.Phil. in 1964 and D.Sc. in 1982 from the University of Oxford, and has studied a wide range of bird species.

== Career and research ==
He has been interested in birds since his childhood. As a teenager he became particularly fascinated by finches and undertook doctoral and post-doctoral studies on them. Newton conducted a 27-year study of a Eurasian sparrowhawk population nesting in southern Scotland, which resulted in what many consider to be the most detailed and longest-running study of any population of birds of prey.

Before retirement, he was Senior Ornithologist at the United Kingdom's Natural Environment Research Council. He has also been head of the Avian Biology Section at the Monks Wood Research Station (1989–2000), Chairman of the Board of The Peregrine Fund, Chairman of the Council of the Royal Society for the Protection of Birds, Chairman of Saving India's Vultures from Extinction, and visiting professor of ornithology at the University of Oxford. Newton has also held the positions of President of the British Ornithologists' Union and the British Ecological Society (1994–1995).

=== Partial bibliography ===
- Finches (Collins New Naturalist Library) (1972)
- Population Ecology of Raptors (1979) T & A.D. Poyser. ISBN 978-1408138533
- The Sparrowhawk (1986) T & A.D. Poyser. ISBN 0-85661-041-0
- Population Limitation in Birds (1998)
- The Speciation and Biogeography of Birds (2003)
- The Migration Ecology of Birds (2008 1st ed.; 2024 2nd ed.)
- Bird Migration (Collins New Naturalist Library) (2010) ISBN 978-0-00-730731-9 (HB), ISBN 978-0-00-730732-6 (PB)
- Bird Populations (Collins New Naturalist Library) (2013) ISBN 978-0-00-742953-0
- Farming and Birds (Collins New Naturalist Library) (2017) ISBN 978-0-00-814789-1
- Uplands and Birds (Collins New Naturalist Library) (2020) ISBN 978-0-00-829850-0

== Honours and awards ==
- Union Medal of the British Ornithological Union (1988)
- Gold Medal of the Royal Society for the Protection of Birds (1991)
- Elected a Fellow of the Royal Society (FRS) in 1993
- Fellow of the Royal Society of Edinburgh (1994)
- Elliot Cowes Award of the American Ornithologists' Union (1995)
- Order of the British Empire (1999)
- President's Medal of the British Ecological Society
