= Duncan (surname) =

Duncan is a Scottish surname. The Scottish Gaelic name Donncheann or Donnchadh are bynames composed of the elements donn, meaning "brown" or "dark" from Donn a Gaelic God; and chadh, meaning "chief" or "noble". In some cases when the surname was used in County Sligo, Ireland, it is an Anglicized form of the Irish Gaelic name MacDonough or Mac Donnchadha and Ó Duinnchinn, meaning "descendant of Donncheann". The surname Duncan is represented in Scottish Gaelic as MacDhonn.

== Acting ==
- Carmen Duncan (1942–2019), Australian actress
- Lindsay Duncan (born 1950), Scottish actress
- Michael Clarke Duncan (1957–2012), American actor
- Sandy Duncan (born 1946), American actress

== Art and design ==
- Charles Stafford Duncan (1892–1952), San Francisco painter and lithographer.
- Edward Duncan (1803–1882), British watercolorist
- Jane Duncan (architect) (born 1953), British architect
- Jean Duncan (artist) (1933–2018), British artist
- Walter Duncan (1848–1932), British painter

== Military, armed forces ==
- Adam Duncan, 1st Viscount Duncan (1731–1804), British admiral
- Donald B. Duncan (1896–1975), American vice-admiral
- Donald W. Duncan (1930–2009), American soldier and anti-war activist
- Silas Duncan (1788–1834), American naval officer
- Gordon Duncan (RAF officer) (1899–1941), Scottish WW1 flying ace
- Henry Duncan (1735–1814), British naval officer
- Pippa Duncan, British naval officer
- W. G. G. Duncan Smith (1914–1996), British military aviator
- William "Art" Duncan (1891–1975), Canadian aviator

== Music ==
- C Duncan, born Christopher Duncan, Scottish composer and musician whose debut album Architect was nominated for the 2015 Mercury Prize
- Gary Duncan (1946–2019), American guitarist and singer
- Johnny Duncan (country singer) (1938–2006), American singer
- Lesley Duncan, English singer and songwriter
- Little Arthur Duncan (1934–2008), American blues harmonica player, singer, and songwriter
- Molly Duncan (1945–2019), Scottish tenor saxophonist
- Tim Duncan (singer), Southern Gospel singer
- Trevor Duncan, English composer
- Zélia Duncan, Brazilian singer and songwriter

== Politics ==
- Alan Duncan (born 1957), British politician
- Arne Duncan (born 1964), U.S. Secretary of Education (2009–2015)
- Charles Duncan Jr. (1926–2022), U.S. Secretary of Energy (1979–1981)
- Frank I. Duncan (1858–1946), American politician, lawyer, judge and newspaper publisher
- Geoff Duncan (born 1975), American politician
- Jeff Duncan (politician) (born 1966), American politician
- Jimmy Duncan, (born 1947), American politician, U.S. Representative from Tennessee's 2nd congressional district (1988–2019)
- John Duncan Sr., (1919–1988), American politician, U.S. Representative from Tennessee's 2nd congressional district (1965–1988), father of Jimmy Duncan
- Johnathan Duncan, American politician and Kansas City, Missouri, city council member
- Kirsty Duncan (1966–2026), Canadian politician and Deputy Leader of the Government in the House of Commons
- Leslie Duncan (1880–1952), newspaper editor and politician in South Australia
- Mike Duncan (politician) (born 1951), chairman of the Board of Governors of the United States Postal Service and former chairman of the Republican National Committee in the United States
- Patty Duncan, South African politician
- Peter Duncan (Australian politician) (born 1945), Labor representative in South Australian and federal parliaments
- Peter Duncan (British politician) (born 1965), Scottish politician, Member of Parliament from Galloway and Upper Nithsdale (2001–2005)
- Renita Duncan, American politician
- Sir Walter Gordon Duncan (1885–1963), South Australian pastoralist and MLC
- Walter Hughes Duncan (1848–1906), South Australian pastoralist and MHA for Burra
- Walter Leslie Duncan (1883–1947), Australian Senator for New South Wales
- Wesley Duncan (b. 1980), American politician and member of the Nevada Assembly
- William Addison Duncan (1836–1884), U.S. Representative from Pennsylvania's 19th congressional district (1883–1984)

== Sports ==
- Alexander Duncan (1884–1959), British long-distance runner
- Alex Duncan (1900–1984), Australian rules football player
- Andy Duncan (basketball) (1922–2006), American basketball player
- Bobby Duncan (born 1945), Scottish footballer
- Bobby Duncan (footballer, born 2001)
- Cecil Duncan (1893–1979), Canadian ice hockey administrator
- Chris Duncan (1981–2019), American baseball player
- Dave Duncan (baseball) (born 1945), Major League Baseball player and pitching coach, father of Chris Duncan and Shelley Duncan
- Darryl Duncan, Australian rugby league footballer
- Eric Duncan (born 1984), American baseball coach
- George Duncan (golfer) (1883–1964), Scottish golfer
- Ian Duncan (born 1961), Kenyan rally driver
- Jaelyn Duncan (born 2000), American football player
- Jean Duncan (umpire), Scottish hockey umpire
- Jeff Duncan (baseball) (born 1978), American baseball player and coach
- John Duncan (footballer) (1949–2022), Scottish footballer who notably played for Dundee and Tottenham Hotspur
- Johnny Duncan (footballer) (1896–1966), Scottish international footballer and manager, who was most notably with Leicester City
- Jon Duncan (born 1975), British orienteer
- Jonathan Duncan (swimmer) (born 1982), New Zealand swimmer
- Katie Duncan (born 1988), New Zealand association footballer
- Ken Duncan (American football) (born 1946), American football player
- Mariano Duncan (born 1963), Dominican baseball player
- Priscilla Duncan (born 1983), New Zealand footballer
- Rick Duncan (born 1941), American football player
- Ross Duncan (born 1944), Australian cricketer
- Sam Duncan, Westmeath Gaelic footballer
- Scott Duncan (footballer) (1888–1976), former Scottish football player and manager
- Shelley Duncan, American baseball player
- Tim Duncan (born 1976), American basketball player
- Vern Duncan (1890–1954), American baseball player

== Writers ==
- Alasdair Duncan, Australian writer
- Dave Duncan (writer) (1933–2018), Canadian writer
- Glen Duncan (born 1965), British author
- Isabelle Wight Duncan (1812–1878), Scottish author
- Jane Duncan (1910–1976), pseudonym of Scottish writer Elizabeth Jane Cameron
- John Shute Duncan (1768–1844), English academic, writer, and museum curator
- Lois Duncan (1934–2016), American writer of children's books
- Mary Lundie Duncan (1814–1840), Scottish poet and hymn-writer
- Philip Bury Duncan (1772–1863), English academic, writer, and museum curator
- Robert Duncan (poet), American beat poet
- Sara Jeannette Duncan (1861–1922), Canadian author and journalist

== Other fields ==
- Bruce Duncan (born 1938), British priest and founder
- Carl Porter Duncan (1921–1999), professor of experimental psychology at Northwestern University, US
- Dan Duncan (1933–2010), American businessman
- David Duncan, government witness in the Enron scandal
- David Douglas Duncan (1916–2018), American photojournalist
- David F. Duncan, epidemiologist and drug policy adviser to former US President Bill Clinton
- Donald F. Duncan Sr., American entrepreneur and inventor, most commonly associated with Yo-yos
- Gary Duncan, defendant in case Duncan v. Louisiana decided by the US Supreme Court
- George Smith Duncan, a tramway and mining engineer
- Geillis Duncan (d. 1591), a Scottish maidservant accused of witchcraft
- Graham Duncan (botanist), botanist at Kirstenbosch Botanic Garden, South Africa
- Helen Duncan (1897–1956), Scottish medium
- Henry Duncan (minister), founder of the first Trustee Savings Bank
- Herbert Osbaldeston Duncan (1862–1945), English racing bicyclist, journalist, and pioneer of the British automobile industry
- Iain Duncan Smith, British politician
- Isadora Duncan, American dancer
- Jonathan Duncan (currency reformer) (1799–1865), British advocate of reforming the monetary system
- Jonathan Duncan (Governor of Bombay) (1756–1811)
- Joseph Edward Duncan (1963–2021), American convicted serial killer and child molester
- Kath Duncan (1888 or 1889–1954), Scottish communist activist
- Ken Duncan (photographer) (born 1954), Australian photographer
- Laurence Ilsley Duncan (1906–1982), justice of the New Hampshire Supreme Court
- Leslie Duncan (1880–1952), newspaper editor and politician in South Australia
- Marion Moncure Duncan (1913–1978), American businesswoman and lineage society leader
- Mary Ellen Duncan (died 2022), American academic administrator and teacher
- Mike Duncan (podcaster), American history podcaster and writer
- Pearl Duncan, Australian retired teacher, anthropologist, academic and Aboriginal elder.
- Robert Kennedy Duncan (1868–1914), American industrial chemist
- Scott Duncan (businessman), American billionaire
- Stephen Duncan (1787–1867), American plantation owner in the Antebellum South
- Stewart Duncan (philosopher), American philosopher
- Thomas Eric Duncan (1972–2014), the first Ebola victim of the 2014 West African outbreak to develop symptoms while in the US
- Todd Duncan (author), author and motivational speaker
- Vender Duncan (1928–1959), American serial killer
- Walter Jack Duncan (1881–1941), war artist for the US Army during World War I
- Warren W. Duncan (1857–1938), American jurist
- William Duncan (American physician) (1860–1900), American physician and politician
- William Duncan (philosopher) (1717–1760), Scottish natural philosopher and classicist

== Fictional characters ==
- Karen Beecher-Duncan, supporting character (and sometime member) of the Teen Titans (DC Comics)
- Lily Duncan, a fictional character from Mona the Vampire
- Mal Duncan, supporting character (and sometime member) of the Teen Titans (DC Comics)
- Tammy & Tommy Duncan, supporting characters from The Mighty Ducks.
- Tyler Duncan and Mrs. Duncan are secondary characters in Big Time Rush
- Duncan, the main characters family's surname in Good Luck Charlie
- Veronica Duncan, supporting character in Young Sheldon
- Ian Duncan, a character in the TV series Community, played by actor John Oliver
- King Duncan, of Shakespeare's Macbeth
- Duncan, (Walter Sparrow) Robin of Locksley's companion in the 1991 film Robinhood Prince of Thieves.
- Duncan Idaho, a Mentat from Frank Herbert's Dune
- Tara Duncan, the titular character of the French fourteenth-book series by Sophie Audouin-Mamikonian. Unfortunately, only the first two have been translated into English.
- Carter Duncan, the main antagonist of The Perfect Guy (2015 film)
- Geillis Duncan, a character in the Outlander book series by Diana Gabaldon and in its TV adaptation

== See also ==
- Andrew Duncan (disambiguation)
- Andy Duncan (disambiguation)
- Clan Duncan
- Duncan (given name)
- Frank Duncan (disambiguation)
- James Duncan (disambiguation)
- John Duncan (disambiguation)
- Raymond Duncan (disambiguation)
