= John Duncan =

John or Johnny Duncan may refer to:

== Arts and entertainment ==
- John Duncan (painter) (1866–1945), Scottish painter
- John Duncan (harpist) (1904–1998), English musician
- Johnny Duncan (actor) (1923–2016), American actor
- Johnny Duncan (bluegrass musician) (1931–2000), American skiffle and bluegrass musician
- Johnny Duncan (country singer) (1938–2006), American country-music singer
- John Duncan (American artist) (born 1953), American artist and musician
- Big John Duncan (born 1958), Scottish punk musician

== Law, government, and politics ==
- John Holt Duncan (1820–1896), American lawyer and judge, co-founder of Beta Theta Pi at Miami University
- Sir John Duncan (Australian politician) (1845–1913), South Australian pastoralist and politician
- John Duncan (New Zealand politician, born 1848) (1848–1924), New Zealand member of parliament
- John D. C. Duncan Jr. (1884–1958), American politician and lawyer
- John Edward Duncan (1884–1959), member of the New Zealand Legislative Council
- John Duncan Sr. (1919–1988), U.S. representative from Tennessee
- Jock Duncan (diplomat) (John Spencer Ritchie Duncan, 1921–2006), British administrator in Sudan and diplomat
- John Alton Duncan (1932–2007), Manitoba judge
- John Duncan (American government official) (born 1945), official in the U.S. Department of the Treasury
- Jimmy Duncan (politician) (John James Duncan Jr., born 1947), U.S. Representative from Tennessee, son of John Duncan Sr.
- John Duncan (Canadian politician) (born 1948), member of parliament from British Columbia
- John Duncan (diplomat, born 1958), British diplomat

== Military ==
- John Duncan (British Army officer, born 1870) (1870–1960), British general
- Sir John Duncan (British Army officer, born 1872) (1872–1948), British general

== Religion ==
- John Dongan (or John Duncan, died 1413), Manx priest in the Isle of Man and Ireland
- John Duncan (English writer) (1721–1808), English priest, miscellaneous writer and army chaplain
- John Duncan (theologian) (1796–1870), Free Church of Scotland minister, missionary, hebraist and orientalist
- John Duncan (English archdeacon) (born 1933), English Anglican priest, archdeacon of Birmingham, 1985–2001

== Science, technology and medicine ==
- John Duncan (weaving writer) (fl. 1800–1818), Scottish writer on weaving
- John Duncan (botanist) (1794–1881), Scottish weaver and botanist
- John Duncan (surgeon) (1839–1899), Scottish surgeon, president of the Royal College of Surgeons of Edinburgh
- John Charles Duncan (1882–1967), American astronomer
- John Duncan (neuroscientist) (born 1953), British neuroscientist
- John S. Duncan (born 1955), British neurologist

== Sports ==
- John William Duncan (1885–1963), Welsh field hockey player
- Johnny Duncan (footballer) (1896–1966), Scottish football player and manager associated with Leicester City
- Art Duncan (John Arthur Duncan, 1891–1975), Canadian ice hockey player
- Ross Duncan (John Ross Duncan, born 1944), Australian cricketer
- John Duncan (footballer) (1949–2022), Scottish football player and manager

== Others ==
- John Shute Duncan (1768–1844), English academic, writer, and museum curator
- John Duncan (explorer) (1805–1849), British soldier and explorer in Africa
- John Riley Duncan (1850–1911), Texas lawman
- John H. Duncan (1855–1929), American architect
- John Duncan (historian) (1938–2022), American historian and writer

== See also ==
- Jon Duncan (born 1975), British orienteering world champion
- Jack Duncan (disambiguation)
- Jonathan Duncan (disambiguation)
