= Renita =

Renita or Renitta is a feminine given name.

== List of people with the given name ==
- Renita Brunton, suspected murder victim of Peter Dupas
- Renita Duncan, American politician
- Renita Farrell (born 1972), Australian former field hockey player
- Renita Holmes, American housing activist
- Renitta Shannon (born 1979), American politician
- Renita J. Weems (born 1954), American Hebrew Bible scholar

== See also ==
- Reniță
