= Jonathan Duncan =

Jonathan Duncan may refer to:

- Jonathan Duncan (governor of Bombay) (1756–1811), British colonial administrator
- Jonathan Duncan (swimmer) (born 1982), New Zealand swimmer
- Jon Duncan (born 1975), British orienteer
- Jonathan Duncan (currency reformer) (1799–1865), British advocate of reforming the monetary system
- Jonathan Lincoln Duncan, fictional President of the United States and main character of the novel The President Is Missing (2018) by Bill Clinton and James Patterson

== See also ==
- John Duncan (disambiguation)
- Johnathan Duncan, American politician and Kansas City, Missouri, city council member
