= Heath Clark =

American Software Engineer, Software Systems Engineer politician from Georgia

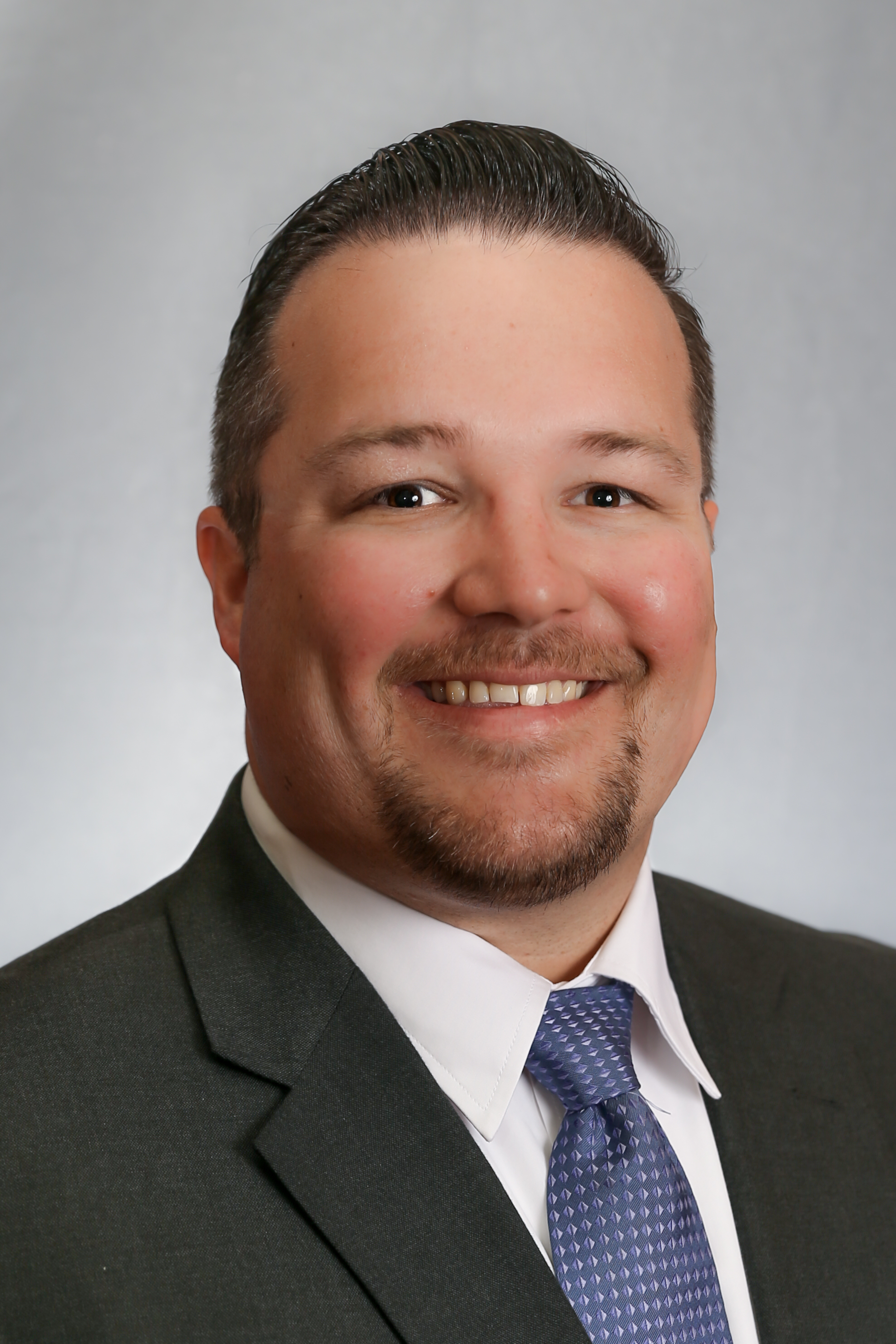

Member of the Georgia House of Representatives from the 147th district
- In office January 12, 2015 – January 9, 2023
- Preceded by: Willie Talton
- Succeeded by: Bethany Ballard

Personal details
- Born: October 14, 1980 (age 46) Warner Robins, Georgia
- Party: Republican
- Spouse: Lindsey Clark
- Children: 4
- Education: Middle Georgia State University
- Occupation: Software Engineer, Software Systems Engineer, politician
- Other name: Heath N. Clark

Heath Nicholas Clark (born October 14, 1980) is an American Software Engineer, Software Systems Engineer and politician from Georgia. Clark is a former Republican member of Georgia House of Representatives from the 147th district from 2015 to 2023.

== Early life ==
Clark's father was in the U.S. Air Force. At 2 weeks old, Clark's family lived in Japan. In 1983, Clark's family moved to Georgia. Clark grew up in Warner Robins, Georgia. In 1999, Clark graduated from Warner Robins High School.

== Education ==
Clark attended Southeastern Baptist Theological Seminary in Wake Forrest, North Carolina. Clarked earned an Associates degree from Georgia Military College. In 2005, Clark earned a Bachelor of Arts degree in information technology from Middle Georgia State University in Macon, Georgia.

== Career ==
Clark started his career as a pastor. Clark is a Software Engineer and a Software Systems Engineer.

On November 4, 2014, Clark won the election unopposed and became a Republican member of Georgia House of Representatives for District 147. On November 8, 2016, as an incumbent, Clark won the election unopposed and continued serving District 147. On November 6, 2018, as an incumbent, Clark won the election and continued serving District 147. Clark defeated Fenika Miller with 54.15% of the votes. On November 3, 2020, as an incumbent, Clark won the election and continued serving District 147. Clark defeated Stephen Baughier with 52.26% of the votes.

== Personal life ==
Clark's wife is Lindsey Clark. They have four children. Clark and his family live in Warner Robins, Georgia.

== See also ==
- 2020 Georgia House of Representatives election

Georgia House of Representatives
Preceded by Willie Talton	Member of the Georgia House of Representatives from the 147th district 2015–2023	Succeeded by Bethany Ballard
