= Jack Duncan =

Jack Duncan may refer to:

- Jack Duncan (rugby union) (1900–1969), Australian rugby union player
- John Riley Duncan (1850–1911), known as Jack, Texas lawman
- Jack Duncan (soccer) (born 1993), Australian football (soccer) goalkeeper

== See also ==
- Jack Duncan-Hughes (1882–1962), Australian politician
- Walter Jack Duncan (1881–1941), American war artist
- John Duncan (disambiguation)
