= Rachel Jenkins =

British academic

Rachel Jenkins OBE
- Known for: Mental health
- Scientific career
- Institutions: King's College London; London School of Hygiene & Tropical Medicine

Rachel McDougall Jenkins OBE (born 17 April 1949) is a professor of epidemiology and international mental health policy at the Institute of Psychiatry, King's College London, director of the World Health Organization (WHO) Collaborating Centre and a visiting professor at the London School of Hygiene & Tropical Medicine.

== Life ==
She was educated at Haberdashers' Monmouth School for Girls, St Paul's Girls' School and Girton College, Cambridge.

In 2005 to 2011, Jenkins led the WHO programme enabling primary care workers to provide mental healthcare in Kenya, with the outcome that 1,677 primary care workers and 195 medical supervisory staff received training. She is a member of the editorial board of the International Journal of Mental Health Systems.

Jenkins was appointed Officer of the Order of the British Empire (OBE) in the 2023 New Year Honours for services to mental health policy and research in the UK and overseas.

== Selected publications ==
- Jenkins, Rachel; Kiima, David; Njenga, Frank; Okonji, Marx; Kingora, James; Kathuku, Dammas; Lock, Sarah (2010). "Integration of mental health into primary care in Kenya". World Psychiatry. 9 (2): 118–120. doi:10.1002/j.2051-5545.2010.tb00289.x. PMC 2911092. PMID 20671901.
- Cheng, Andrew TA; Chen, Tony HH; Chwen-chen, Chen; Jenkins, Rachel (2000). "Psychosocial and psychiatric risk factors for suicide: Case-control psychological autopsy study". British Journal of Psychiatry. 177 (4): 360–365. doi:10.1192/bjp.177.4.360. PMID 11116779.
- Jenkins, Rachel; Lewis, G.; Bebbington, P.; Brugha, T.; Farrell, M.; Gill, B.; Meltzer, H. (1997). "The National Psychiatric Morbidity surveys of Great Britain—initial findings from the household survey". Psychological Medicine. 27 (4): 775–789. doi:10.1017/S0033291797005308. hdl:2381/21939. PMID 9234456. S2CID 11878576.
