= Ronald Hickling =

British ornithologist

Ronald Arthur Overton Hickling (1912 – 18 October 2006) was a British ornithologist. He served as president of the Leicestershire and Rutland Ornithological Society. He died in Rothley, Leicestershire, at the age of 93.

== Publications ==
Books authored by Hickling include:

- 1978 – The Birds of Leicestershire and Rutland. Leicestershire & Rutland Ornithological Society. ISBN 0-901041-08-4
- 1983 – Enjoying Ornithology: a celebration of fifty years of the British Trust for Ornithology, 1933-1983. Poyser:Calton. ISBN 0-85661-036-4 (editor and compiler)
- 1988 – Birds at Gibraltar Point: a systematic list covering the years 1949 to 1987. Lincolnshire and South Humberside Trust for Nature Conservation. ISBN 0-9501420-3-4 (with Stephen Davies)
- 1996 – James Harley: a Leicestershire Naturalist, 1801-1860. Leicestershire Museums, Arts & Records Service. ISBN 0-85022-391-1

== Honours ==
- 1957 – Bernard Tucker Medal of the British Trust for Ornithology
- 1979 – Honorary Master of Science degree from Leicester University
- 1983 – Bernard Tucker Medal of the British Trust for Ornithology
