= John Callion =

British ornithologist

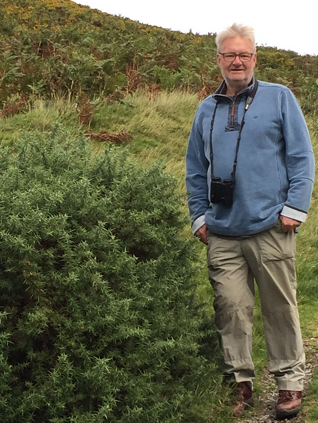
John Callion, Ornithologist

John Cragg Callion is a British ornithologist. His 25-year study of the European stonechat and his findings on the Eurasian dotterel have revealed much previously unknown information about both species.

== Biography ==
John Callion was born in 1946 in Workington, Cumbria. He developed an interest in birds while still at school, and has devoted over 50 years to the study of birds, in particular the European stonechat, the Eurasian dotterel, the whinchat and the wood warbler.

Callion has been an active member of the British Trust for Ornithology since 1973 and was formerly its representative in Cumbria. He was a founder member of the Cumbria Bird Club, the Cumbria ornithological society, which was established in 1989 and he was elected its first chairman.

He has written numerous papers on birds and bird-life. He is the co-author of The Breeding Birds of Cumbria - A Tetrad Atlas 1997-2001.

== Bernard Tucker medal ==
Callion received the 1996 Bernard Tucker Medal, named after the noted ornithologist Bernard Tucker and awarded annually for outstanding services to ornithology by the British Trust for Ornithology.

== 25-year study of the European stonechat ==
Callion published the results of his 25-year study of the European stonechat in British Birds in November 2015. He carried out his research at close quarters in the field in his native Cumbria, and in France and Spain.

His study has gained him recognition as an authority on the European stonechat. In an article in The Times entitled Stonechats' secrets revealed, the British naturalist, author and former Man Booker Prize judge Derwent May hailed Callion's findings and revelations as 'splendid contributions to knowledge', and said:

"He has found 1,300 nests and put coloured rings on the legs of numerous nestlings to follow the story of their lives...

Callion describes, as never before, the light-hearted way in which the female takes her incubation duties at first, coming off the eggs every hour and stopping to preen casually, before going back. However, she becomes more and more frenetic, and by the time the eggs are about to hatch, she is incubating for three hours unbroken and coming off to feed for only three minutes..."

In 2022 Callion published research on nest site selection from further studies of the European stonechat. The autumn 2023 edition of Lakeland Naturalist captures the timings of a triple brooded pair of Stonechats close the west beach at Silloth; here Callion discovers, that from the date of the first egg from the first clutch, ‘til the chicks from the third brood became independent that the adult pair had been ‘breeding’ for five months.

== Eurasian dotterel ==
Callion has also carried out a comprehensive study of the Eurasian dotterel along the lines of his European stonechat research. In 2015, his findings and reflections were published in Lakeland Naturalist, the Cumbrian naturalist journal. In 2018, a history of the Dotterel in Cumbria, coauthored with John Strowger was published in the Transactions of Carlisle Natural History Society. This 125th Anniversary edition also featured Callion's article on the Eurasian reed warbler written with Pete Davies.

In the 2025 edition of British Birds, Callion and Donato review the historical and current status of breeding Dotterel in Cumbria. Following 20 years (1995-2015) without confirmed breeding, they suggest that several pairs breeding on seven different fell tops since 2016 could be a result of reduced sheep stocking since 2001 allowing recovery of montane vegetation communities.

== Cumbrian birds ==
Recent publications are based on the extensive data and observation Callion and his team have collected over 6 decades in Cumbria, this research has detailed the behaviour of several species over a long period. The timing and orientation of post-nesting migration of Cumbrian Sedge Warblers, Nesting Grasshopper Warblers in West Cumbria, Phylloscopus Warblers in the Keswick area, and Rock Pipits in Cumbria. Callion's research on the relationship between weight, wingspan and migration in blackbirds was published in British Birds.

In the spring edition of Lakeland Naturalist 2023, using current and historical data from his nest box studies in the Loweswater and Wythop valleys he reveals that the trans-Saharan migrant, the Pied Flycatcher is now nesting 12 days earlier than it did in the early 1980’s.

From ringing information towards the end of the 20th century Callion demonstrates that the Blackcaps wintering in south-west Cumbria at the Eskmeals Ministry of Defence Gun Range, are from a different population from the migratory breeding birds. Ringing recoveries suggest that the wintering population is from central/eastern Europe.

With Colin Raven, Callion describes the pioneering northward spread into Cumbria and beyond of the once ‘recent’ Mediterranean passerine, the Cettis Warbler. They found, that most of this colonization happens after the annual post-breeding moult, when, mostly juvenile females disperse into new territories. Again, with Raven in 2025, they describe in great detail the dynamic re-colonisation of the Nuthatch in Cumbria, a species that was clinging on at the northern limits of its breeding ranges now has an estimated 6000 pairs. They speculate that anthropogenic support through nest box provision and winter garden feeding are factors involved.

== British Trust for Ornithology National Conference 2025 ==
In 2025 Callion presented his ‘Dotterel Days' to the British Trust for Ornithology National Conference, highlighting his many years on the Cumbria Fells in search of this elusive species. He also described his interest in birds and their nests, from seeing a Robin's nest on the banks of the River Derwent, before continuing for 70 years in search of nests in support of the BTO Nest Recording Scheme.
