= David Norman (ornithologist) =

British Chartered Physicist and ornithologist

Professor David Norman
- Born: 1949 (age 76–77)
- Occupations: Chartered Physicist, academic
- Known for: Ornithology
- Website: davidnorman.org.uk

David Norman (born 1949) is a British Chartered Physicist and ornithologist, he has lived in Cheshire since 1978.

== Physics ==
Professor Norman is a former director of synchrotron radiation, Council for the Central Laboratory of the Research Councils, Daresbury Laboratory. He was a visiting professor in surface science at the University of Liverpool.

== Ornithology ==
Since 2005, he has been an independent member of the United Kingdom's Rare Breeding Birds Panel and he is a member of the RSPB Council, and chairman of the Merseyside Ringing Group. He is an honorary research associate of the Carnegie Museum of Natural History, spending up to a month each year at their Powdermill Nature Reserve.

He served on the council of English Nature from 1996 to 2002 (and in September 2000 became interim acting chairman for six months). He has been chairman of the Cheshire Wildlife Trust and a member of the Editorial Board for Ornithology's journal Ringing & Migration. He was the founder chairman of the Mersey Estuary Conservation Group and Research Committee of the Liverpool Bay Wader Study Group.

In 2002, he was awarded the British Trust for Ornithology's Bernard Tucker Medal "for his outstanding scientific contributions in surveying, nest-recording and ringing birds".

== Bibliography ==
- Norman, David; Norman Arlott (1994). The Fieldfare. London: Hamlyn. pp. 127p. ISBN 0-600-57961-1.
- BTO Migration Atlas (texts on common tern, wood warbler and common chaffinch)
- Birds in Cheshire and Wirral, Liverpool University Press, 2008 ISBN 978-1-84631-152-9
  - On behalf of the Cheshire and Wirral Ornithological Society

=== Papers ===
- Various, on waders on the Mersey Estuary, fieldfares, common terns, little terns, wood warblers, common firecrests and bramblings
