= Raymond Duncan =

Raymond Duncan or Ray Duncan may refer to:

- Raymond Duncan (dancer) (1874–1966), American dancer, artist, poet, craftsman, and philosopher
- Raymond Duncan (entrepreneur) (1930–2015), American entrepreneur and vintner
- Raymond Duncan (ornithologist), Scottish ornithologist
