= Robert Francis Ruttledge =

- Born: 11 September 1899; Erin Dale, Mortarstown Upper, County Carlow, Ireland
- Died: 13 January 2002 (aged 102); Greystones, County Wicklow
- Scientific career
- Fields: Ornithology
- Military career
- Allegiance: British India
- Branch: British Indian Army
- Service years: 1918-1921, 1921-1939
- Rank: Lieutenant, Major
- Units: 34th Prince Albert Victor's Own Poona Horse, 7th Poona Horse
- Conflicts: World War I
- Awards: Military Cross

Robert "Robin" Francis Ruttledge MC (11 September 1899 – 13 January 2002) was an Irish ornithologist and soldier also known as "The Major", who is best remembered for his work in the systematic recording and conservation of Irish birds over a period of sixty years.

== Life ==
Robert Francis Ruttledge was born in Erin Dale, Mortarstown Upper, County Carlow on 11 September 1899. He was the eldest son of Thomas Henry Bruen Ruttledge and his second wife Mary Caroline (née Browne-Clayton). Ruttledge grew up in County Mayo, at the family home of Bloomfield House. He attended Marlborough College and later the Quetta cadet college, India. Ruttledge married Mabel Rose (née Burke) in 1928, with whom he had two daughters.

== Military career ==
Ruttledge served in the British Indian Army with the regiment 34th Prince Albert Victor's Own Poona Horse from 1918 to 1921, and following that regiment's amalgamation with the 33rd Queen Victoria's Own Light Cavalry to form the 7th Poona Horse, with them from 1921 to 1939. He served during the 1919 Waziristan campaign, and was awarded the Military Cross. His citation was:

For gallantry and devotion on 21 November 1919, between Jatta and Murtaza Posts, when, after a brisk engagement, the troops under the command of Captain Byrne were ordered to retire. Lieutenant Ruttledge, observing that three dismounted men were in difficulty getting a wounded man away, and realising that the retirement would be delayed, galloped back in face of heavy fire, took the wounded man on his horse, and carried him to a place of safety.

He also served with the Poona Horse during the operations on the North West Frontier 1930–31. He was appointed commandant of the bodyguard of the Governor of Madras from 1934 to 1939. Ruttledge was transferred to the Special Unemployed List as a Major in April 1939, but he was recalled in September 1939 to the Poona Horse at the outbreak of World War II, however he was invalided out before he returned to active service.

== Zoological work ==
Ruttledge has been described as one of the founders of Irish Ornithology, having played a key role in the observation of birds and the establishment of bird sanctuaries. Both Ruttledge and his brother William were keen naturalists. He published his first paper at age sixteen in the Irish Naturalist on the birds of Lough Carra, and went on to publish over 200 papers over his lifetime.

Ruttledge is cited as being a key figure in highlighting the decline in Ireland of the Greater white-fronted goose, which allowed for the protection of the Irish population of these birds. Ruttledge was involved in the establishment of the bird sanctuary on Saltee Islands and Cape Clear Island.

Ruttledge launched the Irish Bird Report (now Irish Birds) in 1953, and continued to edit it for 19 years. In 1961 he was awarded the Bernard Tucker Medal by the British Trust for Ornithology, and an honorary doctorate from Trinity College, Dublin, in 1981. Ruttledge served as the first president of the Irish Wildbird Conservancy (now BirdWatch Ireland), with the Greater white-fronted goose as its emblem.

== Published works ==
- Kennedy, P.J., Ruttledge, Robert F., and Scroope, C. F. (1954) The Birds of Ireland
- Ruttledge, Robert F. (1966) Ireland's birds: their distribution and migrations
- Cabot, David and Ruttledge, Robert F. (1966) Project Mar: a provisional list of Irish wetlands of international importance, submitted to the second European meeting on wildfowl conservation, Holland, May 1966
- Cabot, David and Ruttledge, Robert F. Liquid assets: list of wildfowl wetlands in the Republic of Ireland of national and international importance
- Ruttledge, Robert F. (1975) A list of the birds of Ireland
