= Philip Bury Duncan =

British museum curator (1772–1863)

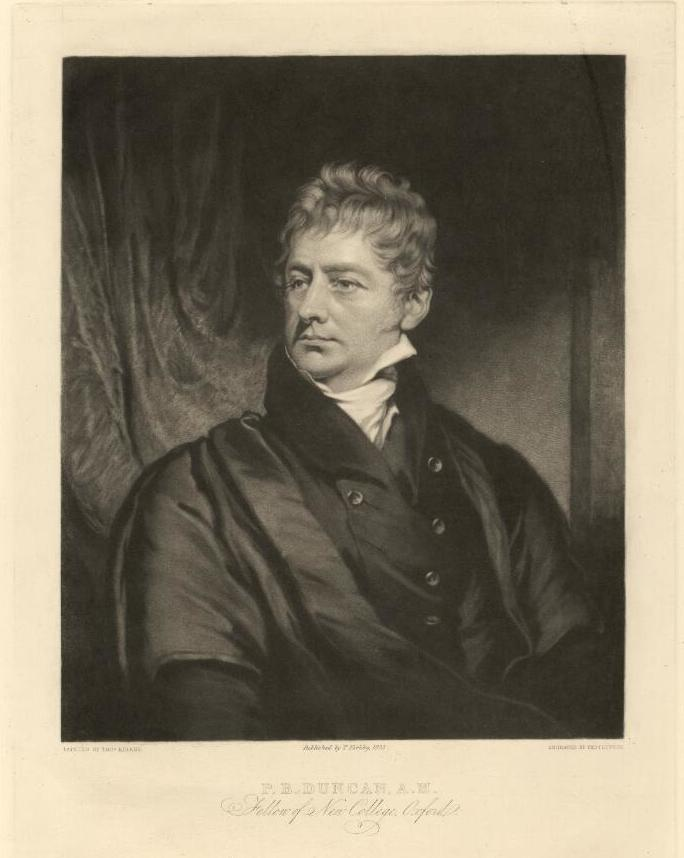
- Portrait of P. B. Duncan
- Born: 1772; South Warnborough, Hampshire, England
- Died: 12 November 1863 (age 91); Westfield Lodge, near Bath, Somerset, England
- Education: Winchester College; New College, Oxford
- Occupation: Museum curator
- Employer(s): New College, Oxford; Ashmolean Museum
- Known for: Keeper of the Ashmolean Museum
- Father: John Shute DD
- Relatives: John Shute Duncan (brother)

Philip Bury Duncan (1772–1863) was Keeper of the Ashmolean Museum at the University of Oxford.

== Life ==
Philip Duncan was born in 1772 at South Warnborough, Hampshire, England, where his father was rector. He was educated at Winchester College (where he afterwards founded the Duncan Prizes), and at New College, Oxford, of which he became a Fellow in 1792. He graduated with a B.A. degree in 1794 and an M.A. degree in 1798. Among the school and college friends with whom he continued contact were Archbishop William Howley, Bishop Richard Mant, and Sydney Smith.

Duncan was called to the bar in 1796, and for a few years attended the home and the western circuits. From 1801 until his death, he lived for much of the time at Bath and promoted many local scientific and philanthropic schemes. He was elected president of the Bath United Hospital in 1841.

In 1826, Philip Duncan was made keeper of the Ashmolean Museum, in succession to his elder brother, John Shute Duncan, author of Hints to the Bearers of Walking Sticks and Umbrella, anonymous, 3rd edition 1809; Botano Theology, 1825; and Analogies of Organised Beings, 1831. He increased the Ashmolean zoological collections, and he himself gave many donations. He also presented the University of Oxford with casts of antique statues and various models. Duncan advocated the claims of physical science and mathematics to a prominent place in Oxford studies. He was instrumental in establishing at Oxford, as well as at Bath, a savings bank and a society for the suppression of mendacity. He resigned his keepership at the Ashmolean Museum in 1855 and was then given an honorary DCL degree. His time at the Ashmolean Museum saw significant changes in the natural history displays, based on "natural theology", as propounded by William Paley (1743–1805), the Archdeacon of Carlisle.

Duncan died on 12 November 1863, at Westfield Lodge, his home, near Bath, aged 91. He was unmarried.

== Character assessment ==
He was a man of simple habits and refined tastes. Archbishop Howley said of him and his brother:

I question whether any two men with the same means have ever done the same amount of good.

== Works ==
He had published in 1836 A Catalogue of the Ashmolean Museum, octavo, and in 1845 had printed at considerable cost a Catalogue of the manuscripts bequeathed by Ashmole to the University of Oxford (edited by W. H. Black).

Among Duncan's other publications were:

1. An Essay on Sculpture [1830?], octavo.
2. Reliquiæ Romanæ (on Roman antiquities in England and Wales), Oxford, 1836, octavo.
3. Essays on Conversation and Quackery, 1836, duodecimo.
4. Literary Conglomerate, Oxford, 1839, octavo.
5. Essays and Miscellanea, Oxford, 1840, octavo.
6. Motives of Wars, London, 1844, octavo.

== Legacy ==
A painting of Philip Bury Shute by William Smith (active 1813–1859) is in the collection of the Ashmolean Museum. The Magdalen College archives include letters from Philip Bury Duncan and his elder brother John Shute Duncan.

== Sources ==
Attribution

- This article incorporates text from a publication now in the public domain: Wroth, Warwick William (1888). "Duncan, Philip Bury". In Stephen, Leslie (ed.). Dictionary of National Biography. Vol. 16. London: Smith, Elder & Co. p. 172.; Endnotes:
  - Gentlemen's Magazine 1864, 3rd ser. xvi. 122–6
  - Catalogue of Oxf. Grad.
  - British Museum Catalogue
