= Reniță =

Reniță is a Moldovan surname. Notable people with the surname include:

- Alecu Reniță (born 1954), Moldovan politician
- Iurie Reniță (born 1958), Moldovan politician and diplomat

== See also ==
- Renita
