= Renita Duncan =

American politician

Member of the Georgia House of Representatives from the 147th district
- Member-elect
- Assumed office January 11, 2027
- Preceded by: Bethany Ballard

Personal details
- Born: Chicago, Illinois
- Party: Democratic
- Education: University of Arkansas Grantham; Capella University
- Website: Official website

Renita Duncan is an American politician who is a member-elect of the Georgia House of Representatives, representing the 147th district. She was elected to the Georgia House of Representatives, in the general election on November 3, 2026, unseating Republican incumbent Bethany Ballard. She supports term limits. Duncan is a retired command sergeant major of the United States Army.
