= Edward Leach (British Army officer) =

Recipient of the Victoria Cross

General Sir Edward Leach VC KCB KCVO
- Born: 2 April 1847; County Londonderry, Ireland
- Died: 27 April 1913 (aged 66); Cadenabbia, Lake Como, Italy
- Burial place: Griante Cemetery, via Independezia, Griante
- Military career
- Allegiance: United Kingdom
- Branch: British Army
- Service years: 1866–1912
- Rank: General
- Units: Royal Engineers
- Commands: 9th (Scottish) Division; Scottish Command
- Conflicts: Lushai Expedition; Second Anglo-Afghan War; Mahdist War
- Awards: Victoria Cross; Order of the Bath; Royal Victorian Order

General Sir Edward Pemberton Leach VC KCB KCVO (2 April 1847 – 27 April 1913) was an Irish officer in the British Army and a recipient of the Victoria Cross, the highest and most prestigious award for gallantry in the face of the enemy that can be awarded to British and Commonwealth forces.

== Early life ==
Leach was born in County Londonderry, Ireland on 2 April 1847. He was educated at Highgate School in England.

== Military career ==
Leach was commissioned into the Royal Engineers in 1866.

He was 31 years old, and a captain in the Corps of Royal Engineers, British Army and with Bengal Sappers and Miners (British Indian Army) during the Second Anglo-Afghan War when the following deed took place on 17 March 1879 near Maidanah, Afghanistan for which he was awarded the VC.

For having, in action with the Shinwarris near Maidanah, Afghanistan, on 17 March 1879, when covering the retirement of the Survey Escort who were carrying Lieutenant Barclay, 45th Sikhs, mortally wounded, behaved with the utmost gallantry in charging, with some men of the 45th Sikhs, a very much larger number of the enemy. In this encounter Captain Leach killed two or three of the enemy himself, and he received a severe wound from an Afghan knife in the left arm. Captain Leach's determination and gallantry in this affair, in attacking and driving back the enemy from the last position, saved the whole party from annihilation.

== Later life ==
After this incident promotion followed and he was made Commander of 24 Field Company during the Suakin Expedition in 1885. He was promoted to Major-General on 1 October 1897. From April 1900 he was General Officer Commanding Belfast in which capacity he founded the Ballykinlar training camp. He was appointed General Officer Commanding the 9th Division within Third Army Corps in Ireland on 1 April 1902, and served until 1905. Later that year, after being promoted to lieutenant general on 3 April, he was appointed General Officer Commanding-in-Chief for Scottish Command, in succession to Lieutenant General Sir Charles Tucker, where he served from 1905. to 1909 before he retired from the army in September 1912.

Leach, promoted on 31 August 1910 to lieutenant general, died in Cadenabbia, Lake Como, Italy on 27 April 1913. His younger daughter Elsie Leach became a distinguished ornithologist.

== The medal ==
His Victoria Cross is displayed at the Royal Engineers Museum, Chatham, England.

== Notes ==
Military offices
Preceded by	General Officer Commanding the 9th Division; 1902–1905	Succeeded by
Preceded by Sir Charles Tucker	GOC-in-C Scottish Command; 1905–1909	Succeeded by Sir Bruce Hamilton
