= Bernard Tucker Medal =

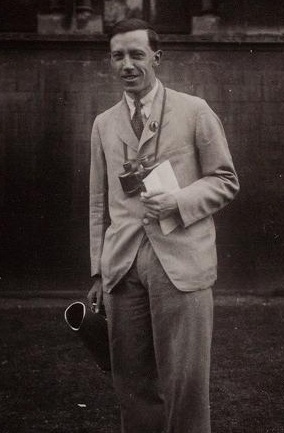
Bernard Tucker in 1934

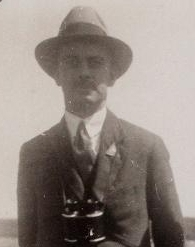
Arthur Landsborough Thompson, 1957 awardee

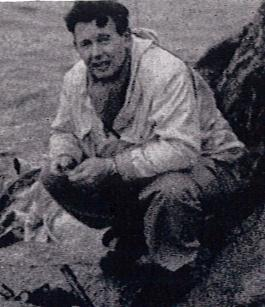
James Fisher, 1966 awardee

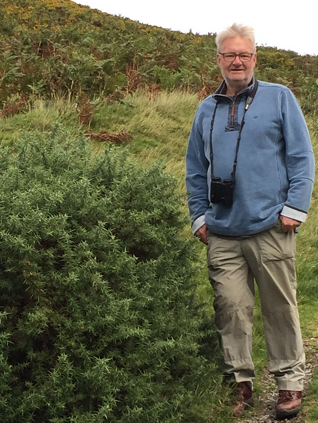
John Callion, 1996 awardee

The Bernard Tucker Medal is awarded by the British Trust for Ornithology for services to ornithology. It is named in memory of Bernard Tucker, their first Secretary. It has been awarded since 1954, usually annually although there are some years when no medals were awarded.

== Bernard Tucker Medallists ==
Medallists include:

=== 20th century ===
- 1954: Elsie P. Leach and Philip Hollom
- 1955: Wilfred Backhouse Alexander and Richard C. Homes
- 1956: John Gibb and George W. Temperley
- 1957: Ronald Hickling and Sir Arthur Landsborough Thomson
- 1958: J.A.G. Barnes and Max Nicholson
- 1959: Arnold Boyd and Tony Norris
- 1960: Bruce Campbell OBE and S. Smith
- 1961: R.F. Ruttledge and H.N. Southern
- 1962: No medal awarded
- 1963: Mrs E Barnes and Stanley Cramp
- 1964: Derek Ratcliffe
- 1965: Richard Kinahan Cornwallis
- 1966: James Fisher and Geoffrey M. Tait
- 1967: John Sidney Ash
- 1968: Susan Cowdy
- 1969: No medal awarded
- 1970: A.F.G. Walker
- 1971: S.M. Taylor
- 1972: No medal awarded
- 1973: Frank Gribble
- 1974: Mr and Mrs Joseph A. Hardman
- 1975: Clive Minton
- 1976: James Ferguson-Lees
- 1977: No medal awarded
- 1978: G.C. Lambourne
- 1979: Humphrey P. Sitters
- 1980: Mr and Mrs A.D. Wilson
- 1981: No medal awarded
- 1982: P.G. Davis
- 1983: Ronald Hickling
- 1984: No medal awarded
- 1985: G.F.A. Munns
- 1986: M. Boddy
- 1987: No medal awarded
- 1988: No medal awarded
- 1989: Geoffrey H. Gush
- 1990: John M. McMeeking
- 1991: Michael Shrubb
- 1992: P. Catchpole and Chris du Feu
- 1993: Bob Swann
- 1994: M. Adcock and G. Horne
- 1995: Brian Little
- 1996: John Callion
- 1997: Chris Mead
- 1998: Mike Harris
- 1999: Andrew G. Gosler and David G. Coker
- 2000: R. Green

=== 21st century ===
- 2001: Mark Cubitt
- 2002: David Norman
- 2003: Adrian C. Blackburn and Christopher P.F. Redfern
- 2004: Michael V. Hounsome and David Warden
- 2005: Stephen G. Dodd
- 2006: Oscar J. Merne
- 2007: Peter M. Potts, J.E.A. Brook and R.C. Cooke
- 2008: Stephen J.R. Rumsey and Raymond Duncan
- 2009: Ron A. Hoblyn
- 2010: Hugh Insley
- 2011: Michael Nicoll
- 2012: Michael Marquiss
- 2013: Anne Brenchley and Ron W. Summers
- 2014: D.M. Francis
- 2015: J. V. Lloyd
- 2016: Tom Kittle
- 2017: Ken Smith
- 2023: Dr Stephanie Tyler
- 2024: Mike Bell
- 2025: Colin McShane
- 2026: John Lawton Roberts

== See also ==
- List of ornithology awards
