= Henry Neville Southern =

English ornithologist (1908–1986)

- Born: 28 September 1908; Boston, Lincolnshire, England
- Died: 25 August 1986 (aged 77); Oxford, Oxfordshire, England
- Other names: Mick
- Education: Wyggeston Grammar School
- Alma mater: Queen's College, Oxford
- Awards: Bernard Tucker Medal of the British Trust for Ornithology (1961); Union Medal of the British Ornithologists' Union (1971); Silver Medal of The Mammal Society (1974)

Henry Neville "Mick" Southern (28 September 1908 – 25 August 1986) was an English ornithologist.

== Life ==
Born in Boston, Lincolnshire, Southern was educated at Wyggeston Grammar School, Leicester where his interest in studying birds started. He went up to Queen's College, Oxford in 1927. He studied first classics, supported by an open foundation scholarship, and then a second undergraduate degree in zoology, with a four-year gap spent working for the publishers Ward Lock.

After graduating for the second time he joined the Bureau of Animal Population at Oxford as a research scientist investigating a new technique for studying rabbits, funded by a Browne Research Scholarship. During World War II, Southern transferred to work on the control of pests, in particular the house mouse, as part of work the Animal Population Bureau took on for the Agricultural Research Council. In 1946 the Department of Zoological Field Studies in Oxford was formed from the Animal Population Bureau and the Edward Grey Institute of Field Ornithology and Mick Southern was made a Senior Research Officer. In this post he conducted a long-term (15 year) population study of the predator-prey relationships between wood-mice and bank voles, and one of their predators, the Tawny Owl. He edited The Handbook of British Mammals (1964), the journal Bird Study (1954–60) and the Journal of Animal Ecology (1968–75). He was awarded a D.Sc. from Oxford in 1972.

== Selected committee positions ==
- 1946–49 Council member for the British Ornithologists' Union
- 1962–68, 1971–74 Chairman of The Mammal Society
- 1964–67 Vice-President of the British Ecological Society
- 1965–67 Vice-President of the British Ornithologists' Union
- 1968–70 President of the British Ecological Society
- 1974–80 President of The Mammal Society

=== Awards ===
- 1961 Bernard Tucker Medal of the British Trust for Ornithology
- 1971 Union Medal of the British Ornithologists' Union, awarded for work on Tawny owls, including the 1971 Witherby Memorial Lecture
- 1974 Silver Medal of The Mammal Society
