= Elsie P. Leach =

British ornithologist and bird-ringer

- Born: 30 June 1888; Plymouth
- Died: 9 May 1968 (aged 79)
- Occupation: Ornithologist, ambulance driver, administrator
- Parent(s): Edward Leach
- Awards: Bernard Tucker Medal (1954); Member of the Order of the British Empire (1954)
- Branch: Women's Royal Naval Service

Elsie Pemberton Leach MBE (30 June 1888 – 9 May 1968) was an ornithologist and pioneer bird-ringer in Britain. She served as the founding and honorary Secretary of the British Trust for Ornithology's Bird-Ringing Committee in 1937 and continued to work on ringing until 1963.

Born in Plymouth, the younger daughter of Sir Edward Pemberton Leach, Elsie grew up in a well-connected family that moved across the United Kingdom and overseas. From an early age, she was introduced to outdoor pursuits, riding, fishing, and hunting. During the First World War, she served as an ambulance driver in the Women's Royal Naval Service, after training at the London Motor training School. An interest in birds was sparked off through her friendship with Emma Louisa Turner which led to a meeting with Harry Witherby in 1930. At that time Witherby was working on the establishment of a marking scheme for British Birds and she began to assist him immediately. She took formal responsibility for the Ringing Scheme, still in a voluntary capacity, in 1937. Her skills at ringing and care in maintaining records were well known and her memory and ability to recall recoveries helped in her work. She compiled recovery records and produced annual reports from 1938 and went on to produce them until 1951. She retired in 1953 but continued to work on ringing until 1963 when the ringing office shifted to Tring. Her work was recognised by the award of the Bernard Tucker Medal in 1954 and she was appointed a Member of the Order of the British Empire (MBE) in the 1954 Birthday Honours.

She was a member of the British Ornithologists Union from 1922, and its vice-president from 1955 to 1958.

She died on 9 May 1968. Obituaries were published in British Birds and Bird Study.
