= Stephanie Tyler =

British ornithologist, zoologist, naturalist, conservationist, and author

- Born: Lincolnshire, England

Academic background
- Education: University of Cambridge (BA, PhD)
- Thesis: Free-range ponies in the New Forest
- Doctoral advisor: Robert Hinde

Academic work
- Discipline: Zoology

Stephanie Joy Tyler MBE, also known as Steph Tyler, is a British ornithologist, zoologist, naturalist, conservationist, and author from Monmouthshire. She is particularly known for her work on Dippers and the preservation of river habitats.

== Career ==
Tyler gained her PhD in Zoology at University of Cambridge, where she also met and married Lindsay Tyler, a veterinarian. Tyler's doctoral thesis was on the free-range ponies in the New Forest. Following her marriage, Tyler moved with her family to Wiltshire where she conducted a study of the area's Grey Wagtails and became the most prolific female British bird ringer. The Tyler family moved first to the United Arab Emirates and then to Ethiopia in 1973.

In Ethiopia Tyler continued her work on bird ringing and made monthly contributions to the newsletter of the Ethiopian Wildlife and Natural History Society. Tyler also provided articles and illustrations for the conservation journal Agazen, which was used in around 2,000 schools in Ethiopia. The Tylers also led natural history tours of the area. Tyler also returned to her work on Wagtails funded by the British Ornithological Union and investigated ecological factors that affected the distribution of both local and migratory birds in Ethiopia.

From May 1976, Tyler, together with her husband and two children, were held captive for 8 months by rebels in Tigray. Despite considerable hardship, Tyler continued to make observations of local bird-life and has credited her ornithological skills with helping her family to cope with captivity. Her observations were published in the Bulletin of the British Ornithologists' Club.

On her return to the UK, Tyler and her family moved to Monmouthshire where Tyler worked for Gwent Wildlife Trust and then the Royal Society for the Protection of Birds as the Conservation Officer for Wales. From the 1980s, Tyler was a committee member of Gwent Ornithological Society, regional representative for the British Trust for Ornithology, and joint plant recorder for Monmouthshire for the South East Wales Biodiversity Records Centre.

In the 1990s, Tyler spent five years in Botswana where she worked on nest card-filling for the new BirdLife Botswana.

Tyler was a trustee of the Welsh Ornithological Society for eight years (2008–2015) and is currently the chair of the Monmouthshire Meadows Group.

In May 2026 Tyler was featured in BBC's Springwatch.

== Honours ==
- Welsh Ornithological Society Lifetime Achievement Award 2015

Tyler was appointed Member of the Order of the British Empire (MBE) in the 2021 New Year Honours for services to nature conservation in the UK and Africa.

In 2023 she was awarded the Bernard Tucker Medal of the British Trust for Ornithology.

== TV appearances ==
- Hugh's Wild West Episode 1 (Dipper observation and conservation)
- Hugh's Wild West Episode 6 (Moth trapping and study)

== Publications ==
- Tyler, Stephanie J. (1972) "Breeding Biology of the Grey Wagtail" Bird Study 19(2):69–80
- Tyler, Stephanie J. (1979) "Mortality and movements of Grey Wagtails" Ringing & Migration 2:3, 122–131
- Ormerod, Stephen J. & Tyler, Stephanie J. (1986) "The diet of Dippers Cinclus cinclus wintering in the catchment of the River Wye, Wales" Bird Study 33(1):36–45
- Co-Author The Gwent Atlas of Breeding Birds (Gwent Ornithological Society, 1987)
- O'Halloran, J., Gribbin, S., Tyler, S., & Ormerod, S. (1990). The Ecology of Dippers Cinclus cinclus (L.) in Relation to Stream Acidity in Upland Wales: Time-Activity Budgets and Energy Expenditure. Oecologia, 85(2), 271–280
- Ormerod, S., O'Halloran, J., Gribbin, S., & Tyler, S. "The Ecology of Dippers Cinclus Cinclus in Relation to Stream Acidity in Upland Wales: Breeding Performance, Calcium Physiology and Nestling Growth.” Journal of Applied Ecology, vol. 28, no. 2, 1991, pp. 419–433
- Ormerod, Stephen J. & Tyler, Stephanie J. (1993) "Further studies of the organochlorine content of Dipper Cinclus cinclus eggs: local differences between Welsh catchments" Bird Study 40(2):97–106
- Tyler, Stephanie J.; & Ormerod, Stephen J. (1994). The Dippers. Poyser: London. ISBN 0-85661-093-3
- Tyler, S.J. (1994). "The Yungas of Argentina: in search of Rufous-throated Dippers Cinclus schulzi". Cotinga. 2: 38–41.
- Tyler, Stephanie J. (1997) "First record of Basra Reed Warbler Acrocephalus griseldis in Botswana" Ostrich – Journal of African Ornithology 68(1):44–45
- Tyler, Stephanie J. (1997) "Observations on the seasonal presence and moult of European Reed Warblers Acrocephalus scirpaceus at a site in southeast Botswana" Ostrich – Journal of African Ornithology 68: 117–118
- Tyler, S.J. & Borello, W.D. (1998) Birds of Gaborone area and where to find them (Botswana Bird Club)
- Tyler, Stephanie J & Tyler, Lindsay (2001) "Biometrics and moult data for nomadic Lark-like Buntings, Emberiza impetuani, in southeastern Botswana" Ostrich – Journal of African Ornithology 72(1):118–120
- Tyler, Stephanie (2004) "The breeding and population status of the African Skimmer Rynchops flavirostris in Botswana" Ostrich - Journal of African Ornithology 75(4):329–332
- Scientific editor of Peter Hancock & Ingrid Weiersbye (2016) Birds of Botswana (Princeton University Press)
- Cumming, Graeme, Harebottle, Doug, Mundava, Josphine, Otieno, Nickson & Tyler, Stephanie (2016) "Timing and location of reproduction in African waterfowl: An overview of >100 years of nest records" Ecology and Evolution 6(3): 631–646
- Tyler, S. (2020). Gray Wagtail (Motacilla cinerea), version 1.0. In Birds of the World (J. del Hoyo, A. Elliott, J. Sargatal, D. A. Christie, and E. de Juana, Editors). Cornell Lab of Ornithology, Ithaca, N.Y., USA
