= Stanley Cramp =

British civil servant and ornithologist

Stanley Cramp OBE (24 September 1913 – 20 August 1987) was a British civil servant and ornithologist best known as the first Chief Editor of the encyclopaedic nine-volume handbook The Birds of the Western Palearctic (BWP).

Cramp was born in Stockport, Cheshire, the eldest son of Thomas and Edith Cramp. He gained a BA (Admin) in 1934 from Manchester University, studying at night school. He joined the Department of Customs and Excise in Manchester the same year and transferred to London in 1938. Apart from his war-time military service in the Royal Air Force from 1944 to 1946, he worked in London for the same Department until taking early retirement in 1970 to focus on BWP.

Cramp took up birdwatching as a boy, and serious ornithology dominated much of his life. He was active in British Trust for Ornithology (BTO) and Royal Society for the Protection of Birds (RSPB), as well as the British Ornithologists' Union (BOU), serving in various administrative positions in all three, as well as in many other bodies. He joined the editorial board of the journal British Birds in 1960 and became Senior Editor in 1963, a position he kept for the rest of his life.

He was Vice Chairman of the Council for Environmental Conservation, known as CoEnCo, under Lord Craigton, and based in London. He appointed Edward Dawson as its Chief Officer in 1977. At that time he was also senior advisor to the European Commission on the Birds Directive. His unique insight led him to develop ideas of habitat protection, to complement the original purpose of stopping song birds being gunned down as they migrated south for the winter.

For the last 17 years of his life Cramp devoted himself to producing BWP, a monumental task which ultimately affected his health. After seeing the first four volumes published, and initiating the fifth, his health deteriorated, though he continued to struggle on with the task. He died following a stroke and subsequent pneumonia.

== Honours ==
Honours awarded to Cramp include:

- 1963 – Bernard Tucker Medal of the BTO
- 1966 – Gold Medal of the RSPB
- 1975 – OBE
- 1978 – Stamford Raffles Medal of the Zoological Society of London
- 1983 – Union Medal of the BOU
