= John Shute Duncan =

British museum curator (1768–1844)

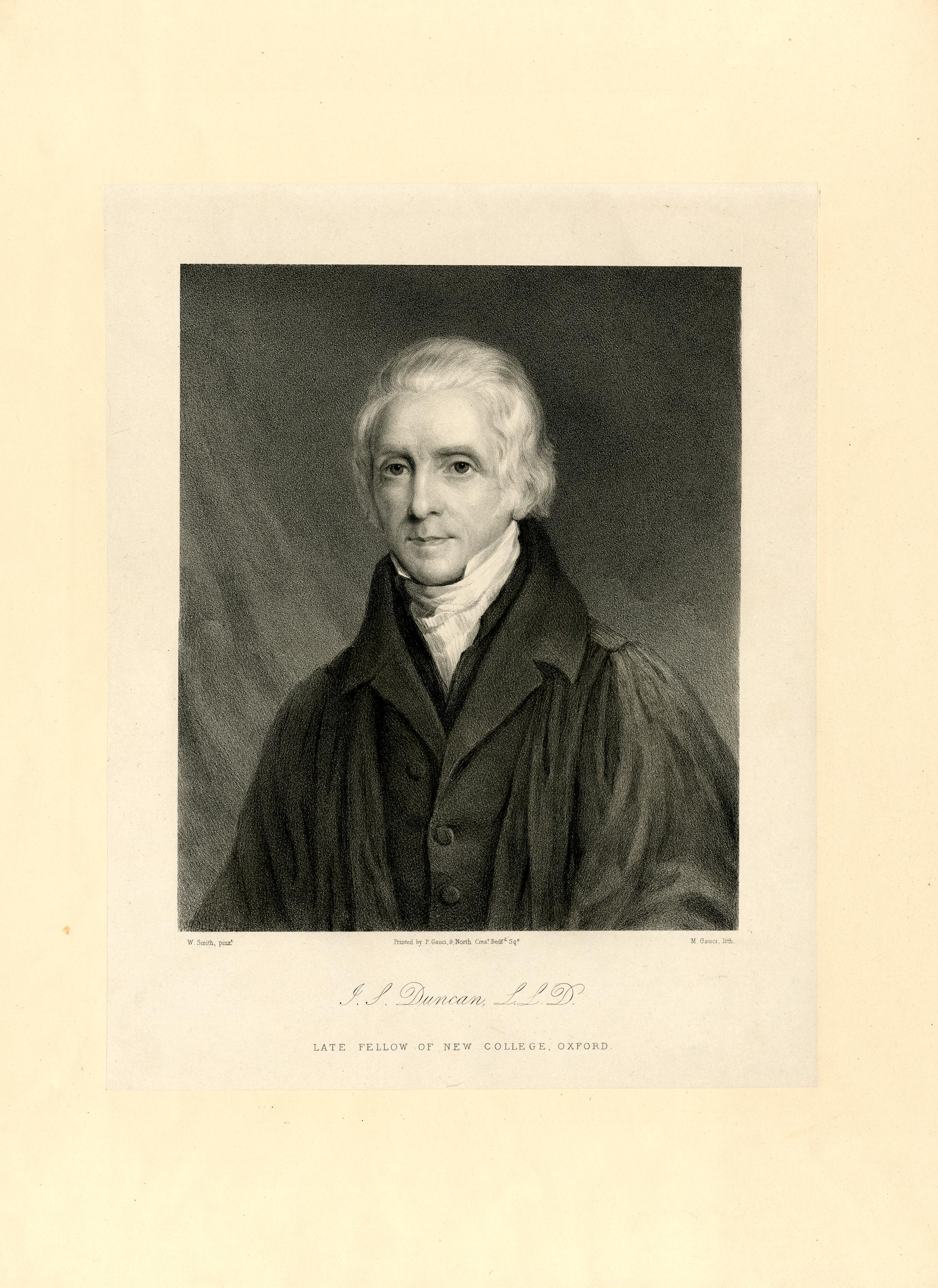
- Portrait of J. S. Duncan
- Born: 19 December 1768; South Warnborough, Hampshire, England
- Died: 1844 (aged 75–76)
- Education: Winchester College; New College, Oxford
- Occupation: Museum keeper
- Employer(s): New College, Oxford; Ashmolean Museum
- Known for: Keeper of the Ashmolean Museum
- Father: John Shute DD
- Relatives: Philip Bury Duncan (brother)

John Shute Duncan LLD (19 December 1768 – 1844) was an English academic, writer, and museum curator. He was Keeper (head) of the Ashmolean Museum at the University of Oxford.

== Life ==
John Duncan was born in 1768 at South Warnborough, Hampshire, England, the eldest son of John Duncan DD, rector of South Warnborough. He was educated at Winchester College and at New College, Oxford, of which he became a Fellow in 1791. He was awarded a BA degree in 1791 and later an LLD degree. In 1823, John Duncan was appointed Keeper of the Ashmolean Museum in Oxford. He was succeeded by his younger brother Philip Bury Duncan in 1826. His time at the Ashmolean Museum saw the start of significant changes in the natural history displays, based on "natural theology", as propounded by William Paley (1743–1805), the Archdeacon of Carlisle.

== Selected works ==
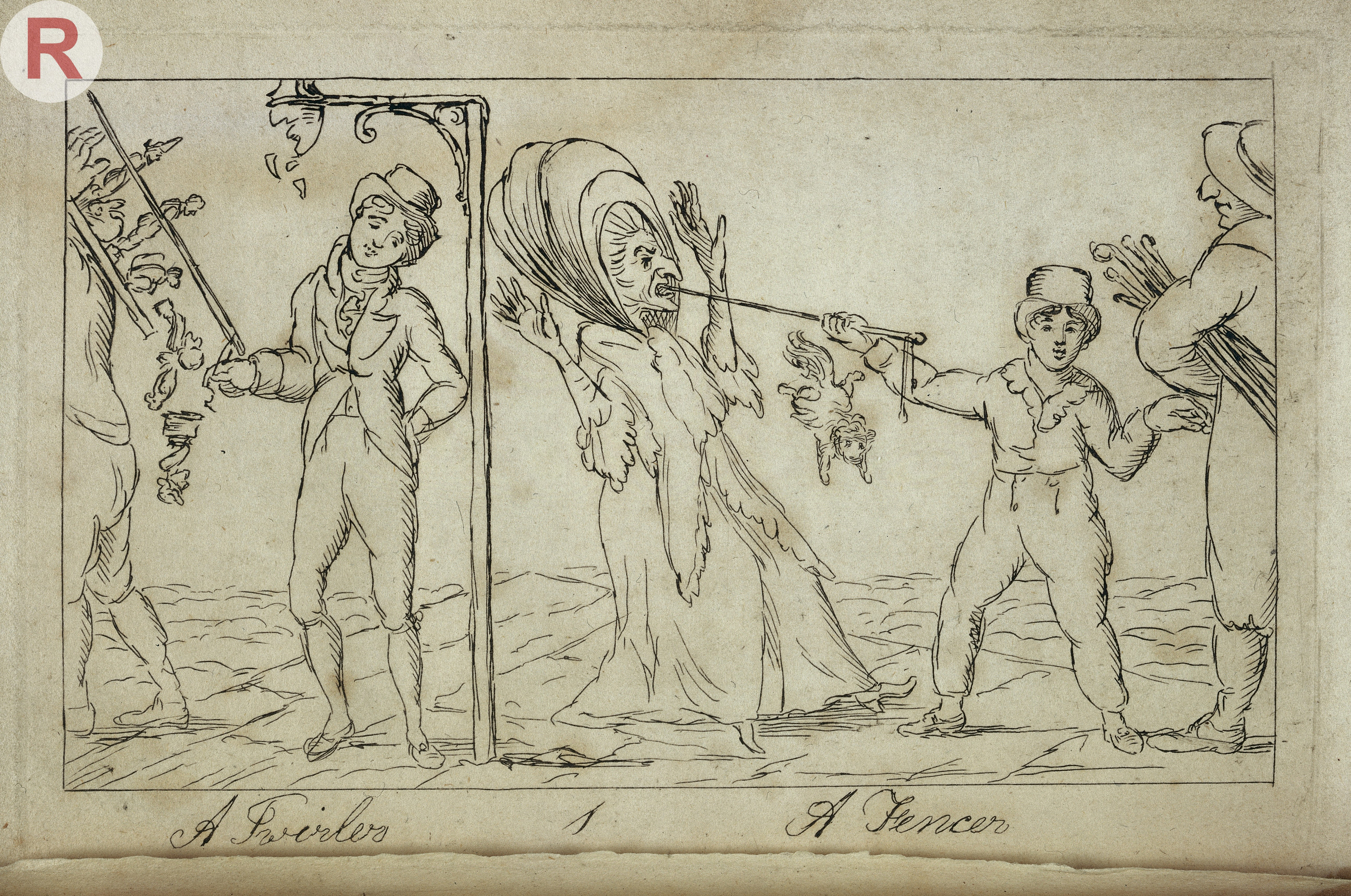
Hints to the bearers of walking-sticks and umbrellas (1809). Book illustration.

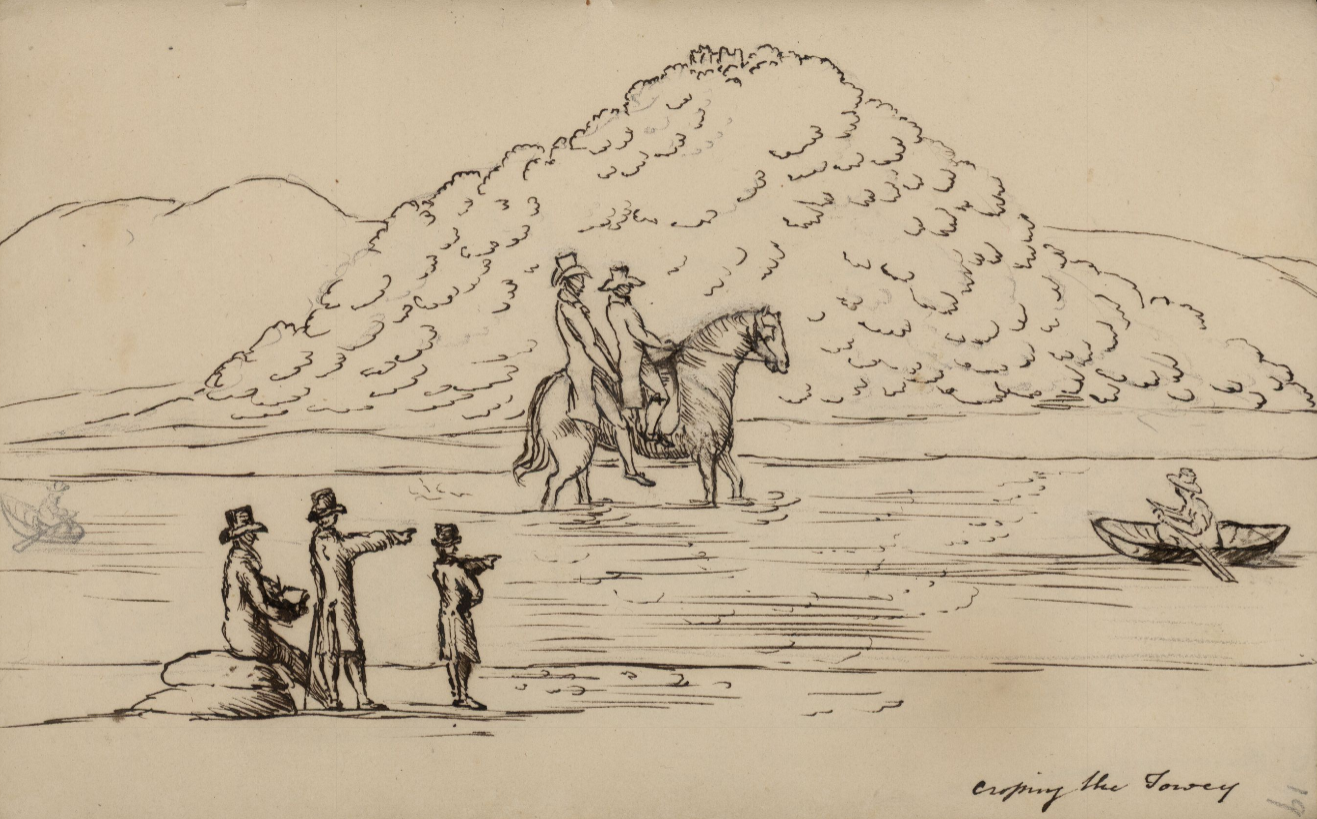
Crossing the Towey (1804). Sketch by John Shute Duncan during a tour of Wales.

John Shute Duncan wrote the following:

- Botanical Theology; or, Evidences of the existence and attributes of the deity, collected from the appearances of nature (Vincent, 1826), also by William Paley
- Collections Relative to Systematic Relief of the Poor, at different periods, and in different countries: with observations on charity, its proper objects and conduct, and its influence on the welfare of nations (printed by R. Cruttwell and sold by Murray, 1815)
- Hints to the bearers of walking-sticks and umbrellas (J. Murray, 3rd edition, 1809)
- Botano Theology (1825)
- Analogies of Organised Beings (1831)

== Legacy ==
A painting of John Shute Shute by Thomas Kirby (1775–c.1848) is in the collection of the Ashmolean Museum. The Bodleian Library archives include a memorial of the life and character of John Shute Duncan by his brother Philip Bury Duncan. The Magdalen College archives include letters from John Shute Duncan and his younger brother Philip Bury Duncan.
