= Raymond Duncan (ornithologist) =

Scottish ornithologist

Raymond Duncan is a Scottish ornithologist. He is the chairman of Grampian Ringing Group, established in 1977.

Duncan has carried out a number of studies on the migration of several bird species, most notably Bohemian waxwing, which have been colour ringed in Aberdeen since the 1980s.

He was awarded the Bernard Tucker Medal in 2008 for outstanding service to the British Trust for Ornithology.
