= Andrew Duncan =

Andrew Duncan may refer to:

- Andrew Duncan (minister, died 1626) (c. 1560–1626), Scottish minister
- Andrew Duncan (physician, born 1744) (1744–1828), Scottish pioneer for improved institutional care and treatment of mental health problems, founder of Royal Edinburgh Hospital
- Andrew Duncan (minister, born 1766) (1766–1827), Scottish minister, moderator of the Church of Scotland in 1824
- Andrew Duncan (physician, born 1773) (1773–1832), Scottish physician and professor at the University of Edinburgh
- Andrew Duncan (mayor) (1834–1880), third mayor of Christchurch, New Zealand
- Sir Andrew Duncan (businessman) (1882–1952), British businessman, MP and public official
- Andrew Duncan (poet) (born 1956), British poet
- Andrew Duncan (rugby league) (born 1972), British rugby league footballer
- Andrew Duncan (director), Canadian television director and writer
- Andrew Duncan (bowls) (born 1989), lawn and indoor bowler from Northern Ireland

== See also ==
- Andy Duncan (disambiguation)
- Duncan Andrews, drummer with the English band Heart in Hand
