= Andy Duncan =

Andy Duncan may refer to:

- Andy Duncan (footballer, born 1911) (1911–1983), Scottish footballer
- Andy Duncan (basketball) (1922–2006), American basketball player
- Andy Duncan (businessman) (born 1962), British businessman, former chief executive of Channel 4
- Andy Duncan (writer) (born 1964), American science fiction writer
- Andy Duncan (born 1975), American guitarist and keyboardist, former member of the band OK Go
- Andy Duncan (footballer, born 1977), English footballer

== See also ==
- Andrew Duncan (disambiguation)
