= Frank Duncan =

Frank Duncan may refer to:

== Sports ==
- Frank Duncan (American football) (born 1956), American football player
- Frank Duncan (catcher) (1901–1973), American baseball player and manager in the Negro leagues from 1920 to 1948
- Frank Duncan (outfielder) (1888–1958), American baseball player and manager in the Negro leagues
- Frank Duncan (pitcher) (1920–1999), American baseball player in the Negro leagues from 1941 to 1945

== Others ==
- Frank I. Duncan (1858–1946), American politician, lawyer, judge and newspaper publisher
