= John Duncan (harpist) =

British musician (1904–1998)

- Born: January 2, 1904; Derbyshire, England
- Died: June 9, 1998 (aged 94); Toronto, Canada
- Occupation(s): Harpist; Composer
- Years active: 1927–1998

John Duncan (1904–1998) was a 20th-century harpist.

== History ==
Duncan was born on 2 January 1904 in Derbyshire, England and studied harp under Thomas Archibald Wragg and Charles Collier. He moved to Canada in 1927, where in 1930 he formed a group "The Old World Musicians", for whom he composed several works.

He died in Toronto on 9 June 1998.
