= Todd Duncan (author) =

American author, keynote speaker, and business consultant

Todd Duncan is an American author, international keynote speaker, and business consultant known for his work on trust-based sales, leadership development, and relationship-driven business practices. He is the creator of the High Trust Selling methodology and a three-time New York Times bestselling author. Duncan founded The Duncan Group, a consulting and sales training company, in 1992.

According to CNN, Duncan has been described as "the Tony Robbins of the mortgage industry." Over the course of his career he has delivered keynote presentations and leadership programs internationally for corporate audiences, professional associations, and industry conferences.

Duncan is the author of 17 books, including the New York Times bestsellers Time Traps: Proven Strategies for Swamped Sales People and High Trust Selling: Make More Money In Less Time with Less Stress. His book The $6,000 Egg: The 10 New Golden Rules for Customer Service focuses on customer loyalty and referral-based growth.

Duncan was listed in the top one percent of the mortgage industry by the time he was age 27.

Duncan is also the host of the annual Sales Mastery event, a professional development conference focused on sales performance, leadership, and personal growth.

== Career ==
Duncan began his career as a loan officer in the mortgage industry before transitioning into sales training, consulting, and leadership education. In 1992 he founded The Duncan Group, which provides consulting, keynote speaking, and professional development programs focused on trust-based sales strategies and leadership development.

Duncan later developed the High Trust Selling framework, a sales and leadership methodology centered on transparency, credibility, and long-term client relationships.

In addition to his speaking and publishing work, Duncan is a co-founder of FUEL Inc., a performance-as-a-service learning platform designed to deliver digital coaching and training for sales teams and leadership organizations. The platform incorporates artificial intelligence to provide interactive learning environments and enable subject-matter experts to scale their intellectual property through digital coaching systems.

== Publications ==
- The Power To Be Your Best: Creating and Maintaining the Life You Deserve (Thomas Nelson, 1998)
- Wealth Strategies: Nine and One Half Steps to Achieving Financial and Spiritual Abundance (Thomas Nelson, 2000)
- Closing The Gap: Over 40 Ways to Get From Where You Are to Where You Want to Be (Thomas Nelson, 2000)
- Life by Design: Building the Future of Your Dreams (Thomas Nelson, 2002)
- High Trust Selling: Make More Money In Less Time With Less Stress (Thomas Nelson, 2002)
- Time Traps: Proven Strategies For Swamped Sales People (Thomas Nelson, 2004)
- Time Traps: Proven Strategies For Swamped Business Professionals (Thomas Nelson, 2004)
- Sales Motivation: Great Quotes to Fuel Your Passion (Simple Truths, 2005)
- Who Stole My Sale: 23 Ways To Close The Deal (Thomas Nelson, 2006)
- Killing The Sale: 10 Fatal Mistakes Sales People Make and How to Avoid Them (Thomas Nelson, 2007)
- Life On The Wire: Avoid Burnout and Succeed In Work and Life (Thomas Nelson, 2010)
- The $6,000 Egg: The 10 New Golden Rules Of Customer Service (Simple Truths, 2015)
- 5 Stars: Building High Ratings and High Trust in the Digital Age (Simple Truths, 2016)
- 10 Golden Rules of Customer Service (Sourcebooks, 2019)
