= Warren W. Duncan =

American judge

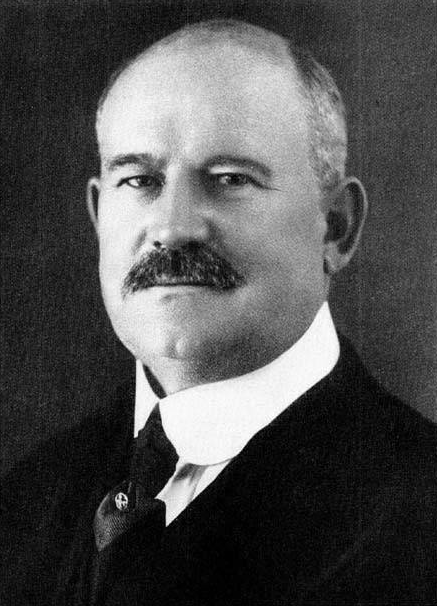

Justice of the Illinois Supreme Court
- In office 1915–1933

Personal details
- Born: Warren Webster Duncan; January 21, 1857; Jeffersonville, Illinois, U.S.
- Died: April 11, 1938 (aged 81); Marion, Illinois, U.S.
- Political party: Republican
- Occupation: Jurist

Warren Webster Duncan (January 21, 1857 – April 11, 1938) was an American jurist.

Born near Jeffersonville, Illinois, Duncan received his bachelor's degree from Ewing College. He then studied law and received his law degree from Saint Louis University School of Law. Buncan was admitted to the Illinois bar in 1885 and practiced law in Marion, Illinois. Duncan served on the Williamson County, Illinois Board of Education and was a Republican. He served as an Illinois circuit court judge and on the Illinois Appellate Court. Duncan served on the Illinois Supreme Court from 1915 until his retirement in 1933. Duncan died at his home in Marion, Illinois.
