= Pippa Duncan =

British Royal Navy captain

Captain Pippa Duncan
- Military career
- Allegiance: United Kingdom
- Branch: Women's Royal Naval Service (1966–1993); Royal Navy (1993–?)
- Rank: Captain
- Commands: HMS Warrior

Pippa Duncan was a captain in the Royal Navy, and an officer in the Women's Royal Naval Service (WRNS). In 1990, she became the first woman to command a Royal Navy shore establishment, other than the WRNS training facility.

== Naval career ==
Pippa Duncan joined the Women's Royal Naval Service (WRNS) in 1966, and was commissioned as an officer in 1969. While as a Chief Officer in the WRNS (equivalent to a Commander in the Royal Navy), she was named as the commanding officer of the shore establishment HMS Warrior in Northwood, Middlesex. This made her the first woman, and first WRNS officer, to command a Royal Navy shore establishment other than the WRNS training establishment HMS Dauntless.

Following the merger of the WRNS into the Royal Navy in 1993, she became the Chief Naval Officer for Woman in 1997, while also being the Naval Representative for NAAFI. She competed for the Navy in golf, winning the interservice title in 1997, defeating the British Army and Royal Air Force teams with a deciding putt at a golf course in Gainsborough, Lincolnshire.
