= Stewart Duncan (philosopher) =

American philosopher

- Awards: Humanities Scholarship Enhancement Fund Grant

Education
- Education: Rutgers University (Ph.D.), University of St Andrews (M.A.)

Philosophical work
- Era: 21st century Philosophy
- Region: Western philosophy
- School: Early modern philosophy
- Institutions: University of Florida
- Main interests: Philosophy of Thomas Hobbes
- Website: http://users.clas.ufl.edu/sdrd/

Stewart Duncan is an American philosopher and associate professor of philosophy at University of Florida. He is known for his expertise on early modern philosophy, especially the materialist philosophy of Thomas Hobbes.

== Books ==
- Debates in Modern Philosophy: Essential Readings and Contemporary Responses (Routledge, 2013), edited with Antonia LoLordo, ISBN 9780415887984

== See also ==
- John Toland
- Margaret Cavendish
