= Bethany Ballard =

American politician

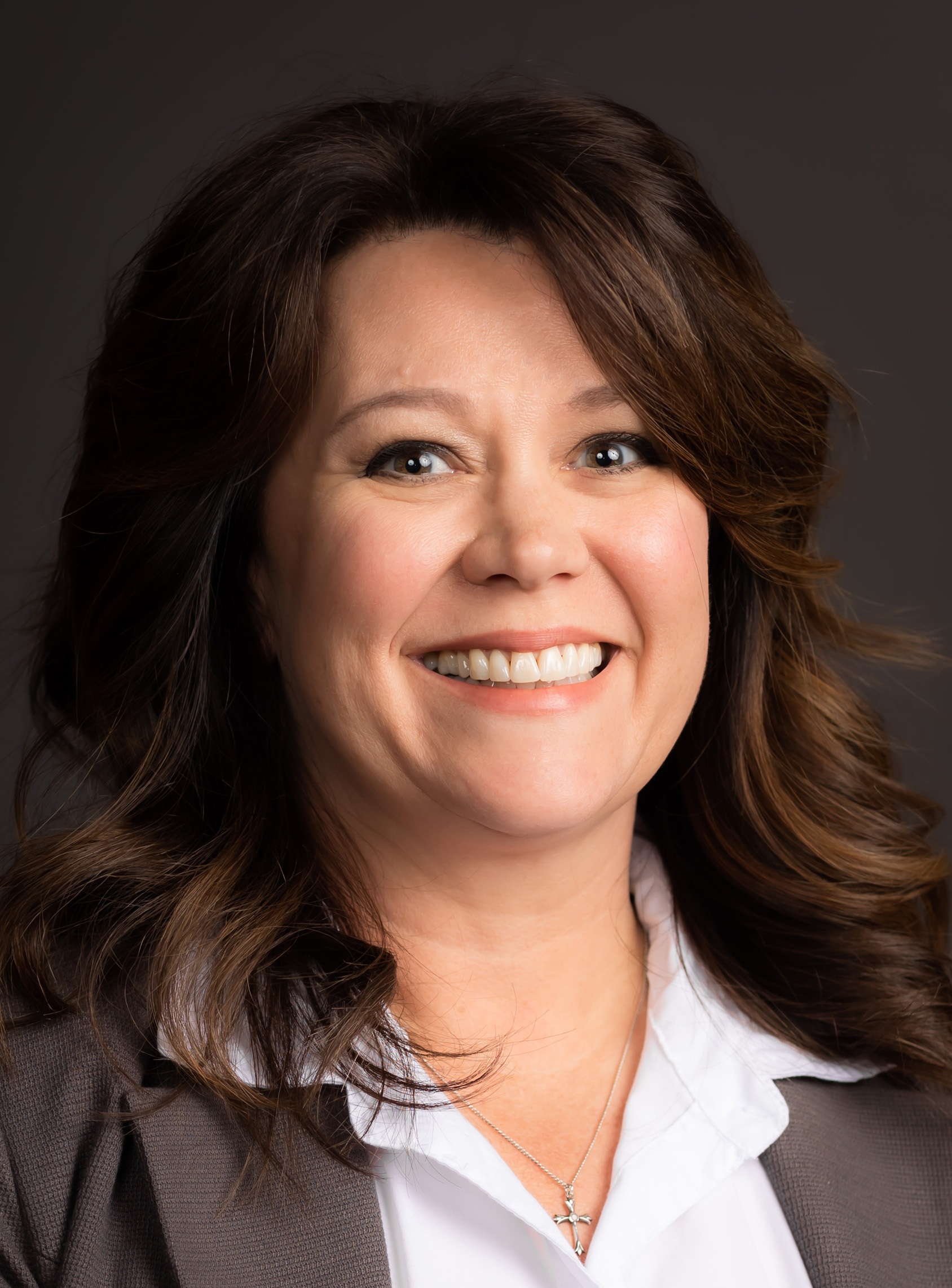
- Official headshot

Member of the Georgia House of Representatives from the 147th district
- Incumbent
- Assumed office January 9, 2023
- Preceded by: Heath Clark

Personal details
- Party: Republican

Bethany Henderson Ballard is an American politician from the Georgia Republican Party who serves as a member of the Georgia House of Representatives representing District 147.

She is a member of the Houston County Board of Elections.
