= Willie Talton =

American politician

Willie Lee Talton is an American politician who was a Republican member of the Georgia General Assembly, representing the 147th district until 2015. He is a retired chief deputy in the Houston County Sheriff's Office. He is currently the Chairman of the Special Rules Committee, the Secretary of the Juvenile Justice Committee, and a member of the Banks and Banking Committee, Education Committee, Legislative and Congressional Reapportionment Committee, Public Safety and Homeland Security Committee and the Ways and Means Committee. His education includes an Associated Degree in Education from Middle Georgia College in 1974 and a bachelor's degree in Criminal Justice from Fort Valley State University. Upon completion of the Houston County Training School in 1962, Talton began his law enforcement career with the city of Warner Robins in 1965.
