= Georgia's 147th House of Representatives district =

State district in Georgia, USA

Georgia's 147th State House of Representatives district
Representative
Bethany Ballard; R–Warner Robins
- Demographics: 56.5% White; 31.5% Black; 5.7% Hispanic; 2.2% Asian
- Population: 54,362

District 147 elects one member of the Georgia House of Representatives. It contains parts of Houston County and Peach County.

== Members ==
- Willie Talton (until 2015)
- Heath Clark (2015–2023)
- Bethany Ballard (since 2023)
