= John Edward Duncan =

New Zealand politician

The Honourable John Edward Duncan MLC
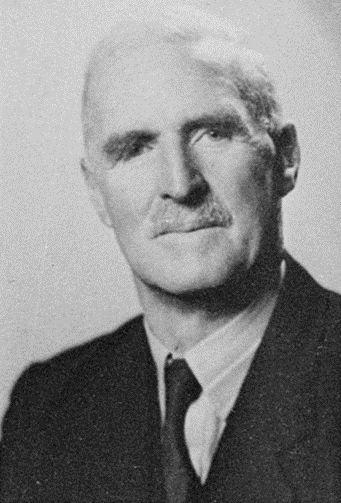

Member of the Legislative Council
- In office 22 September 1937 – 31 December 1950

Personal details
- Born: 1884 Auckland, New Zealand
- Died: 1959 (aged 74–75) New Zealand
- Party: Labour Party

John Edward Duncan (1884–1959) was a member of the New Zealand Legislative Council from 22 September 1937 to 21 September 1944; then 22 September 1944 to 31 December 1950 when the council was abolished. He was appointed by the First Labour Government.

He was from Auckland then Wharepuhunga.
