= Jonathan Duncan (swimmer) =

New Zealand swimmer

Personal information
- Full name: Jonathan Erskine Duncan
- Nationality: New Zealand
- Born: 16 May 1982 (age 44) Lae, Morobe, Papua New Guinea
- Height: 1.81 m (5 ft 11 in)
- Weight: 83 kg (183 lb)

Sport
- Sport: Swimming
- Strokes: Freestyle
Medal record
Representing New Zealand
Oceania Swimming Championships
Gold medal – first place	Christchurch 2000	400m Freestyle
Gold medal – first place	Christchurch 2000	1500m Freestyle

Jonathan Duncan (born 16 May 1982 in Lae, Papua New Guinea) is a swimmer from New Zealand, who competed at the 2000 Summer Olympics in Sydney, in the 200, 400 and 1500m freestyle.

Duncan then went on to complete a bachelor of business degree at Massey University in Auckland in 2004. In 2005, Jonathan started his Master of Entrepreneurship programme at the University of Otago and started working for software company Siliconcoach. During this time the Academy Cinema in Dunedin, New Zealand was established with business partner Jeffrey Broughton.

In 2006 Duncan relocated to Edinburgh, Scotland to work as Business Development Manager for Siliconcoach and work on other business initiatives.
