= South Warnborough =

Village and parish in Hampshire, England

Coordinates: 51.221305°N 0.966875°W

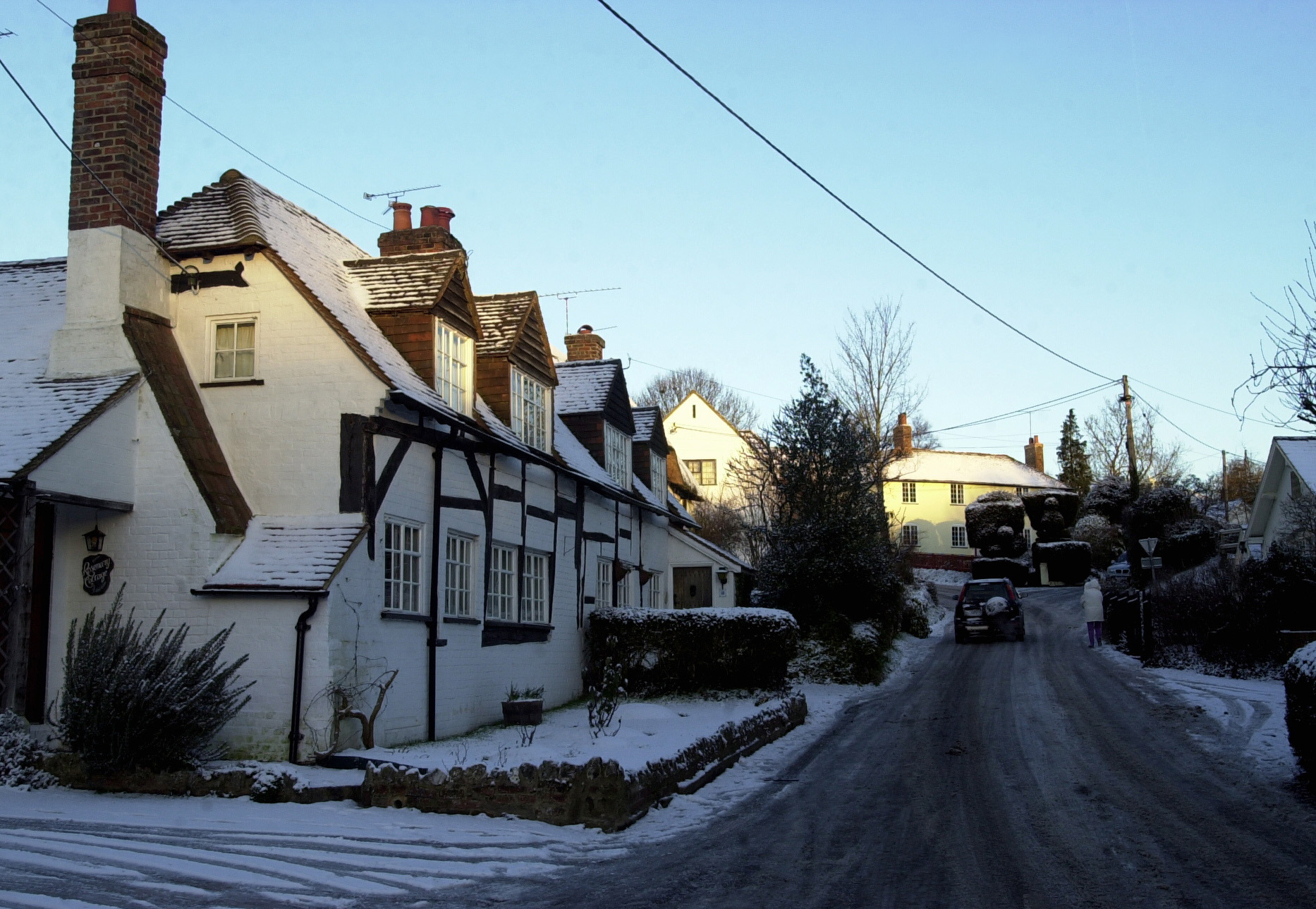
- Lees Hill in winter

- Location within Hampshire
- OS grid reference: SU7219347360
- Civil parish: South Warnborough
- District: Hart
- Shire county: Hampshire
- Region: South East
- Country: England
- Sovereign state: United Kingdom
- Post town: HOOK
- Postcode district: RG29
- Dialling code: 01256; 01276
- Police: Hampshire and Isle of Wight
- Fire: Hampshire and Isle of Wight
- Ambulance: South Central
- UK Parliament: North East Hampshire

South Warnborough (grid reference SU722473) is a small village and civil parish in the English county of Hampshire. In the 2001 census, the population was 407. In the 2016 census, the population was estimated to be 509.

South Warnborough is approximately 3 miles (4.8 km) south of the village of Odiham and 6 miles (9.7 km) north of the town of Alton. Other neighbouring settlements include the villages of Upton Grey to the west and Long Sutton to the east.

== Geographic location ==
The parish rises southwards from the valley of the River Whitewater to the North Downs at over 700 feet (210 m) – the highest point in the Hart district. The undulating countryside is unspoilt and the village contains old brick and half-timbered cottages, many under thatch.

== Village amenities ==
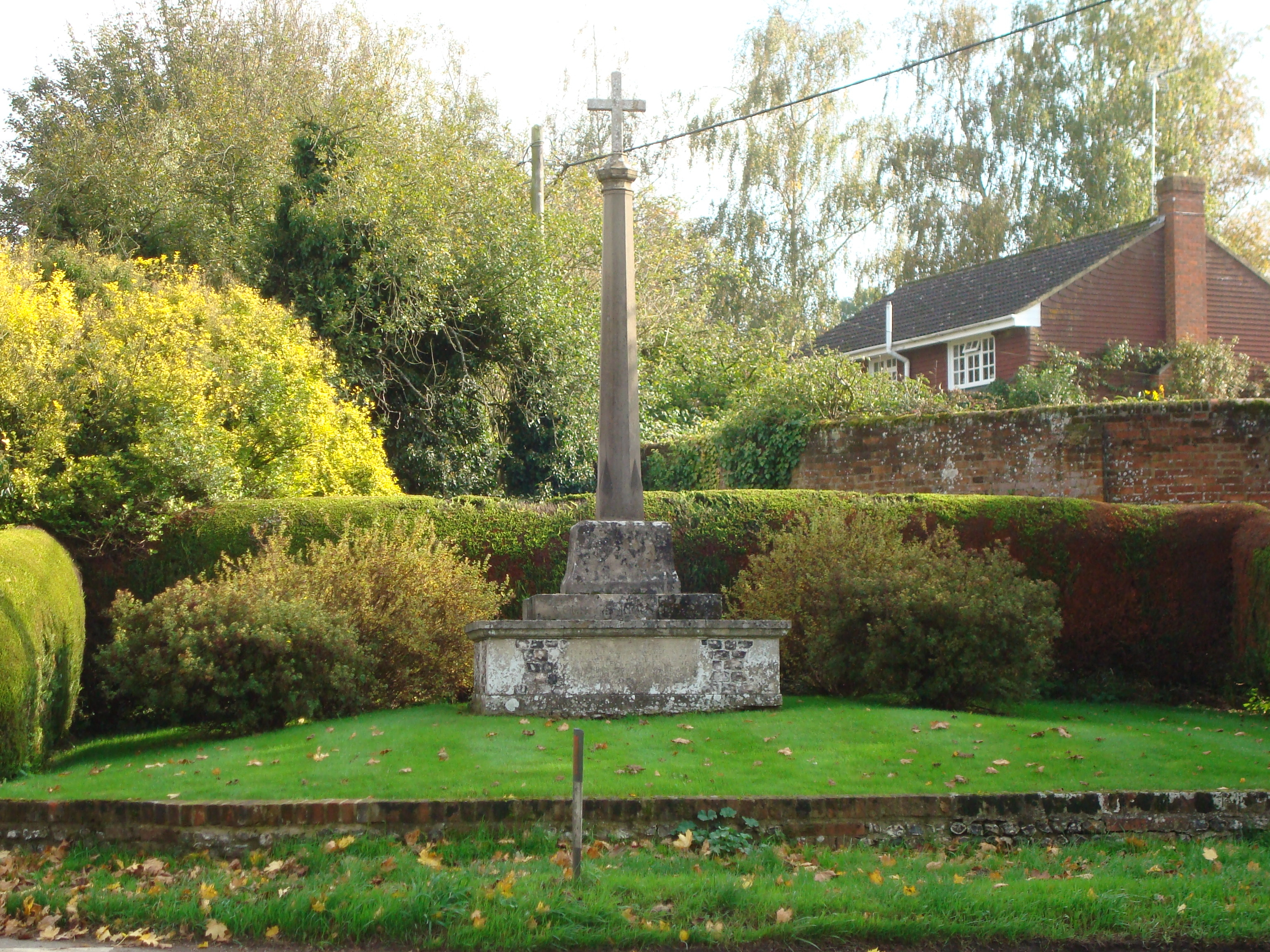
The war memorial

The parish has a pub, The Poacher, a popular village shop and post office, Street Farm House, a beautiful Jacobean house, the 12/13th century Norman Church of St Andrew and a village playground managed by the playground committee. There is also a war memorial at the centre of the village. A small business unit and car repair garage is located on the southern edge of the village. In the centre of the village, there is the Ridley Hall, a small village hall that hosts village social occasions and events.

== History ==
The name derives from "(æt) Weargeburnan", apparently the Old English name for the river Whitewater and meaning "felon stream", i.e. "the stream where felons are drowned".

=== Domesday Book ===
South Warnborough, then known as Wergeborne, was included in the Domesday Book. It was translated for the Victoria County History of Hampshire as follows: In Odingetone (Hoddington) Hundret:

The same Hugh holds Wergeborne and Guy (de Craon holds it) of him with his daughter. Bondi held it of King Edward. It was then assessed at 11 hides; now at 6 hides. There is land for 12 ploughs. In demesne are 2 ploughs and (there are) 15 villeins and 16 bordars with 6 ploughs. There are a church and 3 serfs, and a mill worth ten shillings, and 12 acres (49,000 m^{2}) of meadow. T.R.E. (in the time of King Edward) it was worth 12 pounds, and afterwards 6 pounds; and now 10 pounds

=== Church, Manor, Plough ===
In the book Church, Manor, Plough – Volume 1 of the History of South Warnborough written by John Simpson in 1946, he details a statement made on 28 September 1822 by William Cobbett who was passing through the parish on one of his 'Rural Rides' from Odiham to Winchester

We have come over roads and lanes of flint and chalk. The weather being dry again, the ground under you, as solid as iron, makes a great rattling with the horses feet. The country where the soil is stiff loam upon chalk, is never bad for corn. Not rich, but never poor. There is at no time anything deserving to be called dirt in the roads. The buildings last a long time, from the absence of fogs and also the absence of humidity in the ground. The absence of dirt makes the people habitually cleanly; and all along through this country the people appear in general to be very neat. It is a country for sheep, which are always good and sound...

=== St. Andrew's ===
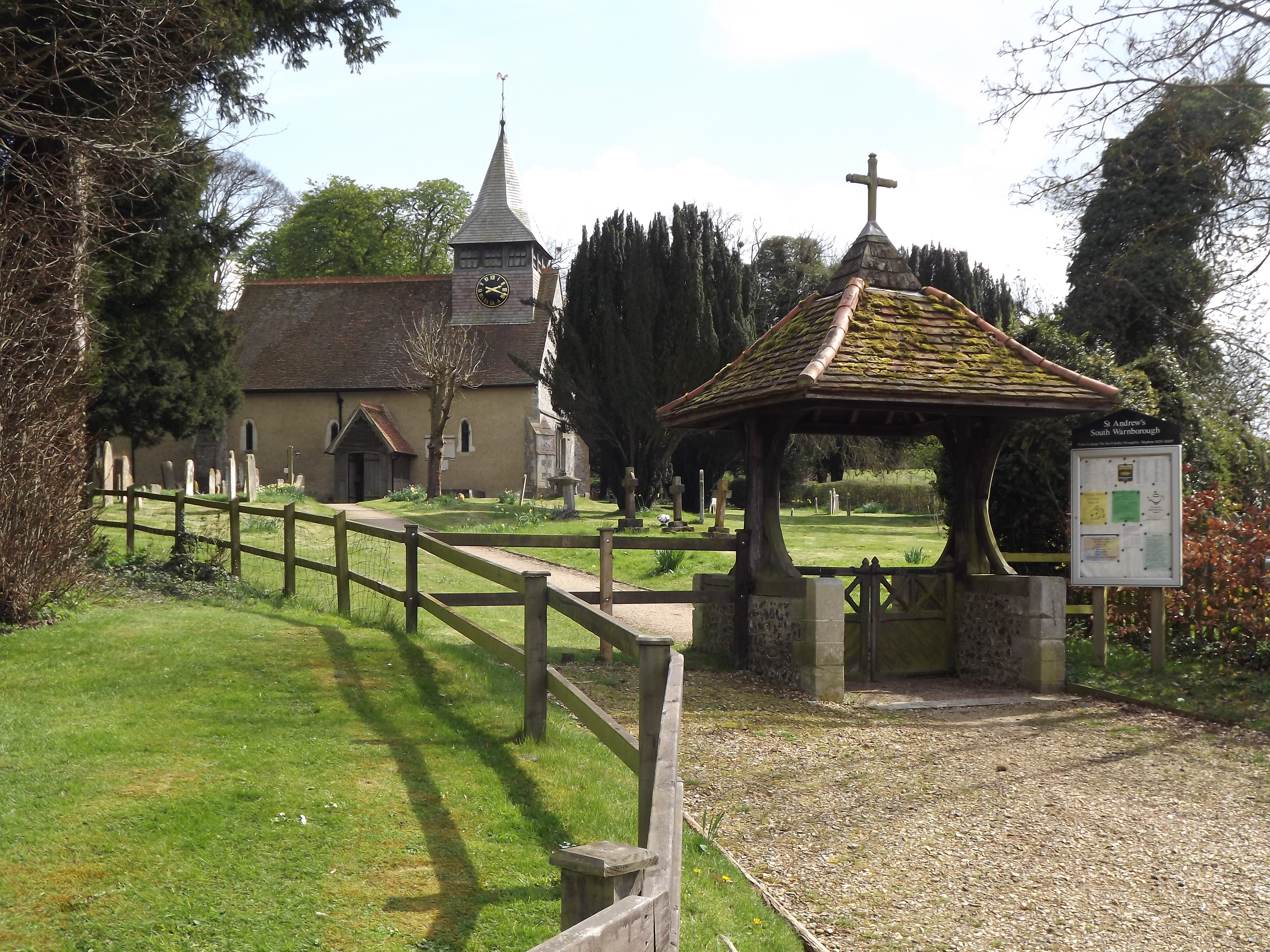
St Andrew's church

St. Andrew's church dates from the early 12th century and is a Grade II* listed building. Its walls are made of flint rubble, except for the West wall of the nave and the 19th century South aisle. Its roofs are now tiled, though in the Middle Ages they may well have been thatched. The unusual wooden bell turret at the West end is late 14th century. Inside, the roofs of the nave and chancel are of the trussed-rafter type, used in mediaeval and late mediaeval times. In its original form the church had no South aisle, which was added by the Victorian architect Street about 1870. There were, however, nave altars on either side of the chancel steps as well as the main altar at the East end.

The main doorway on the North side, with its interesting design of lozenges broken at an angle, and the West end of the nave, were built when Alan de Craon was lord of the manor. The rest of the nave and the chancel appear to have been rebuilt in the first half of the 13th century, the chancel keeping the width and perhaps some of the wall of its 12th century predecessor. Its east window is made up of three closely set stepped lancets under an enclosing arch. The single lancet windows of the nave are early 14th century, as are the windows on the south walls of the church. The large window to the left of the main altar is 16th century, though the stained glass is of a later date. One of the outstanding features of the church is the 15th century rood screen, a rare survival and now in its original position though there was a time when it was used under the belfry where it formed a gallery. Its supporting arches are of a later date. St. Andrew's is rich in monuments and heraldry, particularly of the Whyte family. To the left of the main altar there is a large altar tomb, probably not in its original position, bearing the Whyte arms – the three popinjays – on shields set on a four-leafed design (quatrefoils).

Although the South aisle was built in the 19th century, there is to the right of its altar an early 12th century volute capital and shaft possibly of the same date as the nave walls. The chief interest of the South aisle is in the 16th century heraldic glass. On the window behind the altar are represented the three feathers of Wales twice and the Tudor Rose once, probably for Prince Arthur, the elder brother of Henry VIII, and also the emblems of Katherine of Aragon who stayed at Dogmersfield when she first arrived in England to marry Arthur.

In the window to the right there are four panels. The top left hand is dated 1599 and shows the Whyte popinjays; the other three shields are encircled by garters and are from the first half of the 16th century; they include the quartered shield of Thomas Wriothesley, first earl of Southampton who had served with Sir Thomas Whyte on a Commission for disposing of Church plate at the Reformation; his grandson, the 3rd Earl, was the patron of the Elizabethan poets, and in particular of Shakespeare.

=== Manor ===
At the Norman Conquest, William the Conqueror granted the manor of Wergeborne (South Warnborough) to one of his great Norman barons, Hugh fitzBaldric. Hugh gave the manor and the living of St. Andrew's Church which went with it, to his daughter on her marriage to Guy de Craon. Their son Alan, grandson Maurice and great-grandson Guy continued as lords of the manor but the living of St Andrew's, with land and woods, was granted by Alan to Freiston Priory, a sub-cell of the renowned Crowland Abbey in Lincolnshire, in which county the de Craons also had lands.

Elizabeth I came to South Warnborough from Basing House on 21 September 1601 and dined with Richard White (died 1613). She knighted him, and made his wife a lady in waiting.
