= John Riley Duncan =

US law enforcement officer

John Riley Duncan (September 25, 1850 – November 16, 1911) was a Texas lawman with service as a Dallas police officer, Texas Ranger, and detective. He is most well known for his significant contributions to the capture of John Wesley Hardin.

== Biography ==
=== Early life ===
Duncan was born on September 25, 1850, and raised in a small farming community in Hardin County in north-central Kentucky. His father, James, was 23 and his mother, Katherine, was 21. He and his brothers tended to the family's farm while his father served in the Confederate Army during the Civil War. After the war, the family engaged in several business ventures in addition to farming that failed to prosper; young Duncan tried his hand at running a small saddler's shop. The family decided to move to Texas, ultimately settling in the vicinity of Dallas. By 1875 the Duncan family was well established in the bustling, frontier community, and Duncan and his father were employed as butchers while one of his brothers was in the land business. At that time Dallas was a rowdy city of 10 thousand people with a police force of about 10 or 11 officers. Duncan joined the police force in October 1876 and rapidly acquired the reputation as being an effective lawman. However, most of his duties were rather mundane, ranging from arresting drunks and minor criminals to controlling the city's large population of feral dogs.

=== "Got Wes Hardin" ===
The effort to bring the state's most infamous criminal—Wes Hardin—to justice intensified during this time. Because Hardin had considerable support from family and friends, the Texas Rangers' strategy involved collecting information through undercover detectives. Duncan was recruited into the Texas Rangers in July 1877 specifically to help track down Hardin by working undercover, gathering information in Gonzales County, TX, where both Hardin and his wife had considerable family. Duncan obtained information tracking Hardin to a rural community in southeastern Alabama, near the Florida border. Continuing his undercover work there, Duncan obtained more detailed information about Hardin's whereabouts; he was on a gambling spree in nearby Pensacola, FL.

With the cooperation of local law officers, a railroad official, and a local judge, an ambush was set up in the smoking car of a train that Hardin and several of his friends had recently purchased tickets for. Although some of the local officers knew Hardin through his alias, only the Texas Rangers knew of his true identity. The ambush included Escambia County, FL, Sheriff William Henry Hutchinson, Deputy A. J. Perdue, some recently deputized citizens, and Texas Rangers Duncan and Lieutenant John Barclay Armstrong, who was in charge of the overall operation. All were located in strategic positions in and around the train, which was awaiting departure from the Pensacola station.

Hardin was subdued after a melee, which most likely involved Hutchinson, Perdue, and perhaps another deputy initially, but was ended when Armstrong knocked Hardin unconscious with his revolver. Duncan was probably a late comer to the location of Hardin's capture because his post was outside the railroad car. One of Hardin's companions, Jim Mann, was killed while attempting to flee. It is uncertain who killed Mann as many shots were fired; some accounts stated that Armstrong fired the fatal shot. Guarded by Duncan and Armstrong, Hardin was transported by train back to Texas to stand trial; he served 17 years in prison for his crimes.

=== After the limelight ===
Duncan ended his service with the Texas Rangers after only four months. The most likely reason for this short tenure was the lucrative rewards that could be collected for capture of wanted criminals—being a bounty hunter. Duncan's reasoning was no doubt supported by his share of the $4,000 reward paid for Hardin's capture.

Duncan's activities as a bounty hunter brought him into contact with the rougher side of Dallas society—the saloons, brothels, and gambling establishments. It was a dangerous life, which resulted in Duncan being shot by a prostitute on February 9, 1878, under rather mysterious circumstances in a Dallas brothel. Duncan's recovery was slow as the doctor was unable to locate and remove the bullet. Later complications resulting from this gunshot lead to a tracheotomy being performed to save his life. He required an inserted silver breathing tube for the remainder of his life. The difficulty the tracheotomy caused to his breathing and voice was a millstone to his life, but he was still able to effectively function as a detective and bounty hunter.

Duncan was successful as a bounty hunter. When Hardin's death in 1895 created a resurgence in interest in Duncan's career, he supplied a listing of all the "bad men" he had either captured or assisted in the capture of. The list included 21 names with a total in collected rewards of over $12,000; naturally, Hardin headed the list. However, changing times on the Texas frontier ultimately forced Duncan to seek more mundane forms of employment; later in life he worked as: Dallas Sanitation Inspector, general laborer, carpenter, hotel clerk, and as watchman for the Corps of Engineers. He married Emma Jane Bowles on October 20, 1884, in Dallas, Texas. They had four children in 13 years.

On November 16, 1911, at the age of 61, Duncan lost control of his automobile (a Brush Runabout) on a rough road south of Dallas, and died from sustained injuries or perhaps the loss of his breathing tube.

His colorful life as a western lawman was documented in a book by Rick Miller. A manuscript of the book was provided to the Duncan family who still resides in Texas. However, no pictures of Duncan appear in Miller's book. There are no known pictures of Duncan, who refused to pose because he felt photographs might compromise his undercover activities. In the 1920s a silent black and white film was created of the accounts of the Hardin arrest, titled A Man and His Horse.
