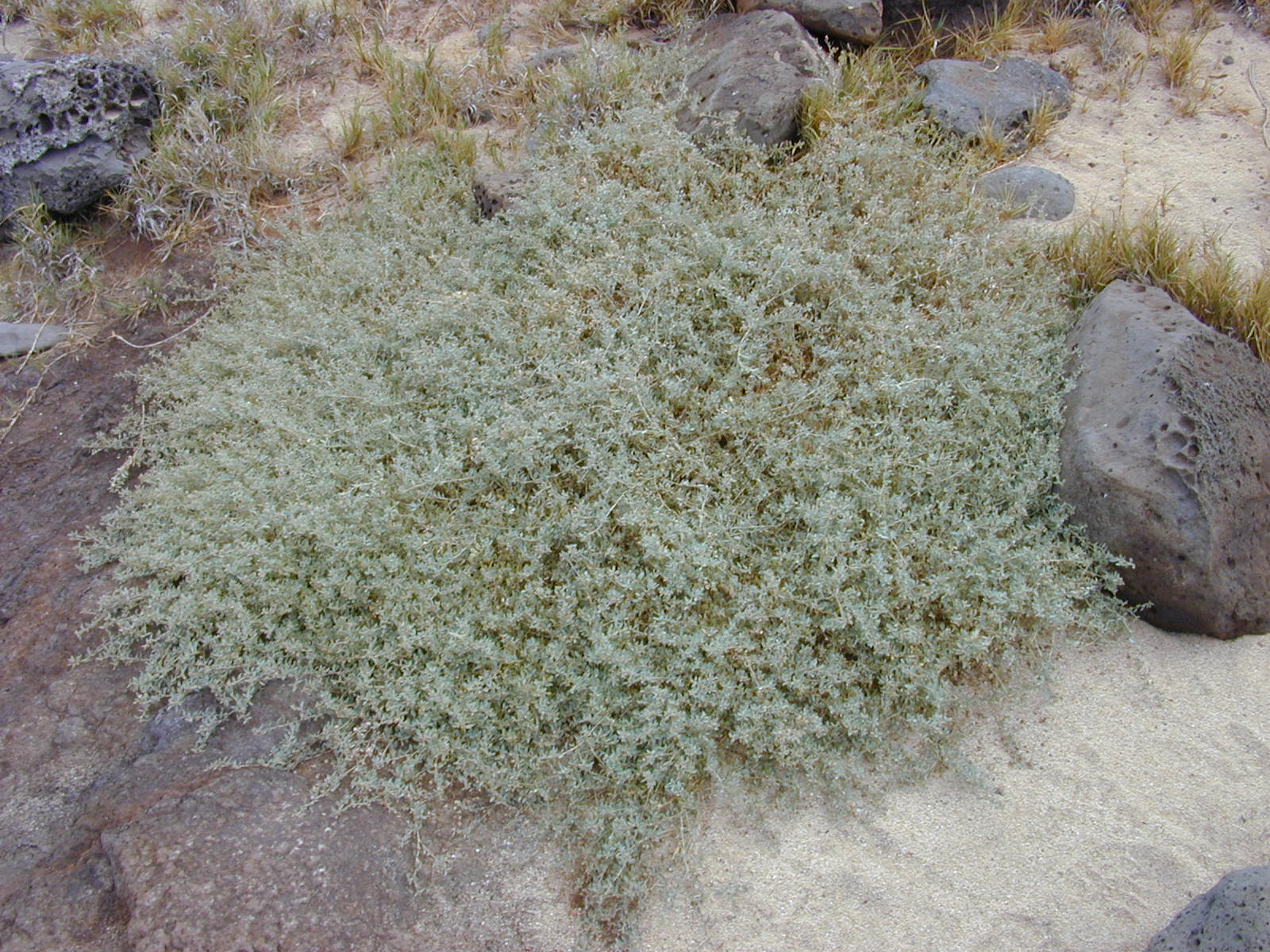

Conservation status
- Least Concern (IUCN 3.1)

Scientific classification
- Kingdom: Plantae
- Clade: Tracheophytes
- Clade: Angiosperms
- Clade: Eudicots
- Order: Caryophyllales
- Family: Amaranthaceae
- Genus: Atriplex
- Species: A. semibaccata

Binomial name
- Atriplex semibaccata R.Br.

Synonyms
- Atriplex denticulata Moq.; Atriplex flagellaris Wooton & Standl.; Atriplex neurivalvis Domin; Atriplex semibaccata var. appendiculata Aellen; Atriplex semibaccata var. biformis Aellen; Atriplex semibaccata var. gracilis Aellen; Atriplex semibaccata var. typica Aellen; Atriplex semibaccata var. melanocarpa Aellen

= Atriplex semibaccata =

Species of plant

Atriplex semibaccata, commonly known as Australian saltbush, berry saltbush, or creeping saltbush, is a species of flowering plant in the family Amaranthaceae and is endemic to Australia. It is a perennial herb native to Western Australia, South Australia, Queensland and New South Wales, but has been introduced into other states and to overseas countries. It flowers and fruits in spring, and propagates from seed when the fruit splits open. This species of saltbush is adapted to inconsistent rainfall, temperature and humidity extremes and to poor soil. It is used for rehabilitation, medicine, as a cover crop and for fodder. Its introduction to other countries has had an environmental and economic impact on them.

== Description ==
Atriplex semibaccata is a taproot perennial herb, that has prostrated and decumbent characteristics. Native to Australia and widespread in all mainland Australian states, A. semibaccata thrives in harsh and saline conditions. A. semibaccata is often mat-forming or semi-erect and can grow 40–80 cm tall, spanning a diameter of 1.5-2m. Its slender branches arise from a woody taproot.

Leaves are white scruffy, subsessile (small stalk) and are spatulate or obovate (oblong or elliptic) when the plant is young. Leaves develop a green to grey-green colour, with a length of 5-30mm and a width of 2-9mm, where the base is tapered and tip obtuse. Leaves are thin, oblong-elliptic, obtuse and have short petiolate (1–2 cm). Staminate flowers are tiny, terminal and 1.5mm wide, whereas pistillate flowers cluster distally from leaves. A. semibaccata is monoecious.

Fruiting bracteoles are red or orange when mature, as well as having a convex and rhombic shape (diamond like appearance). Fruits are succulent, united at base, margin toothed, sessile and are a length of 4-6mm.

A. semibaccata is seed propagated and seeds are dimorphic. Black seeds are 1.5-1.7mm, while brown seeds are 2mm in size. It can be used as fodder and is useful for degraded or salt affected land. Optimal conditions for habitat, include dry/subtropical climate and direct sunlight. A. semibaccata has an all-year season of interest and a plant hardiness zone of 4. A. semibaccata requires light hydration in soil that is either clay, loam, peat, sand or silt as well as a soil pH that is neutral.

== Taxonomy and naming ==
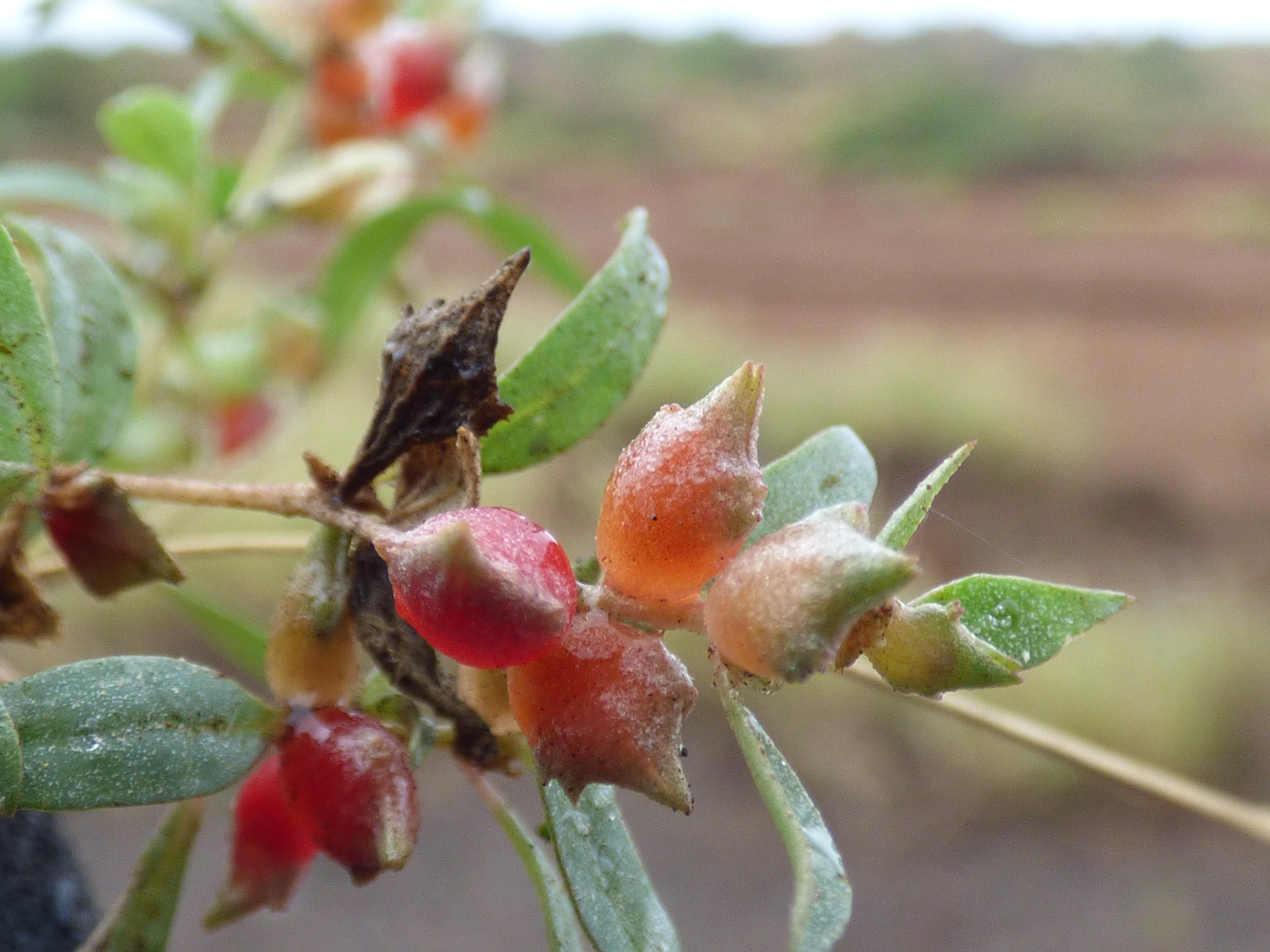
Succulent red fruits of A. semibaccata (also referred as bracteoles)

Atriplex semibaccata was first formally described in 1810 by Robert Brown in his Prodromus Florae Novae Hollandiae et Insulae Van Diemen. The species is classified in the Amaranthaceae family and Chenopodiaceae subfamily, along with other halophytic plants (salt-tolerant) species. A. semibaccata has several reported varieties such as var. melanocarpa, var. biformis, var. microcarpa var. gracilis and var. appendiculata. These variations include the morphological differences within this species.

Australia's native range is centred on bracteoles, which are the succulent fruits of A. semibaccata. There are two forms of A. semibaccata in Australia. In Western Australia and southern arid areas are home to rhomboid and succulent bracteoles, whereas slim dry and deltoid shaped bracteoles are found in Queensland and New South Wales. A. semibaccata hybridises with Atriplex spinibractea, where both species subside in New South Wales. This formed the variant, known as A. neurivalvis in northern Queensland, where succulence is not apparent in its bracteoles.

Genetic variability analysis with the use of molecular markers has investigated A. semibaccata and other species of the genus Atriplex. Phylogenetic analysis has confirmed a deviation from all other tested species (A. halimus, A. amnicola, A. lentiformis, A. canescens, A. undulata and A. nummularia). A. semibaccata is distinguished as one of two major groups that are least similar to the other species.

The common names for A. semibaccata include the Australia saltbush. It is also commonly called Australian saltweed, creeping saltbush and berry saltbush. This is one of many Atriplex species native to Australia and is referenced widely in North America. The genus name Atriplex has Latin origins from the ‘atriplexum’, which has been derived from the Greek word ‘astraphaxes’, which translates to "saltbush" or "orach". The species epithet ‘semibaccata’ is derived from the Latin word ‘semi’ which translates to "half", while ‘baccata’ means "bearing berries".

== Distribution and habitat ==
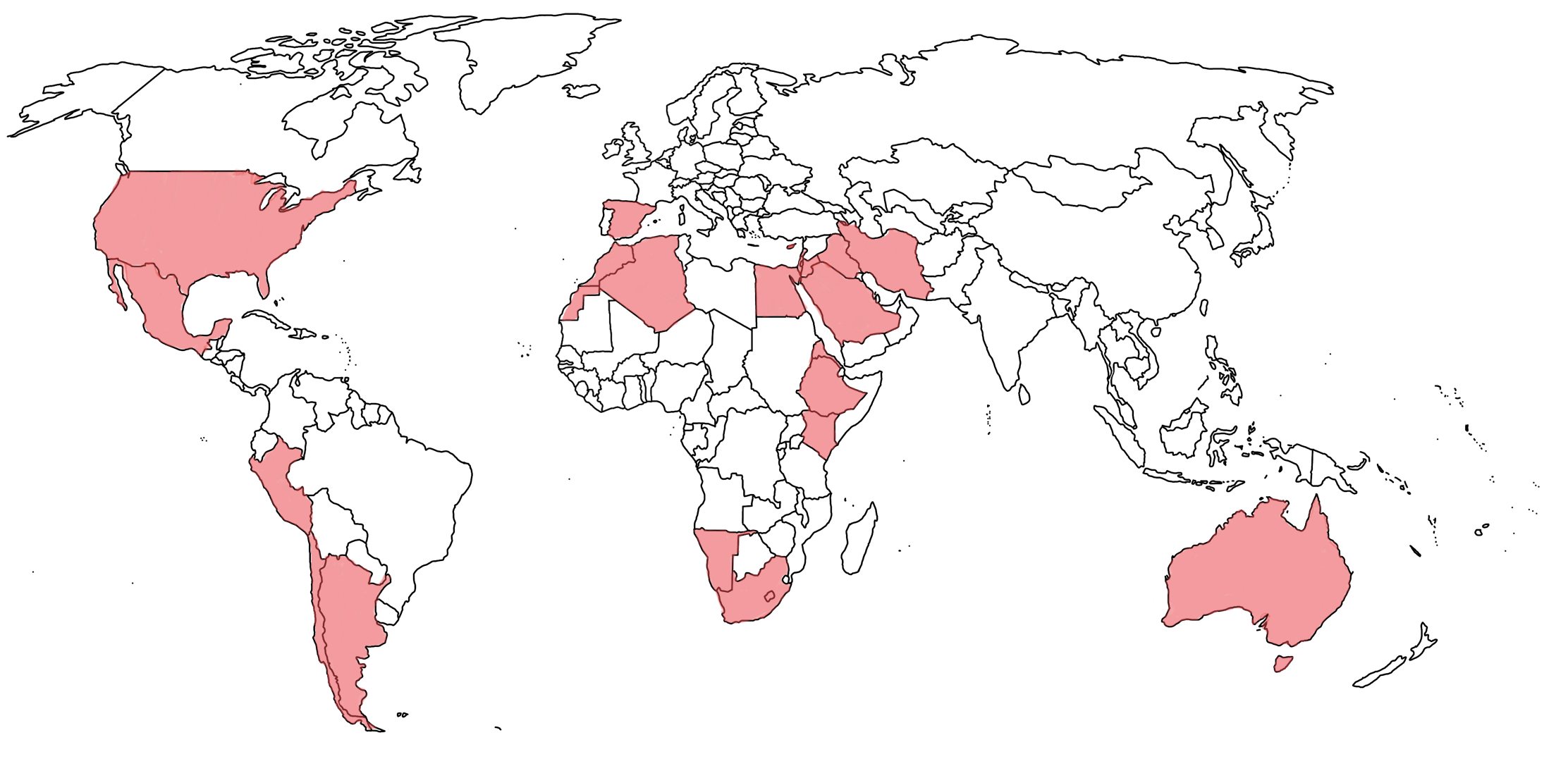
A. semibaccata distribution map of documented regions

This species of saltbush is endemic to Australia and is native to Western Australia, South Australia, Queensland and New South Wales, but has become naturalised in the Australian Capital Territory, on Norfolk Island and possibly Tasmania. It has also been introduced to North and South America, North Africa, the Horn of Africa, the Middle East, Arabian Peninsula, Asia, and the Mediterranean region. A. semibaccata was introduced to different regions worldwide as a drought and salt tolerant fodder crop. Similarly, A. semibaccata was introduced in Tasmania for grazing purposes. Located in heavy soil that is slightly saline, in woodland that is close to salt lakes, and is usually an invader of disturbed areas. First reported distribution was in California in 1901 as a livestock forage in alkaline regions. Seeds were soon after distributed (1916) and by 1940, A. semibaccata inhabited southern coast regions and irregularly inland. Optimal conditions for habitat, include dry/subtropical climate and direct sunlight.

== Ecology ==
=== Reproductive biology ===
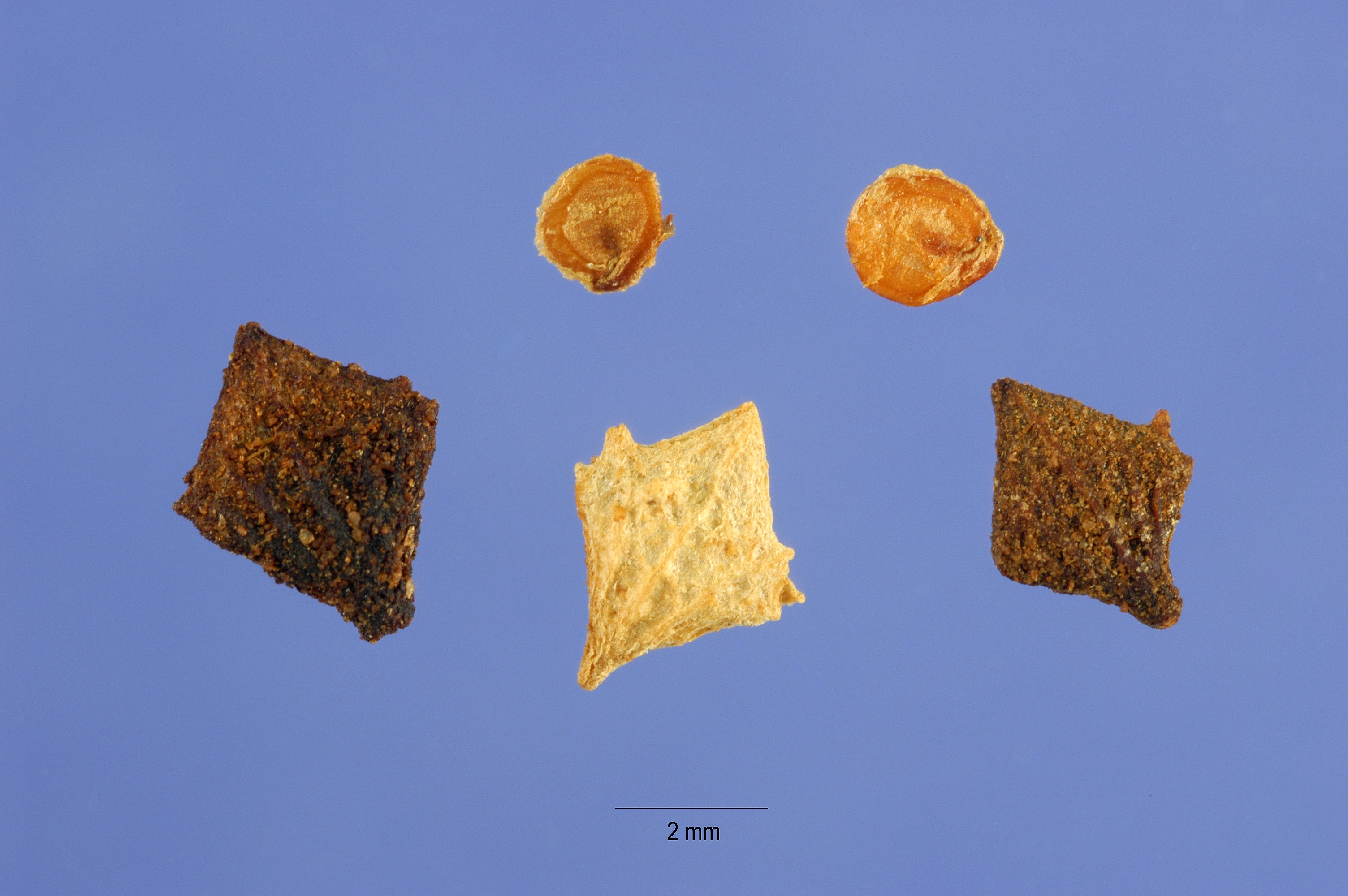
A. semibaccata seed appearance and dimensions for reproduction

A. semibaccata reproduces by seed propagation. This appears when the fruiting bracteoles split when ripe and dry, exposing an individual seed. The seed is with ascending radicle. A. semibaccata is self-compatible and wind pollinated. Male flowers occur as small glomerules in distal axils, while female flowers appear in scattered axillary clusters. Seed persistence in soil and germination conditions are unknown. A. semibaccata does not obtain dormancy when germination rates are high.

In Australia, A. semibaccata flowers and fruits in spring and summer, however flowering is prolonged in Western Australia. A. semibaccata in the northern hemisphere (USA) typically flowers in spring (March–May), summer (June–August) and early winter (December–February).

=== Physiology and phenology ===
The development of C_{4} photosynthesis has played a role in the evolutionary success of the Atriplex genus. Various C_{4} Chenopodiaceae plants differ from the Kranz anatomy of Atriplex, which includes a layer of bundle sheath cells surrounding the vascular bundle, as well as radially arranged palisade cells, with little variation in C_{4} leaf types. Depending on the immediate environmental conditions, A. semibaccata demonstrates the ability to adapt. This relates to environmental conditions such as air temperature, soil moisture, salinity and evaporation.

Greater exposure to a saline environment, induces a salt stress response which displays a decrease number of chloroplasts in chlorenchyma and bundle sheath cells, as well as a decreased root diameter, leaf size, leaf stromal conductance and the net leaf photosynthetic rate. Higher saline exposure increases intracellular CO_{2} concentration and the number of stomata per unit leaf area.

During winter, A. semibaccata becomes dormant, whereas other Atriplex species maintain function. Low and inconsistent rainfall, varying temperatures, humidity and poor soil are contributing factors that involve A. semibaccata to adapt.

== Cultivation ==
=== Environmental requirements ===
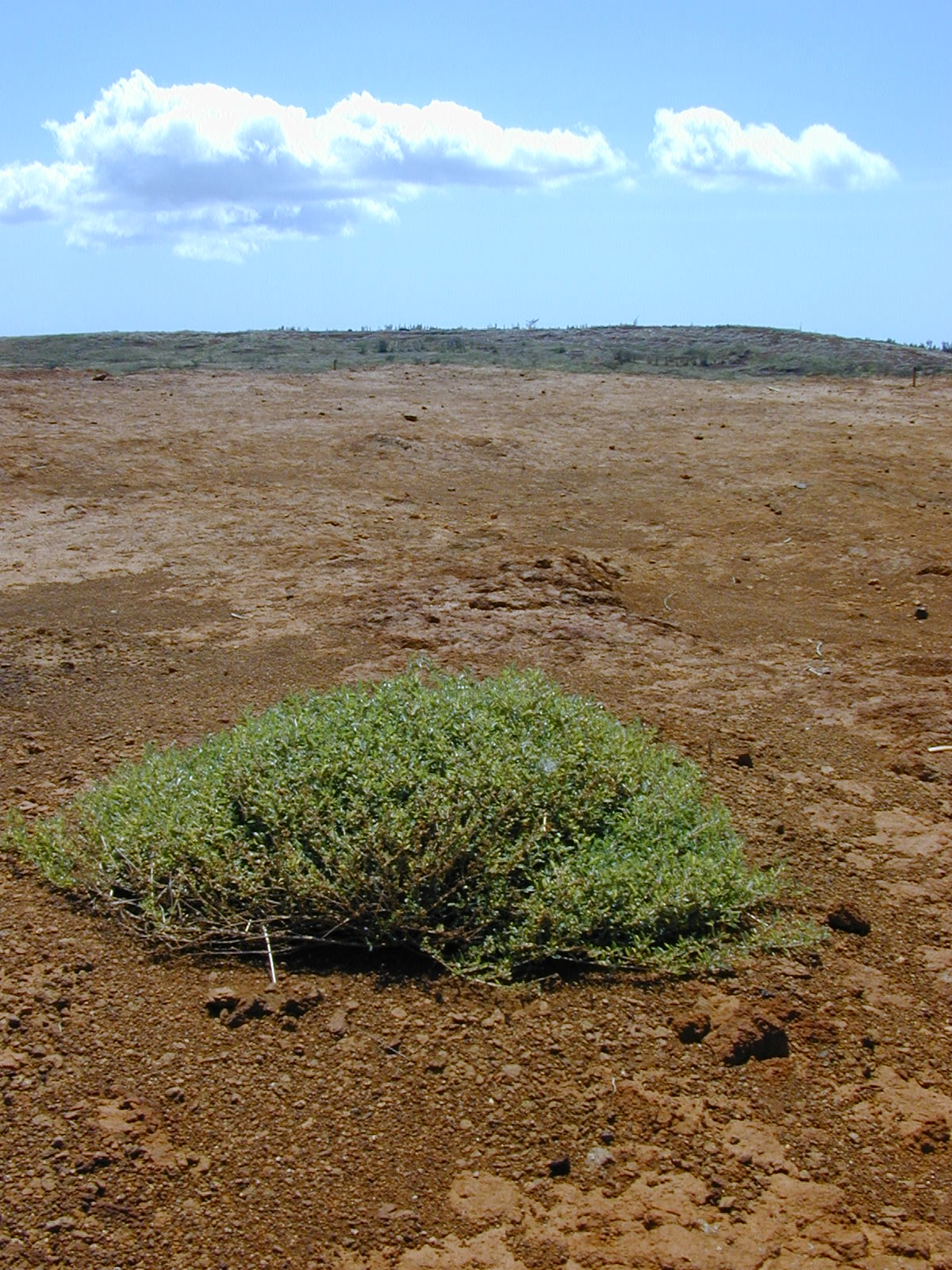
Growth of A. semibaccata in arid and saline conditions

A. semibaccata is native to Australia, however it is not located in tropical and humid regions such as Northern Queensland. It is a drought tolerant species of subtropical arid and semi-arid regions. A region with a mean annual rainfall of 250-900mm is optimal for A. semibaccata. It is a low spreading and deep-rooted sub-shrub that does not require much soil moisture. Sun exposed regions are an optimal condition for growth. A. semibaccata is winter tolerant and can survive a minimum air temperature of −5 °C. A. semibaccata is salt-laden wind tolerant and has been indicated as an environmental advantage against plants that are distributed along coastal regions. Additionally, saline soil allows for rapid and more profuse seed germination. This is a competitive advantage, against native species worldwide. A. semibaccata has a high degree of salt tolerance (9-16 dS/m) and grows in soil that is exposed to light and is acidic. A. semibaccata grows in various soil types, including clay loams, sandy loams and waterlogged environments.

=== Movement and dispersal ===
Natural dispersion of A. semibaccata are over short distances as seeds are found under remnant and understorey plants. Animal dispersion expands the distance covered of A. semibaccata. The red fruiting bracteoles of A. semibaccata are succulent and are attractive to herbivore species. Species that eat the fruiting bracteoles are responsible for animal dispersion and spread the seed of A. semibaccata. A. semibaccata seeds have been found in the digestive tract of reptiles, birds and foxes in California, USA. Accidental introduction of A. semibaccata is a result of relocating hay and other fodder crops. A. semibaccata was introduced internationally to various countries, to acquire the drought and saline resistant properties that allow for use as a fodder and ground cover. A. semibaccata is intentionally dispersed for its uses.

== Uses ==
=== Cover crop ===
In its native range of Australia, A. semibaccata is used in agroforestry to improve the performance and profitability of vineyards. A. semibaccata has been introduced to regions with reduced water availability due to drought and increased temperatures, as a sustainable cover crop that deters potential pest species. Native perennial cover crops such as A. semibaccata can increase the abundance of symbiotic invertebrates that can improve pest control and limit the need of synthetic pest controls.

=== Rehabilitation ===
A. semibaccata has been used for regenerative purposes, where it has been planted to restore mine spoils. A. semibaccata is adaptive to the saline and drought conditions of mining waste and exhibits germination among these regions. A. semibaccata has also been used for landscaping purposes and as ground cover to control soil and erosion. A. semibaccata is an effective weed control in verges, roundabouts and nature strips. Additional uses of A. semibaccata includes land reclamation without the need for saline water irrigation systems and restoring bare patches of ground.

=== Animal feed ===
A. semibaccata is used as saltland pasture and produces fodder for grazing animals when sources of paddock feed are limited. This can improve production from saltland sites, reduce salt movement and stabilise soil structure. A. semibaccata is a readily grazed Atriplex saltbush, which provides a more diverse diet and primary fodder/ animal feed. The high salt content in foliage reduces the use of A. semibaccata as a food source if availability of drinking water for livestock is not adequate. A. semibaccata is palatable when young, contains a low energy value and is a source of crude protein. Additional food supplements and adequate drinking water are necessary for livestock.

=== Medicinal ===
A. semibaccata essential oils contain compounds with antibacterial and antioxidant properties. The essential oils of A. semibaccata are moderately synergistic with gentamicin, which is an antibiotic that is used to treat several bacterial infections. A. semibaccata is suitable for revegetation of marginal lands, with the use of its biomass as an essential oil for the control of microbial infections. Additionally, alcohol extracts from A. semibaccata, such as scopoletin, coumarin, scopolin, umbelliferorne, 7-methoxy coumarin, phenolic acid and P-coumaric acid has antibacterial activity. Isolated compounds from A. semibaccata, such as compounds tyramine and lignanamide exhibit cytotoxic activity against the proliferation of leukemia lymphoblasts (CCRF-CEM) cells.

== Environmental impact ==
A. semibaccata is grown and dispersed over short distances. This creates a dense fire-retardant ground cover that displaces native plant species. A. semibaccata is identified as an invasive species by the US Fish and Wildlife service and is known to affect endangered species such as Panicum niihauense (critically endangered), Verbesina dissita and Sesbania tomentosa. Scaevola coriacea and Sesbania tomentosa are native and endangered grass species of Hawaii, USA. Scaevola coriacea is found in three naturally occurring populations and Sesbania tomentosa is located on the island of Molokai. In California, USA, A. semibaccata competes with native plants such as Verbesina dissita for space, shade, water and light. A. semibaccata creates an ecological shift that is caused by competition for resources, shading, ecosystem change and habitat alteration.

A. semibaccata enhances biodiversity through biological control. Agroecosystems that involve A. semibaccata increase the abundance of invertebrates that assist in pest control as well as an increased range of predators and parasitoids. A. semibaccata acts as a cover crop that provides shelter for various invertebrates, this increases biodiversity and bioactivity. This provides the environment for natural breakdown of organic material, aeration and nutrient cycling that keeps A. semibaccata and surrounding vegetation healthy. Additionally, this abundant soil diversity supports pest predators that prevent harmful organisms from over populating. This prevents the destruction of crops. A. semibaccata improves the quality and structure of soil, suppresses weeds and contributes to pest management.

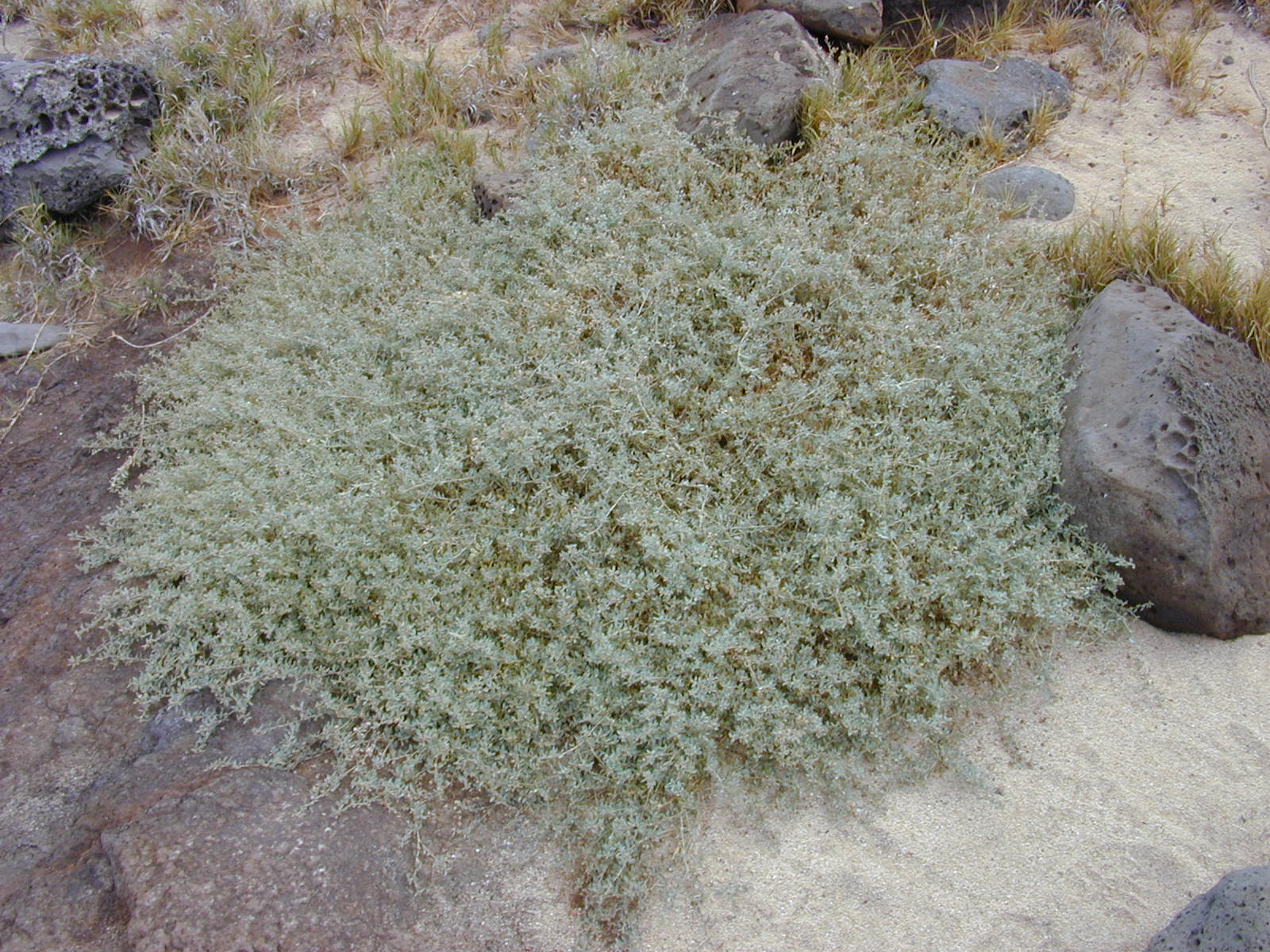
Invasive growth in Kahoolawe, Hawaii

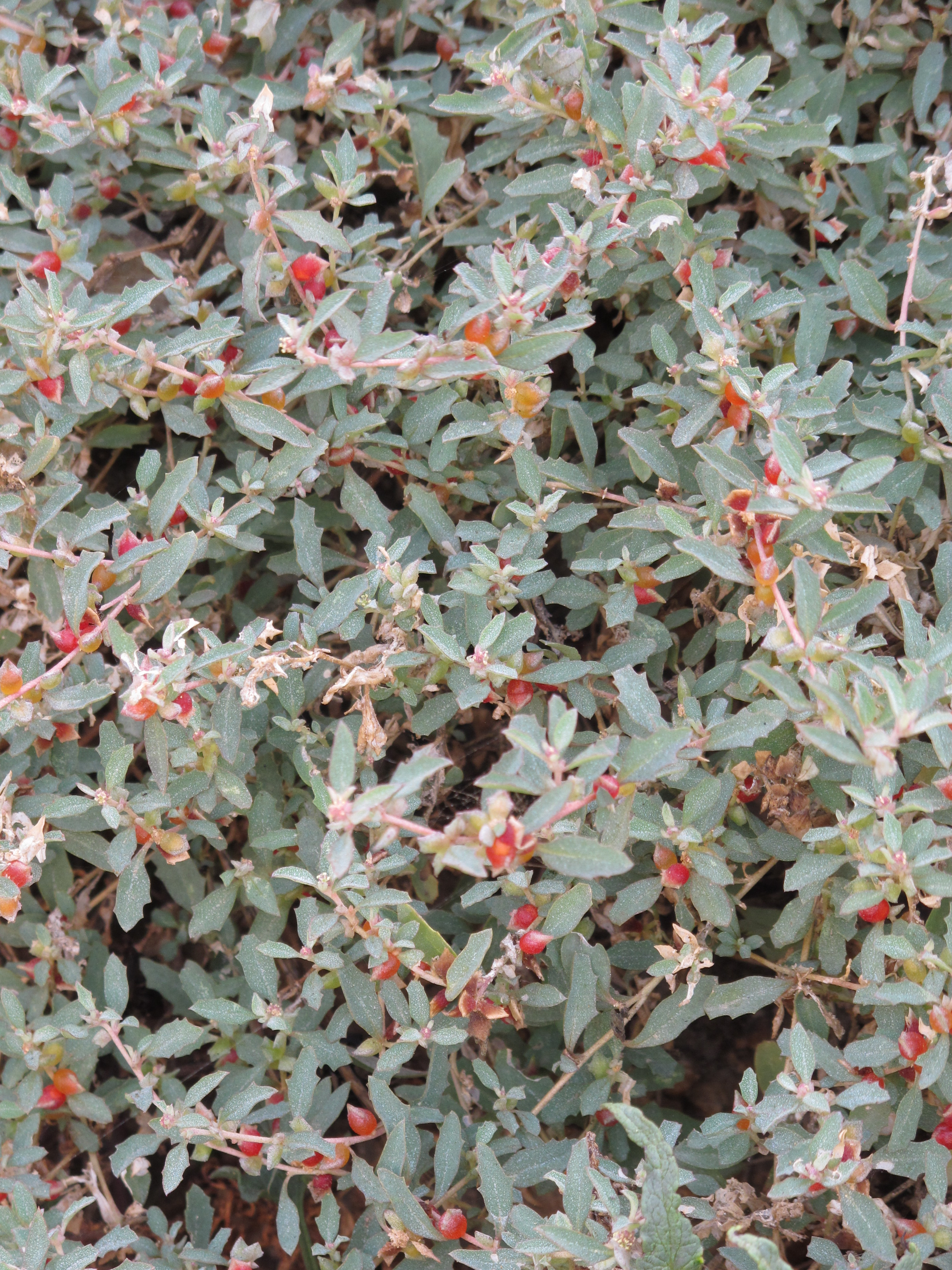
Invasive growth in the Canary Islands, Spain

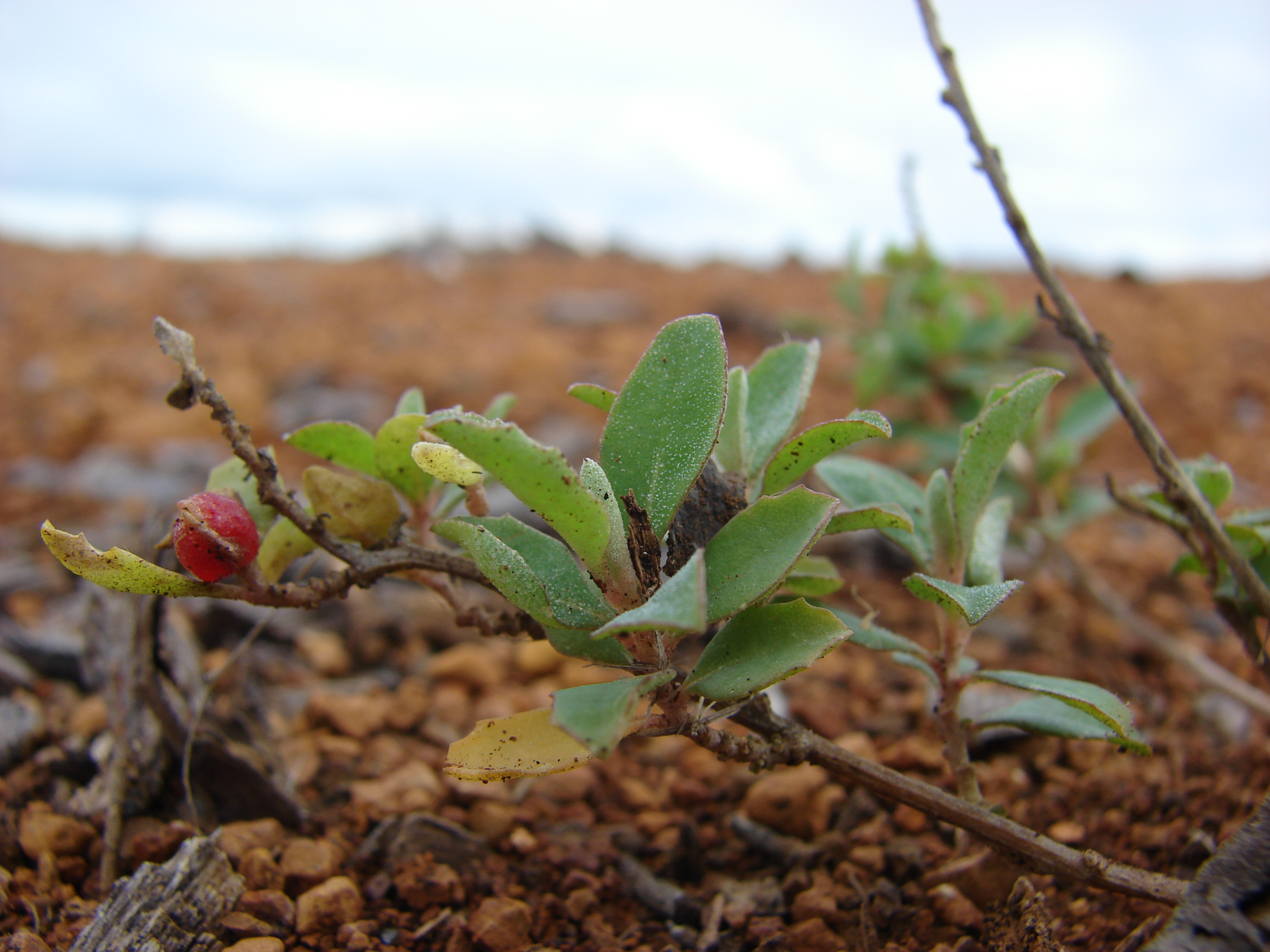
Invasive growth of in Kahoolawe, Hawaii

== Economic impact ==
The economic impact of A. semibaccata is positive in regions where it is not invasive. Benefits that have a positive economic effect include its value in rehabilitation, medicinal properties as well as food and cover cropper. The negative economic impact is generated by its invasiveness that endangers native species, causes a change in ecological and alters the surrounding biodiversity. This requires physical and chemical control processes that can be laborious and require economic expenditure. Control chemicals for A. semibaccata involve herbicides, such as dicamba, dicamba/MCPA amine, 2,4-D and picloram/2,4-D. To physically remove A. semibaccata, hand pulling is an effective method due to its small size. To physically control A. semibaccata, it must be uprooted prior to seed production. Site revision is required to remove plants arising from residual seed pools.
