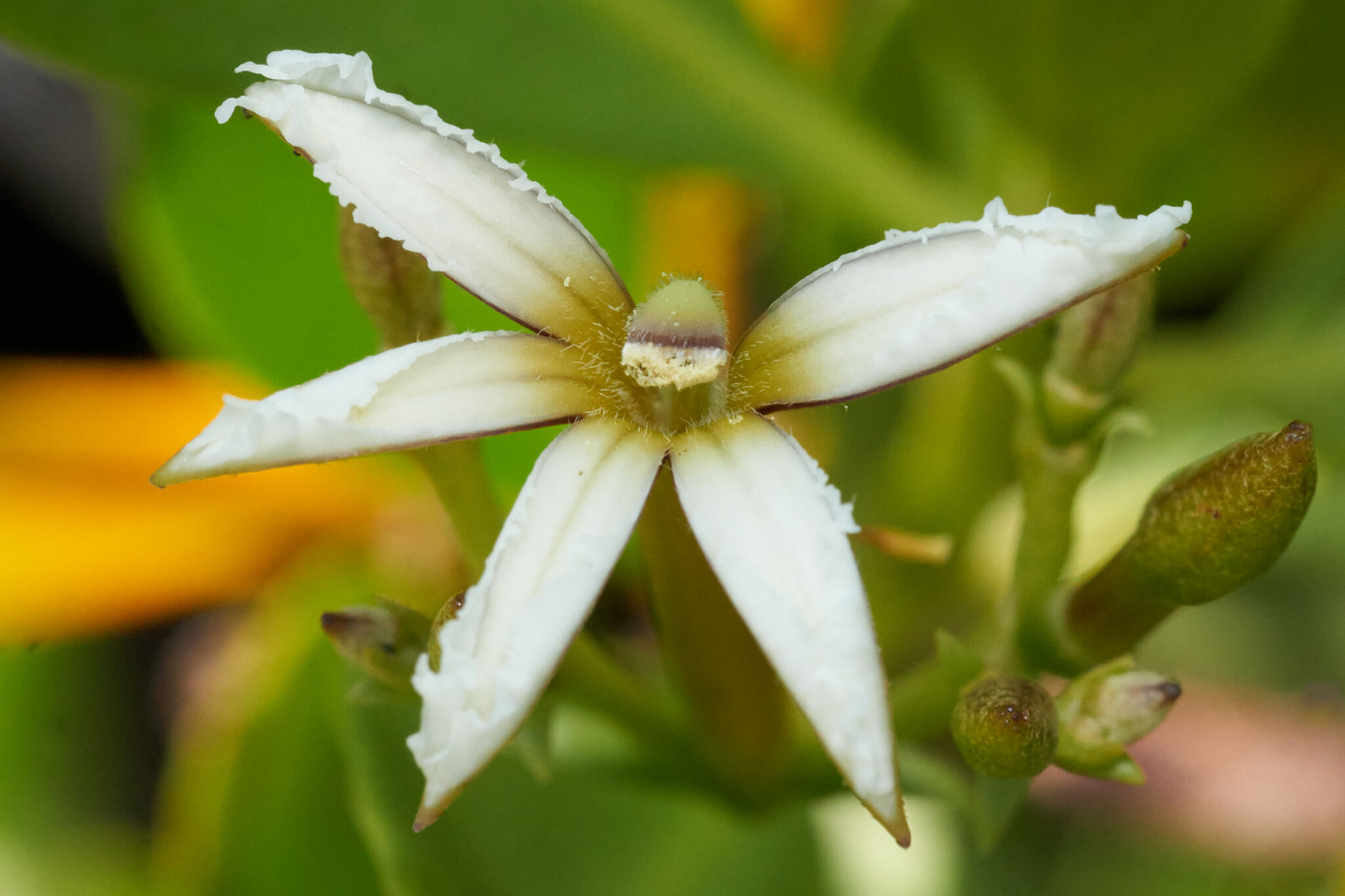
- In native forest near Pu'u O'o in Hawai'i Volcanoes National Park

Conservation status
- Critically Imperiled (NatureServe)

Scientific classification
- Kingdom: Plantae
- Clade: Tracheophytes
- Clade: Angiosperms
- Clade: Eudicots
- Clade: Asterids
- Order: Asterales
- Family: Goodeniaceae
- Genus: Scaevola
- Species: S. kilaueae

Binomial name
- Scaevola kilaueae O.Deg.

= Scaevola kilaueae =

Species of flowering plant

Scaevola kilaueae, the Kīlauea naupaka, is a species of fanflower endemic to the eastern windward side of the island of Hawaiʻi.

== Description ==
Scaevola kilaueae is a small shrub 0.5-1m high. The leaves are glabrous (lacking hairs) and 3-7cm long and 1-1.5cm wide. The flowers are white and (like other fanflowers) asymmetric, giving the appearance of missing petals.

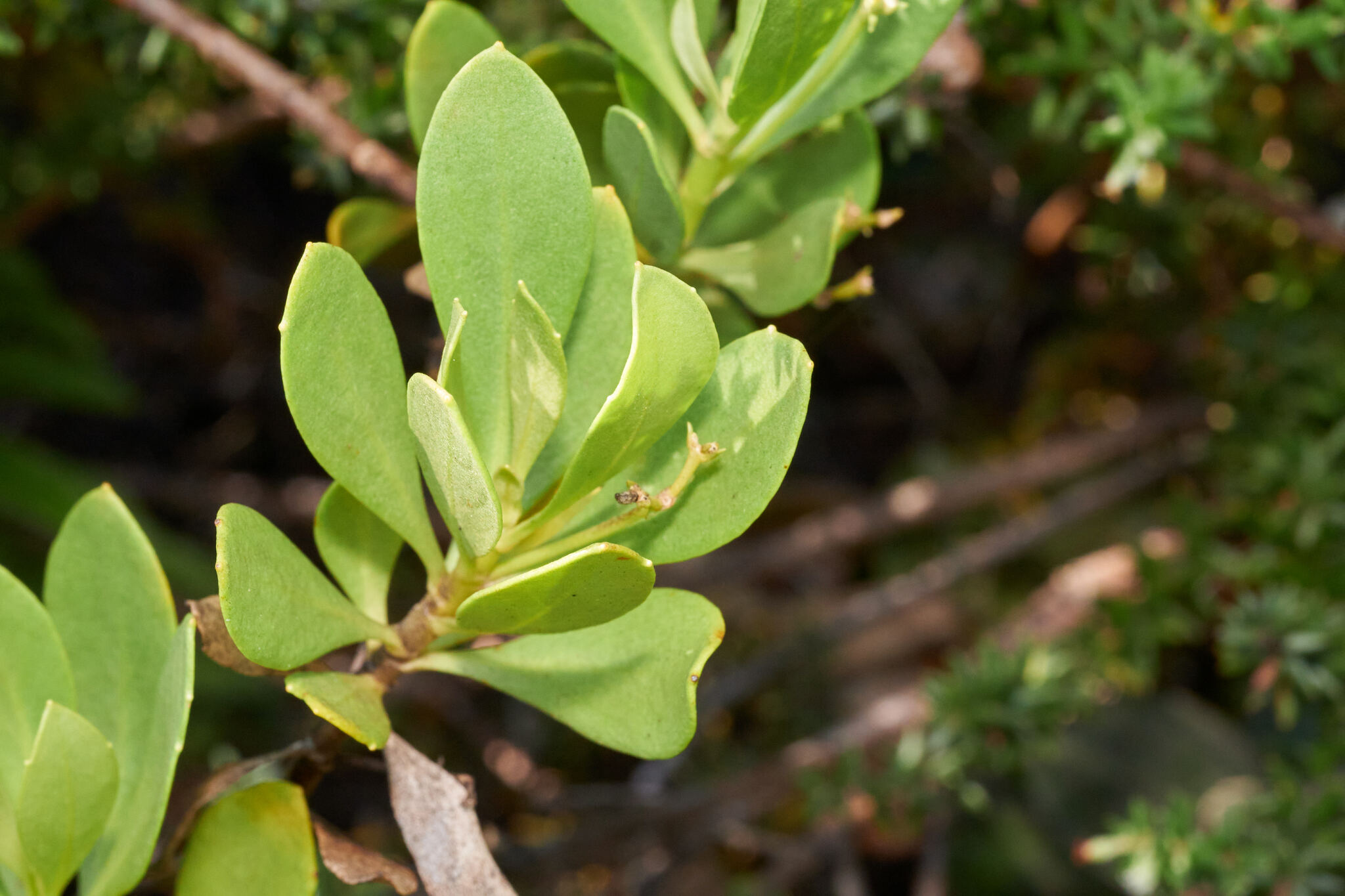

== Evolution ==
Scaevola kilaueae has been proposed as a hybrid between other Hawaiian endemic fanflowers, Scaevola coriacea and Scaevola chamissoniana.
