= Hylaeus longiceps =

Conservation status
- Endangered (ESA)

Scientific classification
- Kingdom: Animalia
- Phylum: Arthropoda
- Clade: Pancrustacea
- Class: Insecta
- Order: Hymenoptera
- Family: Colletidae
- Genus: Hylaeus
- Species: H. longiceps

Binomial name
- Hylaeus longiceps Perkins, 1899

Species of bee

Hylaeus longiceps, also known as the longhead yellow-faced bee, is a species of bee endemic to Hawaii and known from only six populations. In September 2016, along with six other Hawaiian yellow-faced bee species, H. longiceps was listed for protection under the United States Endangered Species Act. This marked a first listing for any bees species in the US.

== Description ==
This bee is black in color with "smoky-colored wings". It has an elongated head. The male has a yellow band on his face, while the female is totally black.

This is a solitary bee. The female lays eggs in a nest which may be located in the ground or under bark; the bee uses available cavities and does not excavate the nest herself. She lines the cavity with a film she secretes, and then places a mass of nectar and pollen for the newly hatched larvae to eat. The adult bee consumes nectar. This and many other Hylaeus species lack the scopa which some bees use to carry pollen, and instead carry it in their crops. The bee visits several native Hawaiian plants, such as Scaevola coriacea, Sida fallax, Sesbania tomentosa, Myoporum sandwicense, Santalum ellipticum, and Vitex rotundifolia.

== Distribution and habitat ==
This bee occurs in coastal and lowland dry shrubland. There are 3 populations on Lanai and one each on Maui, Molokai, and Oahu. The population sizes are not known. Much of its known habitat has been developed or degraded, and its host plants no longer grow in the area.

The main threat to the species is habitat loss. Damage to the habitat has occurred via development, the introduction of nonnative plants and animals, agriculture, recreational activity, and fire. Natural disasters such as hurricanes are also a threat to the habitat. This and other rare Hylaeus bee species were once "widespread" in Hawaii.
