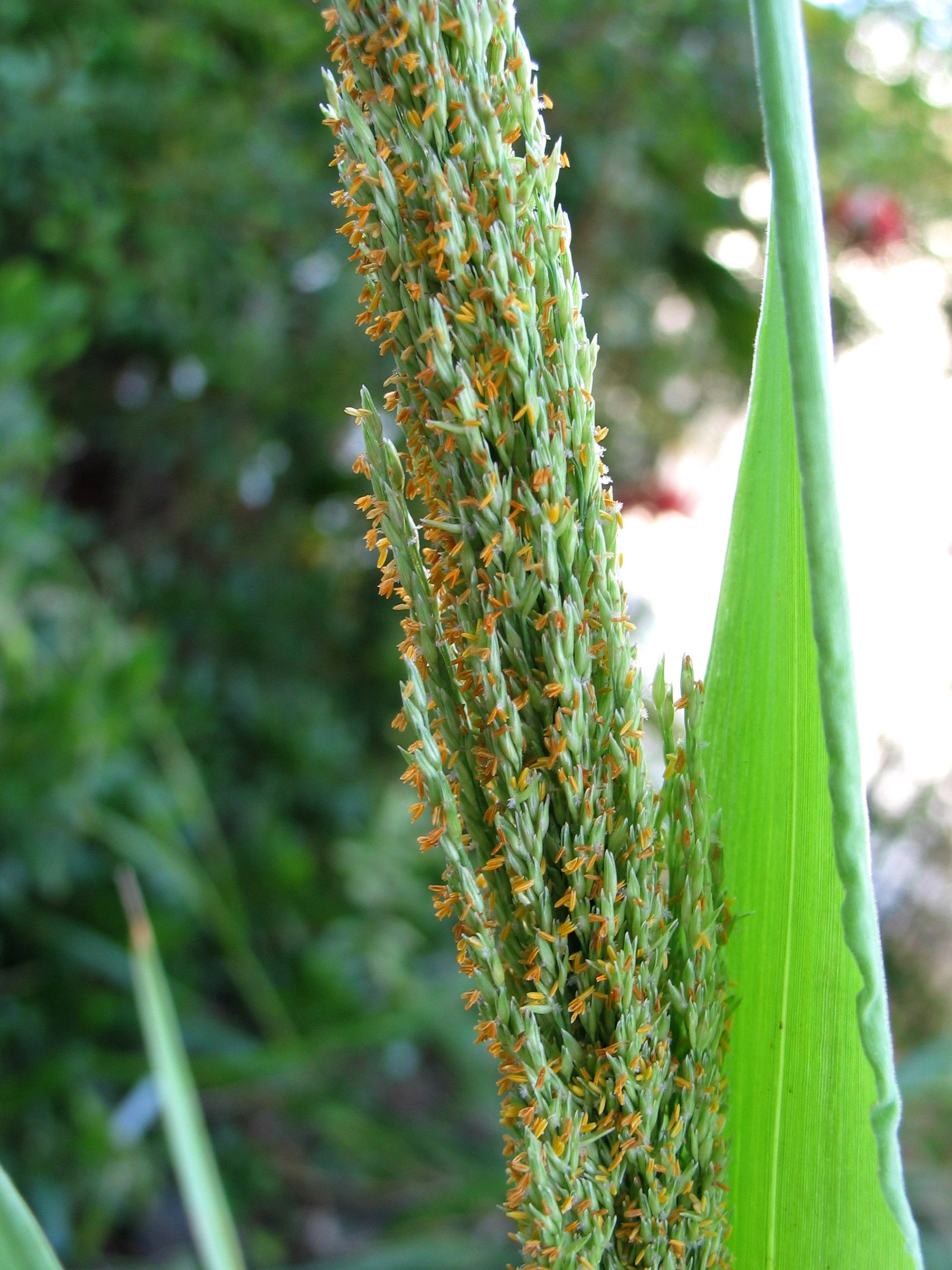

Conservation status
- Critically Imperiled (NatureServe)

Scientific classification
- Kingdom: Plantae
- Clade: Tracheophytes
- Clade: Angiosperms
- Clade: Monocots
- Clade: Commelinids
- Order: Poales
- Family: Poaceae
- Subfamily: Panicoideae
- Genus: Panicum
- Species: P. niihauense

Binomial name
- Panicum niihauense H.St.John

= Panicum niihauense =

Species of grass

Panicum niihauense is a rare species of grass known by the common names lau ʻehu and Niʻihau panicgrass. It is endemic to Hawaii, where it has been found on the islands of Niʻihau and Kauaʻi. It has not been observed on Niʻihau since 1949, and there are fewer than 40 individuals remaining on Kauaʻi, not counting a few individuals that have been deliberately planted in appropriate habitat. The grass is a federally listed endangered species of the United States.

The only naturally occurring specimens of the grass grow in Polihale State Park. There they grow on sand dunes and they are threatened by the use of off-road vehicles. The habitat is also impacted by the invasion of non-native plants such as Chloris barbata (swollen fingergrass), Leucaena leucocephala (haole koa), Prosopis pallida (kiawe), Atriplex semibaccata (Australian saltbush), and Verbesina encelioides (golden crown-beard).

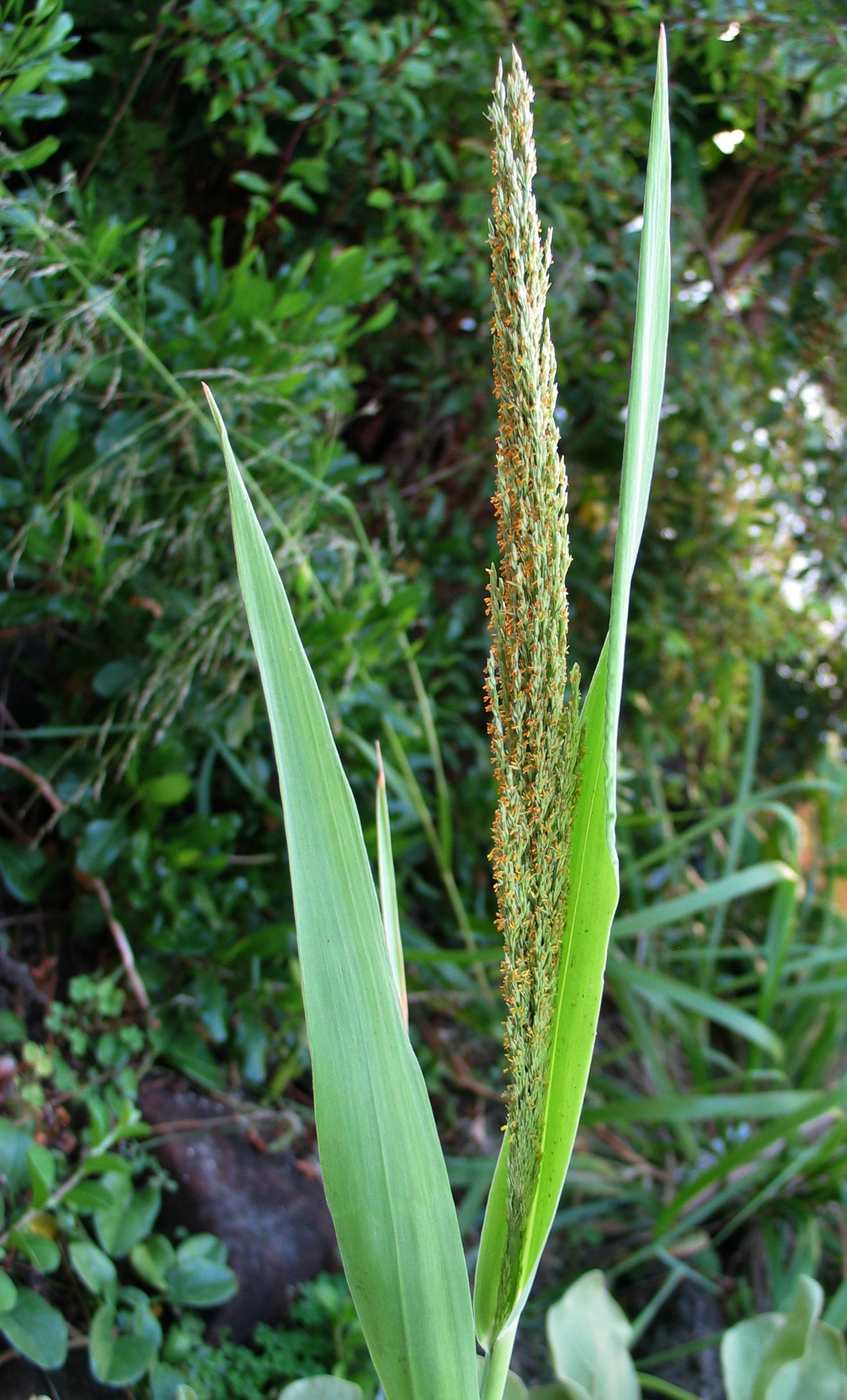
The lau ʻehu It is a very rare species.
