= Palisade cell =

Type of cell found in plant leaves

Diagram of the internal structure of a leaf

Palisade cells, also called palisade mesophyll cells, are plant cells located inside the mesophyll of most green leaves. They are vertically elongated and are stacked side by side, in contrast to the irregular and loosely arranged spongy mesophyll cells beneath them. Palisade cells are responsible for carrying out the majority of the photosynthesis in a leaf.

Palisade cells occur in dicotyledonous plants, and also in the net-veined monocots: the Araceae and Dioscoreaceae.

== Structure ==
Palisade cells are located beneath the upper epidermis and cuticle but above the spongy mesophyll cells.

Palisade cells contain a high concentration of chloroplasts, particularly in the upper portion of the cell, making them the primary site of photosynthesis in the leaves of plants that contain them. Their vacuole also aids in this function: it is large and central, pushing the chloroplasts to the edge of the cell, maximising the absorption of light.
