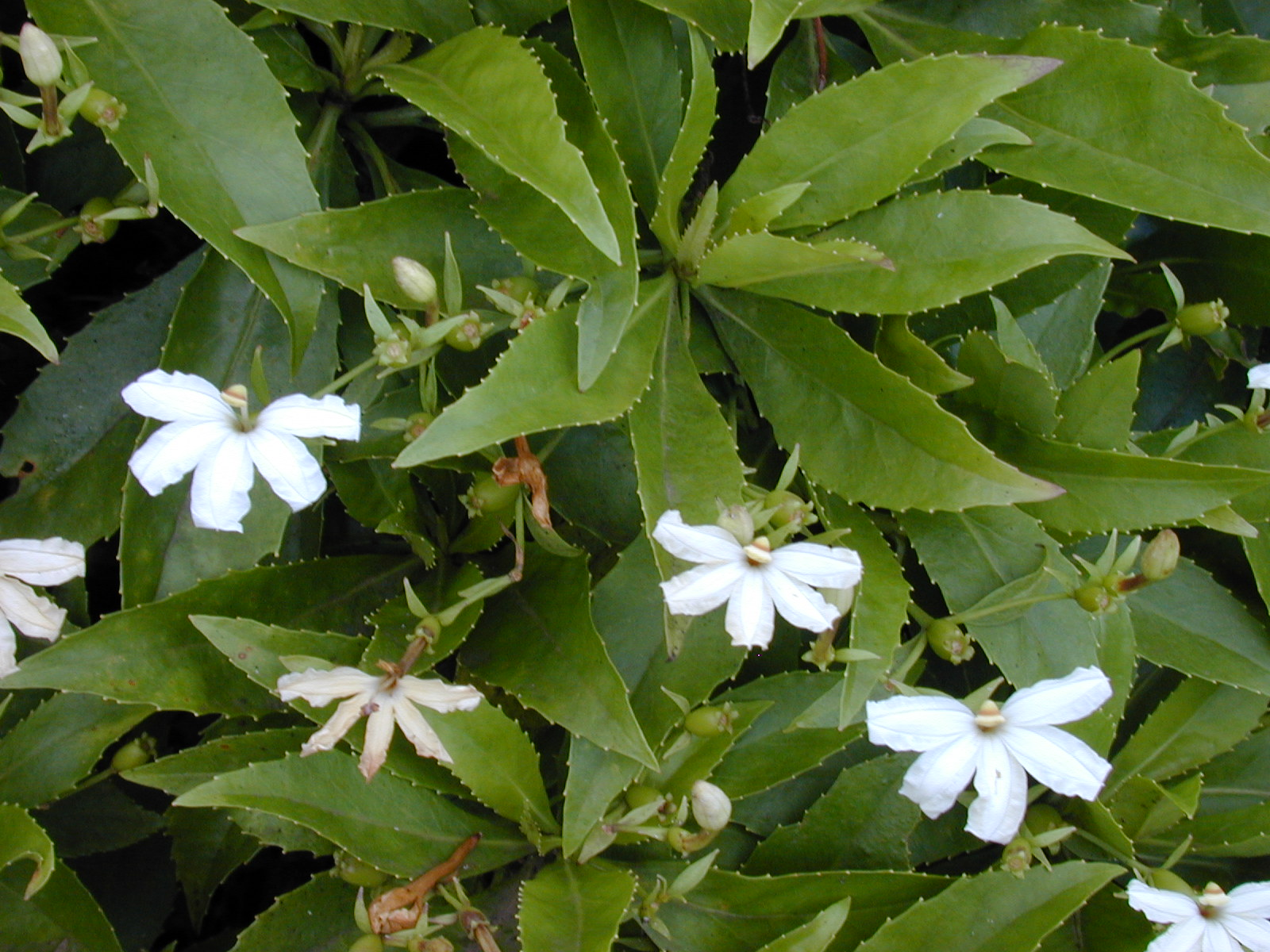

Conservation status
- Near Threatened (IUCN 3.1)

- Vulnerable (NatureServe)

Scientific classification
- Kingdom: Plantae
- Clade: Tracheophytes
- Clade: Angiosperms
- Clade: Eudicots
- Clade: Asterids
- Order: Asterales
- Family: Goodeniaceae
- Genus: Scaevola
- Species: S. chamissoniana

Binomial name
- Scaevola chamissoniana Gaudich.

Synonyms
- Lobelia chamissoniana Kuntze; Lobelia cylindrocarpa Kuntze; Scaevola cylindrocarpa Hillebr. Temminckia chamissoniana de Vriese

= Scaevola chamissoniana =

Species of shrub

Scaevola chamissoniana is a shrub in the family Goodeniaceae with a native range of the Hawaiian Islands, where it is known as the Mountain naupaka or Naupaka kuahiwi.

It is found in wet forests and open areas at elevations of about 1,150 feet (350 m). It flowers yearround.

It was first described in 1829, by Charles Gaudichaud-Beaupré. The specific epithet, chamissoniana, honours Adelbert de Chamisso, naturalist to the expedition ("around the world, by order of the king").

== Classification, distribution, and habitat ==
Naupaka flowers have 5 petals, spiral leaves, and have a single plane of bilateral symmetry. They belong to the subclass Asteridae and family Goodenia. They share many characteristics with many types of fanflower plants. There are eight species of Naupaka plants which are native to Hawaii.

The two forms of the Naupaka never grow in the same place. The beach naupaka strictly grow in beach environments and are well adapted to grow with the heat from the sun and the salt spray from the ocean. The beach variations of Naupaka are pure white in color. The mountain naupaka needs to be high in elevation at a cooler and rainy area of the mountains. The mountain type of naupaka are all different shades of purple and violet. The beach and mountain Naupaka flower are exactly the same but also polar opposite in their habitat needs which is what makes it such a special plant.

== Distribution and habitat ==
This species is endemic to the islands of Hawaii. They can mostly be found in Kauai or Oahu at all elevations. They are abundant year round in tropical forests and open areas and grow densely and as large shrubs in undergrowth. It is well adapted to the moist air and wet environment of the Hawaiian islands.

== Reproduction ==
The Naupaka flowers bloom year round and sporadically. Naupaka flowers are primarily pollinated by native Hawaiian bees who are attracted to the flower’s distinct pistil due to the half shape of the flower structure. Beach naupaka relies on seeds dispersed by ocean currents and birds, allowing it to colonize coastal areas. Mountain naupaka depends on land-based animals and gravity to distribute its seeds within the mountain ecosystems. Both the beach and mountain naupaka have adapted their reproduction styles to their environment to ensure their long term survival.

== Growth, form, and sizes ==
The Naupaka plants are shrubs which can also grow into trees. They are a 5 petal flowering plant. Small shrubs range from 2 to 6 feet (0.61 to 1.83 m). Medium sized shrubs grow from around 6 to 10 feet (1.8 to 3.0 m). Small Naupaka trees grow to around 10 to 30 feet (0 to 0 m). The flowers are most commonly white. Other species of fan flowers are purple, blue, or pink. The leaves are a medium green color. The leaves of the Naupaka are thick and plump, similar to a succulent. They are known as fanflowers because the petals don’t go around in the circle around the pistil which is the center part of a flower. Instead, the petals go only around half of the circumference creating a fan-like shape.

== Cultural significance ==
There are two variations of the legend behind the Naupaka flower to explain why they have an incomplete appearance and why there is the beach naupaka vs the mountain naupaka that are the same flower but require different habitats and have different colors.

The flower is named after a Hawaiian princess named Naupaka. She was in love with a commoner named Kaui. The two were not allowed to be together because of their class rankings. They ran away to find a kahuna (a Hawaiian priest, expert, secret keeper, or healer) to help them be together but he was unable to do anything for them. Naupaka was wearing a flower in her ear and out of sadness took it out, ripped it in half, and gave the other half to Kaui. She claimed that since the Gods wouldn’t allow the two to be together, she would live in the mountains and he would live down at the beach by the water. The next day, the naupaka plants started to grow everywhere between where the two were, between the shoreline and the top of the mountain. These plants would bloom in only half flowers which explains their fan-like shape.

Another version of the legend says that in ancient times Pele, the Hawaiian Goddess of volcanoes and fire was jealous of these two young lovers and wanted to split them up. She eventually drove the man away into the mountains while the woman was stuck down on the beach. Pele had planned to burn the man to death with her lava but Pele’s two sisters had pity for the man and they changed him into Mountain Naupaka flower. The Naupaka is one of a few plants who are able to survive on lava fields. Then, when Pele went to go after the girl, Pele’s sisters transformed the girl into the Beach Naupaka. This type of Naupaka is able to survive in the sand and is adapted to the salty ocean water.

The Napuku flowers nowadays are used in leis. Traditionally, a man would bring his woman a lei made from these half flowers put together to be whole again. This is a symbol for the love and reunion of Naupaka and Kaui from the legend(s).
