= List of polymorphisms =

In biology, polymorphism is the occurrence of two or more clearly different forms or phenotypes in a population of a species. Different types of polymorphism have been identified and are listed separately.

== General ==
=== Chromosomal polymorphism ===
In 1973, M. J. D. White, then at the end of a long career investigating karyotypes, gave an interesting summary of the distribution of chromosome polymorphism.

"It is extremely difficult to get an adequate idea as to what fraction of the species of eukaryote organisms actually are polymorphic for structural rearrangements of the chromosomes. In Dipterous flies with polytene chromosomes... the figure is somewhere between 60 and 80 percent... In grasshoppers pericentric inversion polymorphism is shown by only a small number of species. But in this group polymorphism for super-numerary chromosomes and chromosome regions is very strongly developed in many species."

"It is clear that the nature of natural populations is a very complicated subject, and it now appears probable that adaptation of the various genotypes to different ecological niches and frequency-dependent selection are at least as important, and probably more important in many cases, than simple heterosis (in the sense of increased viability or fecundity of the heterozygote)".

This suggests, once again, that polymorphism is a common and important aspect of adaptive evolution in natural populations.

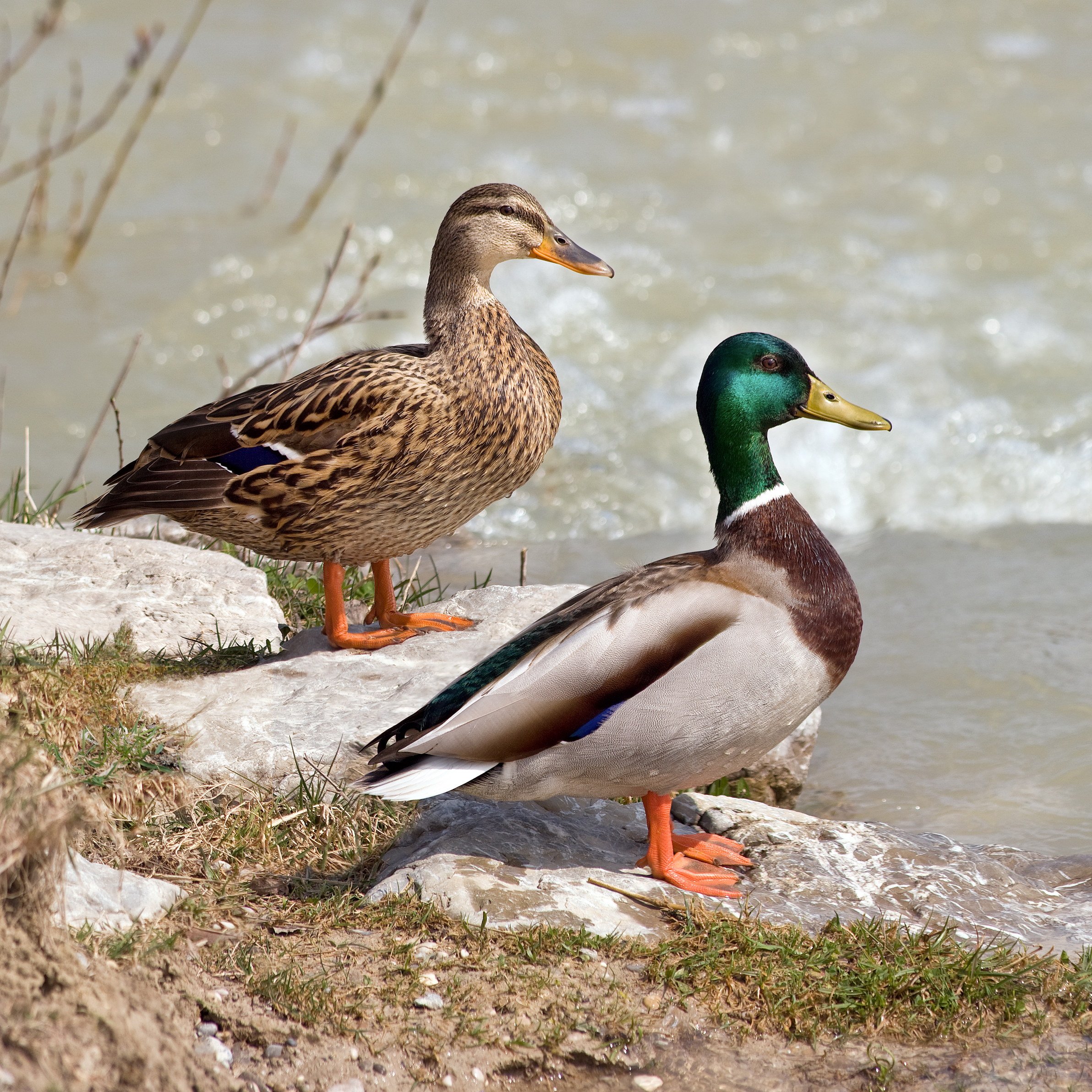
A female (left) and a male (right) mallard (A. platyrhynchos). Like many other species of birds, mallards display striking sexual dimorphism.

== Humans ==
=== Human blood groups ===
All the common blood types, such as the ABO blood group system, are genetic polymorphisms. Here we see a system where there are more than two morphs: the phenotypes A, B, AB and O are present in all human populations, but vary in proportion in different parts of the world. The phenotypes are controlled by multiple alleles at one locus. These polymorphisms are seemingly never eliminated by natural selection; the reason came from a study of disease statistics.

Statistical research has shown that an individual of a given phenotype will generally be, compared to an individual of a differing phenotype, more resistant to certain diseases while less resistant to others. For example, an individual's susceptibility to cholera (and other diarrheal infections) is correlated with their blood type: those with type O blood are the most susceptible, while those with type AB are the most resistant. Between these two extremes are the A and B blood types, with type A being more resistant than type B. This suggests that the pleiotropic effects of the genes set up opposing selective forces, thus maintaining a balance. Geographical distribution of blood groups (the differences in gene frequency between populations) is broadly consistent with the classification of "races" developed by early anthropologists on the basis of visible features.

=== Sickle-cell anaemia ===
Sickle-cell anaemia is found mostly in tropical populations in Africa and India. An individual homozygous for the recessive sickle hemoglobin, HgbS, has a short expectancy of life, whereas the life expectancy of the standard hemoglobin (HgbA) homozygote as well as heterozygote is normal (though heterozygote individuals will suffer periodic problems). The sickle-cell variant survives in the population because the heterozygote is resistant to malaria and the malarial parasite kills a huge number of people each year. This is balancing selection or genetic polymorphism, balanced between fierce selection against homozygous sickle-cell sufferers, and selection against the standard HgbA homozygotes by malaria. The heterozygote has a permanent advantage (a higher fitness) so long as malaria exists; and it has existed as a human parasite for a long time. Because the heterozygote survives, so does the HgbS allele survive at a rate much higher than the mutation rate.

=== Duffy system ===
The Duffy antigen is a protein located on the surface of red blood cells, encoded by the FY (DARC) gene. The protein encoded by this gene is a non-specific receptor for several chemokines, and is the known entry-point for the human malarial parasites Plasmodium vivax and Plasmodium knowlesi. Polymorphisms in this gene are the basis of the Duffy blood group system.

In humans, a mutant variant at a single site in the FY cis-regulatory region abolishes all expression of the gene in erythrocyte precursors. As a result, homozygous mutants are strongly protected from infection by P. vivax, and a lower level of protection is conferred on heterozygotes. The variant has apparently arisen twice in geographically distinct human populations, in Africa and Papua New Guinea. It has been driven to high frequencies on at least two haplotypic backgrounds within Africa. Recent work indicates a similar, but not identical, pattern exists in baboons (Papio cynocephalus), which suffer a mosquito-carried malaria-like pathogen, Hepatocystis kochi. Researchers interpret this as a case of convergent evolution.

=== G6PD ===
Glucose-6-phosphate dehydrogenase human polymorphism is also implicated in malarial resistance. G6PD alleles with reduced activity are maintained at a high level in endemic malarial regions, despite reduced general viability. Variant A (with 85% activity) reaches 40% in sub-Saharan Africa, but is generally less than 1% outside Africa and the Middle East.

=== Human taste morphisms ===
A famous puzzle in human genetics is the genetic ability to taste phenylthiocarbamide (phenylthiourea or PTC), a morphism which was discovered in 1931. This substance, which is bitter to some people and tasteless to others, is of no great significance in itself, yet it is a genetic dimorphism. Because of its high frequency (which varies in different ethnic groups) it must be connected to some function of selective value. The ability to taste PTC itself is correlated with the ability to taste other bitter substances, many of which are toxic. Indeed, PTC itself is toxic, though not at the level of tasting it on litmus. Variation in PTC perception may reflect variation in dietary preferences throughout human evolution, and might correlate with susceptibility to diet-related diseases in modern populations. There is a statistical correlation between PTC tasting and liability to thyroid disease.

Fisher, Ford, and Huxley tested orangutans and chimpanzees for PTC perception with positive results, thus demonstrating the long-standing existence of this dimorphism. The PTC gene, which accounts for 85% of the tasting variance, has now been analysed for sequence variation with results which suggest selection is maintaining the morphism.

=== MHC molecules ===
The genes of the major histocompatibility complex (MHC) are highly polymorphic, and this diversity plays a very important role in resistance to pathogens. This is true for other species as well.

=== Cancer ===
DNA repair gene polymorphisms are associated with increased risk of colorectal cancer development. DNA repair gene polymorphisms also appear to influence the risk of lung cancer.

== Amphibians ==
=== Mid-dorsal stripe in frogs ===
Some frog species display polymorphism by presence/absence of a light stripe going along the central part of their back. A light mid-dorsal stripe has been shown to be determined by a simple dominant gene in Rana limnocharis, Rana ridibunda, Rana sylvatica and Rana arvalis; this means that individuals that are homozygous dominate or heterozygous display the stripe, whereas only homozygous recessive individuals are non-striped. The proportions of striped specimens in populations of some frogs show clinal variations. For example, the proportion of striped Rana sylvatica in North America generally increases towards the west and north. The variations in the proportion of different color may relate to either genetic-stochastic processes. or their adaptive importance. For different colour morphs of Acris crepitans, the hypothesis about the direct adaptive value of different colour morphs (for escaping predation) competes with the hypothesis that these morphs correlate with thermotolerance. Striped specimens Rana sylvatica, striped specimens better perform in open areas. Differences in the proportion of striped frogs in Rana arvalis are explained with physiological differences between the morphs. Striped recently metamorphosed frogs have a relatively large liver, in comparison with unstriped ones, and their weight increases more rapidly. Tadpoles of striped Rana arvalis need more time for completing metamorphosis but, after metamorphosis, their growth is faster than that of unstriped froglets. In a frog widespread in Turkey and the Caucasus, Rana macrocnemis, the proportion of frogs with the stripe increases with the altitude in mountains of the Lesser Caucasus, but not in the Greater Caucasus. Given the same altitude, non-striped frogs from the Greater Caucasus grow slower and maturate later than the striped frogs from the Lesser Caucasus, which provides them selective advantage in high mountains, but their tadpoles are likely to be less resistant to overheating than those of the non-striped frogs.

== Birds ==
=== Cuckoo ===
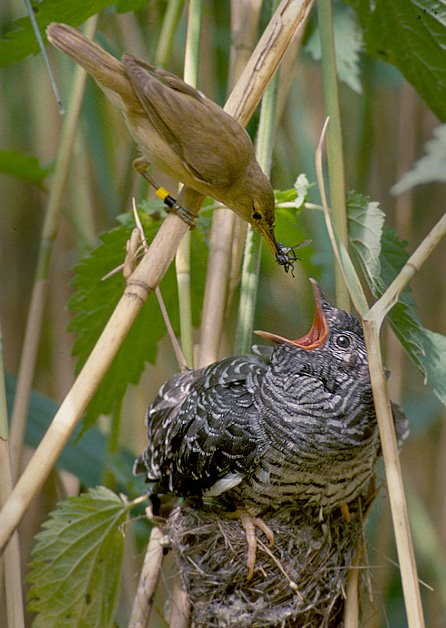
Reed warbler (Acrocephalus scirpaceus) feeding a cuckoo chick (Cuculus canorus)

Over fifty species in this family of birds practice brood parasitism; the details are best known in the common cuckoo (Cuculus canorus). In a season the female lays one egg in 15–20 other bird nests. She removes some or all of the host's clutch of eggs, and lays an egg which closely matches the host eggs. The diversity of the cuckoo's eggs is extraordinary, the forms resembling those of its most usual hosts. In Britain these are:

- Meadow pipit (Anthus pratensis): brown eggs speckled with darker brown.
- European robin (Erithacus rubecula): whitish-grey eggs speckled with bright red.
- Reed warbler (Acrocephalus scirpaceus): light dull green eggs blotched with olive.
- Common redstart (Phoenicurus phoenicurus): clear blue eggs.
- Hedge sparrow (Prunella modularis): clear blue eggs, unmarked, not mimicked. This bird is an uncritical fosterer; it tolerates in its nest eggs that do not resemble its own.

Each female cuckoo lays one type only; the same type laid by her mother. In this way female cuckoos are divided into groups (known as gentes, singular gens), each parasitising the host to which it is adapted. The male cuckoo mates with females from any gens; thus the population (all gentes) is interbreeding.

Egg colour is inherited by sex chromosome. In birds sex determination is ZZ/ZW, and unlike mammals, the heterogametic sex is the female. The determining gene (or super-gene) for the inheritance of egg colour is believed to be carried on the W chromosome, which is directly transmitted in the female line. The female behaviour in choosing the host species is set by imprinting after birth, a common mechanism in bird behaviour.

Ecologically, the system of multiple hosts maximises the egg-laying capacity of the population of cuckoos and extends the range of habitats where the cuckoo eggs may be raised successfully. Detailed work on the cuckoo started with E. Chance in 1922, and continues to the present day.

=== Darwin's finches ===
Whereas Darwin spent just five weeks in the Galápagos, and David Lack spent three months, Peter and Rosemary Grant and their colleagues have made research trips to the Galápagos for about thirty years, particularly studying Darwin's finches. The Española cactus finch (Geospiza conirostris) lives on Isla Genovesa (formerly Tower Island) which is formed from a shield volcano, and is home to a variety of birds. These birds, like all well-studied groups, show various kinds of morphism.

Males are dimorphic in song type: songs A and B are quite distinct. Also, males with song A have shorter bills than B males. This is also a clear difference. With these beaks males are able to feed differently on their favourite cactus, the prickly pear Opuntia. Those with long beaks are able to punch holes in the cactus fruit and eat the fleshy aril pulp which surrounds the seeds, whereas those with shorter beaks tear apart the cactus base and eat the pulp and any insect larvae and pupae (both groups eat flowers and buds). This dimorphism clearly maximises their feeding opportunities during the non-breeding season when food is scarce.

Territories of type A and type B males are random if not mated but alternate if mated: no two breeding males of the same song type shared a common boundary. This initially suggested the possibility of assortative mating by female choice. However, further work showed that "the choice of a male by a female is independent of any conditioning influence of her father's song type and there is no evidence of assortative mating by bill type... Hence there is no direct evidence of reproductive subdivision in the population". In 1999 Peter Grant agreed that "sympatric speciation [in this example] is unlikely to occur".

If the population is panmixic, then Geospiza conirostris exhibits a balanced genetic polymorphism and not, as originally supposed, a case of nascent sympatric speciation. The selection maintaining the polymorphism maximises the species' niche by expanding its feeding opportunity. The genetics of this situation cannot be clarified in the absence of a detailed breeding program, but two loci with linkage disequilibrium is a possibility.

Another interesting dimorphism is for the bills of young finches, which are either "pink" or "yellow". All species of Darwin's finches exhibit this morphism, which lasts for two months. No interpretation of this phenomenon is known.

=== White-throated sparrows ===
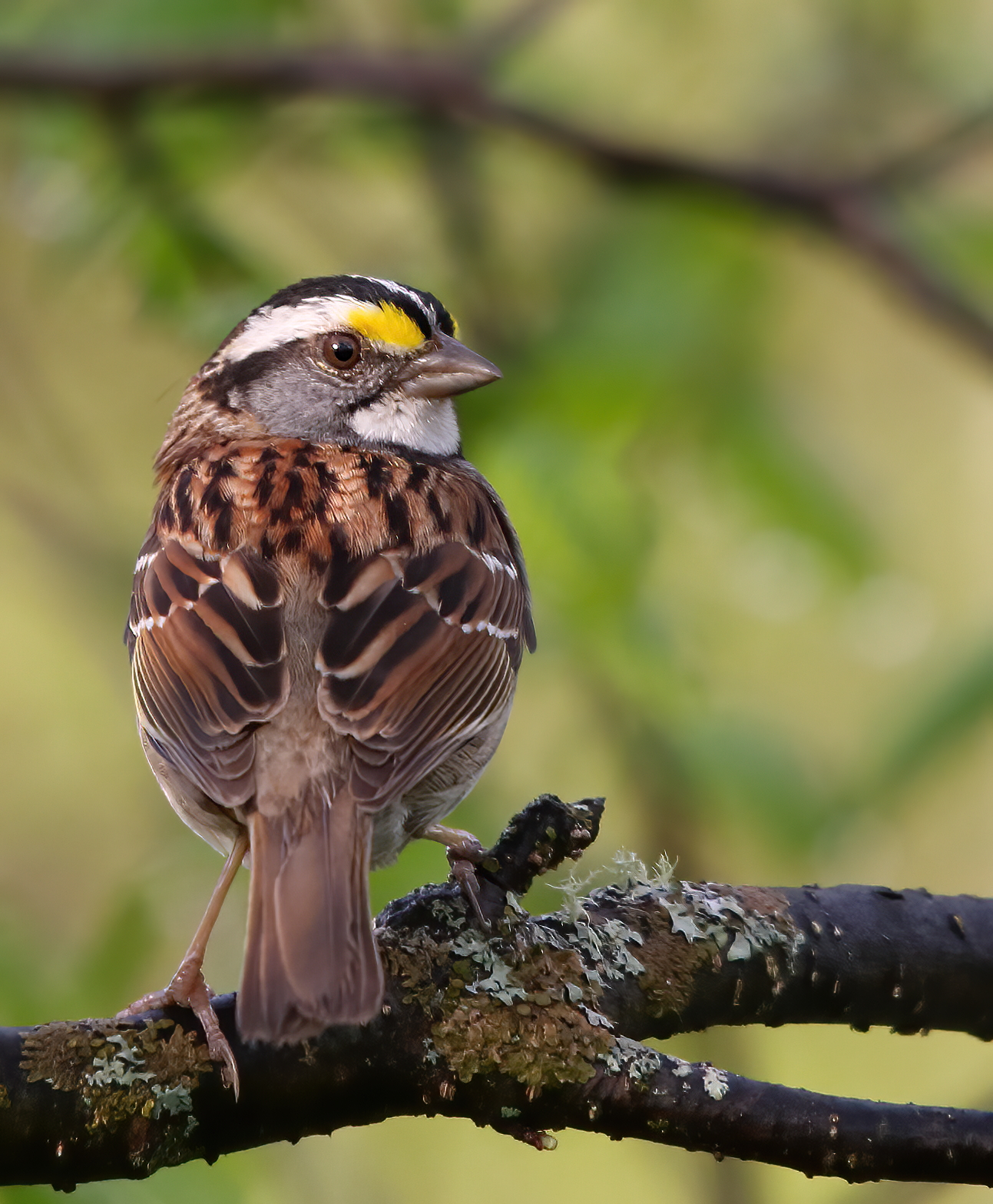
Zonotrichia albicollis black-and-white-striped morph

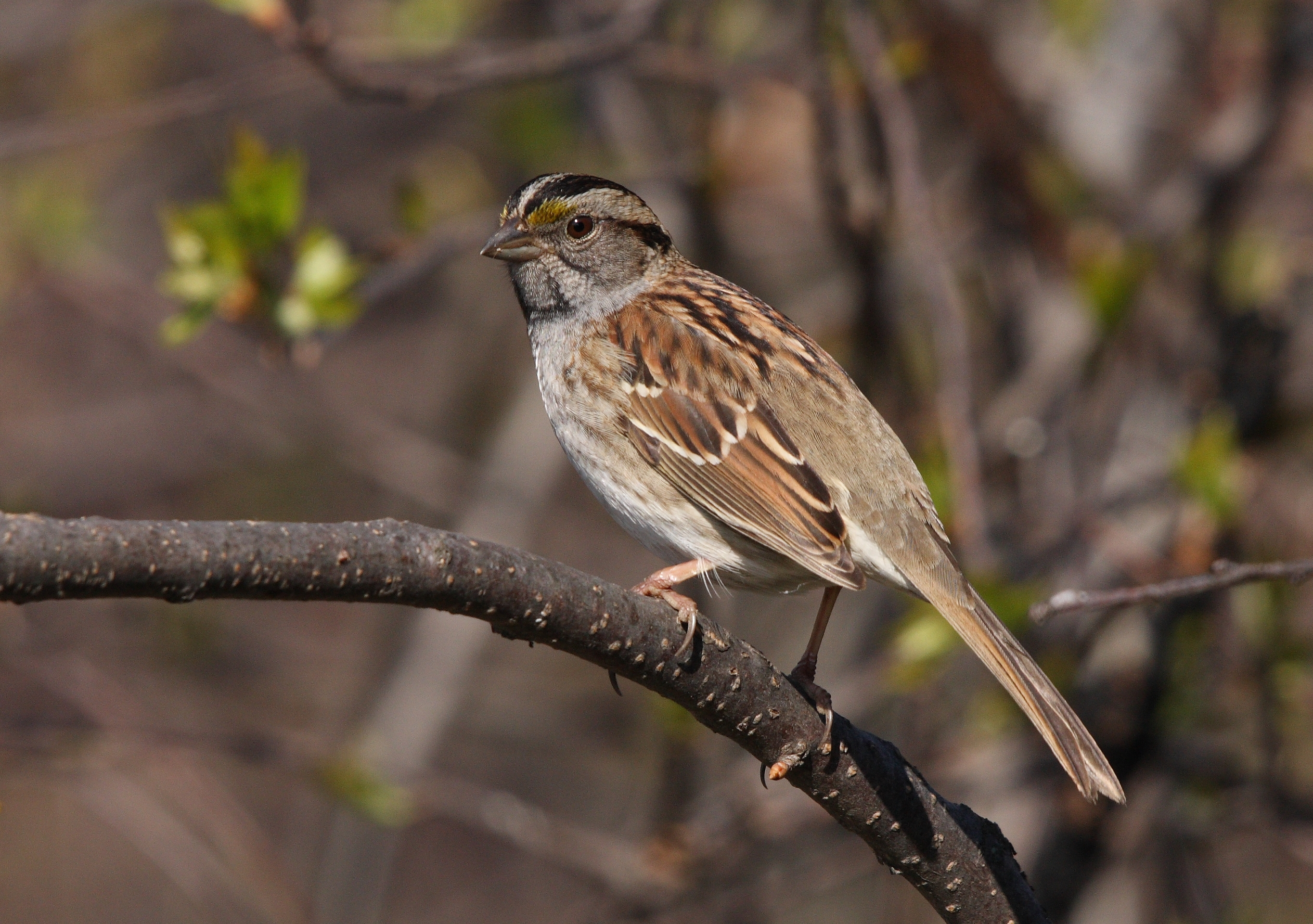
Zonotrichia albicollis brown-and-tan-striped morph

The white-throated sparrow (Zonotrichia albicollis), a passerine bird of the American sparrow family Passerellidae, shows a clear dimorphism in both sexes throughout its large range.

Their heads are either white-striped or tan-striped. These differences in plumage result from a balanced chromosomal inversion polymorphism; in white-striped (WS) birds, one copy of chromosome 2 is partly inverted, while in tan-striped (TS) birds, both copies are uninverted.

The plumage differences are paralleled by differences in behavior and breeding strategy. WS males sing more, are more aggressive and more frequently engage in extra-pair copulation than their TS counterparts. TS birds of both sexes provide more parental care than WS birds.

The polymorphism is maintained by negative assortative mating—each morph mates with its opposite. Dimorphic pairs may have an advantageous balance between parental care and aggressive territorial defense. In addition, as in many other polymorphisms, heterozygote advantage seems to help maintain this one; the proportion of WS birds homozygotic for the inversion is even lower than would be expected from the low frequency (4%) of pairings of the same morph.

In the underlying chromosomal polymorphism, the standard (ZAL2) and alternative (ZAL2m) arrangements differ by a pair of included pericentric inversions at least. ZAL2m suppresses recombination in the heterokaryotype and is evolving as a rare nonrecombining autosomal segment of the genome.

== Fish ==
=== Arctic char ===
Arctic char are notable for exhibiting numerous, seemingly distinct morphological variants or morphs throughout the range of the species. Consequently, Arctic char have been referred to as the 'most variable vertebrate on Earth'. These morphs are often sympatric within lakes or rivers. Morphs often vary significantly in size, shape and colour. Morphs often demonstrate differences in migratory behaviour, being resident or anadromous fish, and in feeding behaviour and niche placement. Morphs often interbreed, but they can also be reproductively isolated and represent genetically distinct populations, which have been cited as examples of incipient speciation.

== Insects ==
=== Ants ===
Ants exhibit a range of polymorphisms. First, there is their characteristic haplodiploid sex determination system, whereby all males are haploid, and all females diploid. Second, there is differentiation between both the females and males based mostly on feeding of larvae, which determines, for example, whether the imago is capable of reproduction. Lastly, there is differentiation of size and 'duties' (particularly of females), which are usually controlled by feeding and/or age, but which may sometimes be genetically controlled. Thus the order exhibits both genetic polymorphism and extensive polyphenism.

=== Chromosome polymorphism in Drosophila ===
In the 1930s Dobzhansky and his co-workers collected Drosophila pseudoobscura and D. persimilis from wild populations in California and neighbouring states. Using Painter's technique they studied the polytene chromosomes and discovered that the wild populations were polymorphic for chromosomal inversions. All the flies look alike whatever inversions they carry: this is an example of a cryptic polymorphism. Accordingly, Dobzhansky favoured the idea that the morphs became fixed in the population by means of Sewall Wright's drift. However, evidence rapidly accumulated to show that natural selection was responsible:

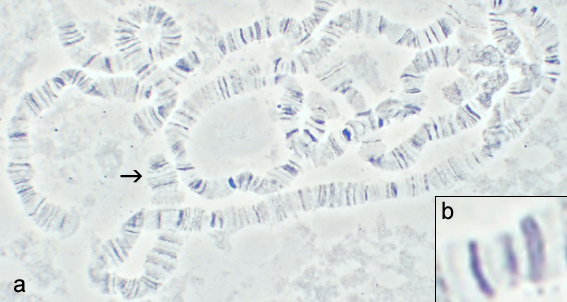
Drosophila polytene chromosome

1. Values for heterozygote inversions of the third chromosome were often much higher than they should be under the null assumption: if no advantage for any form the number of heterozygotes should conform to N_{s} (number in sample) = p^{2}+2pq+q^{2} where 2pq is the number of heterozygotes (see Hardy–Weinberg equilibrium).

2. Using a method invented by l'Heretier and Teissier, Dobzhansky bred populations in population cages, which enabled feeding, breeding and sampling whilst preventing escape. This had the benefit of eliminating migration as a possible explanation of the results. Stocks containing inversions at a known initial frequency can be maintained in controlled conditions. It was found that the various chromosome types do not fluctuate at random, as they would if selectively neutral, but adjust to certain frequencies at which they become stabilised. With D. persimilis he found that the caged population followed the values expected on the Hardy–Weinberg equilibrium when conditions were optimal (which disproved any idea of non-random mating), but with a restricted food supply heterozygotes had a distinct advantage.

3. Different proportions of chromosome morphs were found in different areas. There is, for example, a polymorph-ratio cline in D. robusta along an 18-mile (29 km) transect near Gatlinburg, TN passing from 1,000 feet (300 m) to 4,000 feet. Also, the same areas sampled at different times of year yielded significant differences in the proportions of forms. This indicates a regular cycle of changes which adjust the population to the seasonal conditions. For these results selection is by far the most likely explanation.

4. Lastly, morphs cannot be maintained at the high levels found simply by mutation, nor is drift a possible explanation when population numbers are high.

By the time Dobzhansky published the third edition of his book in 1951, he was persuaded that the chromosome morphs were being maintained in the population by the selective advantage of the heterozygotes, as with most polymorphisms. Later he made yet another interesting discovery. One of the inversions, known as PP, was quite rare up to 1946, but by 1958 its proportion had risen to 8%. Not only that, but the proportion was similar over an area of some 200,000 square miles (520,000 km^{2}) in California. This cannot have happened by migration of PP morphs from, say, Mexico (where the inversion is common) because the rate of dispersal (at less than 2 km/year) is of the wrong order. The change therefore reflected a change in prevailing selection whose basis was not yet known.

=== Hoverfly polymorphism ===
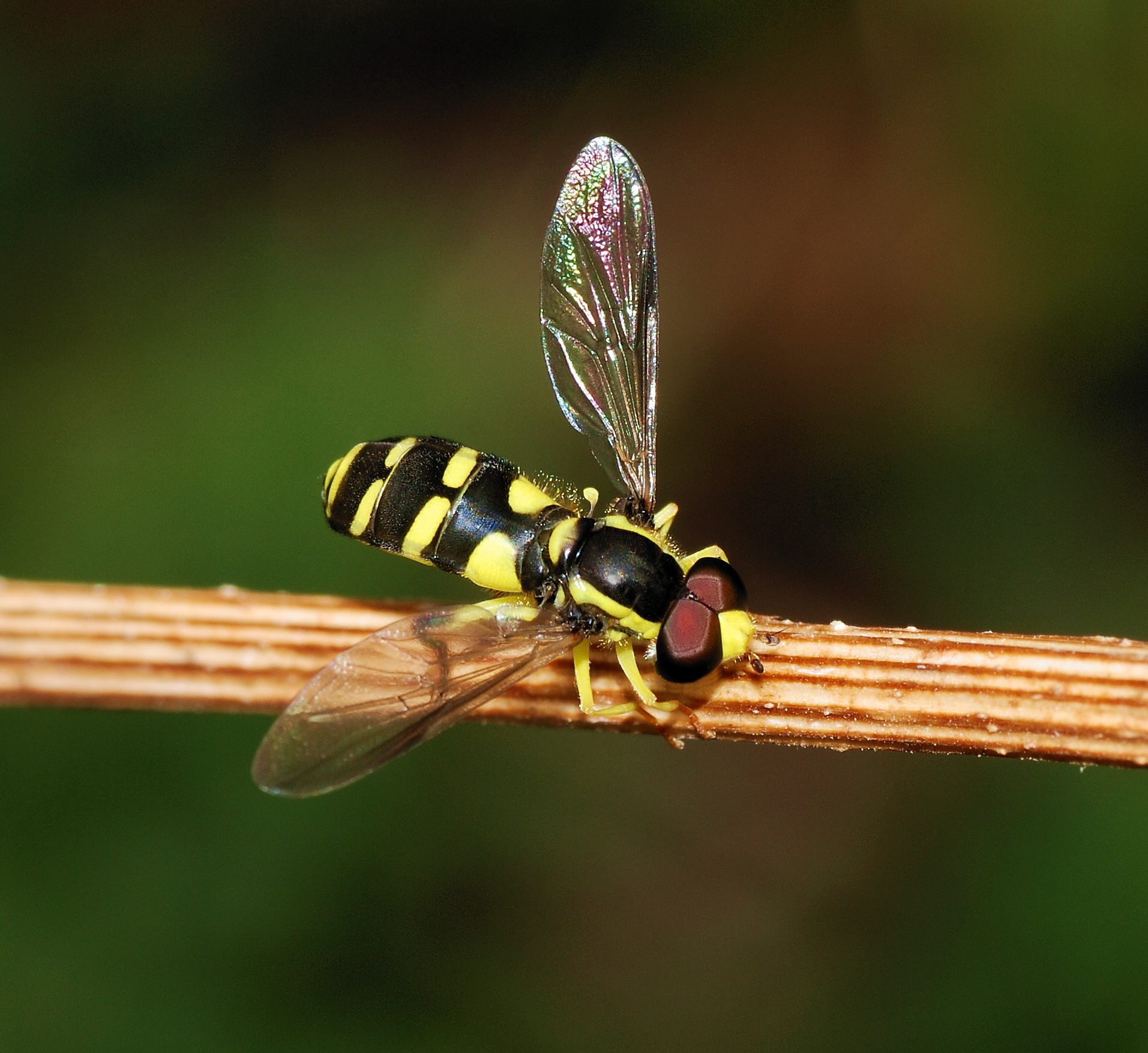
Xanthogramma pedissequum, a wasp mimic

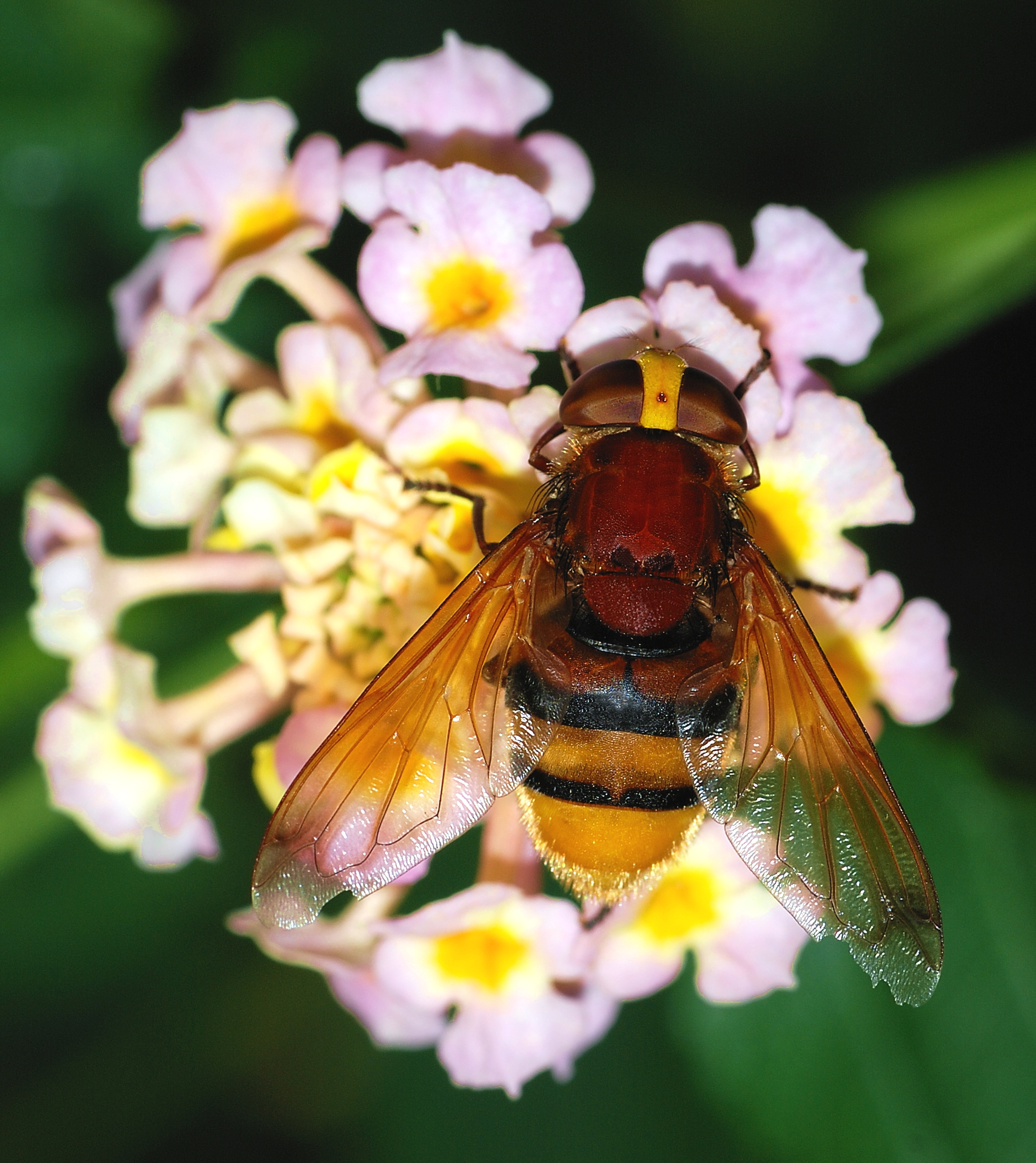
Volucella zonaria, a large bumblebee mimic

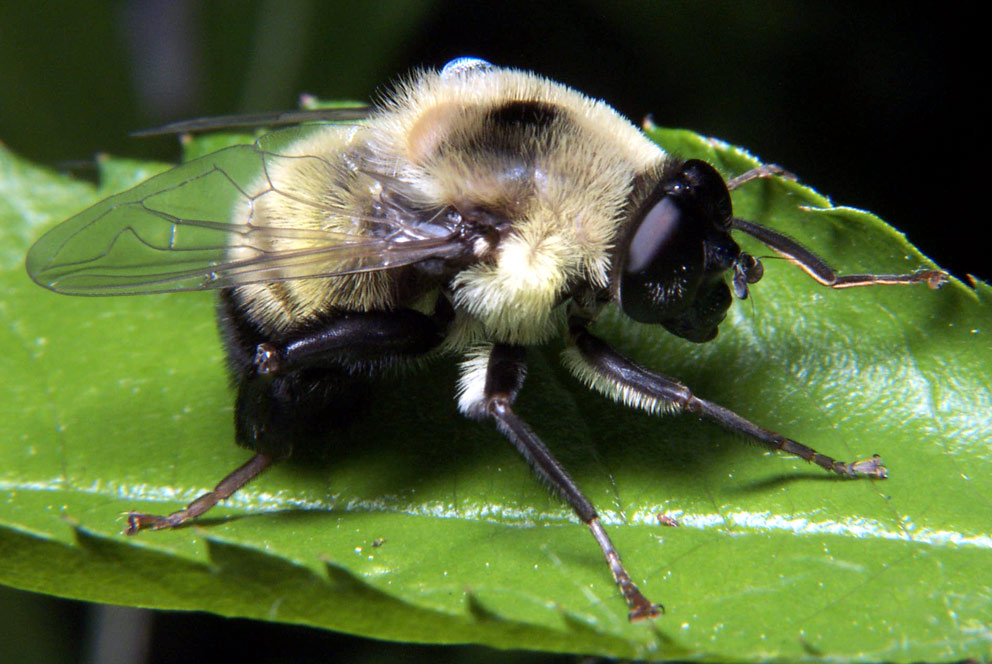
Mallota sp., a bumblebee mimic

Hoverfly mimics can be seen in almost any garden in the temperate zone. The Syrphidae are a large (5600+ species) family of flies; their imagoes feed on nectar and pollen, and are well known for their mimicry of social hymenoptera. The mimicry is Batesian in nature: hoverflies are palatable but hymenoptera are generally unpalatable and may also be protected by stingers and/or armour.

Many social wasp (Vespidae) species exhibit Müllerian mimicry, where a group of unpalatable species benefit from sharing the same kind of warning (aposematic) colouration. Wasps are decidedly noxious: nasty-tasting and with a painful sting. They form a Mullerian 'ring' of similarly coloured models; the wasps are often accompanied by clusters of hover-fly mimics, who tend to arrive at the flowers at a similar time of day, and whose flight pattern is passably similar to wasp flight.

Observers in a garden can see for themselves that hoverfly mimics are quite common, usually many times more common than the models, and are (to our sight) relatively poor mimics, often easy to distinguish from real wasps. However, it has been established in other cases that imperfect mimicry can confer significant advantage to the mimic, especially if the model is really noxious. Also, not only is polymorphism absent from these mimics, it is absent in the wasps also: these facts are presumably connected.

The situation with bumblebees (Bombus) is rather different. They too are unpalatable, in the sense of being difficult to eat: their body is covered with setae (like carpet pile) and is armoured; they are sometimes described as being 'non-food'. Mostler in 1935 carried out tests of their palatability: with the exception of specialist bee-eaters, adults of 19 species of birds ate only 2% of 646 bumblebees presented to them. After various trials, Mostler attributed their avoidance mainly to mechanical difficulties in handling: one young bird took 18 minutes to subdue, kill and eat a bumblebee.

Bumblebees form Mullerian rings of species, and they do often exhibit polymorphism. The hoverfly species mimicking bumblebees are generally accurate mimics, and many of their species are polymorphic. Many of the polymorphisms are different between the sexes, for example by the mimicry being limited to one sex only.

The question is, how can the differences between social wasp mimics and bumblebee mimics be explained? Evidently if model species are common, and have overlapping distributions, they are less likely to be polymorphic. Their mimics are widespread and develop a kind of rough and ready jack-of-all-trades mimicry. But if model species are less common and have patchy distribution they develop polymorphism; and their mimics match them more exactly and are polymorphic also. The issues are currently being investigated.

=== Peppered moth ===
The peppered moth, Biston betularia, is justly famous as an example of a population responding in a heritable way to a significant change in their ecological circumstances. E.B. Ford described peppered moth evolution as "one of the most striking, though not the most profound, evolutionary changes ever actually witnessed in nature".

Although the moths are cryptically camouflaged and rest during the day in unexposed positions on trees, they are predated by birds hunting by sight. The original camouflage (or crypsis) seems near-perfect against a background of lichen growing on trees. The sudden growth of industrial pollution in the nineteenth century changed the effectiveness of the moths' camouflage: the trees became blackened by soot, and the lichen died off. In 1848 a dark version of this moth was found in the Manchester area. By 1895 98% of the peppered moths in this area were black. This was a rapid change for a species that has only one generation a year.

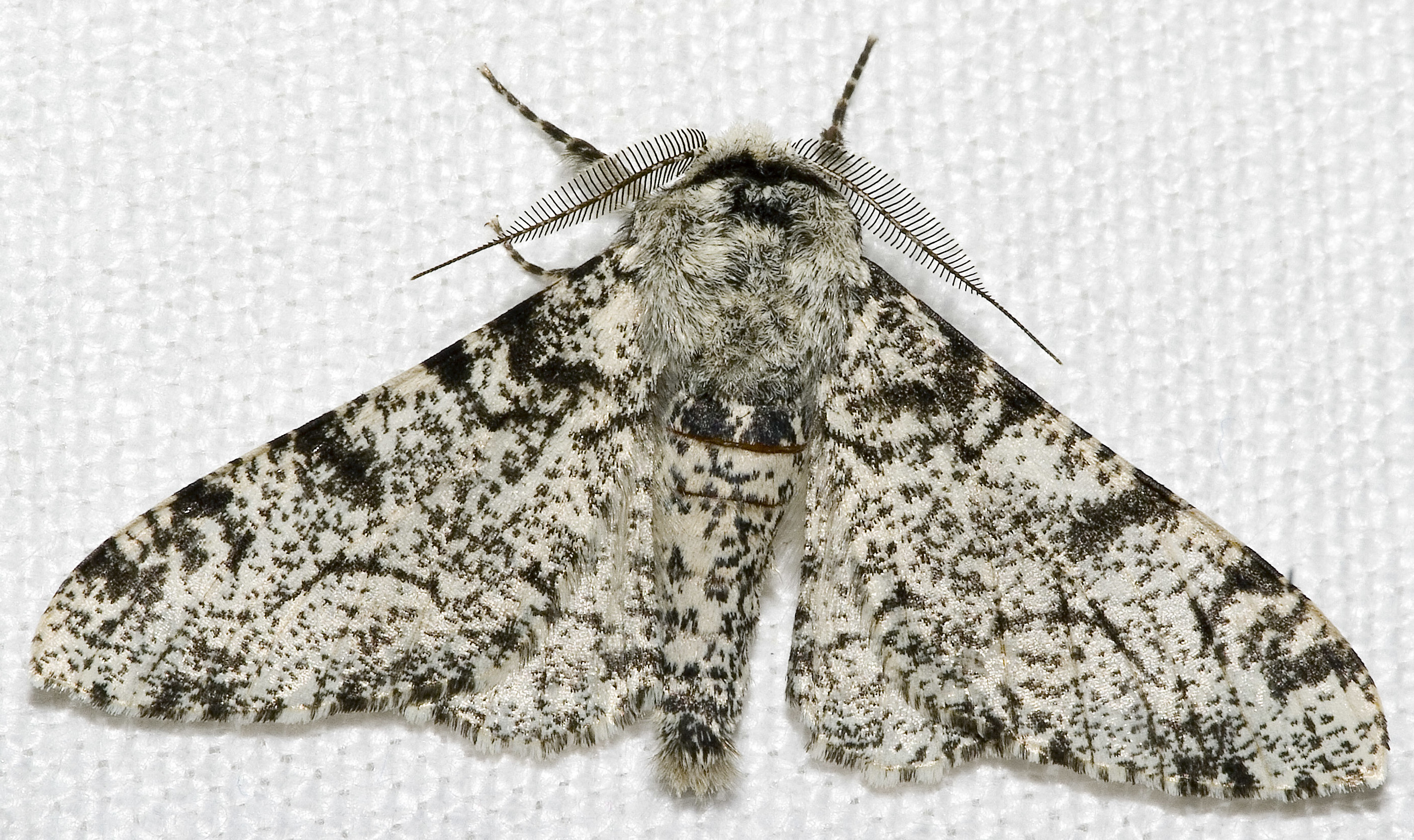
Biston betularia morpha typica, the standard light-coloured peppered moth.

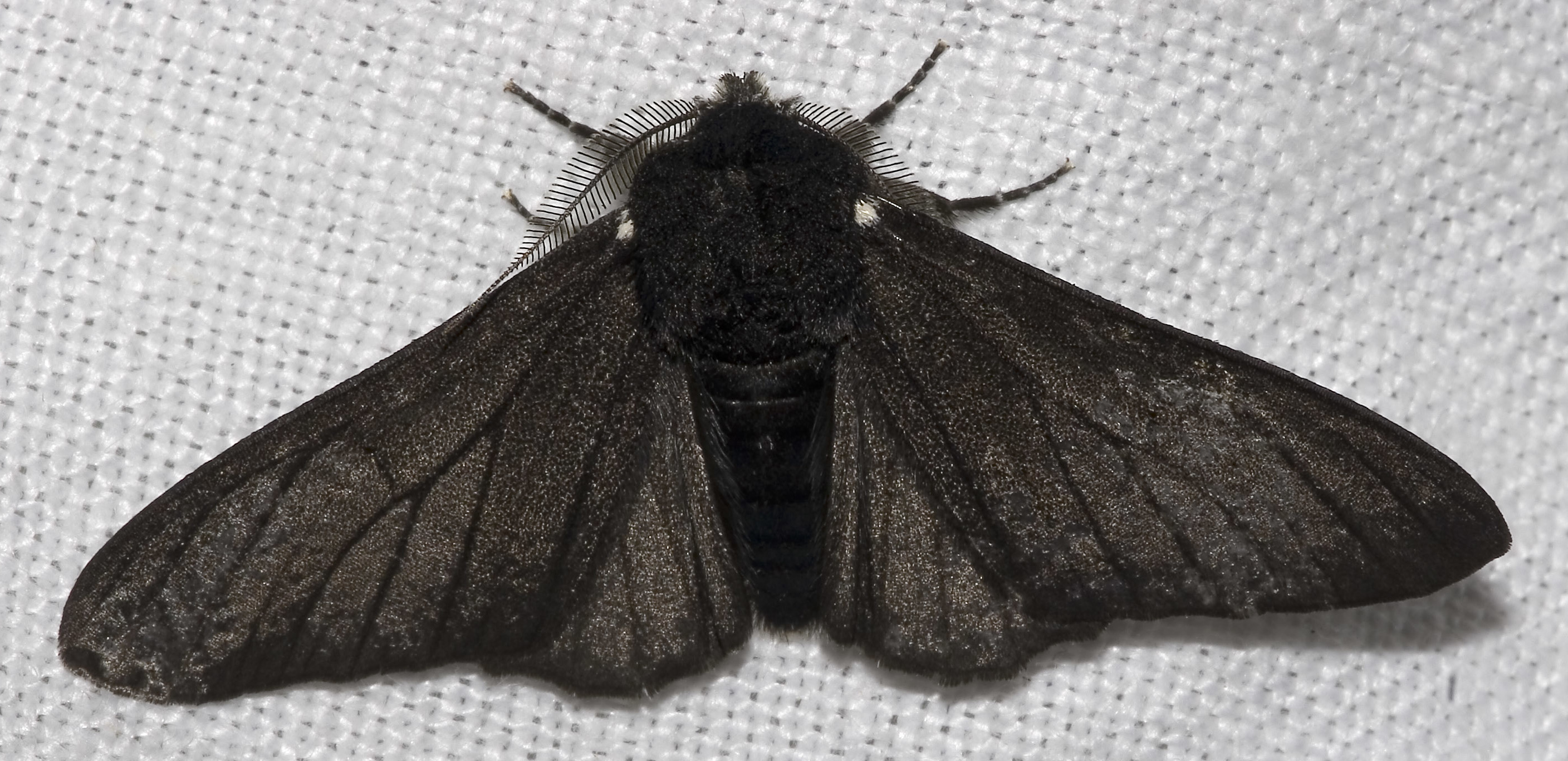
Biston betularia morpha carbonaria, the melanic peppered moth.

In Europe, there are three morphs: the typical white morph (betularia or typica), and carbonaria, the melanic black morph. They are controlled by alleles at one locus, with the carbonaria being dominant. There is also an intermediate or semi-melanic morph insularia, controlled by other alleles.

A key fact, not realised initially, is the advantage of the heterozygotes, which survive better than either of the homozygotes. This affects the caterpillars as well as the moths, in spite of the caterpillars being monomorphic in appearance (they are twig mimics). In practice heterozygote advantage puts a limit to the effect of selection, since neither homozygote can reach 100% of the population. For this reason, it is likely that the carbonaria allele was in the population originally, pre-industrialisation, at a low level. With the recent reduction in pollution, the balance between the forms has already shifted back significantly.

Another interesting feature is that the carbonaria had noticeably darkened after about a century. This was seen quite clearly when specimens collected about 1880 were compared with specimens collected more recently: clearly the dark morph has been adjusted by the strong selection acting on the gene complex. This might happen if a more extreme allele was available at the same locus; or genes at other loci might act as modifiers. We do not, of course, know anything about the genetics of the original melanics from the nineteenth century.

This type of industrial melanism has only affected such moths as obtain protection from insect-eating birds by resting on trees where they are concealed by an accurate resemblance to their background (over 100 species of moth in Britain with melanic forms were known by 1980). No species which hide during the day, for instance, among dead leaves, is affected, nor has the melanic change been observed among butterflies. This is, as shown in many textbooks, "evolution in action".

Much of the early work was done by Bernard Kettlewell, whose methods came under scrutiny later on. The entomologist Michael Majerus discussed criticisms made of Kettlewell's experimental methods in his 1998 book Melanism: Evolution in Action. This book was misrepresented in some reviews, and the story picked up by creationist campaigners.

Judith Hooper, in her controversial book Of Moths and Men (2002), implied that Kettlewell's work was fraudulent or incompetent. Careful studies of Kettlewell's surviving papers by Rudge (2005) and Young (2004) found that Hooper's accusation of fraud was unjustified, and that "Hooper does not provide one shred of evidence to support this serious allegation". Majerus himself described Of Moths and Men as "littered with errors, misrepresentations, misinterpretations and falsehoods". A suitably restrained 2004 summary of opinion mostly favoured predation as the main selective force.

Starting in 2000, Majerus conducted a detailed seven-year study of moths, experimenting to assess the various criticisms. He concluded that differential bird predation was a major factor responsible for the decline in carbonaria frequency compared to typica in Cambridge during the study period, and described his results as a complete vindication of the peppered moth story. He said, "If the rise and fall of the peppered moth is one of the most visually impacting and easily understood examples of Darwinian evolution in action, it should be taught. It provides after all the proof of evolution."

Current interpretation of the available evidence is that the peppered moth is in fact a valid example of natural selection and adaptation. It illustrates a polymorphic species maintaining adaptation to a varied and sometimes changing environment.

=== Two-spotted ladybird beetle ===
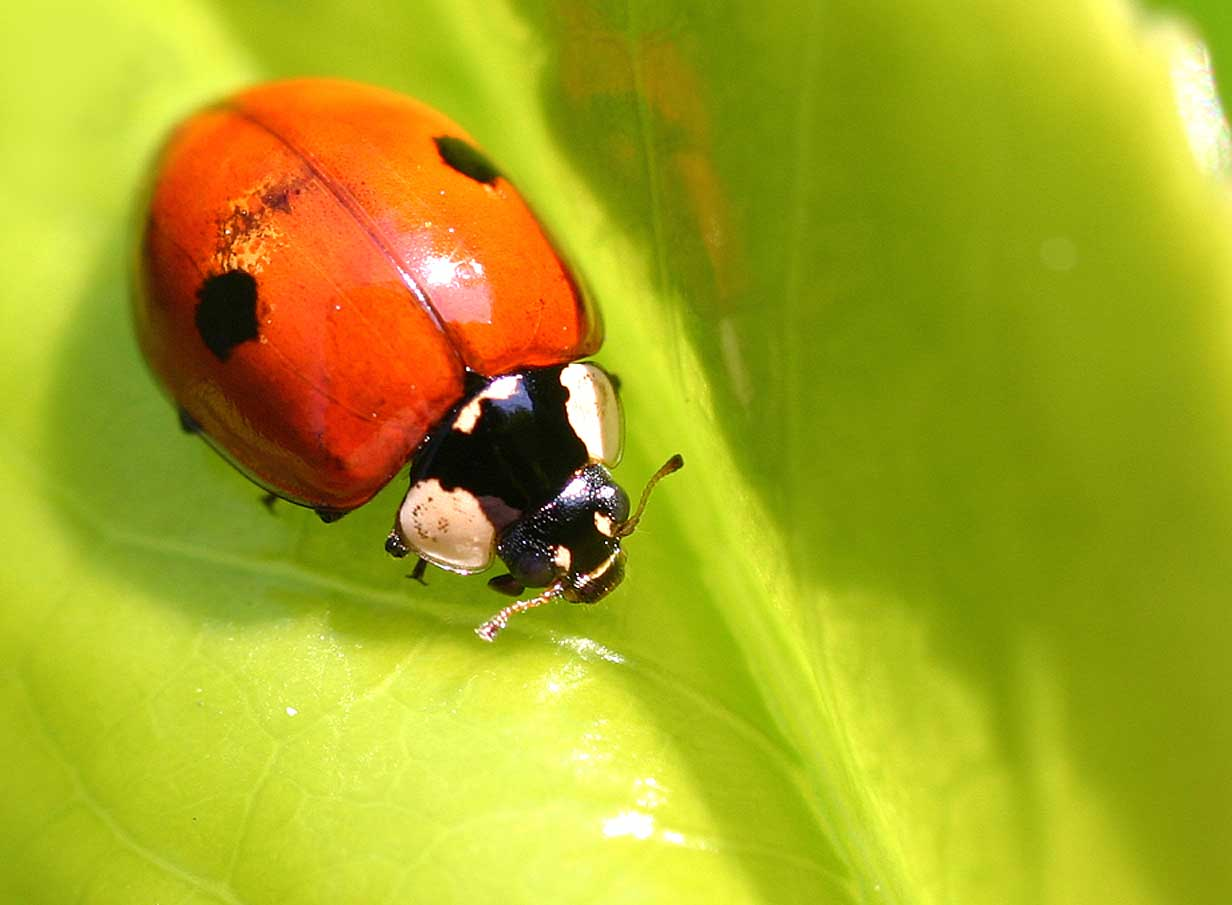
Adalia bipunctata red morph

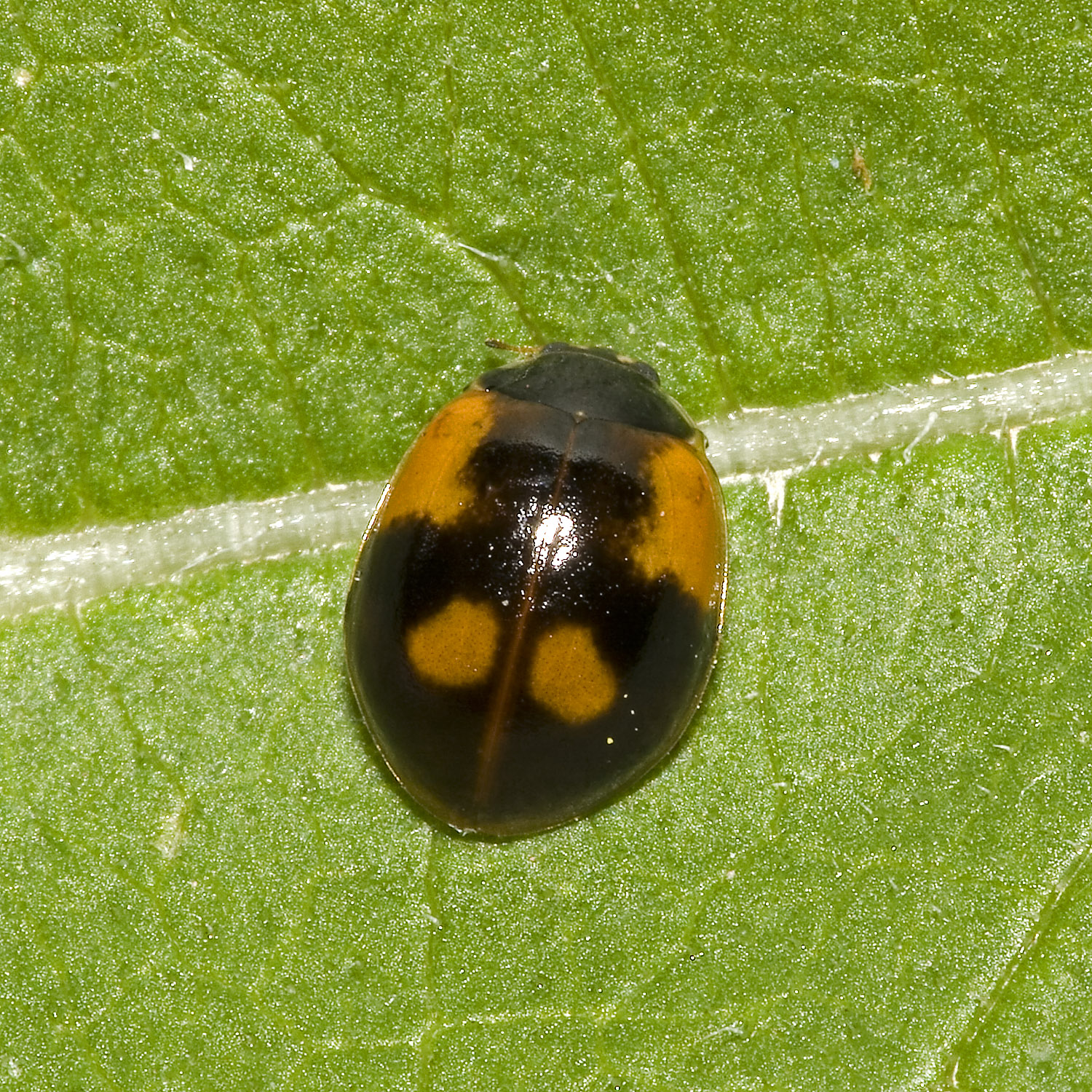
Adalia bipunctata black morph

Adalia bipunctata, the two-spotted ladybird, is highly polymorphic. Its basic form is red with two black spots, but it has many other forms, the most important being melanic, with black elytra and red spots. The curious fact about this morphism is that, although the melanic forms are more common in industrial areas, its maintenance has nothing to do with cryptic camouflage and predation. The Coccinellidae as a whole are highly noxious, and experiments with birds and other predators have found this species quite exceptionally distasteful. Therefore, their colour is warning (aposematic) colouration, and all the morphs are quite conspicuous against green vegetation. The field studies identify differing proportions of morphs at different times of year and in different places, which indicates a high level of selection. However, the basis of that selection is still not known for sure, though many theories have been proposed. Since all the morphs are aposematically coloured, it seems unlikely that the difference between the colour of morphs is directly under selection. Perhaps pleiotropic effects of the genes acting on colour also affect the beetle's physiology, and hence its relative fitness. A similar polymorphic system is found in many other species in this family: Harmonia axyridis is a good example.

=== Scarlet tiger moth ===
The scarlet tiger moth Callimorpha (Panaxia) dominula (family Arctiidae) occurs in continental Europe, western Asia and southern England. It is a day-flying moth, noxious-tasting, with brilliant warning colour in flight, but cryptic at rest. The moth is colonial in habit, and prefers marshy ground or hedgerows. The preferred food of the larvae is the herb Comfrey (Symphytum officinale). In England it has one generation per year.

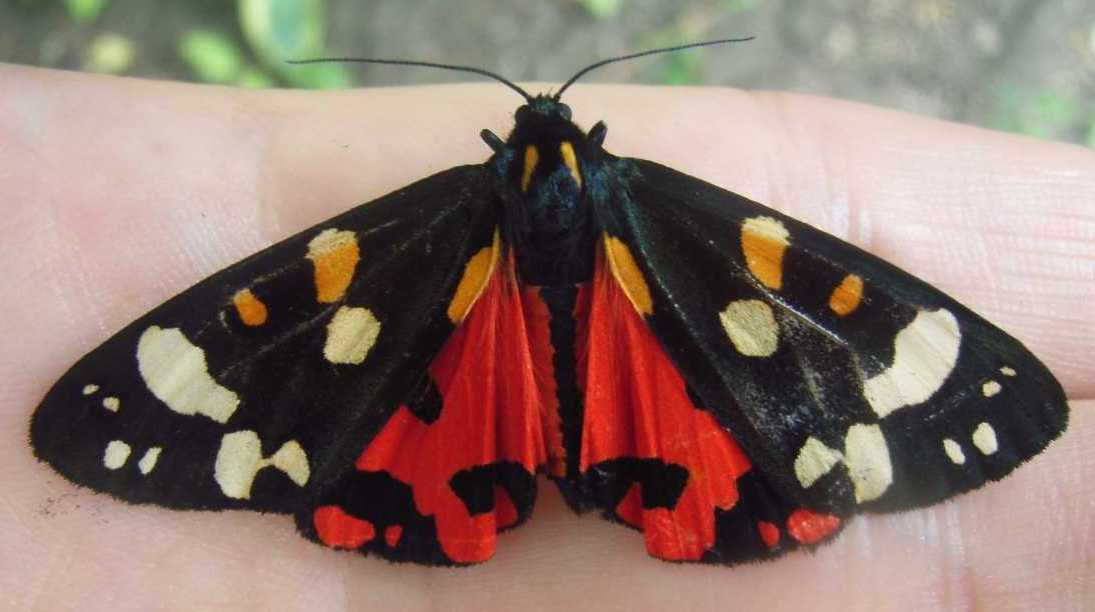
Callimorpha dominula morpha typica with spread wings. The red with black rear wings, revealed in flight, warn of its noxious taste. The front wings are cryptic, covering the rear wings at rest. Here the moth is resting but alert, and has jinked the front wings forward to reveal the warning flash.

The moth is known to be polymorphic in its colony at Cothill, about five miles (8 km) from Oxford, with three forms: the typical homozygote; the rare homozygote (bimacula) and the heterozygote (medionigra). It was studied there by Ford and later by Sheppard and their co-workers over many years. Data is available from 1939 to the present day, got by the usual field method of capture-mark-release-recapture and by genetic analysis from breeding in captivity. The records cover gene frequency and population-size for much of the twentieth century.

In this instance the genetics appears to be simple: two alleles at a single locus, producing the three phenotypes. Total captures over 26 years 1939–64 came to 15,784 homozygous dominula (i.e. typica), 1,221 heterozygous medionigra and 28 homozygous bimacula. Now, assuming equal viability of the genotypes 1,209 heterozygotes would be expected, so the field results do not suggest any heterozygous advantage. It was Sheppard who found that the polymorphism is maintained by selective mating: each genotype preferentially mates with other morphs. This is sufficient to maintain the system despite the fact that in this case the heterozygote has slightly lower viability.

== Mammals ==
=== Reindeer and caribou ===
Genetic polymorphism of serum transferrins in reindeer is used in population and genetic studies. Gene concentrations of alleles in populations of reindeer of the North-East of Siberia were compared with those in reindeer inhabiting Norway, the northern regions of the European part of the USSR and from North American caribou. Researchers found that frequencies of Tf alleles of the Siberian reindeer differed from all the others. It is possible that resistance to necrobacteriosis is related to concentrations of alleles in certain reindeer populations.

== Molluscs ==
=== Cepaea snails ===
Cepaea nemoralis and Cepaea hortensis are famous for the polymorphism of their shells in colour and banding pattern. The background colour of the shell is controlled by a series of multiple alleles, with brown dominant to pink, which is dominant to yellow. Bands may be present or absent and if present vary from one to five in number. Unbanded is dominant, and the number of bands is controlled by modifier genes at unlinked loci (see epistasis). The polymorphism exists within most sites, though the proportions of morphs varies considerably between sites. Some of the loci controlling the polymorphism are closely linked, forming a super-gene. It has been hypothesised that selection has brought the loci concerned together, since this avoids undesirable recombinants.

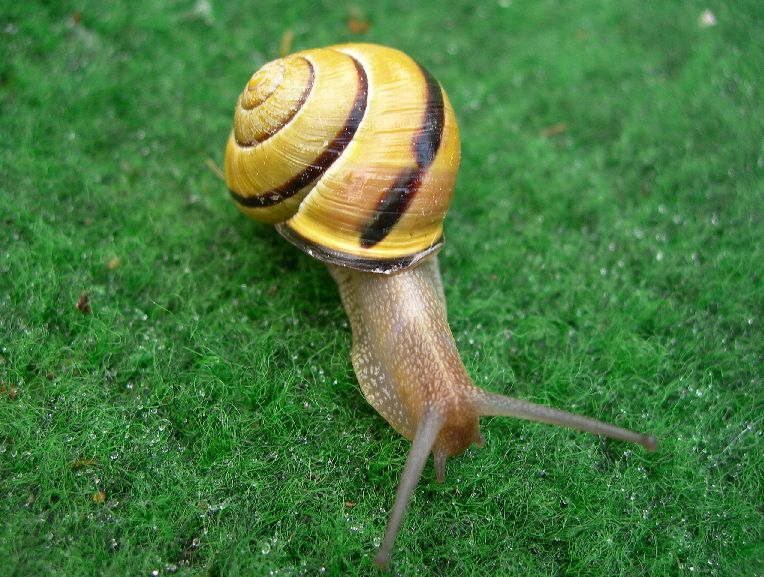
Cepaea nemoralis, dark yellow shell with single mid band.

In England, the snail is regularly predated by the song thrush Turdus philomelos, which breaks them open on thrush anvils (large stones). Here, fragments accumulate, permitting researchers to analyse the snails taken. The thrushes hunt by sight, and selectively capture those forms which stand out against the background, so predation may be one factor influencing the different proportion of phenotypes (morphs) found in woodland than in open habitats.

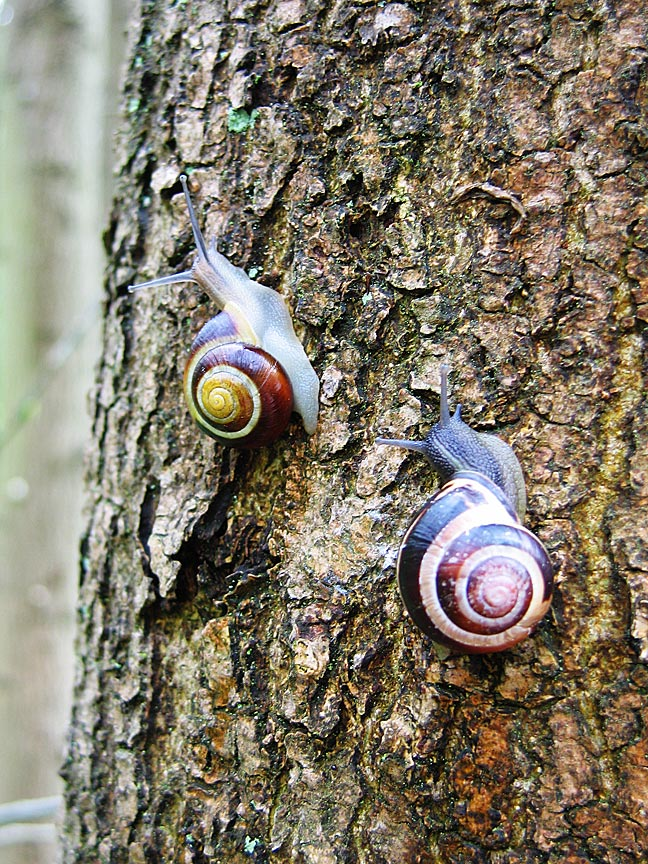
Two active Cepaea snails

In addition, there is evidence of apostatic selection, with the birds preferentially taking the most common morph. This is the 'search image' effect, where a visual predator persists in targeting the morph which it had most often found. Apostatic selection could explain the polymorphism within sites, but song thrushes are not present everywhere.

Dark-coloured shells are at greater risk of overheating in the sun. This "climatic selection" provides an alternative explanation for the observed pattern of paler shells in open habitats, and also explains the broad trend of paler shells at more southern latitudes (in C. nemoralis, but not C. hortensis).

Different colour morphs occupy different microhabitats, which provides another explanation for why different morphs coexist within a site. However, non-adaptive explanations for this variation are also plausible, because it takes many generations for natural selection to weed out less fit morphs, and this may be disrupted by fluctuating selection and occasional dispersal from adjacent habitats. Likewise chance founder effects are now the preferred explanation for the area effects that puzzled early researchers: a consistent ratio of morphs may occur over a wide area, but then suddenly switch to another ratio in an adjacent area despite no obvious change in habitat.

== Plants ==
=== Heterostyly ===
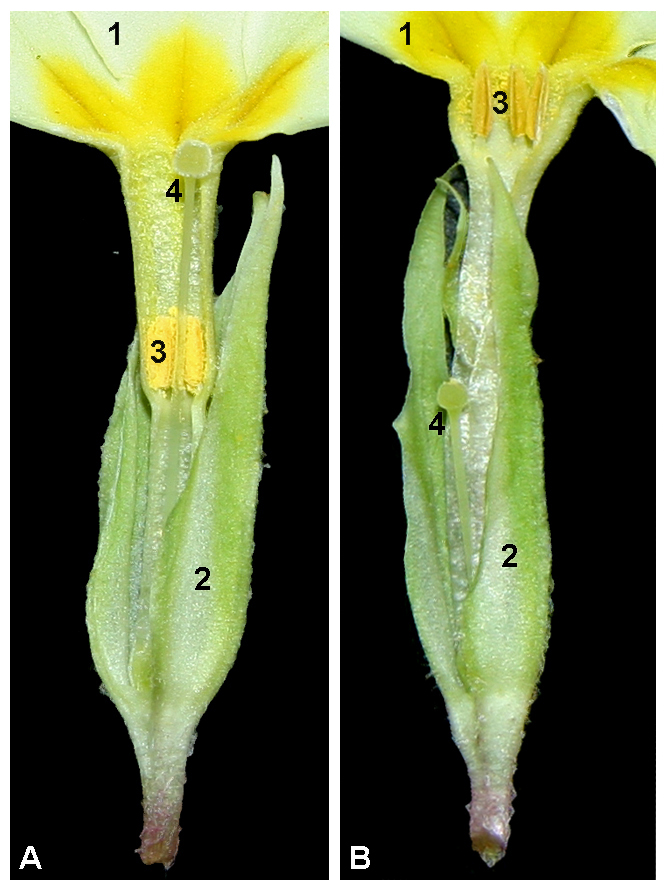
Dissection of thrum and pin flowers of Primula vulgaris

An example of a botanical genetic polymorphism is heterostyly, in which flowers occur in different forms with different arrangements of the pistils and the stamens. The system is called heteromorphic self-incompatibility, and the general 'strategy' of stamens separated from pistils is known as herkogamy.

Pin and thrum heterostyly occurs in dimorphic species of Primula, such as P. vulgaris. There are two types of flower. The pin flower has a long style bearing the stigma at the mouth and the stamens halfway down; and the thrum flower has a short style, so the stigma is halfway up the tube and the stamens are at the mouth. So when an insect in search of nectar inserts its proboscis into a long-style flower, the pollen from the stamens stick to the proboscis in exactly the part that will later touch the stigma of the short-styled flower, and vice versa.

Another most important property of the heterostyly system is physiological. If thrum pollen is placed on a thrum stigma, or pin pollen on a pin stigma, the reproductive cells are incompatible and relatively little seed is set. Effectively, this ensures out-crossing, as described by Darwin. Quite a lot is now known about the underlying genetics; the system is controlled by a set of closely linked genes which act as a single unit, a super-gene. All sections of the genus Primula have heterostyle species, altogether 354 species out of 419. Since heterostyly is characteristic of nearly all races or species, the system is at least as old as the genus.

Between 1861 and 1863, Darwin found the same kind of structure in other groups: flax (and other species of Linum); and in purple loosestrife and other species of Lythrum. Some of the Lythrum species are trimorphic, with one style and two stamens in each form.

Heterostyly is known in at least 51 genera of 18 families of Angiosperms.

=== Heterocarpy ===
Another example is heterocarpy, in which two or more different fruit morphs occur within an individual or population.

=== Heterospermy ===
Heterospermy is the occurrence of two or more different types of seed within an individual (e.g. as in Calendula officinalis) or population.

=== Heterophylly ===
Heterophylly is the presence of two or more different forms of leaves within an individual. Heteroblasty is the occurrence of distinct leaf types at different stages of the life cycle. Other forms are seasonal heterophylly, distinctions between basal and cauline foliage, and between the foliage of old wood and new wood.

== Reptiles ==
=== Common side-blotched lizards ===
Male common side-blotched lizards (Uta stansburiana) exhibit polymorphism in their throat pigmentation, and these different phenotypes are correlated with different mating strategies. Orange-throated males are the largest and most aggressive, defending large territories and keeping harems of females. Blue-throated males are of intermediate size, and guard smaller territories containing only a single female. Yellow-throated males are the smallest, and instead of holding territories they mimic females in order to sneak matings away from the other two morphs. The balance between these three morphs is maintained by frequency-dependent selection.

=== Common wall lizards ===
The common wall lizard (Podarcis muralis) displays polymorphism and has six distinct morphs which vary by the colour of their throat and underbelly (underbelly colouration seen predominantly in males). There are three "pure" morphs of colours: red, yellow and white and three "intermediate" morphs which are a combination of the colours: white-red, white-yellow and red-yellow.

=== Ctenophorus decresii ===
The Ctenophorus decresii lizard displays polymorphism with varying colors of their throats. The throat colors range from white and gray to bright colors of red, orange, or blue. The diversity in throat color is due to a combination of sexual selection and natural selection.

=== Ctenophorus pictus ===
Male Ctenophorus pictus lizards display different colors. The most common are red and yellow, but colors can range from brown to orange to red/orange. These morphs are maintained in nature through a combination of selective factors: natural selection and sexual selection.

=== Viviparous lizards ===
Viviparous lizards display color polymorphism in three ventral colors: yellow, orange, and a mixture of the two. These color morphs respond to variation in density frequency-dependence within their environment.
