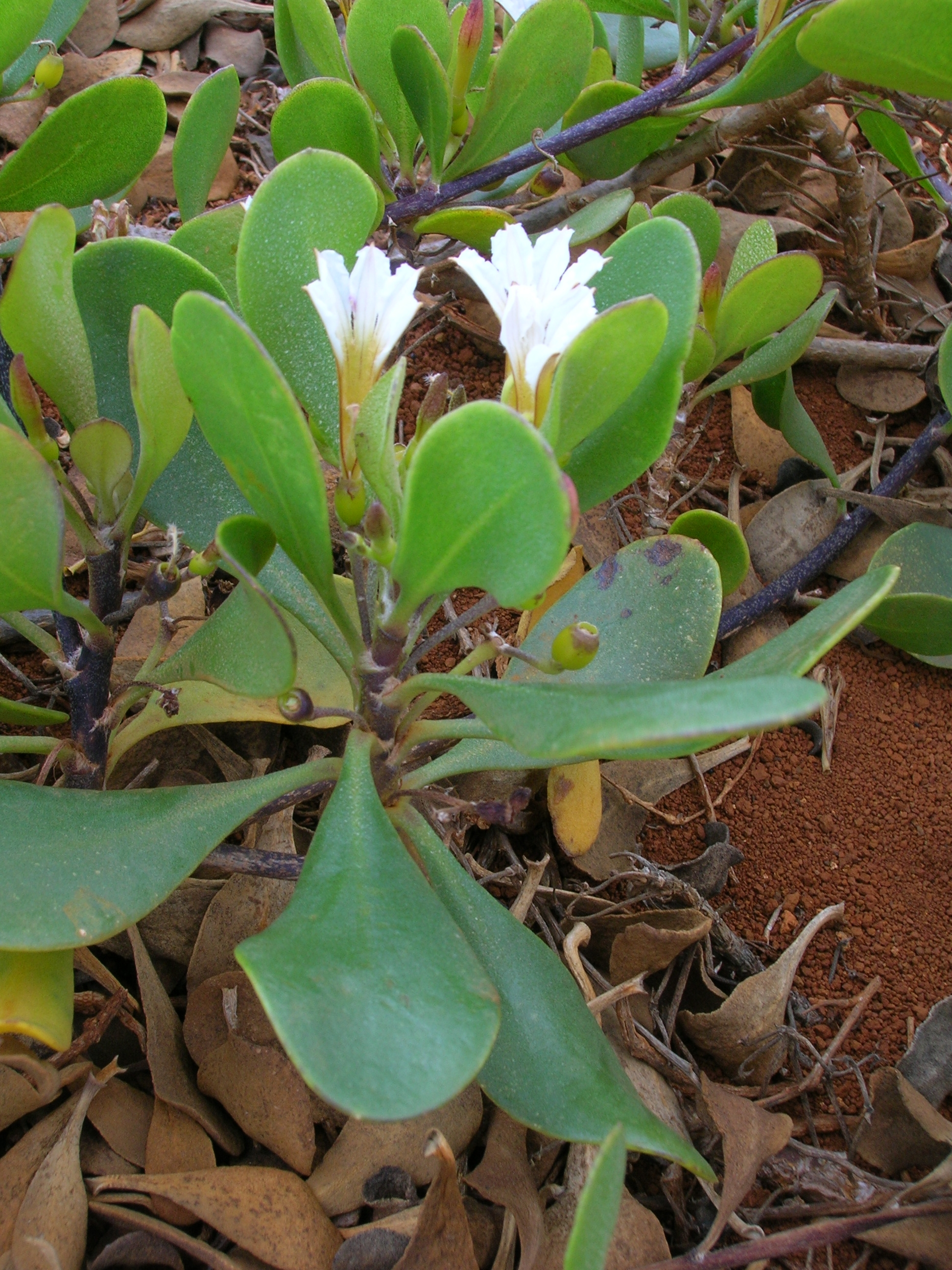

Conservation status
- Endangered (ESA)

Scientific classification
- Kingdom: Plantae
- Clade: Tracheophytes
- Clade: Angiosperms
- Clade: Eudicots
- Clade: Asterids
- Order: Asterales
- Family: Goodeniaceae
- Genus: Scaevola
- Species: S. coriacea

Binomial name
- Scaevola coriacea Nutt., 1842

Synonyms
- Lobelia coriacea Kuntze

= Scaevola coriacea =

Dwarf naupaka

Species of flowering plant

Scaevola coriacea, the dwarf naupaka, is one of the ten Scaevolas (flowering plants in the Goodenia family, Goodeniaceae), that are endemic to Hawaii.

It was first described in 1842 by Thomas Nuttall, and its specific epithet, coriacea, derives from the Latin, corium, which means leather, and describes the tough, thick, leathery leaves.

== Description ==
Dwarf naupaka is a low, flat-lying perennial herb. Its older stems are somewhat woody, and the succulent leaves are oval-shaped, relatively far apart, and smooth or somewhat scaly with rounded tips. Flowers occur in branched inflorescences from the point of leaf attachment in groups of one to three.

== Conservation ==
Today, dwarf naupaka exists only on Maui and two offshore islets. Historically, it could be found on six islands. The total population is less than 300 plants, making dwarf naupaka an endangered species.
