= New Naturalist =

Series of monograph books published 1945 on a variety of UK natural history topics

Cover of the first book in the series, E. B. Ford's famous Butterflies

The New Naturalist Library (also known as The New Naturalists) is a series of books published by Collins in the United Kingdom, on a variety of natural history topics relevant to the British Isles. The aim of the series at the start was: "To interest the general reader in the wild life of Britain by recapturing the inquiring spirit of the old naturalists." An editors' preface to a 1952 monograph says: "An object of the New Naturalist series is the recognition of the many-sidedness of British natural history, and the encouragement of unusual and original developments of its forgotten or neglected facets."

== History ==
The first volume to appear was E. B. Ford's Butterflies in 1945. The authors of this series are usually eminent experts, often professional scientists. This gives the series authority, and many are or have been authoritative introductory textbooks on a subject for some years. The books are written in scientific style, but are intended to be readable by the non-specialist, and are an early example of popular science in the media.

The books of the series have had considerable influence on many students who later became professional biologists, such as W. D. Hamilton and Mike Majerus. The latter was inspired by Ford's Butterflies and Moths, and has since added two volumes of his own to the series.

A parallel series known as the New Naturalist Monograph Library (and often referred to as The New Naturalist Special Volumes) was also published. Its aim was to cover "in greater detail... a single species or group of species". There have been no additions to the Monograph Library since 1971.

Volume 82 of the main series, The New Naturalists, described the series to date, with authors' biographies and a guide to collecting the books.

The original editorial board consisted of Julian Huxley, James Fisher, Dudley Stamp, John Gilmour and Eric Hosking. Until 1985, the highly characteristic dust jacket illustrations were by Rosemary and Clifford Ellis; since then they have been by Robert Gillmor.

Being a numbered series, with a very low print run for some volumes, the books are highly collectable. Second-hand copies of the rarer volumes, in good condition, can command high prices. The 100th volume, Woodlands by Oliver Rackham was published in 2006. Woodlands (volume 100) was also published in 2006 as a "leatherbound" edition, limited to 100 copies. In fact it was fake leather. The second "leatherbound" New Naturalist - Dragonflies by Philip Corbet and Stephen Brooks - was published in 2008. The (fake) leather edition of Dragonflies (volume 106) was initially limited to 400 copies, which was subsequently limited to 303, and finally to 250. According to the New Naturalist website only 217 were actually sold and the remaining unsold stock is being kept secure at HarperCollins's offices. HarperCollins continue to produce limited numbers of "leatherbound" editions of all volumes published since Dragonflies, but only from Islands (volume 109) was real leather actually used. All recent volumes have only 50 leatherbound copies.

The series won the 2007 British Book Design and Production Award for "brand or series identity", and in 2008 the official website was launched, with features including the latest news, a members only area with access to exclusive content and downloads, and a forum.

In around 1990, Bloomsbury produced a series of facsimile editions, as hardbacks with new dustjacket designs, and with all plates in black and white, including those which were originally in colour.

== Main series ==
(B) refers to the Bloomsbury reprints.

Number	Title	Author(s)	Editions
1	Butterflies	E. B. Ford	1945, 1946, 1957, 1977, 1990 (B)
2	British Game	Brian Vesey-Fitzgerald	1946
3	London's Natural History	R. S. R. Fitter	1945, 1990 (B)
4	Britain's Structure and Scenery	L. Dudley Stamp	1946, 1947, 1949, 1955, 1960, 1967
5	Wild Flowers	John Gilmour and Max Walters	1954, 1955, 1962, 1969, 1973, 1990 (B)
6a	Natural History in the Highlands and Islands	F. Fraser Darling	1947
6b	The Highlands and Islands	F. Fraser Darling and J. M. Boyd	1964, 1973, 1989 (B)
7	Mushrooms and Toadstools	John Ramsbottom	1953, 1989 (B)
8	Insect Natural History	A. D. Imms	1947, 1956, 1971, 1990 (B)
9	A Country Parish	A. W. Boyd	1951
10	British Plant Life	W. B. Turrill	1948, 1958, 1962, 1989 (B)
11	Mountains and Moorlands	W. H. Pearsall	1950, 1989 (B)
12	The Sea Shore	C. M. Yonge	1949, 1966, 1990 (B)
13	Snowdonia	F. J. North, B. Campbell and R. Scott	1949
14	The Art of Botanical Illustration	Wilfrid Blunt	1950
15	Life in Lakes and Rivers	T. T. Macan and E. B. Worthington	1951, 1968, 1974, 1990 (B)
16	Wild Flowers of Chalk and Limestone	J. E. Lousley	1950, 1969, 1989 (B)
17	Birds and Men	Max Nicholson	1951, 1990 (B)
18a	A Nat. Hist. of Man in Britain	H. J. Fleure	1951
18b	A Natural History of Man in Britain	H. J. Fleure and Margaret Davies	1970, 1989 (B)
19	Wild Orchids of Britain	V. S. Summerhayes	1951, 1968
20	The British Amphibians and Reptiles	Malcolm Smith	1951, 1954, 1964, 1969, 1972
21	British Mammals	L. Harrison Matthews	1952, 1968, 1989 (B)
22	Climate and the British Scene	Gordon Manley	1952
23	An Angler's Entomology	J. R. Harris	1952, 1956, 1990 (B)
24	Flowers of the Coast	Ian Hepburn	1952
25	The Sea Coast	J. A. Steers	1953, 1954, 1962, 1969
26	The Weald	S. W. Wooldridge and F. Goldring	1953
27	Dartmoor	L. A. Harvey and D. St Leger-Gordon	1953, 1962
28	Sea-Birds	James Fisher and R. M. Lockley	1954, 1989 (B)
29	The World of the Honeybee	Colin G. Butler	1954
30	Moths	E. B. Ford	1954, 1967, 1972
31	Man and the Land	L. Dudley Stamp	1955, 1964, 1969
32	Trees, Woods and Man	H. L. Edlin	1956, 1966, 1970
33	Mountain Flowers	John Raven and Max Walters	1956
34	The Open Sea: The World of Plankton	Alister Hardy	1956, 1970
35	The World of the Soil	Sir E. John Russell	1957, 1959, 1963, 1967, 1971
36	Insect Migration	C. B. Williams	1958, 1965
37	The Open Sea: Fish & Fisheries	Alister Hardy	1959, 1964, 1970
38	The World of Spiders	W. S. Bristowe	1958
39	The Folklore of Birds	Edward A. Armstrong	1958
40	Bumblebees	John B. Free and C.G. Butler	1959
41	Dragonflies	Philip S. Corbet, Cynthia Longfield and N. W. Moore	1960
42	Fossils	H. H. Swinnerton	1960, 1989 (B)
43	Weeds and Aliens	Sir Edward Salisbury	1961, 1964
44	The Peak District	K. C. Edwards	1962, 1974, 1990 (B)
45	The Common Lands of England and Wales	W. G. Hoskins and L. Dudley Stamp	1963
46	The Broads	A.E. Ellis	1965
47	The Snowdonia National Park	W. M. Condry	1966, 1967
48	Grass and Grassland	Ian Moore	1966
49	Nature Conservation in Britain	L. Dudley Stamp	1969, 1974
50	Pesticides and Pollution	Kenneth Mellanby	1967, 1970
51	Man and Birds	R. K. Murton	1971
52	Woodland Birds	Eric Simms	1971, 1990 (B)
53	The Lake District	W. H. Pearsall and W. Pennington	1973, 1989 (B)
54	The Pollination of Flowers	Michael Proctor and Peter Yeo	1973
55	Finches	Ian Newton	1972
56	Pedigree: Words from Nature	Stephen Potter and Laurens Sargent	1973
57	British Seals	H. R. Hewer	1974
58	Hedges	E. Pollard, M. D. Hooper and Norman W. Moore	1974
59	Ants	M. V. Brian	1977
60	British Birds of Prey	Leslie H. Brown	1976, 1989 (B)
61	Inheritance and Natural History	R. J. Berry	1977, 1990 (B)
62	British Tits	Chris Perrins	1979
63	British Thrushes	Eric Simms	1978
64	The Natural History of Shetland	R. J. Berry and J. Laughton Johnston	1980
65	Waders	W. G. Hale	1980
66	The Natural History of Wales	William M. Condry	1982, 1990 (B)
67	Farming and Wildlife	Kenneth Mellanby	1981
68	Mammals in the British Isles	L. Harrison Matthews	1982
69	Reptiles and Amphibians in Britain	Deryk Frazer	1983, 1989 (B)
70	The Natural History of Orkney	R. J. Berry	1985
71	British Warblers	Eric Simms	1985
72	Heathlands	Nigel Webb	1986
73	The New Forest	Colin R. Tubbs	1986
74	Ferns	Christopher N. Page	1988
75	Freshwater Fishes	P. S. Maitland and R. N. Campbell	1992
76	The Hebrides	J. M. Boyd and I. L. Boyd	1990
77	The Soil	B. Davis, N. Walker, D. F. Ball and A. Fitter	1992
78	British Larks, Pipits and Wagtails	Eric Simms	1992
79	Caves and Cave Life	Philip Chapman	1993
80	Wild and Garden Plants	Max Walters	1993
81	Ladybirds	Mike Majerus	1994
82	The New Naturalists	Peter Marren	1995, 2005
83	The Natural History of Pollination	Michael Proctor, Peter Yeo and Andrew Lack	1996
84	Ireland	David Cabot	1999
85	Plant Disease	David Ingram and Noel Robertson	1999
86	Lichens	Oliver Gilbert	2000
87	Amphibians & Reptiles	Trevor Beebee and Richard Griffiths	2000
88	Loch Lomondside	John Mitchell	2001
89	The Broads	Brian Moss	200§
90	Moths	Mike Majerus	2002
91	Nature Conservation	Peter Marren	2002
92	Lakeland	Derek Ratcliffe	2002
93	British Bats	John Altringham	2003
94	A Natural History of the Seashore	Peter Hayward	2004
95	Northumberland	Angus Lunn	2004
96	Fungi	Brian Spooner and Peter Roberts	2005
97	Mosses and Liverworts	Ron Porley and Nick Hodgetts	2005
98	Bumblebees	Ted Benton	2006
99	Gower	Jonathan Mullard	2006
100	Woodlands	Oliver Rackham	2006
101	Galloway and the Borders	Derek Ratcliffe	2007
102	Garden Natural History	Stefan Buczacki	2007
103	The Isles of Scilly	Rosemary Parslow	2007
104	A History of Ornithology	Peter Bircham	2007
105	Wye Valley	George Peterken	2008
106	Dragonflies	Philip Corbet and Stephen Brooks	2008
107	Grouse	Adam Watson and Robert Moss	2008
108	Southern England	Peter Friend	2008
109	Islands	R. J. Berry	2009
110	Wildfowl	David Cabot	2009
111	Dartmoor	Ian Mercer	2009
112	Books and Naturalists	David Elliston Allen	2010
113	Bird Migration	Ian Newton	2010
114	Badger	Timothy J. Roper	2010
115	Climate and Weather	John Kington	2010
116	Plant Pests	David V. Alford	2011
117	Plant Galls	Margaret Redfern	2011
118	Marches	Andrew Allott	2011
119	Scotland	Peter Friend	2012
120	Grasshoppers and Crickets	Ted Benton	2012
121	Partridges: Countryside Barometer	G. R. Potts	2012
122	Vegetation of Britain and Ireland	Michael Proctor	2013
123	Terns	David Cabot and Ian Nisbet	2013
124	Bird Populations	Ian Newton	2013
125	Owls	Mike Toms	2014
126	Brecon Beacons	Jonathan Mullard	2014
127	Nature in Towns and Cities	David Goode	2014
128	Lakes, Loughs and Lochs	Brian Moss	2015
129	Alien Plants	Clive A. Stace and Michael J. Crawley	2015
130	Yorkshire Dales	John Lee	2015
131	Shallow Seas	Peter Hayward	2016
132	Falcons	Richard Sale	2016
133	Slugs and Snails	Robert Cameron	2016
134	Early Humans	Nicholas Ashton	2017
135	Farming and Birds	Ian Newton	2017
136	Beetles	Richard Jones	2018
137	Hedgehog	Pat Morris	2018
138	The Burren	David Cabot & Roger Goodwillie	2019
139	Gulls	John Coulson	2019
140	Garden Birds	Mike Toms	2019
141	Pembrokeshire	Jonathan Mullard	2020
142	Uplands and Birds	Ian Newton	2020
143	Ecology and Natural History	David M. Wilkinson	2021
144	Peak District	Penny Anderson	2021
145	Trees	Peter A Thomas	2022
146	Solitary Bees	Ted Benton, Nick Owens	2023
147	Shieldbugs	Richard Jones	2023
148	Ponds, Pools and Puddles	Jeremy Biggs & Penny Williams	2024
149	Stoats, Weasels, Martens and Polecats	Jenny MacPherson	2024
150	Exmoor	Flemming Ulf-Hansen	2025
151	Microworlds	David Wilkinson	2026

== Monographs ==
Number	Title	Author	Editions
M01	The Badger	Ernest Neal	1948
M02	The Redstart	John Buxton	1950
M03	The Wren	Edward A. Armstrong	1955
M04	The Yellow Wagtail	Stuart Smith	1950
M05	The Greenshank	Desmond Nethersole-Thompson	1951
M06	The Fulmar	James Fisher	1952
M07	Fleas, Flukes and Cuckoos	Miriam Rothschild and Theresa Clay	1952
M08	Ants	Derek Wragge Morley	1953
M09	The Herring Gull's World	Niko Tinbergen	1953
M10	Mumps, Measles and Mosaics	Kenneth M. Smith and Roy Markham	1954
M11	The Heron	Frank A. Lowe	1954
M12	Squirrels	Monica Shorten	1954
M13	The Rabbit	Harry V. Thompson and Alastair N. Worden	1956
M14	The Birds of the London Area Since 1900	London Natural History Society	1957
M15	The Hawfinch	Guy Mountfort	1957
M16	The Salmon	J. W. Jones	1959
M17	Lords and Ladies	Cecil T. Prime	1960
M18	Oysters	C. M. Yonge	1960
M19	The House Sparrow	J. D. Summers-Smith	1963, 1967
M20	The Wood Pigeon	R. K. Murton	1965
M21	The Trout	W. E. Frost and M. E. Brown	1967
M22	The Mole	Kenneth Mellanby	1971

== See also ==
- Category:New Naturalist writers
