= Steve Brooks (entomologist) =

British entomologist

Stephen John Brooks FRES (born 1955) is a British entomologist working at the Natural History Museum, London.

He attended the University of Newcastle-upon-Tyne, by whom he was awarded BSc in zoology (1976) and MSc in public health engineering (1977). In 1979, he was appointed Assistant Scientific Officer in the Department of Entomology at the Natural History Museum. He was subsequently promoted to Scientific Officer (1985), Higher Scientific Officer (1989), Senior Scientific Officer (1995), and to Research Entomologist (2001) in the Life Sciences Department (Insects).

His research interests include freshwater biology, palaeoecology, environmental change, Chironomidae (nonbiting midges) and Odonata (dragonflies and damselflies). The 2002 edition of his book Field Guide to the Dragonflies and Damselflies of Great Britain and Ireland was shortlisted for the Natural World Book Prize.

He is a member of the British Dragonfly Society (BDS), and has been editor of the BDS Journal and a member of the BDS Conservation Group.

== Bibliography ==
- 1994: Bulletin of the Natural History Museum: Entomology v.63. Intercept Ltd, Andover, UK. ISBN 978-1898298250
- 2000: Guidelines for Entomological Surveys. Amateur Entomologists' Society. ISBN 978-0900054648
- 2003: Dragonflies. Natural History Museum. ISBN 978-0565091804
- 2008: Dragonflies (with Philip Corbet). New Naturalist #108. Harper Collins. ISBN 978-0007151684 (HB) and ISBN 978-0007151691 (PB)
- 2014: Field Guide to the Dragonflies and Damselflies of Great Britain and Ireland (with Steve Cham and Richard Lewington (illustrator)). British Wildlife Publishing Ltd. ISBN 978-0956490285
