= Lewington =

Lewington is a surname. Notable people with the surname include:

- Alex Lewington (born 1991), English rugby union player
- Chris Lewington (born 1988), English footballer
- Clive Lewington (1920–1989), Australian Rules footballer
- Dean Lewington (born 1984), English footballer
- Lara Lewington (born 1979), British television presenter
- Nadine Lewington (born 1980), British actress
- Nancy Lewington, Canadian sprinter
- Peter Lewington (1950–2017) English cricketer
- Ray Lewington (born 1956), English footballer and manager
- Richard Lewington (born 1951), British artist
- Steven Lewington (born 1983), English professional wrestler
- Tyler Lewington (born 1994), Canadian ice hockey player
