= Reiner Grundmann =

German sociologist

- Born: 29 September 1955 (age 71); Freudenstadt, West Germany
- Education: Free University Berlin
- Scientific career
- Fields: Sociology; Science and Technology Studies; Social theory; Sustainability
- Workplaces: University of Nottingham; Aston University
- Thesis: Marxism and Ecology (1991)
- Doctoral advisor: Steven Lukes (doctorate); Peter Weingart (habilitation)
- Website: nottingham.academia.edu/ReinerGrundmann

Reiner Grundmann (born 29 September 1955 near Freudenstadt), is Professor of Science and Technology Studies (STS) at the University of Nottingham and Director of its interdisciplinary STS Research Priority Group. He is a German sociologist and political scientist who has resided in the UK since 1997. Previous appointments include Aston University and the Max Planck Institute for the Study of Societies.

== Life and academic career ==
Grundmann took his A-levels at Schelztor Gymnasium in Esslingen. He studied sociology in Berlin and received his doctorate 1989 at the European University Institute (EUI), Florence (Italy). His habilitation about environmental policy on the ozone layer challenge took place at Bielefeld University in 1998 under the auspices of Peter Weingart from the Center for Interdisciplinary Research, Bielefeld. Grundmann held post-doctoral positions, at the Wissenschaftszentrum Berlin, at the Graduate college Risk and private law at the University of Bremen, and at the Max Planck Institute for the Study of Societies, Cologne. In 1997 he took up a position at Aston University and is since 2012 at the University of Nottingham.

Grundmann's interest in the role of expertise in modern society is influenced by frameworks such as Post-normal science and Roger Pielke Jr.'s Honest broker. Both are in line with basic works in the sociology of science and technology doubting a direct influence of "certain knowledge" or "settled science" on political decision making, which is being discussed as the linear model of science policy interaction. His work challenges widespread believes in global success or failure of environmental policy as result of scientific consensus, or as an outcome of corporate power. In contrast, he shows the relevance of transnational policy networks.

== Social theory ==
=== Marxist view on ecology ===
Grundmann started his academic career with an analysis of the legacy of Marx's theory for the understanding of environmental problems. This work was a direct product of his PhD research at the EUI in Florence, in the late 1980s under the supervision of Steven Lukes. Grundmann described ecology as being no longer confined to the realms of biology since the 1970s. The term, as it had been coined in the 1870s by Ernst Haeckel, a German biologist and monist, was about a branch of biology dealing with the interaction of organisms and their surroundings. The current use of the term started to put the interaction of pollution in a political context and was later to describe a political movement as well. The thesis was published by Oxford University Press in 1991 and a related article by Grundmann himself and an answer and review of the study by Ted Benton appeared the following year in the New Left Review. The basic approach used Hans Magnus Enzensberger's Zur Kritik der politischen Ökologie published in 1973 in the German Kursbuch It has been translated in English in Ted Benton's Greening of Marxism in the 1990s.

Grundmann saw orthodox Мarxist thinking being caught between Marx's disrespect for the idiocy of rural life and his belief in a resurrection of nature. He attempted to identify problems which could be still dealt with convincingly with Marx's thought and approach. Grundmann dealt in detail with Marx and Engels' discourse on the 'domination over nature', which he claims of being of value. Grundmanns explicit advocacy of the term is exemptional and his introduction into the topic has been quoted as late as 2010 by leading Chinese scholars as being wonderful. Grundmann avoided depicting the domination as being a precondition of destruction, but allowed for interpretations as mastery or stewardship. Grundmann's defence of 'mastery over nature' as a metaphor in ecologically informed socialism was however not in line with Ted Benton's interpretation of the domination term used by Marx. Benton was positive about Grundmann cutting through a lot of sloppy thinking in the 'ecocentric' camp. He furthermore acknowledged that Grundmann's interpretation of Marx view of our relation to nature is insofar specific compared to e.g. Francis Bacon and Nietzsche, since in Marx's view that 'man should make an impact on the world'. Such mastery, according to Grundmann, would be better interpreted as in mastering a musical instrument. Grundmann concluded "that the pursuit of productivity and the development of a healthy environment need not be mutually exclusive," arguing that only specific technologies, not technology as such, lead to environmental degradation.

Whilst the book received some praise and critical attention at the time, it was published at a difficult historical juncture—after the fall of communism there was little enthusiasm for theoretical frameworks inspired by Marx. This has changed, and the forthcoming Chinese translation and recent reviews and papers about Grundmann's Marxist ecology published in China indicate an ongoing interest in the topic.

=== Sustainability and Werner Sombart ===
In the years that followed, he moved away from social theory and started engaging with issues about environmental sustainability from the viewpoint of science and technology studies. This move was inspired by the insight of Karl Marx that technology reveals the active transformation of nature, performed by humans and their social forms of organization.

A partial return to social theory was prompted by the co-operation with Nico Stehr with whom Grundmann worked since the late 1990s. Their common work on Werner Sombart led to a re-evaluation of the legacy of this pioneering German sociologist, examining in particular his low salience in the postwar period. Reviewer Lutz Kaelber from the University of Vermont referred to Stehrs and Grundmanns edition of Werner Sombart's Economic Life in the Modern Age as a valuable and accessible addition to the Anglo-American literature on Werner Sombart.

=== Sustainability and large technical systems ===
The study of science and technology related issues led him to research large technical systems, which he did during his time at the Social Science Research Center Berlin (WZB) in the early 1990s. His special interest was focused on the future of automobility. In the mid-1990s he spent three years at the Max Planck Institute for the Study of Societies in Cologne where he studied the efforts to protect the ozone layer (see as well ozone depletion and global warming). Transnational environmental policy - reconstructing Ozone was published in German in 1999 and in 2001 in English. It challenged widespread historical accounts which tend to explain the policies either as a result of scientific consensus, or as an outcome of corporate power. In contrast, it shows the relevance of transnational policy networks. The successful Montreal Protocol is often taken as an exemplar case which serves as the model for an (so far elusive) climate treaty. Grundmann claims that several problematic lessons have been drawn from this case. The book entry quotes Jim Lovelock stating This readable book is the best treatment of the subject published so far and F.Sherwood Rowland with Stimulating and thought-provoking.

== Science and technology Studies ==
Grundmann contributed to Science, technology and society (STS) with books about the role of experts and the power of scientific knowledge. He sees a role of science as agenda setter in the political process but stays in line with basic STS assumptions about the failure of the linear model of science and policy interaction. Roger Pielke's Honest Broker assumed with regard to climate studies, that the linear model still is overwhelmingly persistent. The assumption, that STS studies critical of the linear model would automatically translate into practice would echo the very linear model under scrutiny, In a contribution to a volume in Knowledge and Democracy in 2015 Grundmann stated that those previous scholarly critiques already converted into governments attempting to improve management of public expectations on technological risk assessments.

=== Role of Experts ===
In their book on expert knowledge (English translation in 2011: Experts: The knowledge and power of expertise), Grundmann and Stehr develop a specific concept of expertise. Contrary to common definitions that stress the centrality of scientists as experts, expertise is defined as mediating between knowledge production and knowledge application. With the expansion of knowledge intensive professions, ever more persons move into positions of experts—for some issues, some of the time. The rise of the knowledge society leads to a proliferation of knowledge sources which has not been sufficiently acknowledged by some dominant theories of expertise. A review in the Canadian Journal of Sociology pointed out that the book was published as part of Routledge's "Key Ideas" series and was among the best books in this series, which attempt to both critically review the field and present arguments that reach beyond existing works.

Experts: The knowledge and power of expertise got positive reviews e.g. in socialnet.de. Perlentaucher mentioned e.g. a positive review of Alexander Kissler in Süddeutsche Zeitung, stating Stehr and Grundmann would have successfully started to plough a new field. Climate change is a prominent current case which highlights the question about knowledge and decision making. Grundmann thinks that there exists a mistaken belief that the presence of a scientific consensus will enable ambitious climate policies. He considers that a much praised study overstates the case for scientific consensus. Grundmann is in line with main STS scholars view that science hardly determines policy outcomes. Examples such acid rain, smoking regulations, ozone depleting substances, genetically modified foods show how cultural, economic and political issues exercised a strong influence. Conversely, the presence of an international science consensus (through the IPCC) has led to different national policies, none of which is on track to achieving the reduction of greenhouse gas emissions that the IPCC Summary for Policymakers postulate as necessary.

=== Climate change ===
He wrote about the legacy of the Climatic Research Unit email controversy and whether it revitalized or undermined climate science and climate policy. His own experiences with peer review of another paper about the issue are described in an interview with Hans von Storch on Storch's Klimazwiebel blog. According von Storch's intro, Grundmann's paper Climategate and The Scientific Ethos faced severe resistance from social science journals before it was published in Science, Technology, & Human Values.

Grundmann and Stehr had themselves a controversy in the peer-reviewed literature, when they clashed with Constance Lever-Tracy about the role of sociology in climate affairs. Grundmann stated a politicization of climate science which makes science, technology and society (STS) scholars feel uncomfortable with the topic of climate change. Grundmann identifies a problematic approach of climate scientists who believe to have a prerogative to make political suggestions in the field "which society at large should take up because scientists always know best" combined with a basic lack of actual feasible solution proposals. He sees climate change as a long term issue requiring more public involvement and debate, not less and asks social scientists to study the interaction between climate and society, Lever-Tracy was more about letting the climatologists having the lead.

Mike Hulme noted that Grundmann (2007) pointed out some of the problems, with the circulation of IPCC knowledge or that he suggested that improvements need to be made, for example in form of improved communication. Grundmann wrote that besides the IPCC knowledge, it resulted in inaction in the United States, and that political agenda and high visibility of sceptical scientists in the media based on 'balanced reporting' led to a bias in climate change coverage in advantage of sceptical arguments. In Germany instead, science messaging and warnings from well known scientists prevailed and resulted in climate action.

== Publications and books ==
- (1991) Marxism and Ecology. Oxford: Oxford University Press. ISBN 0198273142
  - Korean (Dongnyok, Seoul 1995), Chinese translation is forthcoming
- (1999) Transnationale Umweltpolitik zum Schutz der Ozonschicht. USA und Deutschland im Vergleich. Frankfurt a.M.: Campus. ISBN 3-593-36222-8
  - (2001) Transnational Environmental Policy: Reconstructing Ozone. London: Routledge. ISBN 0415224233
- (2001) Werner Sombart. Economic Life in the Modern Age, edited and introduced by Nico Stehr and Reiner Grundmann, New Brunswick, N.J.; Oxford: Transaction Books. ISBN 0765800306.
- (2011) Die Macht der Erkenntnis. Berlin: Suhrkamp. ISBN 978-3-518-29590-8 (with Nico Stehr).
  - In English (2012) The Power of Scientific Knowledge. From Research to Public Policy. Cambridge: Cambridge University Press. ISBN 978-1-107022-72-0 (with Nico Stehr).
  - In Russian: Власть научного знания, Aletheia Publishers, Sankt Petersburg, ISBN 978-5-9905769-3-3.
- (2010) Expertenwissen: Die Kultur und die Macht von Experten, Beratern und Ratgebern. Frankfurt am Main: Velbrueck. ISBN 978-3-938808-82-5 (with Nico Stehr).
  - In English: Experts: The knowledge and power of expertise. London: Routledge. ISBN 978-0-415-60803-9 (with Nico Stehr).
- (2008) Society: Critical Concepts (4 vols.) London: Routledge. ISBN 0415426561 (edited with Nico Stehr).
- (2005) Knowledge: Critical Concepts (5 vols). London: Routledge. ISBN 0415317363 (edited with Nico Stehr).
