= Richenda C. Scott =

English Quaker historian (1903–1984)

Richenda Clara Scott Ph.D. (London) (née Payne) (1903 – 24 December 1984) was an English Quaker, historian and biographer, who published on Quaker history and also on English economic history and the economic consequences of colonialism.

== Background ==
Richenda Payne was born into a Quaker family, the sister of Janet Payne Whitney (1894–1974) who was later in Pennsylvania.; she was the daughter of William Payne, a dentist, of Chesham House, Brand Street, Hitchin. William Payne stood in 1930 as a Labour Party candidate for the Hitchin Urban Council, and was on the Council in 1934.

Her mother, a magistrate, had an entry in the 1934 Women's Who's Who, and was a daughter of Councillor John Turner. Her given names in a newspaper report of her 1888 marriage were Alice Elizabeth Emery (but the third name may have been Amery, given a death notice that calls her Elizabeth Amery).

Janet Payne, known as a biographer of Elizabeth Fry, was educated at The Mount School, York and studied at Bedford College, London. In 1914 she was involved in Quaker promotion of the study of The Feminist Movement by Ethel Snowden. She married in 1917 George Gillett Whitney, son of Willis Norton Whitney and his wife Mary Caroline Braithwaite, third daughter of Joseph Bevan Braithwaite and granddaughter of Joseph Ashby Gillett. A brother, Ralph Richard Bedford Payne, later a dentist at Chalfont St Peter, was married in 1917 at Howgills to Elsye May Wolfe, in the short interval between Janet's marriage and her departure to the United States with her husband.

The second volume of the History of Hitchin written by Reginald Hine mentioned William and Alice Payne as supporters of the Adult School founded by James Hack Tuke and William Whyte; and New Continents (1926) written by Richenda Payne for the Friends’ Foreign Mission Association.

== Activism ==
In the mid-1920s Richenda Payne attended London meetings of Young Friends. In 1928 she was a conference organiser with Howard Diamond (1898–1974).

At the beginning of 1929, Payne was engaged to Reginald Reynolds. At the time she was in Germany. She was International Secretary of the Young Friends, and editor of the publication Quaker World Service. In 1930 she was on the executive committee of the Friends of India Society, promoting Indian independence as a rival to the India League, in which Reynolds was also involved as a founder; Laurence Housman was president, Bertha Bracey was on the executive committee as was also Bisheshwar Prasad Sinda, and Atma S. Kamlani was a founder and secretary with Reynolds. It was formed when Reynolds returned from India where he had met Gandhi.

In 1933, alongside Roger Cowan Wilson, Payne contributed on "Quest for Justice, Peace and Goodwill in Social and Industrial Affairs" to the October issue of The Friend.

== Economics ==
Richenda Payne held a B.Sc. (Econ.) degree by 1937 when she registered as a doctoral student at the London School of Economics with Eileen Power. She contributed to the publication of The Economic and Social Foundations of European Civilization, the English translation of a work by Alfons Dopsch that appeared in 1937; and to statistics for The Politics of Democratic Socialism: An Essay on Social Policy (1940) by Evan Durbin. She was granted a Ph.D. in 1940 for a dissertation on "Agrarian conditions on the Wiltshire estates of the duchy of Lancaster". She had acted as personal secretary and research assistant to Power, and held LSE's Hutchinson Medal in 1939–1940.

== Historian of the Society of Friends ==
Scott's 1959 Friends Historical Society presidential address "Authority or Experience" is available online. It addressed points in the historiography of Victorian Quakerism in England. She discussed the life of John Wilhelm Rowntree and its importance. Looking at London Yearly meeting from 1860 to 1880, she mentioned a dominant "rigid control"; some "quietist" traditional Friends; and the Fritchley General Meeting splinter. She contrasted those with the Manchester Friends Institute group that coalesced around the radical David Duncan (1839–1872), in opposition to the evangelical trend. In her analysis she was developing an argument of Rowntree based on the views of Thomas Henry Speakman.

In 1964 Scott gave the Swarthmore Lecture on "Tradition and Experience". In book form, it was reviewed by Douglas V. Steere.

Quakers in Russia by Scott, also from 1964, is cited as being foundational, for example in McFadden et al 2004.

An obituary notice said:

Richenda C. Scott was a member of the committee of the Friends Historical Society from 1945 until her death. Early on she made a considerable contribution to the history of medieval agriculture and her presidential address to the Friends' Historical Society in 1959 entitled "Authority or experience: John Wilhelm Rowntree and the dilemma of nineteenth century British Quakerism" was a pioneering contribution to work on the Quaker renaissance the fruits of which are further presented in this number of the Journal.

== Published works ==
Scott's doctoral thesis was Agrarian conditions on the Wiltshire estates of the Duchy of Lancaster, the Lords Hungerford and the bishopric of Winchester in the 13th, 14th and 15th centuries (1939). Richenda Clara Payne was awarded a PhD by the London School of Economics. Other works included:

- Mysticism East and West: A Comparative Analysis of the Nature of Mysticism (1932) by Rudolf Otto; Payne was translator with Bertha C. Bracey.
- The Native Economy of Nigeria (1946), vol. I, second part on cash crops and livestock by her, the first part by Daryll Forde edited by Margery Perham
- Snowdonia: The National Park of North Wales (1949) with Frederick John North and Bruce Campbell. This was part of the New Naturalist series. A review by William Arthur Sledge said "Dr. Richenda Scott writes on the archaeology and history of the area, touching on many points concerning past social and economic developments and how they have helped to shape the rural life of to-day."
- Memoir of Reginald Hine, a family friend, in Relics of an Un-common Attorney (1951)
- Elizabeth Cadbury 1858–1951 (Harrap, 1955), biography of Elizabeth Cadbury
- In A History of Wiltshire vol. IV (1959) edited by Elizabeth Crittall, section on the agriculture of medieval Wiltshire. She had written a version "Economic history of medieval Wiltshire" (1948) of her dissertation.
- Tradition and Experience, Swarthmore Lecture 1964. A reply to Honest to God (1963).
- Quakers in Russia (1964). Scott corresponded in the early stages of this book with Henry Cadbury.
- Herbert G. Wood: A Memoir of His Life and Thought (1967), biography of H. G. Wood. A review by Henry Cadbury stated that Scott had known him since 1923.
- A Quaker Interpretation of Experience (1968), pamphlet.
- Die Quäker (1974), editor

== Personal life ==
Payne married Peter Scott in 1938; they had first met in the context of Young Friends in London during the 1920s. In December of that year Reginald Reynolds, to whom Payne had been engaged, married Ethel Mannin as her second husband.

Peter and Richenda Scott were both tutors for the summer term 1939 at Pendle Hill Quaker Center, Wallingford, Pennsylvania. The couple had travelled to the United States with Richenda's sister Janet Whitney; Richenda stayed for a time with the Whitneys at Westtown Township. Then the couple made a tour of Civilian Conservation Corps and Works Progress Administration camps.

The couple settled in Wales. Richenda's address in 1950 was Court Perrott, Llandegveth. In the 1950s the Scotts took part in the Bangor Quaker Meeting. At this period Peter Scott was working at Malltraeth on Anglesey. The couple took over and restored Llanidan Hall near Brynsiencyn. In later life the couple's address was Tre Anna, Dwyran.

Peter Scott died in 1972. In 1974, Scott helped Edward H. Milligan sort her late sister Janet's papers.
