= E. B. Ford =

British ecological geneticist (1901–1988)

Edmund Brisco "Henry" Ford FRS FRCP
- Born: Edmund Brisco Ford; 23 April 1901; Dalton-in-Furness, Lancashire, England
- Died: 2 January 1988 (aged 86); Oxford, Oxfordshire, England
- Education: St Bees School, Cumberland, England; University of Oxford, Wadham College
- Awards: Darwin Medal; Weldon Memorial Prize (1959)
- Scientific career
- Fields: Ecological genetics
- Workplaces: All Souls College, Oxford; University of Oxford

Edmund Brisco "Henry" Ford FRS FRCP (23 April 1901 – 2 January 1988) was a British ecological geneticist. He was a leader among those British biologists who investigated the role of natural selection in nature. As a schoolboy Ford became interested in lepidoptera, the group of insects which includes butterflies and moths. He went on to study the genetics of natural populations, and invented the field of ecological genetics. Ford was awarded the Royal Society's Darwin Medal in 1954. In the wider world his best known work is Butterflies (1945). Ford was a member of the UK Eugenics Society, of which he was a council member in 1933-1934, also contributing to its publications.

== Education ==
Ford was born in Dalton-in-Furness, near Ulverston, in Lancashire, England, on 23 April 1901. He was the only child of Harold Dodsworth Ford (1864–1943), a classics teacher turned Anglican clergyman, and his wife (and second cousin) Gertrude Emma Bennett. His paternal grandfather, Dr Henry Edmund Ford (1821–1909), was a professor of music at Carlisle and the organist of Carlisle Cathedral from 1842 to 1902. Ford was educated at St Bees School, Cumberland (now Cumbria), and read zoology at Wadham College, Oxford, (where his father had also studied), graduating B.A. in 1924, upgraded to M.A. 1927, B.Sc. (a research degree) in 1927, and taking a D.Sc in 1943.

== Career and research ==
Ford's career was based entirely at the University of Oxford. The biologist Arthur Cain said Ford took a degree in classics before turning to zoology. Ford read zoology at Oxford, and was taught genetics by Julian Huxley. "The lecturer whose interests most closely reflected mine was Julian Huxley. I owe him a great debt, especially for inspiration... Even though Huxley was... only at Oxford from 1919 to 1925, he was the most powerful voice in developing the selectionist attitude there... I met Ray Lankester through E.B. Poulton. He was already an old man... but talked to me a good deal of Charles Darwin and Pasteur, both of whom he knew."

Ford was appointed University Demonstrator in Zoology in 1927 and Lecturer at University College, Oxford, in 1933. Specialising in genetics, he was appointed University Reader in Genetics in 1939 and was the Director of the Genetics Laboratory, 1952–1969, and Professor of Ecological Genetics 1963–1969. Ford was one of the first scientists to be elected a Fellow of All Souls College since the seventeenth century. He was among those opposed to the admission of women fellows beginning in 1981; once, upon encountering one such, he swung his umbrella at her and shouted "Out of my way, henbird!".

Ford had a long working relationship with R.A. Fisher. By the time Ford had developed his formal definition of genetic polymorphism, Fisher had got accustomed to high selection values in nature. He was most impressed by the fact that polymorphism concealed powerful selective forces (Ford gave human blood groups as an example). Like Fisher, he continued the natural selection versus genetic drift debate with Sewall Wright, whom Ford believed put too much emphasis on genetic drift. It was as a result of Ford's work, as well as his own, that Dobzhansky changed the emphasis in the third edition of his famous text from drift to selection.

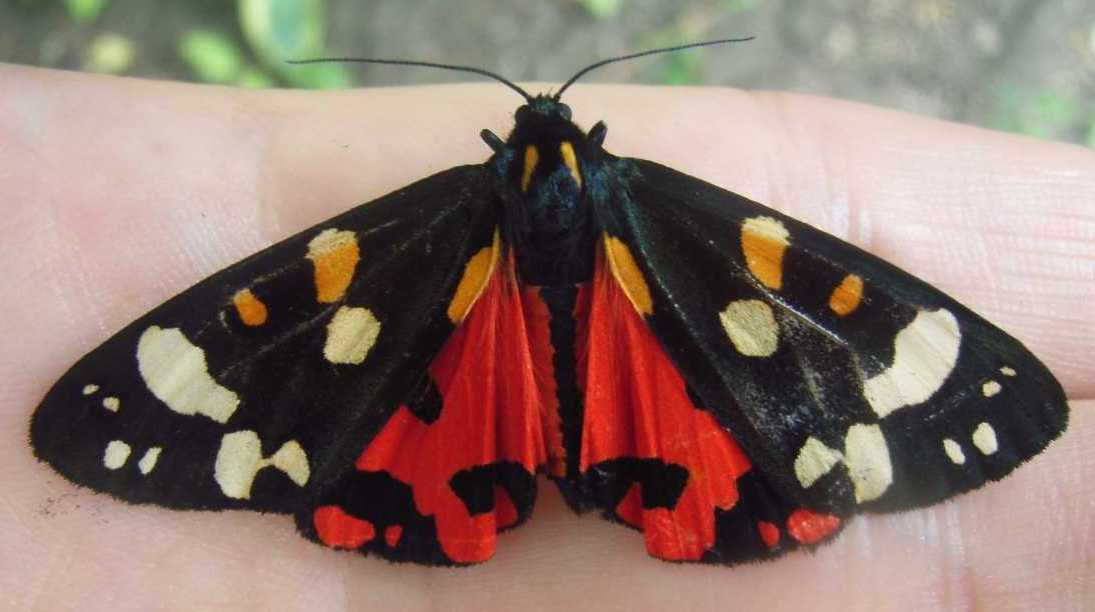
Callimorpha dominula morpha typica with spread wings. Polymorphism in this species was investigated by Ford for many years. The red with black rear wings, revealed in flight, warn of its noxious taste. The front wings are cryptic, covering the rear wings at rest. Here the moth, on a human hand, is resting but alert, and has jinked the front wings forward to reveal the warning flash.

Ford was an experimental naturalist who wanted to test evolution in nature. He virtually invented the field of research known as ecological genetics. His work on the wild populations of butterflies and moths was the first to show that the predictions made by R.A. Fisher were correct. He was the first to describe and define genetic polymorphism, and predicted that human blood group polymorphisms might be maintained in the population by providing some protection against disease. Six years after this prediction it was found to be so, and furthermore, heterozygous advantage was decisively established by a study of AB x AB crosses. His magnum opus was Ecological Genetics, which ran to four editions and was widely influential. He laid much of the groundwork for subsequent studies in this field, and was invited as a consultant to help set up similar research groups in several other countries.

Amongst Ford's many publications, perhaps the most popularly successful was the first book in the New Naturalist series, Butterflies. Ford also went on in 1955 to write Moths in the same series, one of only a few to have authored more than one book in the series.

Ford became Professor, and then Emeritus Professor of Ecological Genetics, University of Oxford. He was a Fellow of All Souls College, and Honorary Fellow of Wadham College. He was elected FRS in 1946, and awarded the Darwin Medal in 1954.

=== Ecological genetics ===
E.B. Ford worked for many years on genetic polymorphism. Polymorphism in natural populations is frequent; the key feature is the occurrence together of two or more discontinuous forms of a species in some kind of balance. So long as the proportions of each form is above mutation rate, then selection must be the cause. As early as 1930 Fisher had discussed a situation where, with alleles at a single locus, the heterozygote is more viable than either homozygote. That is a typical genetic mechanism for causing this type of polymorphism. The work involves a synthesis of field observations, taxonomy, and laboratory genetics.

=== Melanism in the peppered moth ===
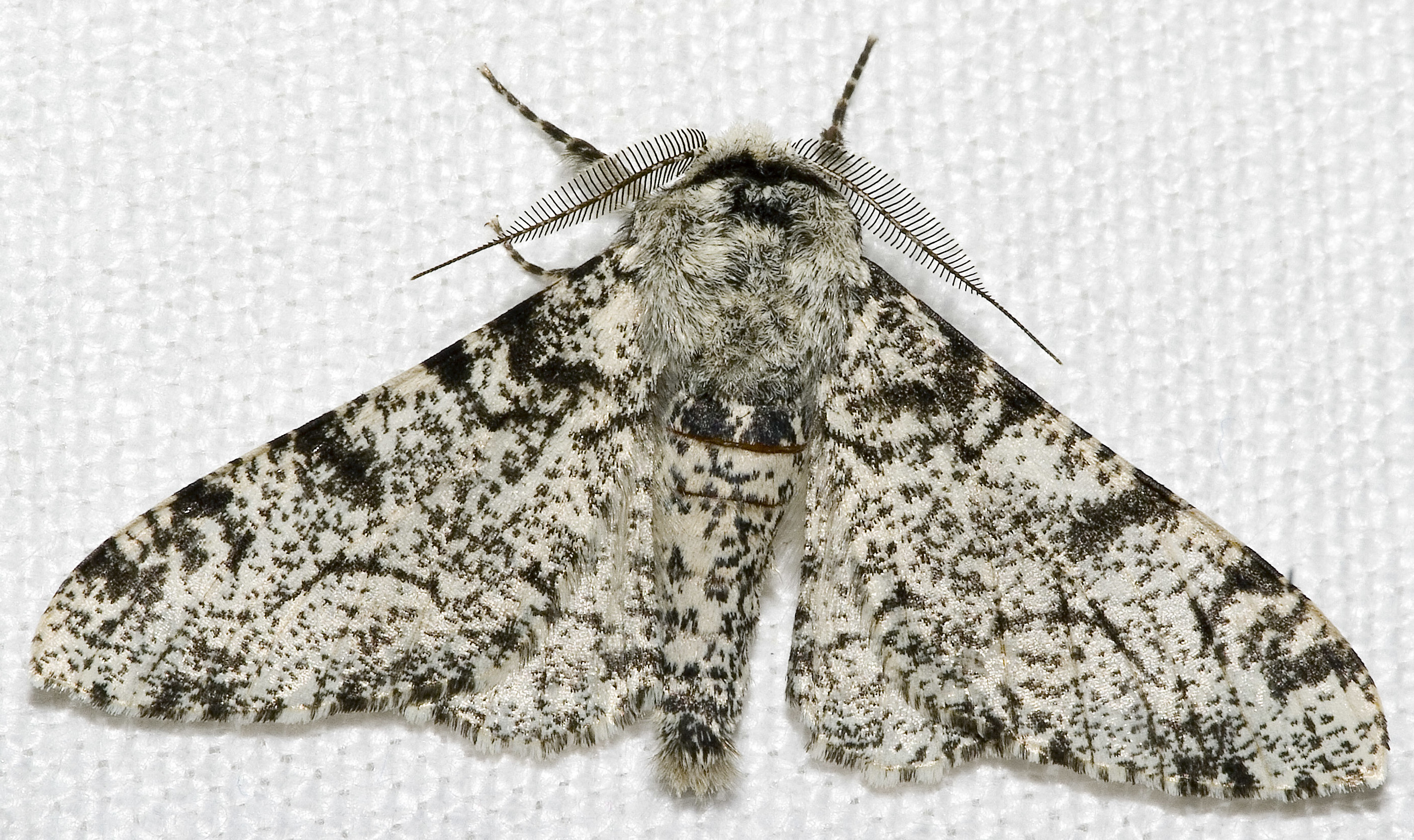
Biston betularia f. typica is the white-bodied form of the peppered moth.

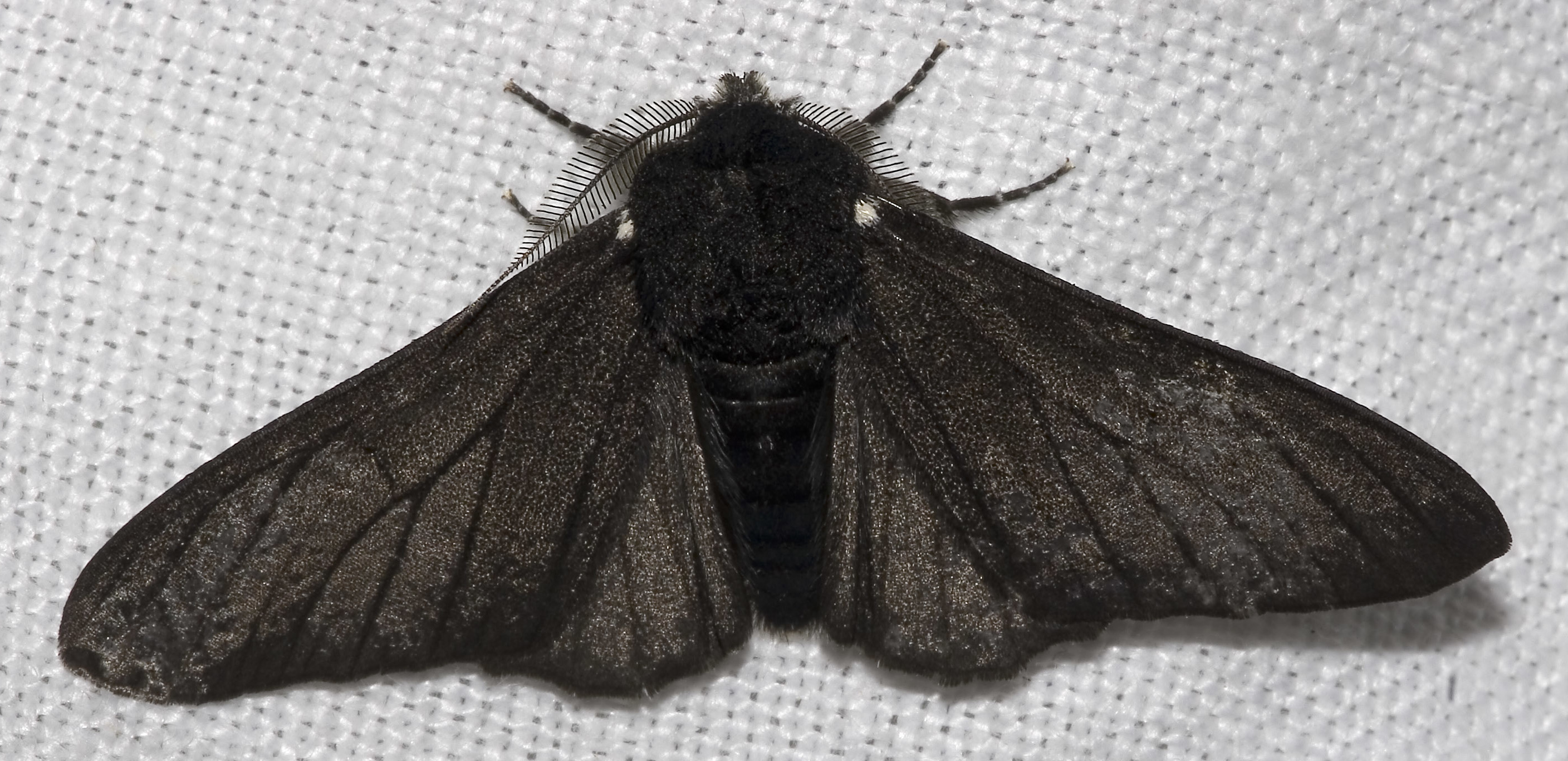
Biston betularia f. carbonaria is the black-bodied form of the peppered moth.

Ford was the supervisor of Bernard Kettlewell during Kettlewell's famous experiments on the evolution of melanism in the peppered moth, Biston betularia.

The entomologist Michael Majerus discussed criticisms that had been made of Kettlewell's experimental methods in his 1998 book Melanism: Evolution in Action. This book was misrepresented in reviews, and the story was picked up by creationist campaigners. In her controversial book Of Moths and Men, Judith Hooper (2002) gave a critical account of Ford's supervision and relationship with Kettlewell, and implied that the work was fraudulent or at least incompetent. Careful studies of Kettlewell's surviving papers by Rudge (2005) and Young (2004) found Hooper's suggestion of fraud to be unjustified, and that "Hooper does not provide one shred of evidence to support this serious allegation". Majerus himself described Of Moths and Men as "littered with errors, misrepresentations, misinterpretations and falsehoods". He concludes

"If you wade through the 200+ papers written about melanism in the peppered moth, it is difficult to come to any conclusion other than that natural selection through the agent of differential bird predation is largely responsible for the rise and fall of carbonaria".

Kettlewell and Helen Spurway, then the graduate student (and later the wife) of J.B.S. Haldane, were known to have shocked Ford by catching live moths as they flitted around a light, popping them in their mouths, and eating them whole. Haldane, who did not like Ford, was of the opinion that Ford and Kettlewell had attempted to capitalise on the supposed evolutionary adaptation of the main two variants of the peppered moth, for which Haldane, as early as 1924, had predicted the statistical probability of rate of change from light to melanic forms as an example of classic Mendelian genetics. In 1961, Haldane and Spurway talked to Canadian lepidopterist Gary Botting about the peppered moth and the unlikelihood of Ford and Kettlewell obtaining results that approximated Haldane's 1924 statistical calculations so closely, but the reasoning behind this view is far from clear. Botting already regarded the case of the peppered moth as tantamount to belief in Lamarckian evolution, and was of the opinion that some genetic mechanism other than bird predation was at work.

=== Bibliography ===
- Ackery, Phillip; Vane-Wright, Richard, eds. (1984). The Biology of Butterflies. Royal Entomological Society of London. ISBN 978-0-12-713750-6.
- Clarke B 1995. Edmund Brisco Ford. Biographical Memoirs of Fellows of the Royal Society of London.
- Creed, Robert; Ford, Edmund Brisco (1971). Ecological Genetics and Evolution: Essays in Honour of E. B. Ford. Blackwell Scientific Publications. ISBN 978-0-632-08360-2.
- Hooper, Judith (2002). Of Moths and Men: An Evolutionary Tale: The Untold Story of Science and the Peppered Moth. Fourth Estate. ISBN 978-1-84115-392-6.
- Huxley, Julian (1954). "Morphism and evolution". Heredity. 9: 1–52. Bibcode:1955Hered...9....1H. doi:10.1038/hdy.1955.1.
- Kettlewell, Bernard (1973). The Evolution of Melanism: The Study of a Recurring Necessity; with Special Reference to Industrial Melanism in the Lepidoptera. Clarendon Press. ISBN 978-0-19-857370-8. (jointly dedicated to Ford and the Nuffield Foundation)
- Marren, Peter (1995). The New Naturalists. London: HarperCollins.
- Teän, Isles of Scilly: the site of Ford's Common Blue (Polyommatus icarus) population study.

=== Works by Ford ===
- Ford E.B. (1931, 8th ed 1965). Mendelism and evolution. Methuen, London.
- Carpenter, G.D. Hale and E.B. Ford (1933) Mimicry. Methuen, London.
- Ford E.B. (1938, 2nd ed 1950). The study of heredity. Butterworth, London. 2nd edn: Oxford University Press.
- Ford E.B. (1940). Polymorphism and taxonomy. In Huxley J. The new systematics. Oxford.
- Ford E.B. (1942, 7th edn 1973). Genetics for medical students Chapman and Hall, London.
- Ford E.B. (1945, 3rd edn 1977). Butterflies. New Naturalist No. 1 Collins, London.
- Ford E.B. (1951). British butterflies. Penguin Books, London.
- Ford E.B. (1954, 3rd edn 1972). Moths. New Naturalist No. 30 Collins, London.
- Ford E.B. (1964, 4th edn 1975). Ecological genetics. Chapman and Hall, London.
- Ford E.B. (1965). Genetic polymorphism. All Souls Studies, Faber & Faber, London.
- Ford E.B. (1976). Genetics and adaptation. Institute of Biology studies, Edward Arnold, London.
- Ford E.B. (1979). Understanding genetics. Faber and Faber, London.
- Ford E.B. (1980). Some recollections pertaining to the evolutionary synthesis. In Mayr E. and Provine W.B. (eds) The evolutionary synthesis: perspectives on the unification of biology. Harvard 1980; 1998. [effectively, this is an intellectual autobiography]
- Ford E.B. (1981). Taking genetics into the countryside. Weidenfeld & Nicolson, London.
- Ford E.B. and J.S. Haywood (1984). Church treasures of the Oxford district. Alan Sutton, Gloucester.

== Personal life ==
Ford never married, had no children, and was considered decidedly eccentric, although his eccentricity was said to be more prominent when he knew he had an audience; he was also fond of slightly surrealist practical joking. He could be markedly generous to his friends: it was "an open secret" that he made a handsome contribution to the grant of £350000 given by the Nuffield Foundation for the establishment of a Unit of Medical Genetics at the University of Liverpool; this greatly boosted the research of Cyril Clarke and Philip Sheppard.

Professor Ford would come into first year biology lectures at Oxford University – which were quite large, with about 150 students, and address the mixed group “good morning gentlemen”, ignoring the ladies, who even at that time were maybe 30% of student numbers – they are now 48%. The students thought that was amusing, and decided that, for one lecture in 1965, no men would attend. So he walked in to the lecture theatre with about 50 women sitting there waiting attentively, but no men. He put his notes on the lectern and looked up. “Oh dear, nobody here today I see, might as well go home”! Picked up his notes and walked out..

Non-academic information on his life is hard to come by, mostly consisting of scattered remarks made by colleagues. He campaigned strenuously against the admission of female Fellows to All Souls College. Miriam Rothschild, an outstanding zoologist, was one of the few women with whom Ford was on good terms. Rothschild and Ford campaigned for the legalisation of male homosexuality in Britain. Ford was on good terms with Theodosius Dobzhansky, who did ground-breaking work on ecological genetics with Drosophila species: they exchanged letters and visits. Within the Department of Zoology at Oxford were a number of colleagues such as Arthur Cain with similar interests in investigating the role of natural selection; but Ford avoided the departmental teatime discussions and indeed most scientific discussion with these colleagues other than via the printed word.

Bryan Clarke wrote Ford's obituary in the Biographical Memoirs of Fellows of the Royal Society, but there are few other sources on his life.
