= TJR =

TJR may refer to:

- TJR (DJ) (born 1983), American DJ
- Total joint replacement, or replacement arthroplasty, an orthopedic surgery procedure.
- The Jester Race, an album by melodic death metal band In Flames
- T. J. Roberts (ornithologist), Pakistan wildlife authority
- The ISO code for the Tajikistani rouble

== See also ==
- Super Junior-T (슈퍼주니어-티), Korean boyband
- Junior technician
