= Frederick North =

Frederick North may refer to:

- Frederick North, Lord North (1732–1792), Prime Minister of Great Britain
- Frederick North, 5th Earl of Guilford (1766–1827), son of the above, politician
- Frederick North (MP) (1800–1869), MP for Hastings, kinsman of the above
- F. J. North (Frederick John North, 1889–1968), British geologist and museum curator
- Frederic North (1866–1921), Western Australian cricketer and civil servant
- Freddie North (born 1939), American singer
