= Arthur Cain =

British biologist (1921–1999)

Arthur James Cain FRS (25 July 1921 – 20 August 1999) was a British evolutionary biologist and ecologist. He was elected a Fellow of the Royal Society in 1989.

== Career ==
Arthur James Cain was born and grew up in Rugby in Warwickshire, England. In 1939 he was awarded a prestigious scholarship (Demyship) to Magdalen College, Oxford, where he graduated with first class honors in Zoology in 1941. Entering the British army in December 1941, Cain was commissioned second lieutenant in the Royal Army Ordnance Corps (engineering) and was later transferred to the Royal Electrical and Mechanical Engineers (R.E.M.E.) on its formation. He was promoted to captain in 1942.

After leaving the military in November 1945, Cain returned to Oxford to pursue research in the Department of Zoology. He became a Departmental Demonstrator in October 1946, finishing his D. Phil. in 1948. From January 1949 until 1964 Cain was employed as University Demonstrator in Animal Taxonomy. In addition he was appointed Curator of the Zoological Collections at the Oxford University Museum in 1954, besides serving as Lecturer in Zoology at St Peter's College (1958–1961).

In 1964, Cain left Oxford to become professor of zoology at the University of Manchester, and he later (1968) was appointed Derby Professor of Zoology at the University of Liverpool. He received emeritus status at Liverpool upon his retirement in 1989.

== Scientific activities ==
Cain's main interests lay in evolutionary biology, ecological genetics, animal taxonomy and speciation.

Though he initially conducted research with John Baker on the histochemistry of lipids, his main work lay in the field developed by E.B. Ford, namely, ecological genetics. With P.M. Sheppard, Cain studied the ecological genetics of colour and banding polymorphisms in snails. Cain and Sheppard's work on Cepaea nemoralis, one of the first studies to demonstrate natural selection by predators acting on a colour polymorphism, is now regarded as a classic. It generated a long series of further studies by Cain, including the formal genetic analysis of the variation, the discovery of area effects and the analysis of climatic influences. With John Currey he made elegant use of sub-fossil material to follow changes in time as well as space. Later he turned to the study of variation in shell shape.

In population genetics he clarified the concept of adaptive value. He made important contributions to the theory and practice of taxonomy, the problems of homology, phyletic weighting and taxonomic importance, on the status of the genus, and on the relevance of natural selection to our understanding of variation between taxonomic categories.

== Cain reminisces on pre-war Oxford ==
Towards the end of his life Cain was persuaded to reminisce about the status of natural selection in pre-war Oxford and how it changed over the years of the modern evolutionary synthesis. The general attitude was sceptical of natural selection. Charles Elton, who led the emergence of ecology as a discipline, pointed out the Arctic fox polymorphism, which can be found in all three tundra biomes of the northern palaeoarctic. Arctic foxes (Alopex lagopus) are dimorphic: the common morph ('white') is white in winter and brownish-grey dorsally in summer; the other morph ('blue') is light brown/blue in winter and dark brown in summer. The two morphs interbreed freely. Despite the obvious advantage of white in avoiding predation, blue is actually the most frequent morph in Iceland. Elton also gave a number of other examples which he claimed could not be explained by natural selection.

That very phenomenon which was to be used by Fisher & Ford in studies on natural selection is here shown by cogent argument and the facts of field natural history to be [apparently] inexplicable by selection. But Elton knew that a far greater range of other characters have the same implications, namely, all, or nearly all, the differences (non-polymorphic) between closely related species. Cain.

Also, Robson and Richards "showed a surprising reluctance to allow any example of natural selection; their cautious qualification that characters were non-adaptive as far as they could see became, too often, a certainty that they were non-adaptive; and their arguments were sometimes one-sided." Cain laid the blame on their "vitalistic or perhaps theistic attitudes... Robson and Richards were far from alone. Alister Hardy... was an earnest Unitarian and certainly a vitalist" (p7)... In Cambridge matters were even worse" (p8, giving as examples W.H. Thorpe, Charles Raven, Sir James Gray and J.W.S. Pringle).

What I wanted to know from all these great people was, how exactly did they know that a character was non-adaptive or neutral? They didn't know, and they couldn't know. Cain. This was the stimulus for Cain's research on evolution in natural communities.

David Lack was the only religious man I knew at that period who did not allow his religion to dictate his view of natural selection. Cain.

He might have added, had he known them, Ronald Fisher and Theodosius Dobzhansky, who were also believing Christians: Fisher from the start of his career was a leading proponent of natural selection.

In contrast to many others, E.B. Ford appreciated that, even if a character was in itself non-adaptive, the gene or genes determining it might affect other, adaptive, characters which were always under selective influence. Ford understood the significance of pleiotropism, and knew of Fisher's demonstration that a neutral gene derived from a single mutation could only be in about the same number of individuals as there had been generations since its inception. Also, as Cain's own research showed, much polymorphism is maintained by differential selection in the diversity of environments within a species' range.

== Notable publications ==
(a full bibliography listing 148 items appears as supplementary material to Bryan Clarke's obituary)

Cain A.J. 1954. Animal species and their evolution. Hutchinson, London.

Cain A.J. 1968. Studies on Cepaea V. Phil. Trans. R. Soc. B 253, 499–517.

Cain A.J. 1971. Colour and banding morphs in subfossil samples of the snail Cepaea. In Creed R. (ed) Ecological genetics and evolution. Blackwell, Oxford.

Cain A.J. 1977. The efficacy of natural selection in wild populations. In The changing scene in natural sciences. Special publication #12, 111–33. Academy of Natural Sciences.

Cain A.J. 1983. Ecology and ecogenetics of terrestrial molluscan populations. In Russell-Hunter W.D. (ed) The Mollusca vol 6, p597-647. Academic Press, N.Y.

Cain A.J. and Currey J.D. 1963a. Area effects in Cepaea. Phil Trans Roy Soc B 246, 269–299.

Cain A.J. and Currey J.D. 1963b. Area effects in Cepaea on the Larkhill Artillery Ranges, Salisbury Plain. J. Linnaean Soc London (Zoology) 45, 1–15.

Cain A.J. and Currey J.D. 1968. Ecogenetics of a population of Cepaea nemoralis subject to strong area effects. Phil Trans Roy Soc B 253, 447–482.

Cain A.J., King J.M.B. and Sheppard P.M. 1960. New data on the genetics of polymorphism in the snail Cepaea nemoralis. Genetics 45, 393–411.

Cain A.J. and Provine W.B. 1991. Genes and ecology in history. In Berry R.J. et al. (eds) Genes in ecology: the 33rd Symposium of the British Ecological Society. Blackwell, Oxford.

Cain A.J. and Sheppard P.M. 1950. Selection in the polymorphic land snail Cepaea nemoralis (L.). Heredity 4, 275–94.

Cain A.J. and Sheppard P.M. 1954. Natural selection in Cepaea. Genetics 39, 89–116.

Cain A.J., Sheppard P.M. and King J.M.B. 1968. Studies on Cepaea I. The genetics of some morphs and varieties of Cepaea nemoralis (L.). Phil. Trans. R. Soc. B 253, 383–396.

Clarke B.C. 1979. The evolution of genetic diversity. Proc Roy Soc B. 205, 453–474. [a general review]

Currey J.D. and Cain A.J. 1968. Climate and selection of banding morphs in Cepaea from the climate optimum to the present day. Phil. Trans. R. Soc. B 253, 483–98.
