= Ian Hepburn =

Ian Hepburn (29 May 1902 – 3 July 1974) was a British schoolmaster, botanist, ecologist and author.

== Early life and education ==
Hepburn was born in Kensington, London, in 1902. He had a sister, Elspeth. His family later moved to North Cornwall, onto the Rock in the estuary of the River Camel, where he developed a love of nature and the sea. He was educated at Gresham's School in Norfolk, where he earned a scholarship to Lincoln College, Oxford to study natural sciences.

== Career ==
After earning a degree from Lincoln College, Hepburn taught chemistry at Oundle School in Northamptonshire for nearly four decades, 1925–64. For much of his time there, he was a housemaster; latterly he was Second Master. He was elected Member of the Royal Archaeological Institute in 1950. He published papers on the vegetation of coastal Cornwall and Norfolk (places he had known from boyhood), and on that of Northamptonshire Jurassic limestone. He served on the Council of the British Ecological Society, and was active as a journal editor. He was a member of several natural history clubs and trusts in Northamptonshire and, later, Cambridgeshire.

He has been described as, "a modest man, courteous, patient, popular with students and staff". As well as being a devoted teacher, he loved music: the Hepburn Music Competition at Oundle was started by him (while Second Master) in the early 1950s, and is named after him.

He dedicated his book Flowers of the Coast to his wife Phyllis, "who loves the sea but is sometimes uncertain of her botany". An early review remarks, "This book, so clearly and unpretentiously written, so admirably illustrated, is imaginatively stimulating to a quite unusual degree. No fringe of beach or, scrubby headland, no strip of brackish marsh, no tidal estuary can seem, when one has read it, devoid of interest."

== Personal life ==
Hepburn married Phyllis Champ, daughter of the school's Director of Music, in 1947. He died suddenly at his home in Cambridge, age 72.

== Bibliography ==
- Hepburn, Ian (1952). Flowers of the Coast. London: Collins. ISBN 978-0002130677. New Naturalist #24.
