= Eric Simms (ornithologist) =

English ornithologist

Eric Arthur Simms DFC
- Born: 24 August 1921; London, England
- Died: 1 March 2009 (aged 87)
- Education: Latymer Upper School
- Alma mater: Merton College, Oxford
- Occupations: Ornithologist; Naturalist; Writer; Teacher; Sound recordist; Broadcaster; Conservationist; RAF pilot/ bomb-aimer

Eric Arthur Simms, DFC (24 August 1921 – 1 March 2009) was an English ornithologist, naturalist, writer, sound recordist, broadcaster and conservationist, as well as a decorated wartime Bomber Command pilot/ bomb-aimer.

Simms was born on 24 August 1921, the youngest of three brothers, in London, where his father Levi Simms from Cheshire was head gardener at the private gardens in Ladbroke Square. His mother Amy Margaret was the daughter of Henry Coles from Oxford.

He won a scholarship to Latymer Upper School and in 1939 began to read history at Merton College, Oxford, where he also took up bird ringing and joined the University Air Squadron, and, without completing his studies, was sent for aircrew training in Canada and the United States in 1941. He was called up, joining the Royal Air Force in 1941 and by 1943 was a Leading Aircraftman, and was then commissioned as a pilot officer on probation in the Royal Air Force Volunteer Reserve on 19 March 1943, serving as a bomb aimer and second pilot in Lancaster bombers, in which he flew 27 raids over Germany. On 14 November 1944 he was awarded Distinguished Flying Cross, the citation praising his "skill and determination which have been an inspiration to the crews with which he flies" and a "complete disregard for danger in the face of the heaviest enemy defences".

After demobilisation, he worked as a teacher in Warwickshire, and served on the research committee of the West Midland Bird Club.

He then worked for the BBC, initially as a wildlife sound recordist, before making more than 7,000 radio broadcasts and hundreds of television appearances. He was a passionate believer in bringing natural history to a wider audience, and was a resident naturalist at the BBC. He is credited with starting the Countryside radio programme in 1952. The theme tune used for the programme was Rivers of the North of England by Lambert Williamson. As a guest on Desert Island Discs in 1976, one of his eight choices was a recording of a blackbird he had made near his London home. He narrated the 1972 BBC LP "A Year's Journey" (catalogue number RED135M), which was subtitled "Wildlife recordings from the BBC TV Series for schools".

Simms also appeared in Sir John Betjeman's 1973 TV documentary Metro-land, about the Metropolitan Railway line running northwest out of London. He was featured birdwatching in Gladstone Park, near to his home in Dollis Hill.

In 1980 he and his wife Thelma (who was Section Officer Thelma Jackson, WAAF, when they married) retired to South Witham, near Grantham, Lincolnshire. He died on 1 March 2009. Thelma had died in 2001. They had a daughter and a son, Amanda and David, and four granddaughters.

== Bibliography ==
Simms was a prolific writer of over twenty books and numerous articles.

- —— (1952). Bird Migrants. Some aspects and observations. Cleaver-Hume Press.
- —— (1957). Voices of the Wild. Putnam.
- —— (1969). Witherby's Sound-Guide to British Birds (2 ed.). Witherby. (With Myles North)
- —— (1971). Woodland Birds. Collins. ISBN 0-00-213259-1. (New Naturalist series no.52)
- —— (1974). Wild Life in the Royal Parks. HMSO. ISBN 0-11-670573-6.
- —— (1975). Birds of Town and Suburb. Collins. ISBN 0-00-219126-1.
- —— (1976). Birds of the Air: The Autobiography of a Naturalist and Broadcaster. Hutchinson. ISBN 0-09-126070-1.
- —— (1976). The Public Life of the Street Pigeon. Hutchinson. ISBN 0-09-133150-1.
- —— (1978). British Thrushes. Collins. ISBN 0-00-219670-0. (New Naturalist series no.63)
- —— (1979). Birds of Town and Village. RSPB.
- —— (1979). A Natural History of Britain and Ireland. Dent. ISBN 0-460-04372-2.
- —— (1979). Wild Life Sounds and Their Recordings. Paul Elek. ISBN 0-236-40134-3.
- —— (1982). Natural History of Birds. Weidenfeld & Nicolson.
- —— (1983). A Natural History of British Birds. Dent. ISBN 0-460-04469-9.
- —— (1985). British Warblers. Collins. ISBN 0-00-219404-X. (New Naturalist series no.71)
- —— (1989). The Song Thrush. Shire Publications. ISBN 0-7478-0023-5.
- —— (1992). British Larks, Pipits and Wagtails. Collins. ISBN 0-00-219870-3. (New Naturalist series no.78)
