= William Roberts (agriculturist) =

Sir William Roberts (17 February 1884 – 1971) was a Welsh agricultural scientist, academic, and businessman known for his role in the development of the cotton industry in the Punjab region of British India and later Pakistan. A member of the Indian Agricultural Service, he served as a professor of agriculture and later founded British Cotton Growing Association and Robert Cotton Association.

== Early life and education ==
Roberts was born on 17 February 1884 into a farming family on Ynys Môn (Isle of Anglesey), Wales. He attended the University College of North Wales (now Bangor University) from 1902 to 1906, graduating with first-class honours in chemistry.

== Career ==
After completing his education, Roberts joined the Indian Agricultural Service. He was appointed the first Professor of Agriculture at the Punjab Agricultural College in Lyallpur (now the University of Agriculture, Faisalabad). During this period, he co-authored A Text Book of Punjab Agriculture, published by the Civil and Military Gazette, Lahore.

From 1934 to 1946, Roberts served as a member of the Punjab Legislative Assembly. He also served on the Japanese and United Kingdom Traders Committees in 1934 and 1938. He was knighted in 1938 in recognition of his services.

Roberts later shifted from academia to commercial agriculture and received acres of land from Punjab government on lease to expand cotton production in the region. He served as managing director of B.C.G.A. (Punjab) Ltd. and R.C.A. Ltd., based in Khanewal, West Pakistan. His business interests extended across Khanewal, Bahawalpur, and Sindh, where he owned ginning and pressing factories and oil mills. He was also a Director of SVOAI in Rahim Yar Khan.

His early commercial work focused on importing and testing cotton varieties suited to irrigated conditions in the Punjab. Through lease arrangements, he expanded cultivation using high-yielding varieties over large areas and became an exporter of cotton, linters, and cottonseed cake. After the partition of India, under Ayub Khan land reforms his landholdings were reduced to 590 acres, and he redirected his operations toward seed production and distribution, establishing what later became RCA Seed.

In 1957, Roberts established an agricultural research trust to fund postgraduate studies and support academic exchanges between Pakistan and Bangor.

After returning to North Wales, he served as Vice President of the University College of North Wales from 1961 to 1966 and remained a member of the School of Agriculture Committee until his death in 1971.

== Personal life ==
Roberts married the daughter of Thomas Jones in 1919. They had three children: two daughters and one son. His son, T. J. Roberts served as a general manager of B.C.G.A. (Punjab) Ltd.
