= J. Richard Harris =

Irish entomologist, fishing consultant, tackle merchant and author

John Richard Harris (1910–1994) was an Irish entomologist, fishing consultant, tackle merchant, and author.

Harris was a keen angler and tier of flies from boyhood. He was a sometime merchant seaman, journalist, and freshwater biologist. He was a demonstrator in limnology at Trinity College, Dublin. He was a director of Garnetts & Keegan's Ltd, Dublin, gunsmiths and suppliers of fishing tackle, until his retirement in 1984. He wrote An Angler's Entomology, a book about mayflies for fly fishermen. He has been called, "perhaps the greatest living Irish angler-entomologist". He has also been described as, "a large affable man 'with a sharing attitude towards his whiskey and a colourful manner of expressing his trenchant views on fishing, fishermen, journalists, rugby, life and other matters'". Harris died in 1994.

== Bibliography ==
- Harris, J. R. (1952). An Angler's Entomology. London: Collins. ISBN 978-0007308187. New Naturalist #23
