= John D. Currey =

British zoologist

John Donald Currey (9 August 1932 – 18 December 2018), was a British zoologist who lectured at the University of York where he specialised in the biomechanics of mineralised tissues such as bone.

== Early life ==
He was born in Scunthorpe in 1932 and later the family moved to Pickwick, Wiltshire. He went to St Edward's School, Oxford, and completed his national service before reading zoology at Brasenose College, Oxford; he was awarded a "first" in 1956. After graduation he served as a whaling inspector in the Antarctic on board the whaling ship Southern Harvester.

== Career ==
He worked as a demonstrator in the zoology department at Oxford and completed his D. Phil. in 1961; the title of his thesis was "Functional aspects of the structure of bone, with special reference to Haversian systems". He moved to the new biology department at York University in 1964. He spent a year in 1969 at the Veterans Administration Hospital and Case Western Reserve University, Cleveland, USA. In 1970, he returned to York as a professor. Although his main area of research was the mechanics of bone, he spent some years studying the polymorphism of shell colouration in Cepaea snails, particularly in collaboration with Arthur Cain. He investigated bone and other hard tissues from a particularly diverse range of vertebrates (e.g. narwhal tusk, crocodile nasal bone and whale bulla), and a number of his papers dealt with the biomechanics of mollusc shells and other invertebrate skeletons. He was head of the Department of Biology at York from 1984 to 1990, after which he became Deputy Vice Chancellor. He retired in 1999 and was named as professor emeritus.

He was one of the first to point out that diffuse damage and microcracks can help make the bone stronger. "When bone starts to break thousands of little microcracks form. These microcracks are positioned sensibly in relation to the histological structure of the bone, but we don't know where they form in relation to the ultrastructure. Typically when microcracks form they only reach a few microns in length before they come to a halt. The big question is, what brings them to a halt?".

In 2013 the European Society of Biomechanics awarded him the Huiskes Medal for Biomechanics. He authored over one hundred papers, appearing between 1959 and 2020.

== Personal life ==
He married Jillian Vine in 1960, and they had two boys and a girl. He was a keen and proficient orienteerer.

== Books ==
- Animal Skeletons (1970). John D. Currey. Institute of Biology. Studies in biology: no. 22. New York, St. Martin's Press
- Mechanical Design in Organisms (1982). Stephen A. Wainwright, W. D. Biggs, John D. Currey. Princeton University Press
- The Mechanical Adaptations of Bones (1984). John D. Currey. Princeton University Press. ISBN 978-0691612171
- Bones: Structure and Mechanics (2002). John D. Currey. Princeton University Press. ISBN 978-0691128047
