= T. J. Roberts =

T. J. Roberts may refer to:

- T. J. Roberts (ornithologist)
- T. J. Roberts (politician)
