= Michael Proctor (botanist) =

English botanist (1929–2017)

Michael Charles Faraday Proctor PhD (21 January 1929 – 24 October 2017) was an English botanist and plant ecologist, lecturer and scientific author based at the University of Exeter. He retired from his post as Reader in Plant Ecology at Exeter University in 1994.

M.C.F. Proctor published more than 100 research papers, and was regarded as one of Britain's pre-eminent plant ecologists. In 1968 he revised and updated Arthur Tansley's book 'Britain's Green Mantle'. He was a contributing author to all of the five volumes of the definitive work on British Plant Communities, edited by J.Rodwell (1991-2000), and also wrote three books in the New Naturalist Series: two on pollination, and one on the vegetation of Britain and Ireland.

== Academic career ==
Proctor studied botany, zoology and chemistry for his undergraduate degree at Cambridge University, then did research on rock-roses (Helianthemum). In 1956 he published a significant work on the bryophyte flora of Cambridgeshire, which embodied "the accumulation of Cambridgeshire bryophyte records begun by Prof. P.W. Richards in 1927". Proctor’s flora set out the history of bryophyte recording in the vice-county of Cambridgeshire and provided a guide to the main habitats. It was the first detailed account of the bryophytes of that county since 1820, when the third edition of Relhan’s Flora Cantabrigiensis was published.

Proctor's interest in insects and pollination ecology dated from his student days, shared with Peter Yeo at Cambridge, and with whom he remained a life-long friend. After leaving Cambridge, Proctor was employed by the Nature Conservancy in North Wales for two years, before joining the Department of Biological Sciences at the University of Exeter in November 1956 where he taught botany and ecology until retiring in September 1994. His main research interests have included distribution and ecophysiology of bryophytes, especially with reference to the Dartmoor oakwoods such as Wistman's Wood; the vegetation and water chemistry of blanket bogs and mires, plus the distribution, ecology and physiology of the filmy ferns, Hymenophyllum tunbrigense and H. wilsonii.

Proctor was editor of Watsonia, the journal of the then Botanical Society of the British Isles from April 1961 to July 1971.

== Honours and recognition ==
Proctor was a foreign member of the Norwegian Academy of Sciences as well as being an honorary member of the Hungarian Society for Plant Physiology. He was also a Fellow of the Royal Photographic Society, a founder member of the Devon Wildlife Trust, and between 1969 and 1981 he was a trustee of Paignton Zoo, and was reappointed trustee again in 1991.

His contribution to botany and to the study of Whitebeam (Sorbus spp) in particular is honoured in the naming of a species of hybrid Rowan, of which only one plant is known to exist in the wild. Proctor’s Rowan (Sorbus x proctoris T.Rich) has Rowan (Sorbus aucuparia L.) and Sichuan Rowan (S. scalaris Koehne) as its parents and was discovered in the Avon Gorge.

The standard author abbreviation M.Proctor is used to indicate this person as the author when citing a botanical name.

== Selected publications ==
- Ivimey-Cook, R.B.; Proctor, Michael (1966). The Plant Communities of the Burren, Co. Clare. Dublin: Royal Irish Academy.
- Proctor, Michael (1956). "A bryophyte flora of Cambridgeshire". Transactions of the British Bryological Society. 3: 1–49. doi:10.1179/006813856804829723.
- Proctor, Michael (1957). "Helianthemum Mill: Biological Flora of the British Isles". Journal of Ecology. 78: 575–592. doi:10.2307/2256855. JSTOR 2256855.
- Proctor, Michael (1960). "Mosses and Liverworts of the Malham District". Field Studies. 1. London: Headley Bros: 61–85.
- Proctor, Michael (1967). "The Distribution of British Liverworts: A Statistical Analysis". Journal of Ecology. 55 (1): 119–135. doi:10.2307/2257721. JSTOR 2257721.
- Proctor, Michael; Yeo, Peter (1973). Pollination of Flowers. Harper Collins. ISBN 0002131781.
- Proctor, Michael (1974). "The vegetation of the Malham Tarn fens". Field Studies. 4. Faringdon: 1–38.
- Proctor, M.C.F.; Spooner, G.M.; Spooner, M. (1980). "Changes in Wistman's Wood, Devon: photographic and other evidence". Transactions of the Devonshire Association for the Advancement of Science. 112: 43–79.
- Proctor, Michael; Yeo, Peter; Lack, Andrew (1996). The Natural History of Pollination. London: Harper Collins New Naturalist.
- Proctor, Michael (2003). "Comparative Ecophysiological Measurements on the Light Responses, Water Relations and Desiccation Tolerance of the Filmy Ferns Hymenophyllum wilsonii Hook. and H. tunbrigense (L.) Smith". Annals of Botany. 916 (6): 717–727. doi:10.1093/aob/mcg077. PMC 4242359. PMID 12714369.
- Proctor, Michael (2013). Vegetation of Britain and Ireland. HarperCollins. ISBN 978-0-00-220148-3.
- Rich, T.; Houston, L.; Robertson, A.; Proctor, M. (2010). Whitebeams, Rowans and Service Trees of Britain and Ireland. BSBI Publications. ISBN 9780901158437.
- Rodwell, J.S., ed. (1991). British Plant Communities Volume 1. Woodlands and Scrub. ISBN 0521235588.
- Rodwell, J.S., ed. (1991). British Plant Communities Volume 2. Mires and Heaths. Cambridge University Press. ISBN 0-521-39165-2.
- Rodwell, J.S., ed. (1992). British Plant Communities Volume 3. Grasslands and Montane Communities. Cambridge University Press. ISBN 0-521-39166-0.
- Rodwell, J.S., ed. (1995). British Plant Communities Volume 4, Aquatic Communities, Swamps and Tall-Herb Fens. Cambridge University Press. ISBN 0-521-39168-7.
- Rodwell, J.S., ed. (2000). British Plant Communities Volume 5. Maritime Communities and Vegetation of Open Habitats. Cambridge University Press. ISBN 9780521644761.
