= Edward Allworthy Armstrong =

British ornithologist and Church of England clergyman

- Born: 8 October 1900; Corlea, Lowwood, Belfast
- Died: 19 December 1978 (aged 78)
- Education: Royal Belfast Academical Institution; Queen's University Belfast; Ridley Hall, Cambridge; Hong Kong University; Leeds University
- Occupations: Ornithologist; Church of England clergyman
- Awards: Special Union Gold Medal, British Ornithologists' Union; Stamford Raffles Award, Zoological Society of London

Edward Allworthy Armstrong (8 October 1900 – 19 December 1978) was a British ornithologist and Church of England clergyman.

Edward Allworthy Armstrong was born at Corlea, Lowwood, Belfast on 8 October 1900, the younger child and only son of Hamilton Armstrong, manufacturer's agent, and his wife, Mary Elizabeth Susan. He was educated at the Royal Belfast Academical Institution and then at Queen's University, Belfast, studying science in his first year then switching to philosophy, obtaining a BA (hons) in 1921. In preparation for ordination in the Anglican Church he then studied theology at Ridley Hall, Cambridge. He later studied anthropology and Chinese at Hong Kong University and obtained an MA in the history and philosophy of religion and in Chinese studies from Leeds University. As a young priest he travelled widely, serving in parishes in Doncaster, Ipswich, Hong Kong, and Leeds before settling in Cambridge in 1943 where he lived for the rest of his life.

He married Eunice Joan Uttley in 1940, and had two sons. He died in December 1978.

As an ornithologist, he was known for his study of bird behaviour and his intensive study of the wren (Troglodytes troglodytes). He travelled to many islands - including the Shetland Islands, Iceland, and St Kilda - to study the wren. In the 1960s he travelled to East Africa to study and to record 'duetting' in birds. He published a number of ornithological texts including Birds of the Grey Wind (1940), Bird display and behaviour (1942), The Way Birds Live (1943), the New Naturalist monograph The Wren (1955), The folklore of birds: an enquiry into the origin and distribution of some magico-religious traditions (1958), The Study of Bird Song (1963) and The Life and Lore of the Bird (1975). He also published two theological works books related to his work as a priest, The Gospel Parables (1967) and Saint Francis: Nature Mystic (1973), and a book which was initially intended as an assessment of how good a naturalist Shakespeare was, Shakespeare’s imagination: A study of the psychology of association and inspiration (1946). He eventually demonstrated that Shakespeare was no naturalist at all!

He was awarded the Burroughs Medal in the United States in 1942 for his book about his childhood in Ireland, Birds of the Grey Wind. In 1951 he became a Corresponding Fellow of the American Ornithologists' Union and received an honorary MA from Cambridge University. In 1952 he became a member of Jesus College, Cambridge. In 1959 he received the Special Union Gold Medal of the British Ornithologists’ Union on the occasion of that organisation's Centenary celebrations. He was Vice President of the British Ornithologists’ Union from 1963 to 1965. In 1966 he received the Stamford Raffles Award of the Zoological Society of London for ‘distinguished contributions to ornithology’.
