= Richard Jones (entomologist) =

British entomologist

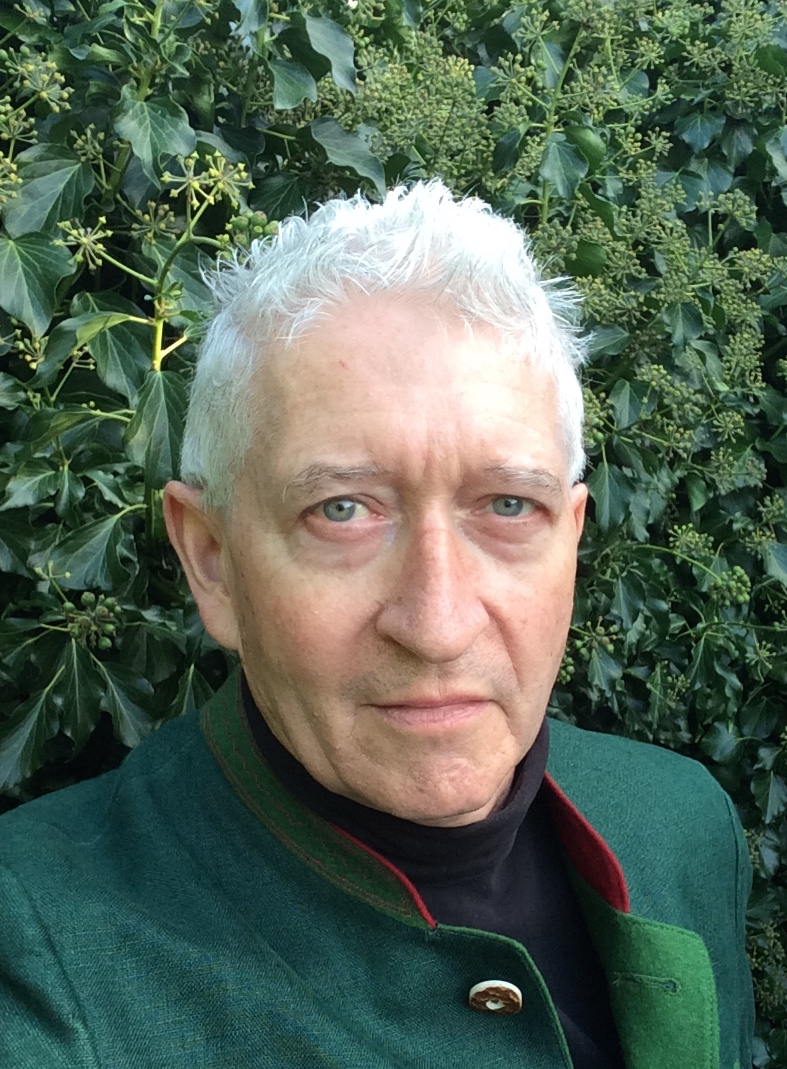
- Richard Jones in 2019
- Born: South Downs, Sussex, England
- Education: Newhaven Tideway Comprehensive School; University (Biology)
- Occupations: Entomologist, author
- Known for: Popular science writing on insects
- Notable work: Extreme Insects, Call of Nature, Beetles
- Honors: Fellow of the Royal Entomological Society; Fellow of the Linnean Society; Past president of the British Entomological and Natural History Society

Richard 'Bugman' Jones FRES is a British entomologist. He is a Fellow of the Royal Entomological Society and has written many books about insects.

== Career ==
Jones's childhood interest in insects was inspired by his father, who was a botanist. He grew up in the South Downs and the Sussex Weald and was educated at Newhaven Tideway Comprehensive School (now Seahaven Academy) in the early 1970s. At university he studied biology and he then worked as an engineer's assistant on the Lewes Cuilfail Tunnel, and in medical publishing, before moving back into entomology, doing ecological surveys for local councils and English Nature (now Natural England).

He regularly writes for New Scientist, Gardeners' World and BBC Wildlife, as well as appearing on programmes such as Springwatch Unsprung, BBC Radio 4's Home Planet and Natural Histories with Brett Westwood, including the episodes "Louse" and "Dung Beetle".

== Books ==
- New British Beetles: Species Not Found in Joy's Practical Handbook with Peter Hodge, published by the British Entomological & Natural History Society in 1995.
- Nano Nature: Nature's Spectacular Hidden World, published by HarperCollins in 2008.
- Extreme Insects, published by Collins in 2010.
- The Beekeepers Bible, with Sharon Sweeny-Lynch, published by Abrams Books in 2011.
- Mosquito, published by Reaktion Books, in 2012.
- The Little Book of Nits, with Justine Crow, published by Bloomsbury in 2012.
- House Guests, House Pests: A Natural History of Animals in the Home, published by Bloomsbury in 2015.
- Call of Nature, the Secret Life of Dung, published by Pelagic Publishing in 2017.
- Beetles, part of the New Naturalists Series, published by William Collins in 2018.
- Wasp, published by Reaktion books in 2019.

== Honours and awards ==
Jones is a Fellow of the Royal Entomological Society and of the Linnean Society. He is a past president of the British Entomological and Natural History Society.

Call of Nature was shortlisted for The Bookseller's Diagram Prize for the oddest book title of the year in 2018.
