= Bruce Campbell (ornithologist) =

English ornithologist, writer, and broadcaster (1912-1993) (1912–1993)

Bruce Campbell (15 June 1912 – 9 January 1993) was an English ornithologist, writer and broadcaster, closely associated with the British Trust for Ornithology (BTO).

== Life ==
Campbell was born in Southsea, Hampshire on 15 June 1912. As a young boy, he was influenced by his father, an army officer, birds-nester and egg-collector, who later became the British Army's Inspector of Physical Training. After education at Winchester College, he studied at the University of Edinburgh, obtaining a BSc in biology. He later gained a doctorate in comparative bird studies, so becoming one of the first field naturalists to also be a trained scientist. In 1938, he married Margaret Gibson-Hill, herself a writer, with whom he had two sons and one daughter. From 1936 to 1948, he was a teacher and university lecturer. After World War II, he brought the work of sound recordist Ludwig Koch to the attention of the BTO. In 1948, Campbell was appointed the first full-time secretary of the BTO, a post he held until 1959. He served on the panel of the Wildlife Collection with Julian Huxley, and was active in the British Ornithologists' Union, the British Ecological Society, and conservation bodies. He conducted a pioneering study of the pied flycatcher at the Nagshead woodland reserve, Gloucestershire. He made radio and television broadcasts relating to natural history for the BBC during the 1950s. In April 1959, despite his having had no previous experience as a producer, he was appointed senior producer at the BBC Natural History Unit in Bristol, a position he held until 1962. He died on 9 January 1993 in Witney, Oxfordshire.

== Works ==
- 1949: Snowdonia (with F. J. North and R. Scott). New Naturalist #13. Collins, London.
- 1953: Finding Nests. Collins' Clear Type Press, London.
- 1959: Bird Watching for Beginners. Puffin Books, London.
- 1967: The Pictorial Encyclopedia of Birds (editor, with Jan Hanzák (author)). Paul Hamlyn, London. ISBN 978-0517005491
- 1969: British and European Birds in Colour (editor, with Bertel Bruun (author) and Arthur B. Singer (illustrator)). Paul Hamlyn, London. ISBN 978-0600004561
- 1970: The Hamlyn Guide to Birds of Britain and Europe (editor, with Bertel Bruun (author) and Arthur B. Singer (illustrator)). Paul Hamlyn, London. ISBN 978-0601070657
- 1972: A Field Guide to Birds' Nests (with James Ferguson-Lees). Constable, London. ISBN 978-0094583504
- 1974: The Dictionary of Birds in Colour. Michael Joseph Ltd, London. ISBN 978-0718112578
- 1977: Birds of Coast and Sea. Britain and Northern Europe. Oxford University Press. ISBN 0192176617
- 1978-79: The Natural History of Britain and Northern Europe (editor with James Ferguson-Lees). Hodder & Stoughton, London. Five volume series: ISBN 978-0340226148, ISBN 978-0340226155, ISBN 978-0340231531, ISBN 978-0340231548 and ISBN 978-0340231555
- 1979: Birdwatcher at Large. Littlehampton Book Services, UK. ISBN 978-0460043731
- 1985: A Dictionary of Birds (editor, with Elizabeth Lack). Poyser, Calton, UK. ISBN 978-1408138403
