= Lionel George Higgins =

British surgeon and lepidopterist

- Born: May 26, 1891; Bedford, England
- Died: October 9, 1985 (aged 94)
- Education: Clare College, Cambridge; St Thomas' Hospital
- Known for: A Field Guide to the Butterflies of Britain and Europe; Taxonomy of Melitaea butterflies
- Spouse: Nesta Farquhar (m. 1925)
- Parents: Frederick Higgins (father); Mabel Higgins (mother)
- Awards: Raffles Award (Zoological Society of London); H.H. Bloomer award (Linnean Society)
- Scientific career
- Fields: Lepidopterology, Surgery

Lionel George Higgins (26 May 1891 – 9 October 1985) was a British surgeon and a hobby lepidopterist who produced a major fieldguide to the butterflies of Britain and Europe. He revised the taxonomy of the genus Melitaea and a species from Afghanistan, Melitaea higginsi was named his honour by the Japanese lepidopterist Seiji Sakai in 1978.

== Life and work ==
Higgins was born in Bedford to Frederick and Mabel Higgins. He grew up in Hertfordshire and suffered from rheumatic fever at a young age. He entered Clare College, Cambridge and received a medical degree in 1917 at St Thomas' Hospital. He became FRCS in 1920 and served in the navy during World War I. He then worked as a family physician and later specialized in gynecology. He lived in Woking from 1922 and helped establish the Woking Maternity Hospital in 1940.

Higgins took an interest in natural history at an early age but from 1922 he worked on the taxonomy and systematics of the butterflies. He published his major work - A Field Guide to the Butterflies of Britain and Europe (1970) - in collaboration with Norman D. Riley. Associated with this he published The Classification of European Butterflies (1975). He was also an avid collector of butterflies, colling as far afield as in Kashmir, the Pamirs and the Urals. His collection of over 30000 specimens was bequeathed to the Natural History Museum in London. He also collected rare books on butterflies which went to the Hope collections at Oxford.

Higgins married Nesta née Farquhar in 1925. He received a Raffles Award from the Zoological Society of London and a H.H. Bloomer award from the Linnean Society.
