= R. J. Berry =

British geneticist, naturalist and Christian theorist

Robert James "Sam" Berry FRSE FSB (26 October 1934 – 29 March 2018) was a British geneticist, naturalist and Christian theorist. He was professor of genetics at University College London between 1974 and 2000. Before that he was a lecturer in genetics at The Royal Free Hospital School of Medicine in London. He was president from 1983 to 1986 of the Linnean Society, the British Ecological Society and the European Ecological Federation. He was one of the founding trustees on the creation of National Museums Liverpool in 1986. As a Christian, Berry spoke out in favour of theistic evolution, served as a lay member of the Church of England's General Synod and as president of Christians in Science. He was a member of the Board of Governors of Monkton Combe School from 1979 to 1991. He gave the 1997–98 Glasgow Gifford Lectures entitled Gods, Genes, Greens and Everything. His father, A. J. Berry, died in 1947.

== Early life and education ==
Berry was educated at Kirkham Grammar School and Shrewsbury School. One of his first published works in 1961 was in the "Teach yourself books" series Genetics. The paperback version was released in 1972.

== Bibliography ==
=== Biological works ===
- Teach yourself books Genetics. (1965) ISBN 978-0340055939
- Inheritance and Natural History. New Naturalist series no. 61 (1977)
- The Natural History of Shetland. New Naturalist series no. 64 (1980)
- The Natural History of Orkney. New Naturalist series no. 70 (1985)
- Genes in Ecology (ed. R. J. Berry, T. J. Crawford, G. M. Hewitt, N. R. Webb) (1992) ISBN 0-521-54936-1
- Islands. New Naturalist series no. 109 (2009) ISBN 978-0-00-726737-8

=== Religious works ===
- Adam and the Ape: a Christian Approach to the Theory of Evolution / [by] R. J. Berry · London : Church Pastoral-Aid Society, 1975 · 80 p.
- God and the Biologist: Personal Exploration of Science and Faith (Apollos 1996) ISBN 0-85111-446-6
- Science, Life and Christian Belief:A Survey of Contemporary Issues (IVP 1998) (preface by Berry) ISBN 0-8010-2226-6
- The Care of Creation: Focusing Concern and Action (IVP 2000) (edited by Berry) ISBN 0-8308-1556-2
- God's Book of Works:The Nature and Theology of Nature (T & T Clark International 2003) ISBN 0-567-08915-0 (Gifford Lectures 1997–98)
- "Did Darwin Kill God?" in God for the 21st Century, Russell Stannard ed., Templeton Foundation Press, 2000, ISBN 1-890151-39-4
- God and Evolution: Creation, Evolution, and the Bible (Regent College Publishing 2001) ISBN 1-57383-173-5
- Creation and Evolution, Not Creation or Evolution (2007, Faraday Institute Paper no. 12)
