= Derek Ratcliffe =

Derek Almey Ratcliffe (9 July 1929 – 23 May 2005) was one of the most significant English nature conservationists of the 20th century. He was Chief Scientist for the Nature Conservancy Council at the Monks Wood Experimental Station, Abbots Ripton, Huntingdon, retiring in 1989. Ratcliffe was the author of the 1977 Nature Conservation Review, a document which set out the most important sites for nature conservation in the United Kingdom. He also published various works on nature and conservation.

== Biography ==
Derek Ratcliffe grew up in Carlisle, and married his wife, Jeannette, in March 1978.

Ratcliffe was the first person to discover the link between the use by farmers of pesticides—such as DDT and Dieldrin—and the decline of British populations of birds of prey, particularly the peregrine falcon.

He was instrumental in persuading the UK government to end the tax advantages available for planting non-native conifer forests on Scottish peat bogs, which was threatening the internationally important large wetland area of Caithness and Sutherland known as the Flow Country.

Ratcliffe studied for a PhD at the University of Wales, Bangor, completing it in 1953. He then undertook National Service. He was awarded the British Trust for Ornithology's Bernard Tucker Medal in 1964.

One of his most often cited works is a study on egg shell breakage conducted in the 1960s. Some, including Rachel Carson in her book Silent Spring, have interpreted the study as establishing a causal link between DDT contamination and thinning of egg shells in raptors.

Among his many other studies of the topic are papers on the effect on specific bird species, such as the peregrine falcon, the raven, In these studies he developed "Ratcliffe's Index," considered "a reliable measure of relative shell thickness"

== Publications ==
Derek Ratcliffe's most important publications include:

- Plant Communities of the Scottish Highlands (1962, with Donald McVean)
- A Nature Conservation Review (1977 ISBN 0-521-21159-X)
- The Peregrine Falcon (Poyser, 1980; expanded second edition 1993)
- Bird Life of Mountain and Upland (Cambridge University Press, 1991 ISBN 0-521-33123-4)
- The Raven (Poyser, 1997)
- In Search of Nature (Broadfield, 2000)
- Lakeland (Collins New Naturalist, 2002 ISBN 0-00-711304-8)
- Lapland: a natural history (Poyser, 2005 ISBN 0-7136-6529-7)
- Galloway and the Borders (Collins New Naturalist, 2007 ISBN 0-00-717401-2. Completed a few days before his death in 2005)
