= Willis Norton Whitney =

American physician, missionary (1855–1918)

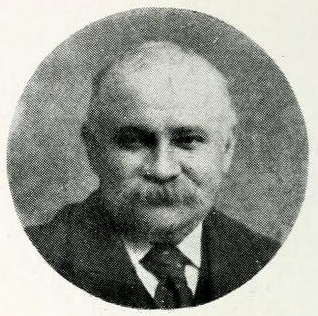
- Born: 18 October 1855; Newark, New Jersey, U.S.
- Died: 26 October 1918 (aged 63); Oxfordshire, England
- Burial place: Southam Road Cemetery
- Other name: W. Norton Whitney
- Occupations: Physician; philanthropist; ophthalmic surgeon; missionary; educator
- Spouse: Mary Caroline Braithwaite (m. 1885)

Academic background
- Education: University of Tokyo; University of Pennsylvania

Willis Norton Whitney (18 October 1855 – 26 October 1918) was an American physician, ophthalmic surgeon, missionary, and educator. He is known for his Quaker missionary work, and philanthropic works in 19th century Japan.

== Early life and education ==
Willis Norton Whitney was born on 18 October 1855, in Newark, New Jersey, United States. He immigrated with his family to Japan in 1875, where his father William Cogswell Whitney was a teacher at Hitotsubashi University of Tokyo.

Whitney studied medicine at the University of Tokyo (formerly known as Tokyo Imperial University). He returned to the United States with his parents, and continued his medical degree at the University of Pennsylvania which he finished in 1882.

Whitney and Mary Caroline Braithwaite married on 29 December 1885.

== Career ==
While he attended school in Tokyo, Whiney also taught students at the Government Normal School in Kanazawa, Japan.

Whitney later served as the director of the Akasaka Mission Hospital in Tokyo, Japan. He was the vice-president of the Society for the Advancement of Medical Science in Japan.

He left Japan in 1911. Whitney died at the age of 63 on 26 October 1918, in Oxfordshire, England, and was buried at the Southam Road Cemetery in Banbury, England.

== Bibliography ==
He is the author of a number of notable books:

- Whitney, W. Norton (1885). Notes on the History of Medical Progress in Japan. Yokohama, Japan: R. Meiklejohn and Company.
- Whitney, W. Norton (1888). Index of Chinese Characters in Hepburn's Dictionary Arranged According to Their Radicals. Tokyo, Japan: Z.P. Maruya & Co.
- Whitney, W. Norton (1889). Dictionary of the Principal Roads, Chief Towns Etc. of Japan. Z.P. Maruya and Co., Ltd.
