= Adaptive value =

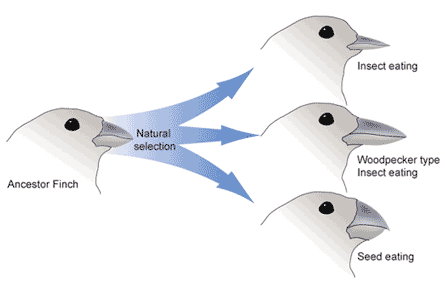
The variation that can best adapted to their surroundings will survive.

The adaptive value represents the combined influence of all characters which affect the fitness of an individual or population.

== Definition ==
Adaptive value is an essential concept of population genetics. It represents usefulness of a trait that can help an organism to survive in its environment. This heritable trait that can help offspring to cope with the new surrounding or condition is a measurable quantity. Measuring adaptive value increases our understanding of how a trait helps an individual's or population's chances of survival in a particular set of conditions.

== Measurement ==
The adaptive value can be measured by contribution of an individual to the gene pool of their offspring. The adaptive values are approximately calculated from the rates of change in frequency and mutation–selection balance.

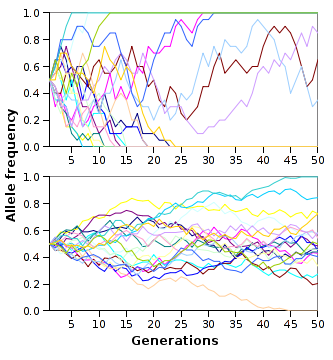

== Examples ==
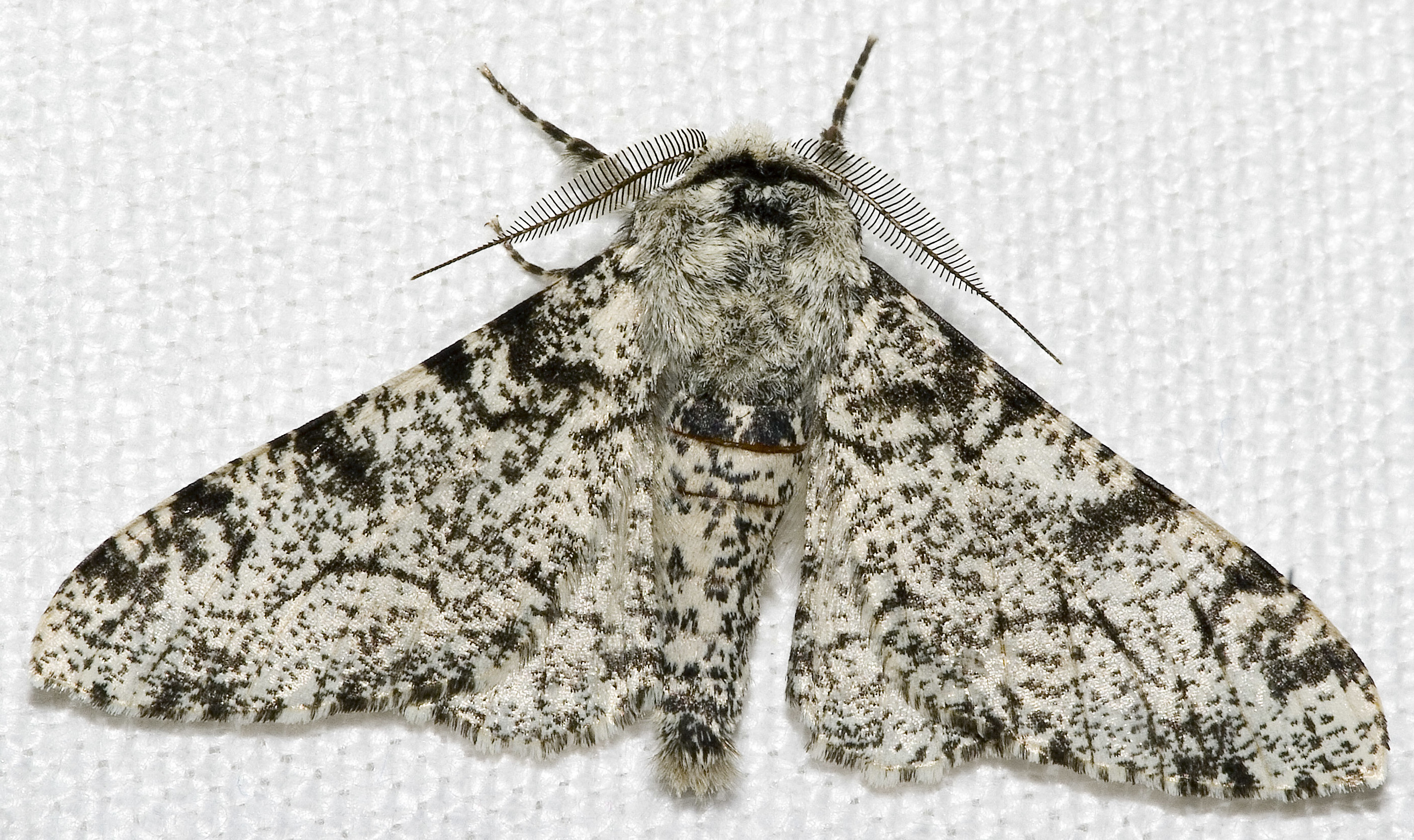
Biston betularia f. typica is the white-bodied form of the peppered moth.

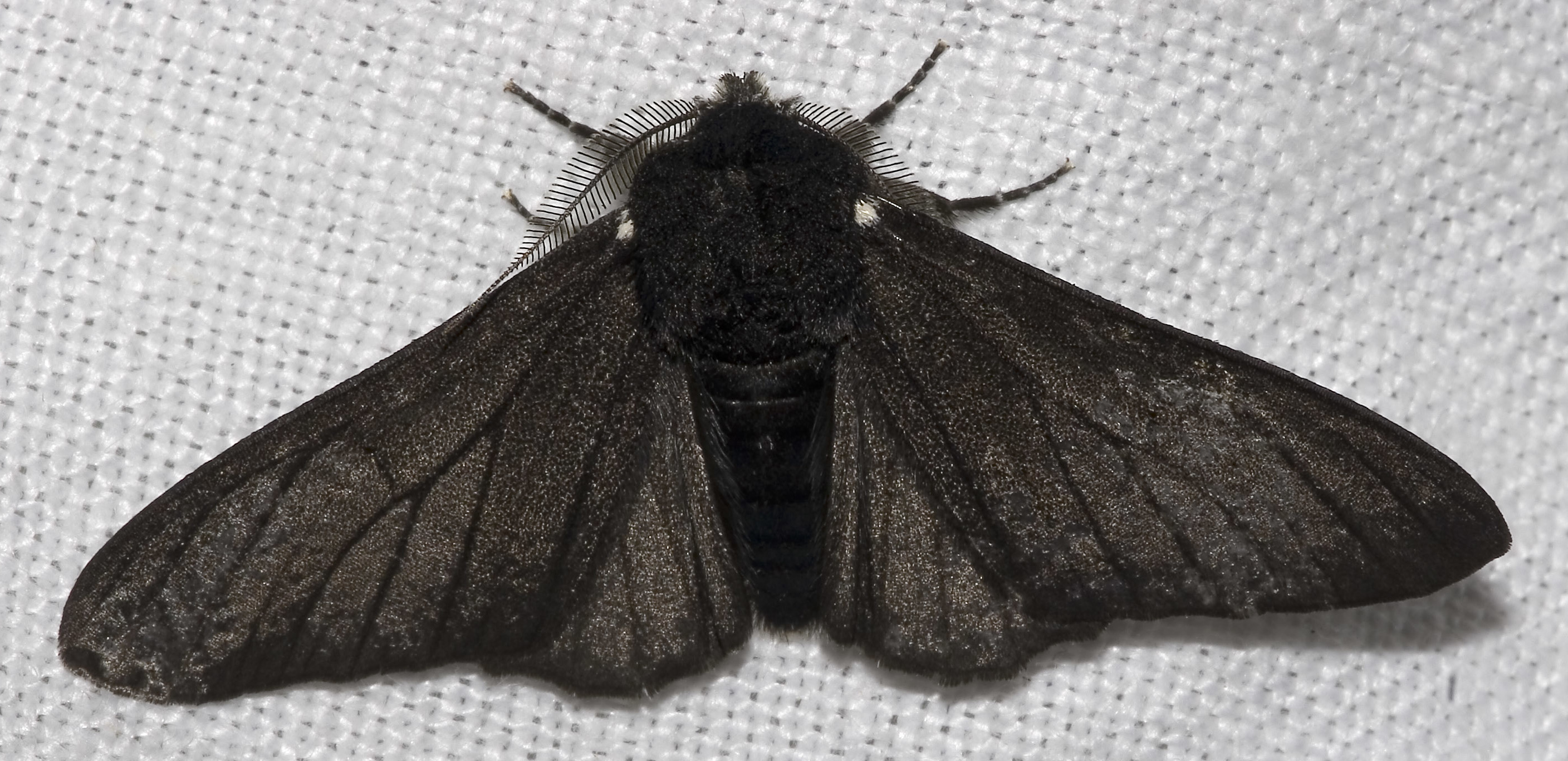
Biston betularia f. carbonaria is the black-bodied form of the peppered moth.

- Avoiding Predators Some plants use indirect plant defenses to protect themselves against their herbivorous consumers. One of defensive mechanism that plants employ is to release volatile chemicals when herbivores are feeding from them. The odor of volatile chemical attracts carnivores' attention, and they get rid of herbivores by eating them.
- Sexual Reproduction Advantages Sexual mimicry is common among animals. Male cuttlefishes uses this strategy to gain advantage over other males competitor. They mimic female cuttlefish's marking to fool guarding male and fertilize their females. This strategy has more success rate than normal courtship.

== See also ==
- Adaptation
- Evolution
