= Colin Butler (entomologist) =

British entomologist

Colin Gasking Butler (26 October 1913 – 4 January 2016) was a British entomologist who first isolated the pheromone, known as "queen substance", which attracts drones to queen bees.

The son of a schoolmaster, Butler was born at Horsham and educated at Monkton Combe School, Bath, and at Queens' College, Cambridge. Following his graduation, he won a scholarship doing research at the Ministry of Agriculture and Fisheries and was later appointed to superintend Cambridge University's entomological field station.

He eventually left Cambridge for the entomology department of the Rothamsted Experimental Station at Harpenden, where his research helped to uncover the "queen substance" pheromone. He worked at Rothamsted until his retirement in 1976 as head of the entomology department, publishing several books.

== Other ==
Butler served as president of the Cornwall Naturalists Trust and the National Trust Regional Committee member for Devon and Cornwall.

== Death ==
Butler died on 4 January 2016 at the age of 102 after a short illness.
