= Peter Marren =

British author and naturalist

- Born: 1950 (age 75–76)
- Education: University of Exeter; University College London
- Occupation: Author
- Writing career
- Language: English
- Subjects: Nature; Military history
- Notable awards: Leverhulme Research Fellowship; 2008

Peter Marren (born 1950) is a British writer, journalist, and naturalist. He has written over 20 books about British nature, including Chasing the Ghost: My Search for all the Wild Flowers of Britain (2018), an account of a year-long quest to see every wild flower in the UK; Rainbow Dust: Three Centuries of Butterfly Delight (2016); Bugs Britannica (2010); and After They're Gone: Extinctions Past, Present and Future (2022). Marren has also written a number of books about military history and battlefields and, as a journalist, many national newspaper articles.

== Early life and career ==
Marren grew up in a series of mostly rural locations in England, Germany and Singapore as the son of an officer in the RAF. His memoir of childhood, Where the Wild Thyme Blew, was published in 2016. He studied botany at the University of Exeter between 1969 and 1972, and conservation at University College London in 1972–73. From 1977 he worked for the Nature Conservancy Council (NCC - the forerunner of English Nature and Natural England) in Scotland as the local officer for the north-east region based in Aberdeen. In 1984 he returned to England as local officer for Oxfordshire and then as the NCC's author-editor based at its headquarters in Peterborough. Since 1992, he has been a professional naturalist, author, editor, and journalist. He has also served as a board director of Kemerton Conservation Trust, a nature conservation organization that works across Gloucestershire, Herefordshire, Worcestershire, and adjoining counties.

== Books ==
Outside the professional world of nature conservation, Marren is best known as a writer of nature books, several of which have won awards or been selected as picks of the year by national newspapers.

Chasing the Ghost (2018) was one of The Guardian's best books of 2018. Rainbow Dust, his 2016 book about butterflies, described as "part autobiography of an entomologist, part-cultural history of butterflies in Britain", was a Times Book of the Week. It was also picked as "the very best natural history book I have read this year" by the ornithologist and writer Mark Avery, described as a "truly marvellous... love letter to the butterfly" by Sophia Waugh in The Telegraph, and praised by Caroline Morley, in New Scientist, for its "charming but old-school lyricism". In The Independent, Marren's 2012 book Mushrooms earned praise for its "quite staggering knowledge" and "quirky, trenchantly observant, sometimes hilarious" writing. Bugs Britannica (2010), a definitive survey of British invertebrates edited by Richard Mabey, earned Marren a Leverhulme Research Fellowship in 2008. The New Naturalists (2006) won the Society for the History of Natural History John Thackray Medal. Another of Marren's books, Britain's Rare Flowers (1999), won the Botanical Society of Britain and Ireland President's Award.

Marren's recent book, The Consolation of Nature (2020), about seeking solace from the stresses of COVID-19 in the natural world, co-written with Michael McCarthy and Jeremy Mynott, was one of The Guardian's best nature books of 2020.

Marren's book After They're Gone (2022) looks at extinctions of species in the past, present, and future.

His most recent book, The Devil's Garden (2026), explores "sinister" plants and fungi that are toxic, stinging, foul-smelling, or otherwise challenging to live with, including stinging nettles, brambles, henbane, and Japanese knotweed.

Marren is also a keen military historian and has written a number of books about notable battles, including 1066: The Battles of York, Stamford Bridge & Hastings (2004), Battles of the Dark Ages (2006), and Grampian Battlefields: The Historic Battles of North East Scotland from AD84 to 1745 (1990).

== Journalism and other writing ==
Marren has been a regular contributor to national "broadsheet" newspapers since the 1990s, including The Daily Telegraph (for which he has been a long-standing nature columnist), The Times, The Independent, and The Guardian. He has written numerous obituaries of botanists, conservationists, and naturalists, including Oliver Rackham, David Bellamy, Hugh Synge, and Eva Crane. He has contributed a satirical column titled "Twitcher in the Swamp" to every issue of British Wildlife magazine since it was first published in 1990.

In 1997, Marren authored a provocative 44-page report titled A Muzzled Watchdog? Is English Nature protecting wildlife? for WWF, the conservation NGO. It was a catalogue of what he argued were systematic failures by English Nature to speak up for threatened nature sites: "...from Newbury Bypass to Offham Downs, from Peterborough to Thorne and Hatfield Moors, it has been the voluntary sector and local people who have tried to secure the best outcome for wildlife in the face of an English Nature apparently unable or unwilling to take the lead." The Guardian devoted much of its front page to the story, with a large picture of the destroyed chalk download at Twyford Down and the headline: "The guardians of nature: 'secretive, defensive and turning a blind eye to destruction'". According to New Scientist, English Nature dismissed the report "vitriolically" as "subterranean school magazine stuff", though one of its staff told the magazine that "I have no substantial problems with the thrust of the criticisms".

Marren wrote several other "campaigning" reports for NGOs around this time, including Greater Protection for Wildlife?: Wildlife Sites Under Threat in Ministers' Constituencies, for Friends of the Earth in 1998, and Where Have all the Flowers Gone?: A Study of Local Extinctions as Recorded in the County Floras, for Plantlife, in 2000. He has also written reports for The Battlefields Trust, including, in 1995, a detailed account of the Battle of Tewkesbury for a public inquiry into a proposed housing development.

In 2006, in Natural England's first year, Marren warned in an Independent article that the organization was "already under siege" with a huge funding shortfall, plummeting morale, and "mutterings about the new management culture". Twelve months later, he reported on the multiple challenges the organization had faced during a "torrid first year".

Reprising the theme in 2011, he argued in The Independent that Natural England had fallen short of expectations: "With next to no public debate, our wildlife watchdog has morphed into a pathetic delivery boy, charged with attending to "customer focus". Marren made the case for "a new focus on wildlife. We need an independent voice, led by a powerful and knowledgeable personality who can speak up for wildlife. And not just for ourselves and our own survival, but for the thousands of wild species which might not survive for much longer".

== Selected publications ==
=== Nature books ===
- Marren, Peter (1982). A Natural History of Aberdeen. R. Callander. ISBN 978-0-907184-03-4.
- — (1990). Woodland Heritage. David & Charles. ISBN 9780715394366.
- — (1995). The New Naturalists. HarperCollins Publishers. ISBN 9780007406685.
- — (1999). Britain's Rare Flowers. T & A D Poyser Natural History. ISBN 9780856611148.
- — (2002). Nature Conservation: A Review of the Conservation of Wildlife in Britain, 1950–2001. HarperCollins. ISBN 0007113064.
- — (2016). Where the Wild Thyme Blew: Growing Up with Nature in the Fifties and Sixties. Pisces Publications. ISBN 978-1-874357-76-6.
- — (2016). Rainbow Dust: Three Centuries of Butterfly Delight. University of Chicago Press. ISBN 9780226395883.
- — (2018). Chasing the Ghost: My Search for All the Wild Flowers of Britain. Random House. ISBN 9781473524880.
- — (2018). Mushrooms: The Natural and Human World of British Fungi. Bloomsbury Publishing. ISBN 9781472958518.
- — (2020). Emperors, Admirals and Chimney-Sweepers: The Naming of Butterflies and Moths. Little Toller Books. ISBN 978-1-908213-71-6.
- — (2022). After They're Gone: Extinctions Past, Present, and Future. Hodder & Stoughton. ISBN 9781529393408.
- — (2024). Rare Plants. Bloomsbury Publishing. ISBN 1399407333.
- — (2026). More Twitching Through the Swamp. YouCaxton. ISBN 1918172188.
- — (2026). The Devil's Garden: The World's Most Sinister Plants and Fungi. Bloomsbury. ISBN 1399425463.

=== Collaborations ===
- Marren, Peter; Birkhead, Mike (1996). Postcards from the Country: Living Memories of the British Countryside. Isis Publishing. ISBN 978-0-7531-5415-1.
- Rothschild, Miriam; Marren, Peter (1997). Rothschild's Reserves: Time and Fragile Nature. Balaban Publishers. ISBN 978-0-946589-62-3.
- Salmon, Michael; Marren, Peter; Harley, Basil (2000). The Aurelian Legacy: British Butterflies and Their Collectors. University of California Press. ISBN 978-0-520-22963-1.
- Marren, Peter; Carstairs, David (2004). Twitching Through the Swamp. Swamp Publishing. ISBN 0954826701.
- Marren, Peter; Gillmor, Robert (2009). The Art of the New Naturalists: Forms from Nature. Collins. ISBN 978-0-00-728471-9.
- Marren, Peter; Mabey, Richard (2010). Bugs Britannica. Chatto & Windus. ISBN 9780007406685.
- McCarthy, Michael; Mynott, Jeremy; Marren, Peter (2020). The Consolation of Nature: Spring in the Time of Coronavirus. Hodder & Stoughton. ISBN 9781529349160.

=== Military books ===
- Marren, Peter (1990). Grampian Battlefields: The Historic Battles of North East Scotland from AD84 to 1745. Aberdeen University Press.
- — (2004). 1066: The Battles of York, Stamford Bridge & Hastings. Pen & Sword Books. ISBN 9781783460021.
- — (2006). Battles of the Dark Ages. Pen and Sword. ISBN 978-1-84884-706-4.
