= Oliver Rackham =

English academic (1939–2015)

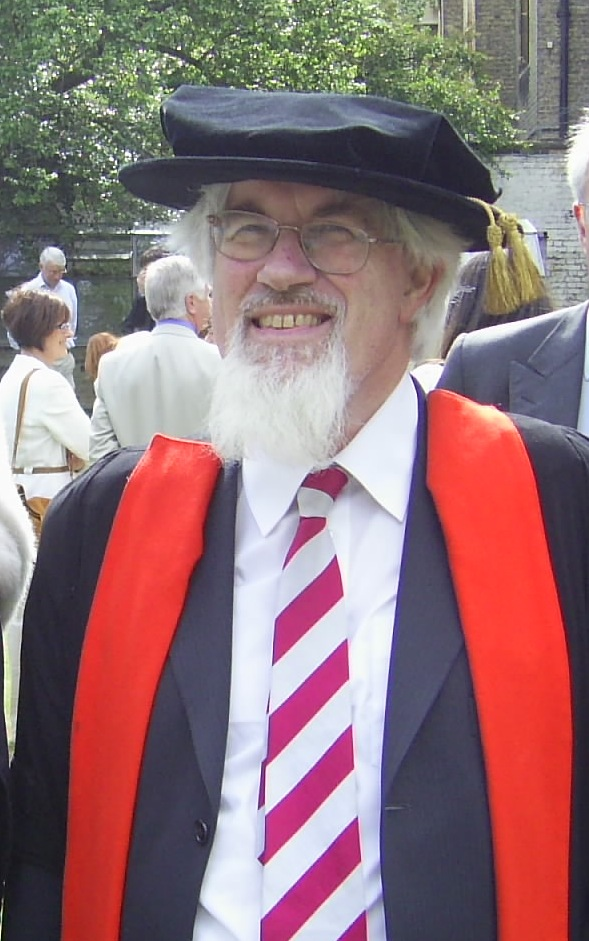
- Born: 17 October 1939; Bungay, England
- Died: 12 February 2015 (aged 75); Cambridge, England
- Education: University of Cambridge
- Known for: woodlands, historical ecology
- Awards: Order of the British Empire (1998)
- Scientific career
- Fields: Botany
- Workplaces: University of Cambridge

Oliver Rackham OBE, FBA (17 October 1939 – 12 February 2015) was an academic at the University of Cambridge who studied the ecology, management and development of the British countryside, especially trees, woodlands and wood pasture. His books included Ancient Woodland (1980) and The History of the Countryside (1986).

== Life and academic career ==
Rackham was born in Bungay in Suffolk, and attended Norwich School. In 1958 he won a scholarship to Corpus Christi College, Cambridge, graduating in Natural Sciences in 1961 and subsequently gaining a PhD. He began his academic career studying physics, but moved between several Cambridge departments (where his field notebooks are now digitally archived). He conducted research in the Department of Botany from 1964 to 1968 and 1972 to 1990, and the Plant Breeding Institute of Cambridge from 1968 to 1972. He transferred to the Department of Geography from 1988 to 2000, latterly as Professor, and was appointed Honorary Professor of Historical ecology in the Department of Plant Sciences in 2006 and Honorary Director of the Cambridge Centre for Landscape and People in 2010. Rackham also worked as a tutor in the Kingcombe Centre in Dorset, teaching about the history of woodlands.

He was associated with Corpus Christi College from his student days. He briefly served as Master of the College from 2007 to 2008, and was made a Life Fellow in 2010.

== Contributions ==
Rackham was a prolific historical ecologist whose prime interest was the function, history, and management of British woodlands. He kept a series of notebooks, which he began during his youth and continued until his death, in which he recorded observations on plants seen in his home surroundings and on his travels, in addition to information about the weather and his college duties. Arising from his research on Hayley Wood in Cambridgeshire, he developed the concept of ancient woodland, rich in plant diversity and managed through traditional practices. His 1980 book Ancient Woodland, its History, Vegetation and Uses in England led to the recognition of such areas by the Forestry Commission and in planning legislation. It also helped to alter forestry industry views about woodland conservation. The Woodland Trust became a larger woodland owner to ensure conservation. He argued for the preservation of traditional management techniques like coppicing, to let light in to increase in the diversity of the herb layer.

In 1986 he published The History of the Countryside, regarded as his greatest achievement and described as "a magisterial 400-page account of the British landscape from prehistory to the present day, with chapters on aspects ranging from woodland and hedgerows to marshes and the sea." The book won several awards for literature. His other books include Woodlands (2006), in the Collins New Naturalist series, and he also wrote on Hatfield Forest.

As well as working in England, he studied and published extensively on the ecology and landscape of Crete, co-writing The Making of the Cretan Landscape with Jenny Moody in 1998, and latterly leading a (failed) protest against the granting of planning permission for the Cavo Sidero golf and hotel project on the island's eastern tip. Corpus Christi College named one of their boats 'Rackham the Red' in his honour.

== Personal life ==
Rackham was an only child, and was unmarried. He died on 12 February 2015 at the age of 75 after a short illness.

== Awards ==
- OBE for "services to Nature Conservation", 1998.
- Fellow of the British Academy, 2002.
- Honorary Doctorate, University of Essex, 2000
- For The History of the Countryside: 1986 Angel Literary Award, the Sir Peter Kent Conservation Prize and the Natural World Book of the Year.

== Selected works ==
- Rackham, Oliver (1976). Trees and Woodland in the British Landscape. Archaeology in the Field Series (First ed.). London: J.M. Dent & Sons Ltd. ISBN 0-460-04183-5.
- Rackham, Oliver (1980). Ancient Woodland: its history, vegetation and uses in England (new ed.). Kirkcudbrightshire: Castlepoint Press (republished 2003).
- Rackham, Oliver (1986). The History of the Countryside: The full fascinating story of Britain's landscape. London: J.M. Dent & Sons Ltd. ISBN 0-460-04449-4.
- Rackham, Oliver (1986). The Ancient Woodland of England: The Woods of South-East Essex. Rochford District Council. ISBN 0-9511863-0-2.
- Rackham, Oliver (1989). The Last Forest: The story of Hatfield Forest. London: J.M. Dent & Sons Ltd.
- Rackham, Oliver (1990). Trees and Woodland in the British Landscape. Archaeology in the Field Series (Revised ed.). London: J.M. Dent & Sons Ltd. ISBN 0-460-04786-8.
- Rackham, Oliver; Moody, Jennifer (1996). The making of the Cretan landscape. Manchester: Manchester University Press. ISBN 0-7190-3647-X.
- Rackham, Oliver (1998). The Last Forest: The story of Hatfield Forest (Paperback ed.). London: Phoenix Press. ISBN 0-7538-0525-1.
- Rackham, Oliver (2001). Trees and woodland in the British landscape: the complete history of Britain's trees, woods & hedgerows. London: Phoenix Press. ISBN 1-84212-469-2.
- Grove, A.T.; Rackham, Oliver (2003). The Nature of Mediterranean Europe: An Ecological History (Second printing with corrections ed.). New Haven and London: Yale University Press. ISBN 0-300-10055-8.
- Rackham, Oliver (2003). The Illustrated History of the Countryside. London: Weidenfeld & Nicolson. ISBN 0-297-84335-4.
- Rackham, Oliver (2006). Woodlands. New Naturalist series. London: HarperCollins. ISBN 0-00-720243-1.
- Rackham, Oliver (2007). Transitus Beati Fursei: A Translation of the 8th Century Manuscript Life of Saint Fursey. Fursey Pilgrims. ISBN 978-0-954-47732-5.
- Rackham, Oliver (2014). The Ash Tree. A Little Toller Monograph. Dorset: Little Toller Books. ISBN 978-1908213143.
- Rackham, Oliver (2019). The Ancient Woods of the Helford River. Little Toller Books. ISBN 978-1-908213-68-6.
- Rackham, Oliver (2022). The Ancient Woods of South-East Wales. Dorset: Little Toller Books. ISBN 978-1908213747. (published posthumously)

Academic offices
| Preceded by Alan Wilson | Master of Corpus Christi College, Cambridge; 2007–2008 | Succeeded by Stuart Laing |
