= T. J. Roberts (ornithologist) =

British ornithologist (1924–2013)

Thomas Jones Roberts (1924 – 2013) was a British ornithologist who was known for his work on the wildlife of Pakistan. Amongst his works are Mammals of Pakistan and Birds of Pakistan.

== Early life ==
Roberts was born to Sir William Roberts, a civil servant who worked in the Indian Agriculture Service. He first came to the region in 1946.

== Career ==
Roberts has been the managing director of Roberts Cotton Associates Ltd, a company founded by his father, since 1966.

== Awards ==
- Sitara-e-Imtiaz (1994)
- Stamford Raffles Award (2002)
- World Wildlife Fund Award for Conservation Merit (thrice)

== Bibliography ==
- Birds of Pakistan. 2 volumes. First edition: 1991
- The Mammals of Pakistan (1977)
- Butterflies of Pakistan (2001)
- Field Guide to the Small Mammals of Pakistan (2005)
- Field Guide to the Large and Medium-sized Mammals of Pakistan (2005)
