= F. J. North =

Geologist and museum curator

Frederick John North (1889–1968) was a British geologist and museum curator.

He was a lifelong advocate and populariser of geology, and was from 1914–59 Keeper of Geology at the National Museum of Wales. He trained as a palaeontologist, specialising in fossil brachiopods; but from the 1920s, he wrote and spoke broadly about slate, coal, ironstone and limestone. He was a keen historian, cartographer, archaeologist, caver and photographer. He was a founder member of the British Association for History of Science.

== Bibliography ==
- 1930: The River Scenery at the Head of the Vale of Neath, National Museum of Wales, Cardiff
- 1937: Humphrey Lhuyd's maps of England and of Wales. National Museum of Wales, Cardiff.
- 1949: Snowdonia (with B. Campbell and R. Scott). New Naturalist #13. Collins, London.
