= Ted Benton =

British sociologist and philosopher

Ted Benton is a British academic.

== Career ==
As an academic, Benton works as an emeritus professor of sociology at the University of Essex. He has taught subjects such as social theory and environmental social science for more than forty years.

His most notable book is Philosophical Foundations of the Three Sociologies, published by Routledge, which was reviewed in Sociology, Acta Sociologica and the American Journal of Sociology. He was influential in some of the early discussions that grew into the critical realism tradition in philosophy of science and the social sciences and has since maintained a realist position, though outside the mainstream of critical realism. He has had a particular interest in the relation between the social and natural sciences, where he has criticized some of the more constructionist approaches to this relation. He has also been a strong advocate of eco-socialist ideas, influenced by the Marxist tradition.

Alongside his work in philosophy and social theory, Benton is an active natural historian, who has published well regarded works, specializing in insects and particularly in bees. In 2007, he received the Stamford Raffles Award given by the Zoological Society of London.

== Books ==
- Philosophical Foundations of the Three Sociologies (1977)
- The Rise and Fall of Structural Marxism (1984)
- Natural Relations (1993)
- The Greening of Marxism (editor) (1996)
- Philosophy of Social Science (2001)
- The Butterflies of Colchester and North East Essex (2002)
- The Easy Butterfly Guide: Britain and Europe (2006)
- The Sage Handbook of Environment and Society (2007)
- Nature, Social Relations and Human Needs (2009)
- Grasshoppers and Crickets, Collins New Naturalist (2012)
- Alfred Russel Wallace: Explorer, Evolutionist, Public Intellectual (2013)
- A Naturalist's Guide to the Butterflies of Great Britain and Northern Europe (2017)
- Solitary Bees (2017)
- Solitary Bees, Collins New Naturalist (2023) with Nick Owens

== Awards ==
- Stamford Raffles Award
