= Philip S. Corbet =

British entomologist (1929–2008)

Philip Steven Corbet
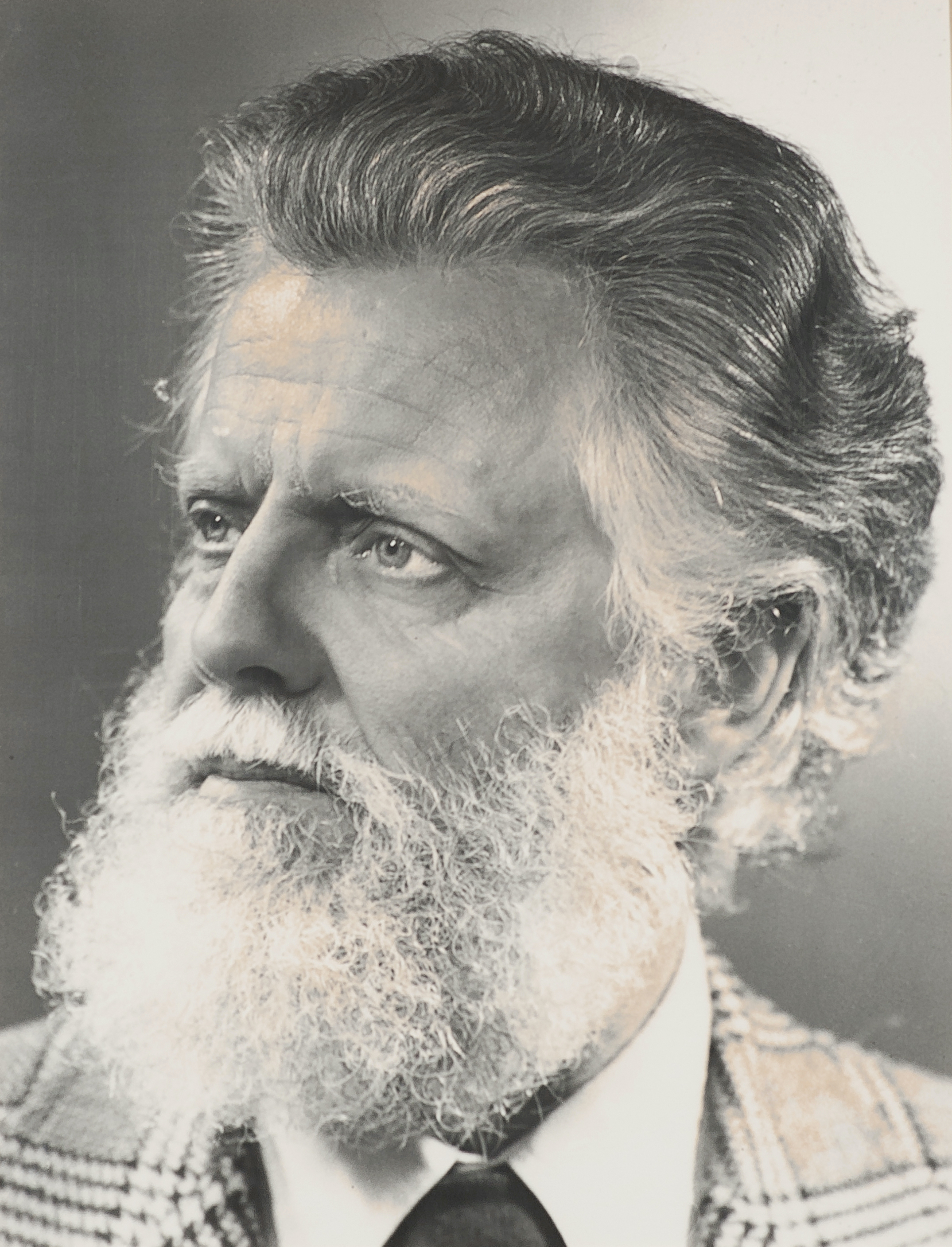
- Born: 21 May 1929
- Died: 13 February 2008 (aged 78)
- Education: University of Cambridge
- Children: 1

Philip Steven Corbet FRSE (21 May 1929 – 13 February 2008) was a British entomologist whose work focused largely on aquatic insects and dragonflies. He co-authored and authored several books on the subject, which established him as a world expert on the order Odonata. He is also noted for his interest in biological controls as a substitute for synthetic pesticides in agriculture.

== Biography ==
Born in Kuala Lumpur, where his father Alexander Steven Corbet was a microbiologist at the Rubber Research Institute, Corbet was educated at Nelson College in New Zealand from 1940 to 1945 and then for a year at Dauntsey's School in Wiltshire. He went on to study zoology at the University of Reading before completing his doctoral studies at the University of Cambridge in 1953.

Corbet was employed as an entomologist and zoologist by the East African High Commission in Uganda between 1954 and 1962. Initially he worked at the East African Freshwater Fisheries Research Organization in Jinja and then, from 1957, at the East African Virus Research Institute at Entebbe. He then moved to Canada where he worked at the Entomology Research Institute in Ottawa, before becoming director of the Canada Department of Agriculture Research Institute at Belleville, Ontario, in 1967. Four years later he was appointed professor of biology at the University of Waterloo. In 1974 he returned to New Zealand, taking up the position of professor and director of the Joint Centre for Environmental Science at the University of Canterbury and Lincoln Agricultural College. In 1978 he became chair of the zoology department at the University of Canterbury, and two years later he was appointed professor of zoology at the University of Dundee, where he remained until his retirement in 1990.

Corbet continued to conduct entomological research at the University of Edinburgh, where he appointed an honorary professor in 1996. The same year he retired to Cornwall, where he continued writing and served on the Cornwall Wildlife Trust. He died at Truro following a heart attack in 2008.

In Canada, Corbet investigated methods of pest suppression that reduced or eliminated the need for synthetic chemical pesticides, and led the team that suppressed the populations of biting insects that threatened Expo 67 in Montreal. Corbet authored or co-authored numerous publications, including the books Dragonflies: behaviour and ecology of Odonata (1960, expanded and updated in 1999) and A Biology of Dragonflies (1962).
