= Richard Lewington =

British artist

- Born: 1951
- Occupation: Painter, illustrator
- Awards: Stamford Raffles Award (2010)
- Website: www.richardlewington.co.uk

Richard Lewington (born 1951) is a British wildlife artist renowned for his exquisite eye for detail, especially with lepidoptera.

== Biography ==
Born in 1951, Richard Lewington resides and works in Oxfordshire, England. Lewington's father and grandfather were both countrymen that kept extensive collections of insects, and they were especially interested in butterflies. Lewington has commented that he believes that this is where his interest in wildlife began. As a boy, Lewington used to draw birds but once he graduated from college in the early 1970s, he began illustrating insects. He has a younger brother, Ian Lewington, who is a successful bird artist.

== Education ==
Richard Lewington attended Berkshire College of Art and Design where he received his education.

== Career ==
Richard Lewington is a freelance illustrator who specializes in illustrating wildlife, but more specifically he illustrates a larger amount of insects and invertebrates. He has made a comment that states that there is no greater diversity of a subject to illustrate because there is an infinite range of shapes, colours and textures. Lewington occasionally paints vertebrates, mammals, amphibians, reptiles, and birds. He has also been involved in an app that was being developed that allowed the user to view different kinds of British bumblebees, and his job was to illustrate all the different bumblebees. He is recorded to attend the British Birdwatching Fair at Rutland Water in August each year. Lewington has been able to be successful due to his various skills in observing, being a miniaturist, and having knowledge in his subject matter. He has also been able to illustrate a variety of children's books.

== Success ==
In 2012 Lewington won a commission to paint ten butterfly images for a set of first-class postage stamps for Royal Mail, which were available from 11 July 2013.

He designed a further set of six Royal Mail postage stamps, released in October 2020, featuring insects.

== Work ==
Richard Lewington's work and illustrations appear in the following works:

- The Moths and Butterflies of Great Britain and Ireland
- Pocket Guide to the Butterflies of Great Britain and Ireland
- The Butterflies of Britain and Ireland; Guide to Garden Wildlife
- Field Guide to the Dragonflies and Damselflies of Great Britain and Ireland
- Field Guide to the Dragonflies of Britain and Europe
- Field Guide to the Moths of Great Britain and Ireland
- Field Guide to the Micro-Moths of Great Britain and Ireland
- Concise Guide to the Moths of Great Britain and Ireland
- A Guide to House and Garden Spiders
- Guide to the Butterflies of Britain (Field Studies Council Occasional Publications)
- A Guide to the Day-flying Moths of Britain (Folding chart)
- Collins British Butterfly Guide (Collins Pocket Guide)
- The Natural History of Oak Tree
- Mitchell Beazley Pocket Guide to Butterflies
- Essential Entomology: An Order-by-Order Introduction
- Collins Butterfly Guide
- The Most Complete Guide to the Butterflies of Britain and Europe (Collins Guides)
- How to Identify - Butterflies
- Guide des papillons d'Europe et d'Afrique du Nord : 440 espèces illustrées en 2000 dessins en couleurs
- Collins Field Guide - Butterflies of Britain and Europe
- Collins Butterfly Guide
- The Most Complete Field Guide to the Butterflies of Britain and Europe
- The Moths and Butterflies of Great Britain and Ireland: Oecophoridae to Scythrididae v. 4, Pts. 1 & 2
- The Moths and Butterflies of Great Britain and Ireland: Lasiocampidae to Thyatiridae v. 7, Pt. 2
- The Moths and Butterflies of Great Britain and Ireland: Yponomeutidae to Elachistidae v. 3
- Guide to Insects of the British Isles
- Insects of the Northern Hemisphere
- Butterfly Watching
- Insects of the Falkland Islands
- Insects: American Nature Guides
- The Pocket Guide to Insects of the Northern Hemisphere
- Insects of Great Britain and Europe (Junior Nature Guides)
- Guide des papillons d'Europe et d'Afrique du Nord : 440 espèces illustrées en 2000 dessins en couleur
- Die Tagfalter Europas und Nordwestafrikas
- A Guide to Caterpillars of the Butterflies of Britain and Ireland
- Beknopte veldgids Nachtvlinders: alle soorten van Nederland en België
- Tous les papillons de France et d'Europe
- Guide des libellules : De France et d'Europe
- De Nieuwe vlindergids
