= The Evolution of Melanism =

1973 book by Bernard Kettlewell

The Evolution of Melanism: a study of recurring necessity; with special reference to industrial melanism in the Lepidoptera
- Author: Bernard Kettlewell
- Language: English
- Genre: Non-fiction
- Publisher: Clarendon Press
- Publication date: 1973
- ISBN: 0-19-857370-7

The Evolution of Melanism: a study of recurring necessity; with special reference to industrial melanism in the Lepidoptera is a 1973 science book by the lepidopterist Bernard Kettlewell.

The book includes Kettlewell's original papers in the journal Heredity on his classic predation experiments on the peppered moth. It also covers Kettlewell's experiments in Shetland on other Lepidoptera (moths and butterflies).

The book is centered on the authors research of evolution of industrial melanism in peppered moths. It does not goes much in-depth about the evolution of melanism in other species as the title might suggest. The book introduces the reader with a 50-page long chapter about melanism. Then, the book goes in-depth about industrial melanism. Finally, the peppered moth Biston betularia is discussed in all its known details of that time. Knowledge of the genetics of the melanistic forms of the moths, the knowledge of the predation by birds and the knowledge of blackening of the environment in the English midlands is discussed and used for Kettlewell's most important experiments on natural selection. This is also the climax of the book, namely the details and outcomes of his own experiments on natural selection. Kettlewell also shows other cases, such as his experiments in the Shetland Islands with Lasiocampa quercus (‘Recessive melanic plymorphisms’) and Amanthes glareosa (‘Northern melanism’) (Kettlewell et al., 1969). However, these lack knowledge compared to the Biston experiments. Therefore, they are mostly seem as secondary importance. However, according to Carson (1974), “they play an important role in showing that manifold genetic melanisms can exist apart from those that have evolved as a genetic response to industrial pollution”. The conclusion of the book discusses several melanisms, such as polymorphism.

== Importance of the book ==
The experiments with the peppered moths, as described in this book, are arguably the most dramatic and best known case of adaptive evolution. For many people at that time, this was the first evidence that they could see evolution taking place in the world around them, and could see how fast evolution can go since Darwin came up with the hypothesis (Kettlewell, 1959). In today's biology books on primary schools and even in university books, this is still one of the most common example of adaptive evolution according to Carson (1974). It also led to more studies to industrial melanism in other species and places at that time but also currently. After his papers were published in the late 1950s (from which his book mostly consists of), there was an increase in studies. These included two-spot ladybirds (Adalia bipuncta) in the U.K. (Creed, 1970) and some Lepidoptera from North America (Owen, 1961). More recent studies were conducted on seasnakes (Emydocephalus annulatus) in New Caledonia (Goiran et al., 2017).

== Criticism ==
Most of the information depicted in the book was already published before and it followed the presentation of Kettlewell's papers. He has altered many figures and tables slightly compered to the originals which were mostly published in the journal Heredity. It was therefore criticised that this book was more a compilation of Kettlewell's work instead of a synthesis (Carson, 1974). Furthermore, some of the black-and-white photographs were of better quality in the journals than in the book.

The entomologist and geneticist Michael Majerus reviewed this in his 1998 book Melanism: Evolution in Action, and compared it with more recent studies which did not support some of Kettlewell's conclusions. He called for more research, and in 2001 began extended experiments. In 2002, Judith Hooper wrote a book about Kettlewell, Of Moths and Men, accusing Kettlewell of fraudulent data. Majerus concluded his research in 2007, with results which he described as a complete vindication of the natural selection theory of peppered moth evolution, answering the various questions which had been raised.

== See also ==
- Industrial melanism
- Peppered moth evolution
- Kettlewell's experiment
