= J. W. Tutt =

English schoolteacher and entomologist

James William Tutt
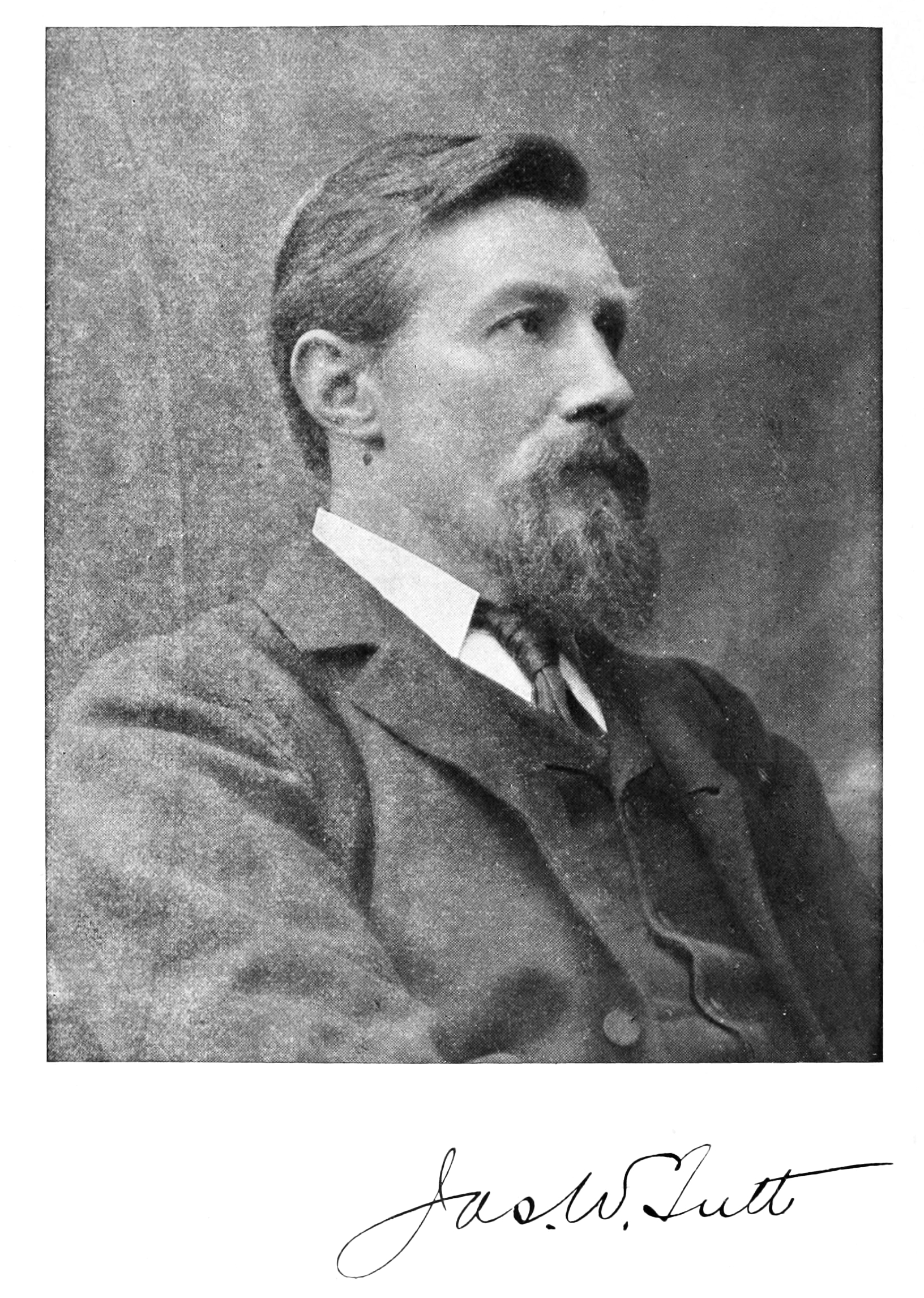
- Born: 26 April 1858; Kent, England
- Died: 10 January 1911 (aged 52); Westcombe, England
- Education: University of London
- Known for: Peppered moth evolution
- Spouse: Frances Marsh (née Collins)
- Children: 4
- Scientific career
- Fields: Entomology
- Workplaces: Snowfields Board School; Webb Street School; Higher Grade Central School

James William Tutt (26 April 1858–10 January 1911) was an English schoolteacher and entomologist. He is best remembered for originating the understanding of industrial melanism, phenomenon of darkening in insects and other animals due to long-term exposure to industrial pollution, based on Charles Darwin's theory of natural selection.

Tutt was a founding editor of the journal Entomologists' Record from 1890 and published a landmark series on the British Lepidoptera in which he described numerous species of moths and was among the first to analyse melanism in the pepper moth Biston betularia and was among the first to provide a clear explanation of their increasing frequency based on the role of crypsis, natural selection by predators, and the effect of changed environmental conditions brought on by industrialism.

== Life and career ==
Tutt was born in Strood, Kent and went to the St. Nicholas Schools from 1865 to 1875. He entered St. Mark's Training College, Chelsea in 1876. He matriculated in First Class from the University of London. He became a headmaster at Snowfields Board School followed by Webb Street School and Higher Grade School in Portman Place. In 1910, he was invited to become headmaster at the new Higher Grade Central School in London. Tutt was interested in insects from the age of thirteen but became more scientific after meeting lepidopterist George Coverdale in 1881. A major contribution was his explanation of melanism that he noted in several insects including the famed pepper moth. He noted this in Yorkshire and provided a selectionist (based on Darwinian natural selection) explanation synthesized from ideas proposed by contemporaries including Buchanan White and Nicholas Cooke.

Tutt was active in London scientific societies. In 1885, Tutt was elected member of the Royal Entomological Society as well as the South London Entomological and Natural History Society (later renamed the British Entomological and Natural History Society). Since 1897, he became a council member of the Royal Entomological Society. He was the vice president in 1895 and was the president-nominate in 1910; but did not hold the office as he died a few days later. Between 1896 and 1899, he was president of the City of London Entomological and Natural History Society (predecessor of London Natural History Society). In 1899, he became president of the South London Entomological and Natural History Society.

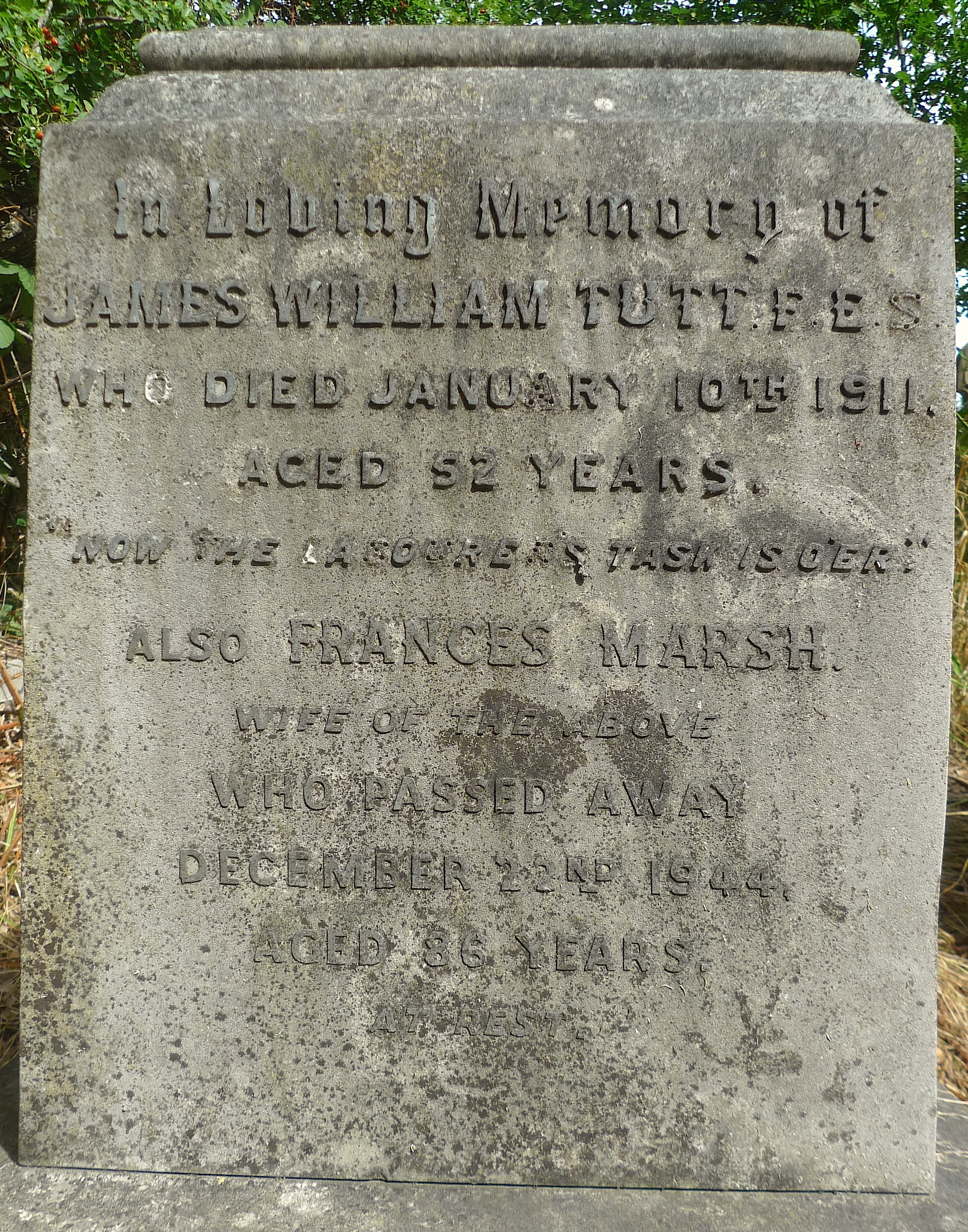

Tutt was a keen popularizer, giving talks to the public on many occasions, and a listener of one was inspired to contribute a poem to Punch magazine:

Mr Tutt, who tells no lies,
Tells us that the butterflies
Are alas, what do you think?
Let me whisper, fond of drink!
He has watched them on the flow’rs
Where they’ll sit and suck for hours,
Quite devoid of any motion
Save absorption of the ’lotion.
Thus they spend the summer’s day
While the females work away,
For this craving to regale
Is restricted to the male.
Lost illusion of our youth
In a scientific truth,
Tear drops gather in our eyes
When we think of butterflies.

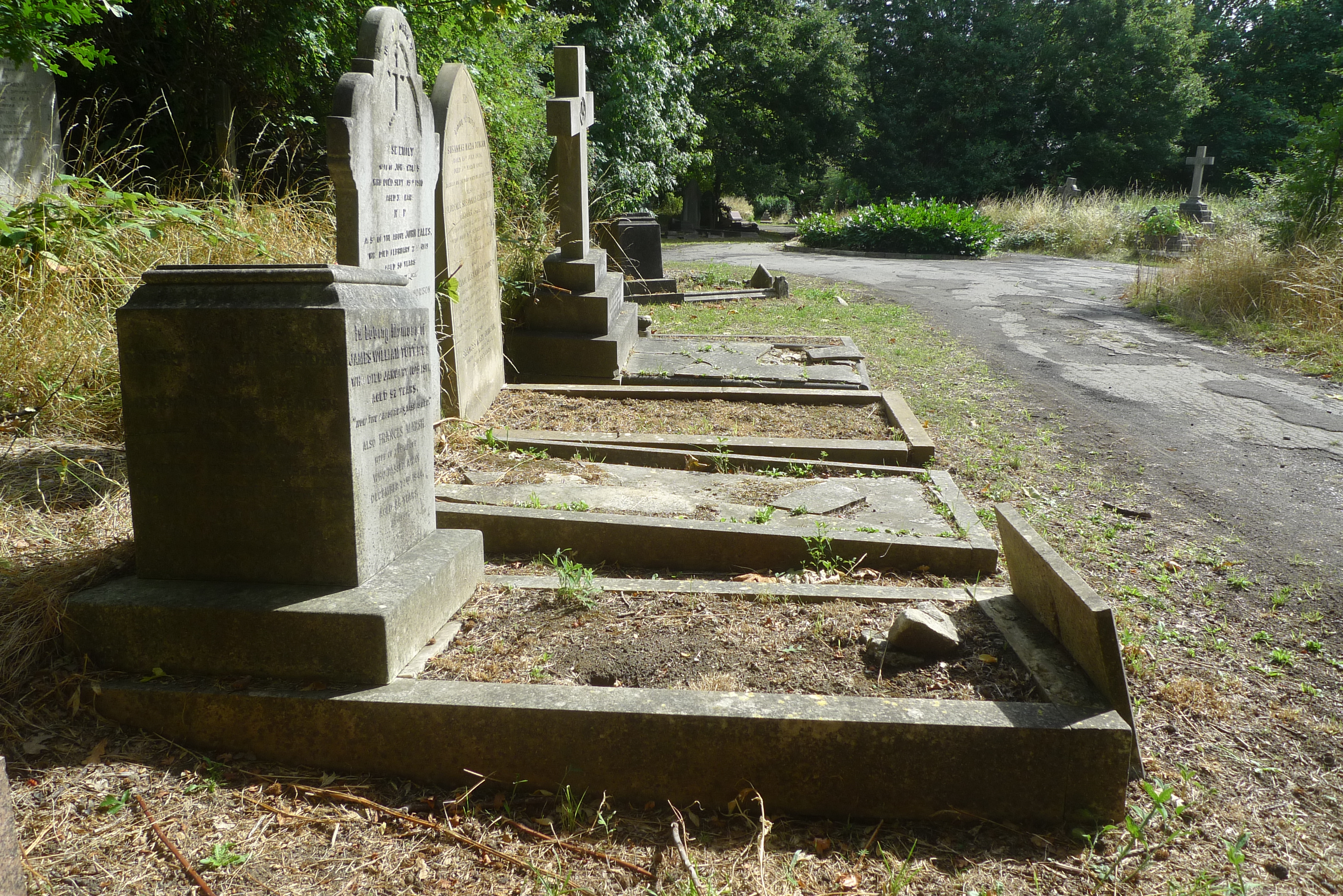

Tutt had a congenital heart condition but lived without much trouble. He died at his home in Rayleigh Villa, Westcombe Hill. He was buried at Lewisham Cemetery now renamed Ladywell Cemetery of borough of Lewisham's twinned 'Brockley & Ladywell Cemeteries'. He was survived by his wife Frances Marsh (née Collins), two sons and three daughters.

== Contributions ==
His first scientific study was on the development of a moth, Eriogaster lanestris. He described how the pupa of the moth was more delayed that other species, which he reported in 1884 in the journal The Entomologists. The journal later described him as "the most frequent and voluminous contributor" and his contributions were growing so much that it inspired the editor and publisher Edward Newman to introduce a spin-off journal, Entomologists' Record and Journal of Variation. In 1890, he became editor of the journal, the task he continued till his death. His prolific writings inspired other naturalists which culminated in the birth of many new journals and magazines dedicated to natural science. During his career, he published about 900 articles and 20 books mostly on moths, and few on other insects.

=== Industrial melanism ===
Tutt is credited as the first scientist to explain the phenomenon of industrial melanism in terms of natural selection. Industrial Revolution started in England in the late 18th century. By the early 19th century, most of the industrial regions, particularly in western England, became heavily polluted due to extensive usage of coal. One of the most heavily polluted cities was ridden with black smokes, black rains and black snow that it was literally "jet-black" environment. Before the Industrial Revolution, insects were mostly light coloured. The most notable insect, the peppered moth (Biston betularia) was known to be white with patches of black spots. The first black specimen (of unknown origin) was collected before 1811, and kept in the University of Oxford. The first live specimen was caught by Robert Smith Edleston in Manchester, in 1848. Edleston continued to record the moth population and by 1864, he noted that the black had outnumbered the white moth population. By 1895, 98 per cent of peppered moth in Manchester was the black type, and the increasing black moth population was seen in different parts of England.

In 1890, Tutt analysed the records of insect studies since Edleston's report and found that the increasing number of black insects (peppered moth was not the only insect with increasing melanism) was related to the degree of pollution in industrial cities. At the time there were several and varied hypotheses on the insect melanism. Some scientists posited altitude differences as the cause, while some advocated humidity due to differential rainfall as the source. Nicholas Cooke in 1877 was the first to bring up the theory of natural selection and hypothesised that there was no natural selection but that the insects turned black due to exposure to black fumes in their larval stages. Buchanan White held the opposite view that natural selection could have a role and that black body was a form of protection.

Tutt took up White's view and explained that acquiring a black body was an adaptive advantage since the black individuals remained inconspicuous against the polluted walls and tree trunks where they rested. It would be hard for predators to notice them, whereas predators would have easily picked the light-coloured individuals. In 1891, he gave a full explanation in a book Melanism and Melanochroism in British Lepidoptera, writing:

If we add to these natural conditions [clean forest environment] the presence of chemical fumes, smokes, and other atmospheric impurities which are specially characteristic of large manufacturing districts, we can see how intensified the tendency to melanism would become in such districts. Only those insects that become positively black, would have in many places the slightest chance of escape, and "natural selection" by weeding out the paler specimens, would leave only the darker, and "hereditary tendency" would play its part in the intensification of the colour of the species.

Tutt went on to explain how industrial pollution could produced black environment and thus favoured insect melanism, taking specific example on the moths:

How does rain permanently darken the tree-trunks and other objects on which insects rest? It is well known to the most elementary student of chemistry that rainwater rarely occurs pure, and that in large towns the quantity of impurities is very great. The vast quantity of smoke, gases, fumes, etc., in manufacturing towns, brought down by rain, is scarcely credible, and it is from these impurities I consider the permanent darkening comes. When the water evaporates, the solid matter is left behind, and as a result, the impurities are left to darken the surfaces to which they have been carried by rainwater... [As an example] the intensity of Yorkshire and Lancashire melanism produced by humidity and smoke, is intensified by "natural selection" and "hereditary tendency." As example I would cite the species Amphidasys betularia [former name of Biston betularia, and included five other moths], which, occurring on trees, fences and similar objects would thus be affected.

Tutt did not explain how "protection" was key to the evolution of moths. In 1896, he gave the full scientific foundation for the adaptive benefits for black colouration specifically discussing the peppered moth. By then he knew that the main predators of moths were birds and that bird would easily picked and eat white moths in a polluted area, while they would remain quite safe in a clean lichen-covered trees. He wrote in British Moths :

In our woods in the south the trees are pale and the moth [white specimen] has a fair chance of escape, but put the Peppered Moth with its white ground colour on a black tree trunk, and what would happen? It would, as you say, be very inconspicuous, and would fall a prey to the first bird that spied it out. But some of these Peppered Moths have more black about them than others, and you can easily understand that the blacker they are the nearer they will be to the colour of the trunk of the tree, and the greater will become the difficulty of detecting them. So it really is; the paler ones the birds eat, the darker ones escape. But then if the parents are the darkest of their race, the children will tend to be like them, but inasmuch as the search by birds gets keener and keener, only the very blackest will be likely to escape. Year after year this has gone on, and the selection has been carried to such an extent by Nature that no real black and white Peppered Moths are found in these districts, but only the black kind.

Tutt's concept is known as "selective predation" or "differential predation" hypothesis. The hypothesis was experimentally demonstrated by Bernard Kettlewell during 1953–1956, known as the Kettlewell's experiment. From the experiment, peppered moth story became a "classic" and "textbook" example of natural selection in action. Kettlewell's experiment was further vidicated by Michael Majerus who performed the most elaborate zoological experiment during 2001–2007. Majerus's experiment was considered the ultimate proof of peppered moth evolution that "convincingly show that 'industrial melanism in the peppered moth is still one of the clearest and most easily understood examples of Darwinian evolution in action'."

=== Books ===
The major books written by Tutt include Melanism and Melanochroism in British Lepidoptera (1891), The British Noctuae and their Varieties (1891–92), Natural History of the British Lepidoptera (1890–1911, in ten and unfinished volumes), British Moths (1896), Practical Hints for the Field Lepidopterist (1901) and A Natural History of the British Lepidoptera: A Text-book for Students and Collectors (1908).
