= Peppered moth evolution =

Significance of the peppered moth in evolutionary biology

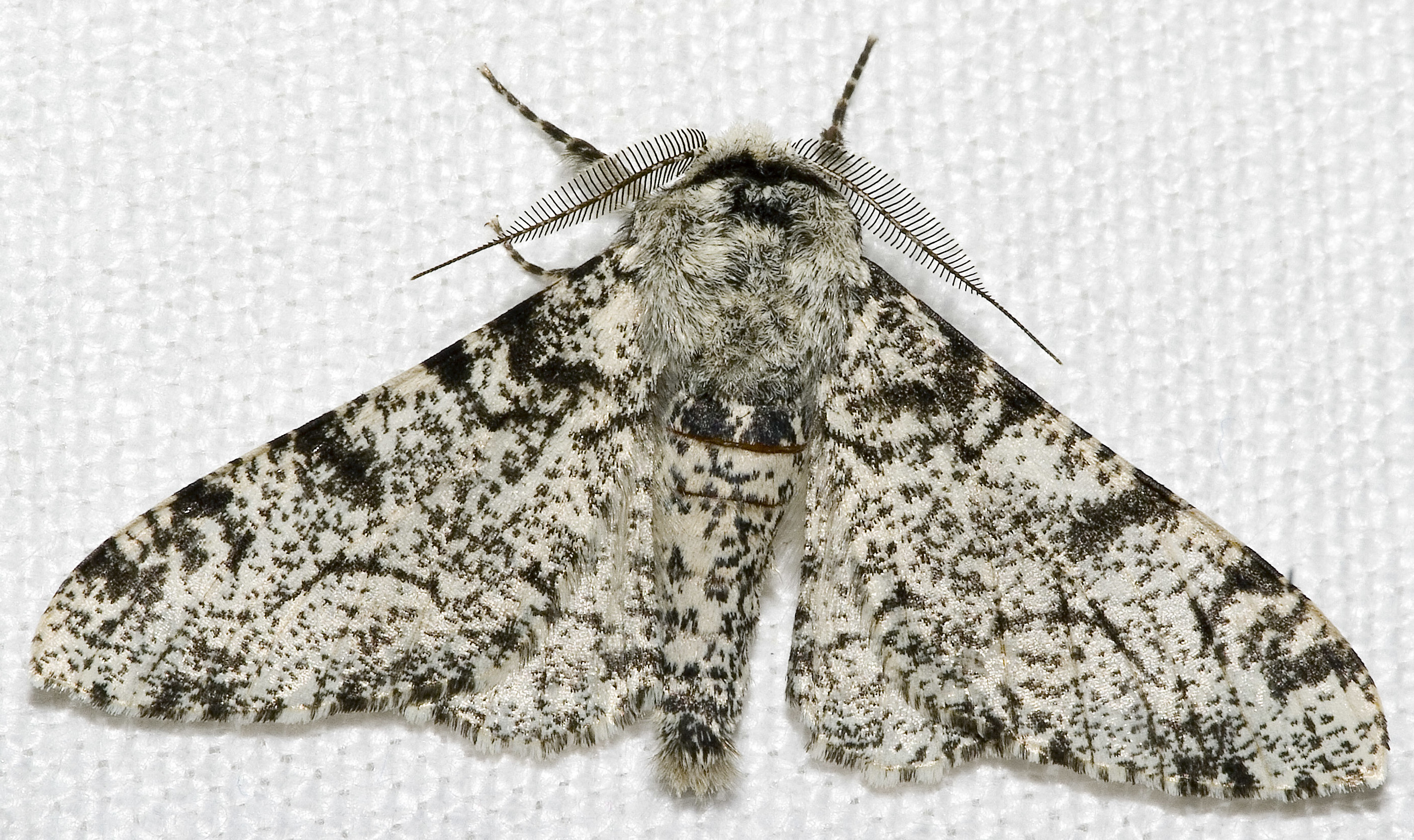
Biston betularia f. typica, the white-bodied peppered moth

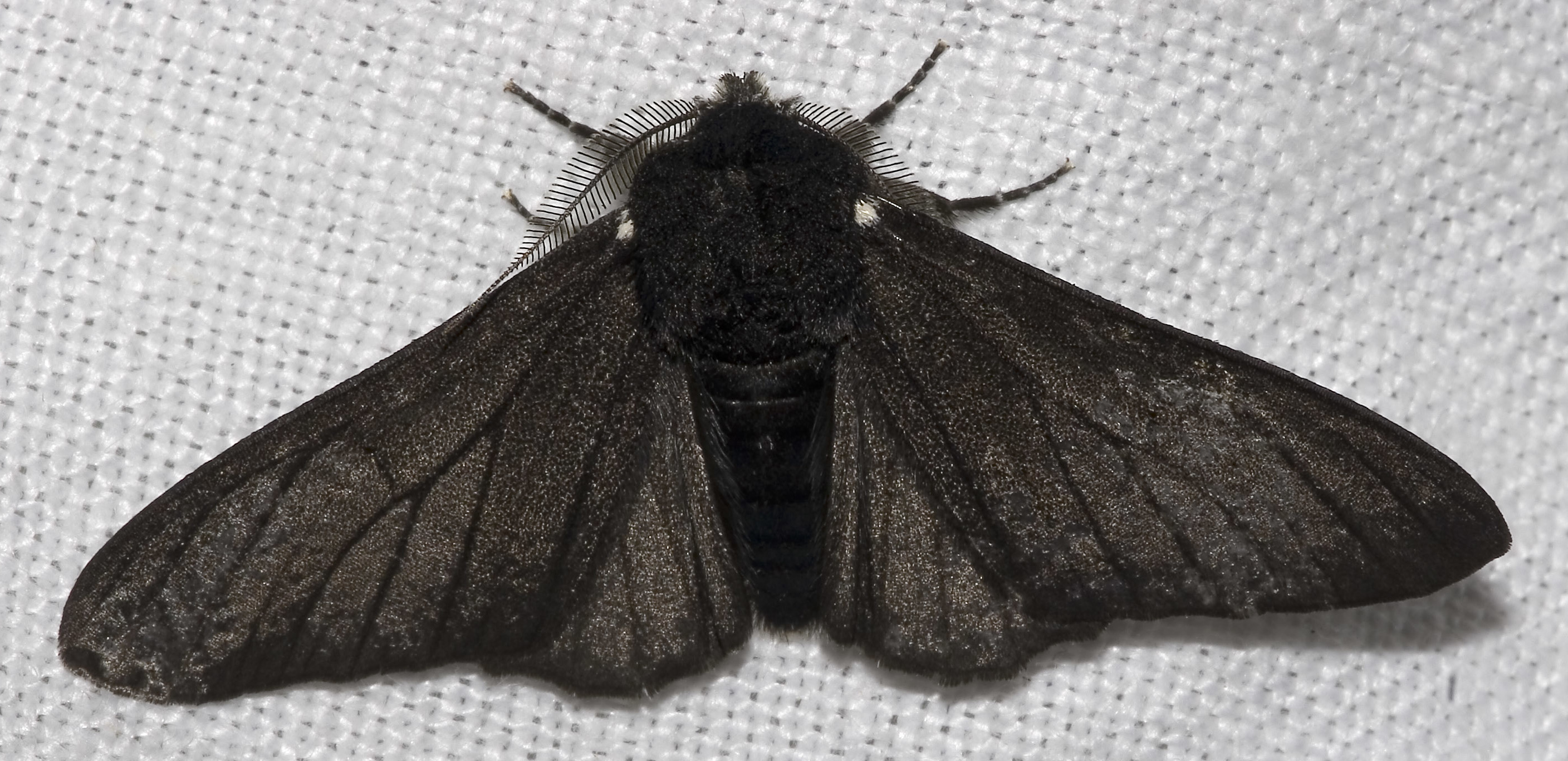
Biston betularia f. carbonaria, the black-bodied peppered moth

The evolution of the peppered moth is an evolutionary instance of directional colour change in the moth population as a consequence of air pollution during the Industrial Revolution in England in the 19th century. The frequency of dark-coloured moths increased at that time, an example of industrial melanism. Later, when pollution was reduced in response to clean air legislation, the light-coloured form again predominated. Industrial melanism in the peppered moth was an early test of Charles Darwin's natural selection in action, and it remains a classic example in the teaching of evolution. In 1978, Sewall Wright described it as "the clearest case in which a conspicuous evolutionary process has actually been observed."

The dark-coloured or melanic form of the peppered moth (var. carbonaria) was rare, though a specimen had been collected by 1811. After field collection in 1848 from Manchester, an industrial city in England, the frequency of the variety was found to have increased drastically. By the end of the 19th century it almost completely outnumbered the original light-coloured type (var. typica), with a record of 98% in 1895. The evolutionary importance of the moth was only speculated upon during Darwin's lifetime. It was 14 years after Darwin's death, in 1896, that J. W. Tutt presented it as a case of natural selection. Because of this, the idea spread widely, and more people came to believe in Darwin's theory.

Bernard Kettlewell was the first to investigate the evolutionary mechanism behind peppered moth adaptation, between 1953 and 1956. He found that a light-coloured body was an effective camouflage in a clean environment, such as in rural Dorset, while the dark colour was beneficial in a polluted environment like industrial Birmingham. This selective survival was due to birds, which easily caught dark moths on clean trees and white moths on trees darkened with soot. The story, supported by Kettlewell's experiment, became the canonical example of Darwinian evolution and evidence for natural selection used in standard textbooks.

However, failure to replicate the experiment and Theodore David Sargent's criticism of Kettlewell's methods in the late 1960s led to general skepticism. When Judith Hooper's Of Moths and Men was published in 2002, Kettlewell's story was more sternly attacked, and accused of fraud. The criticism became a major argument for creationists. Michael Majerus was the principal defender of Kettlewell's original experiment. His seven-year experiment beginning in 2001, the most elaborate of its kind in population biology, the results of which were published posthumously in 2012, vindicated Kettlewell's work in great detail. This restored peppered moth evolution as "the most direct evidence [of evolution]", and "one of the clearest and most easily understood examples of Darwinian evolution in action".

== Origin and evolution ==
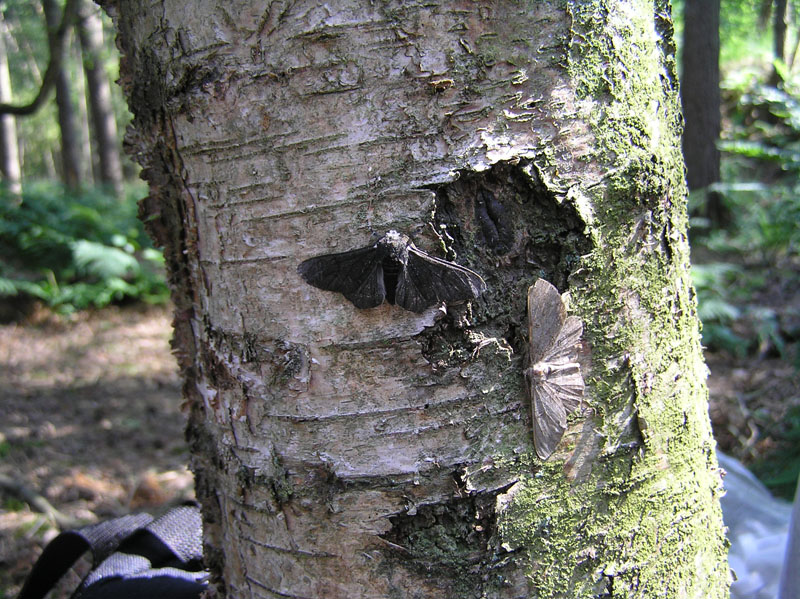
Typica and carbonaria morphs on the same tree. The light-coloured typica (below the bark's scar) is nearly invisible on this pollution-free tree, camouflaging it from predators.

Before the Industrial Revolution, the black form of the peppered moth was rare. The first black specimen (of unknown origin) was collected before 1811, and kept in the University of Oxford. The first live specimen was caught by R. S. Edleston in Manchester, England in 1848, but he reported this only 16 years later in 1864, in The Entomologist. Edleston notes that by 1864 it was the more common type of moth in his garden in Manchester. The light-bodied moths were able to blend in with the light-coloured lichens and tree bark, and the less common black moths were more likely to be eaten by birds. As a result of the common light-coloured lichens and English trees, therefore, the light-coloured moths were much more effective at hiding from predators, and the frequency of the dark allele was very low, at about 0.01%.

During the early decades of the Industrial Revolution in England, the countryside between London and Manchester became blanketed with soot from the new coal-burning factories. Many of the light-bodied lichens died from sulphur dioxide emissions, and the trees became darkened. This led to an increase in bird predation for light-coloured moths, as they no longer blended in as well in their polluted ecosystem: indeed, their bodies now dramatically contrasted with the colour of the bark. Dark-coloured moths, on the other hand, were camouflaged very well by the blackened trees. The population of dark-coloured moth rapidly increased. By the mid-19th century, the number of dark-coloured moths had risen noticeably, and by 1895, the percentage of dark-coloured moths in Manchester was reported at 98%, a dramatic change (of almost 100 times) from the original frequency. This effect of industrialization in body colour led to the coining of the term "industrial melanism".

The implication that industrial melanism could be evidence supporting Charles Darwin's theory of natural selection was noticed during his lifetime. Albert Brydges Farn (1841–1921), a British entomologist, wrote to Darwin on 18 November 1878 to discuss his observation of colour variations in the Annulet moth (then Gnophos obscurata, now Charissa obscurata). He noted the existence of dark moths in peat in the New Forest, brown moths on clay and red soil in Herefordshire, and white moths on chalk cliffs in Lewes, and suggested that this variation was an example of "survival of the fittest". He told Darwin that he had found dark moths on a chalk slope where the foliage had been blackened by smoke from lime kilns, and he had also heard that white moths had become less common at Lewes after lime kilns had been in operation for a few years. Darwin does not seem to have responded to this information, possibly because he thought natural selection would be a much slower process. A scientific explanation of moth coloration was only published in 1896, 14 years after Darwin's death, when J. W. Tutt explicitly linked peppered moth melanism to natural selection.

=== Rise and fall of phenotype frequency ===
Melanism has been observed in both European and North American peppered moth populations. Information about the rise in frequency is scarce. Much more is known about the subsequent fall in phenotype frequency, as it has been measured by lepidopterists using moth traps.

Steward compiled data for the first recordings of the peppered moth by locality, and deduced that the carbonaria morph was the result of a single mutation that subsequently spread. By 1895, it had reached a reported frequency of 98% in Manchester.

From around 1962 to the present, the phenotype frequency of carbonaria has steadily fallen in line with cleaner air around industrial cities. Its decline has been measured more accurately than its rise, through more rigorous scientific studies. Notably, Kettlewell conducted a national survey in 1956, Bruce Grant conducted a similar one in early 1996, and L.M. Cook in 2003.

Similar results were found in North America. Melanic forms have not been found in Japan. It is believed that this is because peppered moths in Japan do not inhabit industrialised regions.

== Genetics ==
Tutt was the first to propose the "differential bird predation hypothesis" in 1896, as a mechanism of natural selection. The melanic morphs were better camouflaged against the bark of trees without foliose lichen, whereas the typica morphs were better camouflaged against trees with lichens. As a result, birds would find and eat those morphs that were not camouflaged with increased frequency.

In 1924, J.B.S. Haldane calculated, using a simple general selection model, the selective advantage necessary for the recorded natural evolution of peppered moths, based on the assumption that in 1848 the frequency of dark-coloured moths was 2%, and by 1895 it was 95%. The dark-coloured, or melanic, form would have had to be 50% more fit than the typical, light-coloured form. Even taking into consideration possible errors in the model, this reasonably excluded the stochastic process of genetic drift, because the changes were too fast. Haldane's statistical analysis of selection for the melanic variant in peppered moths became a well known part of his effort to demonstrate that mathematical models that combined natural selection with Mendelian genetics could explain evolution – an effort that played a key role in the foundation of the discipline of population genetics, and the beginnings of the modern synthesis of evolutionary theory with genetics.

The peppered moth Biston betularia is also a model of parallel evolution in the incidence of melanism in the British form (f. carbonaria) and the American form (f. swettaria) as they are indistinguishable in appearance. Genetic analysis indicates that both phenotypes are inherited as autosomal dominants. Cross hybridizations indicate that the phenotypes are produced by alleles at a single locus.

The gene for carbonaria in B. betularia was thought to be in a region of chromosome 17. It was later concluded that the gene could not be in that region, because none of the genes in the chromosome coded for either wing pattern or melanisation. The region that was used to find it was the first intron of the orthologue of the cortex gene in Drosophila. Through elimination of candidates within the region based on rarity, a 21,925 base pair insert remained. The insert, labelled carb-TE, is a class II transposable element that has an approximately 9-kb non-repetitive sequence tandemly repeated two and one third times. There are 6 base pairs of inverted repeats and duplicated 4 base pairs at the target site not present in typica moths. Carb-TE has higher expression during the stage of rapid wing disc morphogenesis. The mechanism of how the gene increases expression, and whether it is the only gene involved, is still not known.

== Alternative hypotheses ==
Several alternative hypotheses to natural selection as the driving force of evolution were proposed during the 1920s and 1930s. Random mutation, migration, and genetic drift were also seen as major forces of evolution.

P. A. Riley proposed an additional selective factor, where heavy metal chelation by melanin would supposedly protect peppered moths against the toxic effects of heavy metals associated with industrialisation. This selective advantage would supplement the major selective mechanism of differential bird predation.

=== Phenotypic induction ===
In 1920, John William Heslop-Harrison rejected Tutt's differential bird predation hypothesis, on the basis that he did not believe that birds ate moths. Instead he proposed that pollutants could cause changes to the soma and germ plasm of the organism. In 1925, K. Hasebroek made an early attempt to prove this hypothesis, exposing pupae to pollutant gases, namely hydrogen sulfide (H_{2}S), ammonia (NH_{3}), and "pyredin". He used eight species in his studies, four of which were species of butterfly that did not exhibit melanism.

In 1926 and 1928, Heslop-Harrison suggested that the increase of melanic moths in industrialised regions was due to "mutation pressure", not to selection by predators which he regarded as negligible. Salts of lead and manganese were present in the airborne pollutant particles, and he suggested that these caused the mutation of genes for melanin production but of no others. He used Selenia bilunaria and Tephrosia bistortata as material. The larvae were fed with leaves that had incorporated these salts: melanics subsequently appeared. A similar experiment in 1932 by McKenney Hughes failed to replicate these results; the statistician and geneticist Ronald Fisher showed that Heslop-Harrison's controls were inadequate, and that Hughes's findings made the 6% mutation rate required by Heslop-Harrison "improbable".

== Kettlewell's experiment ==
The first important experiments on the peppered moth were carried out by Bernard Kettlewell at Oxford University, under the supervision of E. B. Ford, who helped him gain a grant from the Nuffield Foundation to perform the experiments. In 1953, Kettlewell started a preliminary experiment in which moths were released into a large (18m × 6m) aviary, where they were fed on by great tits (Parus major). His main experiment, at Christopher Cadbury Wetland Reserve in Birmingham, England, involved marking, releasing, and recapturing marked moths. He found that in this polluted woodland typica moths were preferentially preyed upon. He thus showed that the melanic phenotype was important to the survival of peppered moths in such a habitat. Kettlewell repeated the experiment in 1955 in unpolluted woodlands in Dorset, and again in the polluted woods in Birmingham. In 1956 he repeated the experiments and found similar results; in Birmingham, birds ate most of the white moths (75%), whereas in Dorset, most of the dark moths (86%) were eaten.

=== Criticisms ===
Theodore David Sargent (Note: Sargent (1936–2018) was a biologist at the University of Massachusetts Amherst.) performed experiments between 1965 and 1969, from which he concluded that it was not possible to reproduce Kettlewell's results, and said that birds showed no preference for moths on either black or white tree trunks. He suggested that Kettlewell had trained the birds to pick moths on tree trunks to obtain the desired results.

Two chapters in Michael Majerus's 1998 book Melanism: Evolution in Action critiqued the research in Kettlewell's The Evolution of Melanism, discussed studies which raised questions about Kettlewell's original experimental methods, and called for further research. Reviewing the book, Jerry Coyne noted these points, and concluded that "for the time being we must discard Biston as a well-understood example of natural selection in action, although it is clearly a case of evolution. There are many studies more appropriate for use in the classroom."

Judith Hooper's book Of Moths and Men (2002) severely criticised Kettlewell's experiment. Hooper argued that Kettlewell's field notes could not be found and suggested that his experiment was fraudulent, on the basis of Sargent's criticisms alleging that the photographs of the moths were taken of dead moths placed on a log. She said that E. B. Ford was a "Darwinian zealot", and claimed that he exploited the scientifically naive Kettlewell to obtain the desired experimental results. The book's reception led to demands that the peppered moth evolution story be deleted from textbooks. Scientists have examined the allegations made by Hooper, and found them to be without merit.

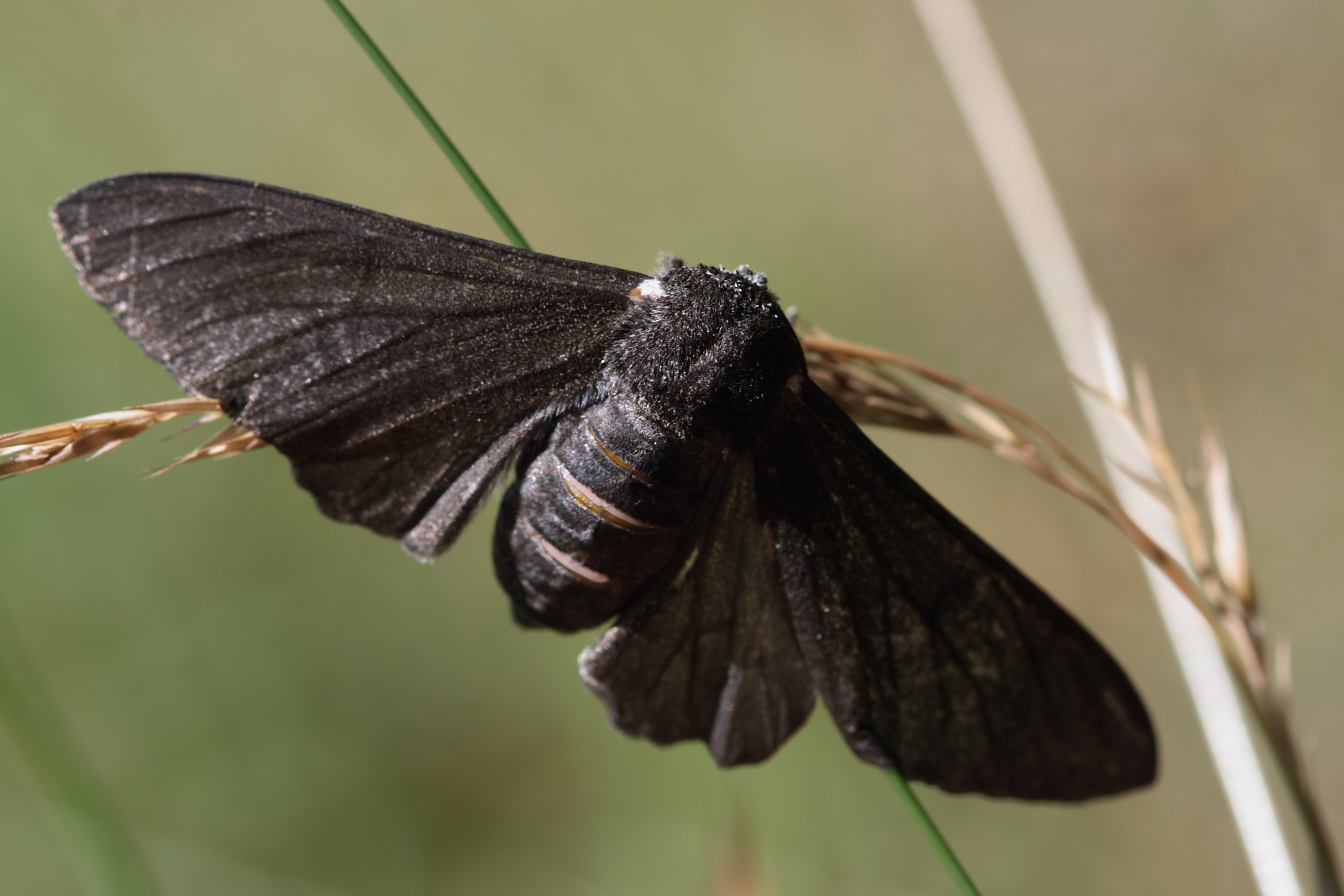
Creationists have disputed the occurrence or significance of the melanic carbonaria morph's increase in frequency.

Phillip E. Johnson, a co-founder of the creationist intelligent design movement, said that the moths "do not sit on tree trunks", that "moths had to be glued to the trunks" for pictures, and that the experiments were "fraudulent" and a "scam." The intelligent design advocate Jonathan Wells wrote an essay on the subject, a shortened version of which appeared in the 24 May 1999 issue of The Scientist, claiming that "The fact that peppered moths do not normally rest on tree trunks invalidates Kettlewell's experiments". Wells further wrote in his 2000 book Icons of Evolution that "What the textbooks don't explain, however, is that biologists have known since the 1980s that the classical story has some serious flaws. The most serious is that peppered moths in the wild don't even rest on tree trunks. The textbook photographs, it turns out, have been staged." However, peppered moths do rest on tree trunks on occasion, and Nick Matzke states that there is little difference between the 'staged' photos and 'unstaged' ones.

== Majerus's experiment ==
From 2001 to 2007, Majerus carried out experiments in Cambridge to resolve the various criticisms of Kettlewell's experiment. During his experiment, he noted the natural resting positions of peppered moths. Of the 135 moths examined, over half were on tree branches, mostly on the lower half of the branch; 37% were on tree trunks, mostly on the north side; and only 12.6% were resting on or under twigs. Following correspondence with Hooper, he added an experiment to find if bats, not birds, could be the main predators. He observed a number of species of bird actually preying on the moths, and found that differential bird predation was a major factor responsible for the decline in carbonaria frequency compared to typica. He described his results as a complete vindication of the natural selection theory of peppered moth evolution, and said "If the rise and fall of the peppered moth is one of the most visually impacting and easily understood examples of Darwinian evolution in action, it should be taught. It provides after all the proof of evolution."

Majerus died before he could complete the writing up of his experiments, so the work was carried on by Cook, Grant, Saccheri, and James Mallet, and published on 8 February 2012 as "Selective bird predation on the peppered moth: the last experiment of Michael Majerus." The experiment became the largest ever in the study of industrial melanism, involving 4,864 individuals in a six-year investigation, and it confirmed that melanism in moths is a genuine example of natural selection involving camouflage and predation. Their concluding remark runs: "These data provide the most direct evidence yet to implicate camouflage and bird predation as the overriding explanation for the rise and fall of melanism in moths."

Coyne said he was "delighted to agree with this conclusion [of Majerus's experiment], which answers my previous criticisms about the Biston story."

== See also ==
- Polymorphism
- Scottish red deer
