= Kettlewell's experiment =

Biological experiment on the peppered moth

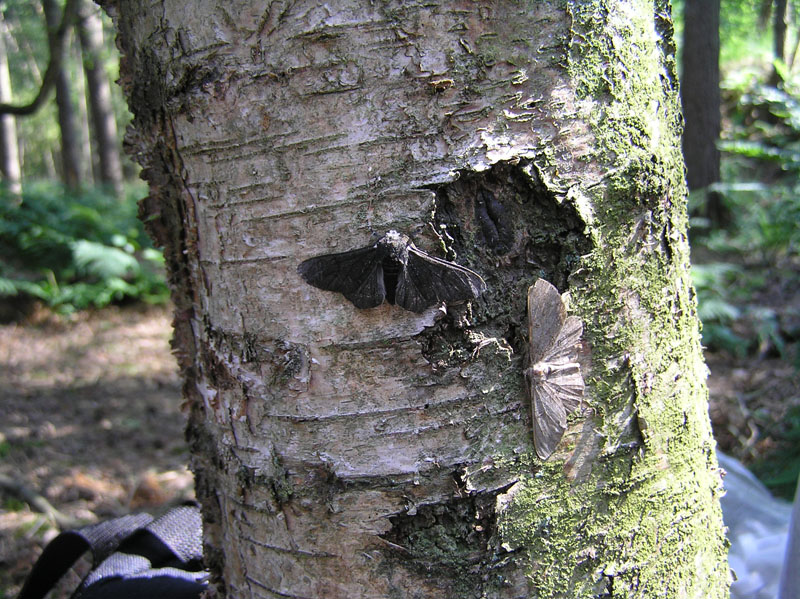
Peppered moth, carbonaria type on the left, and typica on the right

Kettlewell's experiment was a biological experiment in the mid-1950s to study the evolutionary mechanism of industrial melanism in the peppered moth (Biston betularia). It was executed by Bernard Kettlewell, working as a research fellow in the Department of Zoology, University of Oxford. He was investigating the cause of the appearance of dark-coloured moths since the Industrial Revolution in England in the 19th century. He conducted his first experiment in 1953 in the polluted woodland of Birmingham, and his second experiment in 1955 in Birmingham as well as in the clean woods of Dorset.

The experiment found that birds selectively prey on peppered moths depending on their body colour in relation to their environmental background. Thus, the evolution of a dark-coloured body provided a survival advantage in a polluted locality. The study concluded that "industrial melanism in moths is the most striking evolutionary phenomenon ever actually witnessed in any organism, animal or plant." It is now regarded as the classic demonstration of Charles Darwin's natural selection in action and one of the most beautiful experiments in evolutionary biology.

== Background ==
The Industrial Revolution in Great Britain caused extensive pollution, and industrial cities such as Manchester and Birmingham were covered with black soot. R.S. Edleston was the first to identify the unusual black peppered moth in 1848 in Manchester. By the end of the century, it was recorded that the black moth, the carbonaria type, outnumbered (90% in some regions) the natural white ones, named typica. There were conflicting ideas as to the biological basis of this industrial melanism. Humidity, environment, heredity, disease, temperature and protection (such as camouflage) were the factors put forward. J. W. Tutt was the first to come up with natural selection as an explanation, and stated in 1896 that the phenomenon was due to selective predation by birds. With the rise of evolutionary statistics, the theoretical background was set. For example, J.B.S. Haldane estimated in 1924 the rate of evolution by natural selection in the peppered moth in his first series of A Mathematical Theory of Natural and Artificial Selection. He estimated that for the peppered moth having reproductive cycle in a year, it would take 48 generations to produce the dominant (melanic or black) forms, and the melanic population could dominate the entire moth population after 13 generations. He concluded that "the only probable explanation is the not very intense degree of natural selection". University of Oxford zoologist E. B. Ford supported the bird-predation hypothesis. To experimentally investigate the issue he recruited Bernard Kettlewell in 1952 under a grant from Nuffield Foundation.

=== Biology of the peppered moth ===
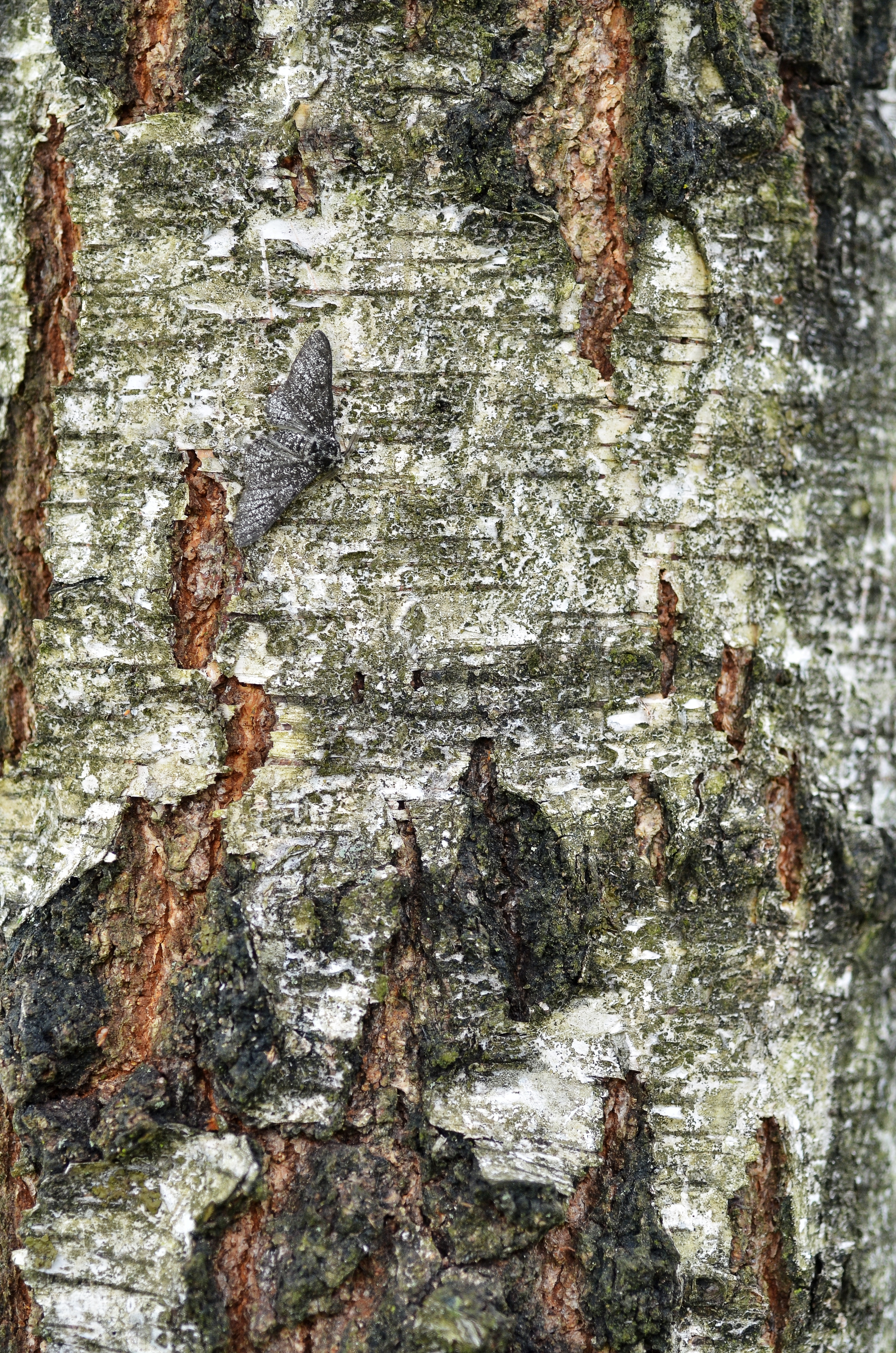
Peppered moth insularia on the bark of a lichen-covered birch

By the time of Kettlewell, it was known in England that there were three varieties of peppered moth. The normal, typica, is whitish-grey in colour with dark speckles on the wings. The colour was a perfect camouflage on light-coloured trees covered with lichens. The new form, carbonaria, was completely black. There was an intermediate form, called insularia, which was light-coloured with speckled wings, but distinct from typica in that it was not whitish. The moths were active at night, and rested on tree trunks and boughs during the day.

== The experiment ==
The main experiment, called mark-release-recapture, started in the summer of 1953 and lasted for three years. It consists of two continuous phases.

=== Preparation ===
Kettlewell first devised a standard procedure for scoring the moths. It was necessary to determine how far apart the moths should be placed so they were indistinguishable from their backgrounds. Correct separation would result in effective and selective predation by birds, because if the moths were all too close then birds would be able to differentiate even well camouflaged individuals. He tested his scoring method in the woodlands near Birmingham by releasing 651 peppered moths (consisting of typica, carbonaria and insularia), and then at an aviary at the Research Station in Madingley in Cambridge. In the aviary he released 69 moths, which he allowed two great tits (Parus major) to prey upon. He found that the initial procedure failed, as the birds actively looked for any moth, regardless of their colour or background. He succeeded only by using freshly captured moths consisting of 9 black and 8 white types, which he released separately. He found that the birds preferentially caught the moths according to the background colour on which the moths were present.

=== First phase ===
For his first experimental site, Kettlewell chose Christopher Cadbury Bird Reserve, near Rubery, Birmingham, because it was heavily polluted, but still inhabited by a number of bird species. He caught all three types of peppered moth and marked them underneath their wings with cellulose paint, so that he would be able to identify them later from non-experimental individuals after recapture. He started capturing the moths on the night of 26 June 1953, and lasted till 5 July. Out of his total capture, he selected 630 (447 carbonaria, 137 typica, and 46 insularia) male moths and released them into the woods. Within two days, 149 moths were recaptured, out of which carbonaria was 27.5%, typica 13%, and insularia 17%. (The total capture after release was 770, but 621 of them were non-experimental moths, i.e. not bearing the paint marks.) Thus their survival values were 5.72%, 1.48%, and 4.32% respectively. This shows that black moths had the best survival advantage in a darkened and polluted environment.

=== Second phase ===
To compare the conditions of predation in different environments Kettlewell planned to perform similar experiment in both polluted and clean environments. In 1954 he surveyed several woodlands including Devon and Cornwall, but found them unsuitable because of presence of some carbonaria forms, which indicated unclean environment. Finally he went to Deanend Wood in Dorset, which was well covered with lichens. He found only the white type, including 1 insularia form, indicating clean environment. In mid-June 1955 he started the experiment. He brought along 3,000 carbonaria type. After several days, he found that out the total 190 moths eaten by birds in the wild, 86% were the black type while only 14% were the white type. In his release-and-recapture experiment for 11 days, he used 799 moths, and his recapture rate was 13.7% for the white type, but only 4.7% for the black type.

Immediately after completion, he headed back to Birmingham, now accompanied by the renowned ethologist Niko Tinbergen. Tinbergen was responsible for filming the experiment, particularly to verify whether or not birds were the main predators. Out of 227 moths they released, 154 were carbonaria, 64 typica, and 9 insularia. The recapture rate within two days was 82%, 16%, and 2% respectively. It was another success, with Tinbergen capturing live movie clips of birds eating the moths.

=== Conclusion ===
The conclusion of Kettlewell's experiment can be summarised as follows:

1. Birds were the main predators of moth.
2. Moth were eaten by birds selectively in both polluted and clean forests, indicating camouflage efficiency of the different varieties of moths.
3. The more conspicuous form of moth was always less in number after recapture; i.e. the white type in Birmingham, and the black type in Dorset.
4. In clean and lichened area, dark moths remained scarce and were rapidly eliminated because of their conspicuousness even when experimentally introduced.

== Criticisms ==
Theodore David Sargent, professor of zoology at the University of Massachusetts at Amherst, published a critique of Kettlewell's work. Based on his experiments between 1965 and 1969, he concluded that it was not possible to reproduce Kettlewell's results, and said that birds showed no preference on moth on either black or white tree trunks. He suggested that Kettlewell had trained the birds to pick moths on tree trunks to obtain desired results.

Michael Majerus's 1998 book Melanism: Evolution in Action is an adaptation of Kettlewell's The Evolution of Melanism, which discussed criticisms of Kettlewell's original experimental methods. When the biologist Jerry Coyne reviewed this book in Nature, he stated that the most serious problem was that only two peppered moths had been found on tree trunks. He also wrote that the white moths had increased in numbers before the lichen had returned and that Kettlewell's findings of moths choosing matching backgrounds had not been replicated in later experiments. Coyne compared his reaction to "the dismay attending my discovery, at the age of 6, that it was my father and not Santa who brought the presents on Christmas Eve". He concluded that "for the time being we must discard Biston as a well-understood example of natural selection in action, although it is clearly a case of evolution. There are many studies more appropriate for use in the classroom" and that further studies of the animal's habits were needed.

Contrary to this review, Majerus had stressed that the basic findings from that work were correct, and that differential bird predation of polluted environment "is the primary influence of the evolution of melanism in the peppered moth". Coyne's statement that only two peppered moths had been found on tree trunks was incorrect, as the book gives the resting positions of 47 peppered moths Majerus had found in the wild between 1964 and 1996; twelve were on tree trunks (six exposed, six unexposed), twenty were at the trunk/branch joint, and fifteen resting on branches. Majerus found that the review did not reflect the factual content of the book or his own views, and cited an assessment by the entomologist Donald Frack that there was essentially no resemblance between the book and Coyne's review, which appeared to be a summary of the Sargent et al. paper rather than Majerus's book.

The review was subsequently picked up by the journalist Robert Matthews, who wrote an article for The Sunday Telegraph, 14 March 1999, claiming that "the rise and fall of the peppered moth, is based on a series of scientific blunders. Experiments using the moth in the Fifties and long believed to prove the truth of natural selection are now thought to be worthless, having been designed to come up with the 'right' answer." Majerus regarded this view as surprising, and not one that would be shared by those involved in the field. He noted numerous scientific inaccuracies, misquotations and misrepresentations in the article, but thought this was common in press reports. He stated that he had spoken to Matthews for over half an hour and had to explain many details as Matthews hadn't read the book, but "Even then, he got nearly everything wrong."

=== Of Moths and Men ===
The 2002 book Of Moths and Men, by the journalist Judith Hooper, said Kettlewell's experiments had appeared to be "the slam-dunk of natural selection", but argued that the cause of the dark forms appearing was still an "irreducible mystery". Although not a creationist herself, Hooper argued that the peppered moth experiments failed to represent evolution. She claimed that Kettlewell's field notes could not be found and suggested that his experiment was fraudulent, on the basis of Sargent's criticisms alleging that the photographs of the moths were taken of dead moths placed on a log. She said that E. B. Ford was a "Darwinian zealot", and claimed that he exploited the scientifically naive Kettlewell to obtain the desired experimental results. She then alleged that scientists in general showed "credulous and biased" acceptance of evolution. The book's reception led to claims that the peppered moth evolution story ought to be deleted from textbooks.

Scientists have examined the allegations made by Hooper, and found them to be without merit. Majerus described the book as "littered with errors, misrepresentations, misinterpretations and falsehoods". David W. Rudge, after critical analyses of Kettlewell' works, declared that "none of Hooper's arguments is found to withstand careful scrutiny", and that all "these charges are baseless and stem from a fundamental misunderstanding of the nature of science as a process." He concluded "that Hooper does not provide one shred of evidence to support this serious allegation."

=== Religious controversy ===
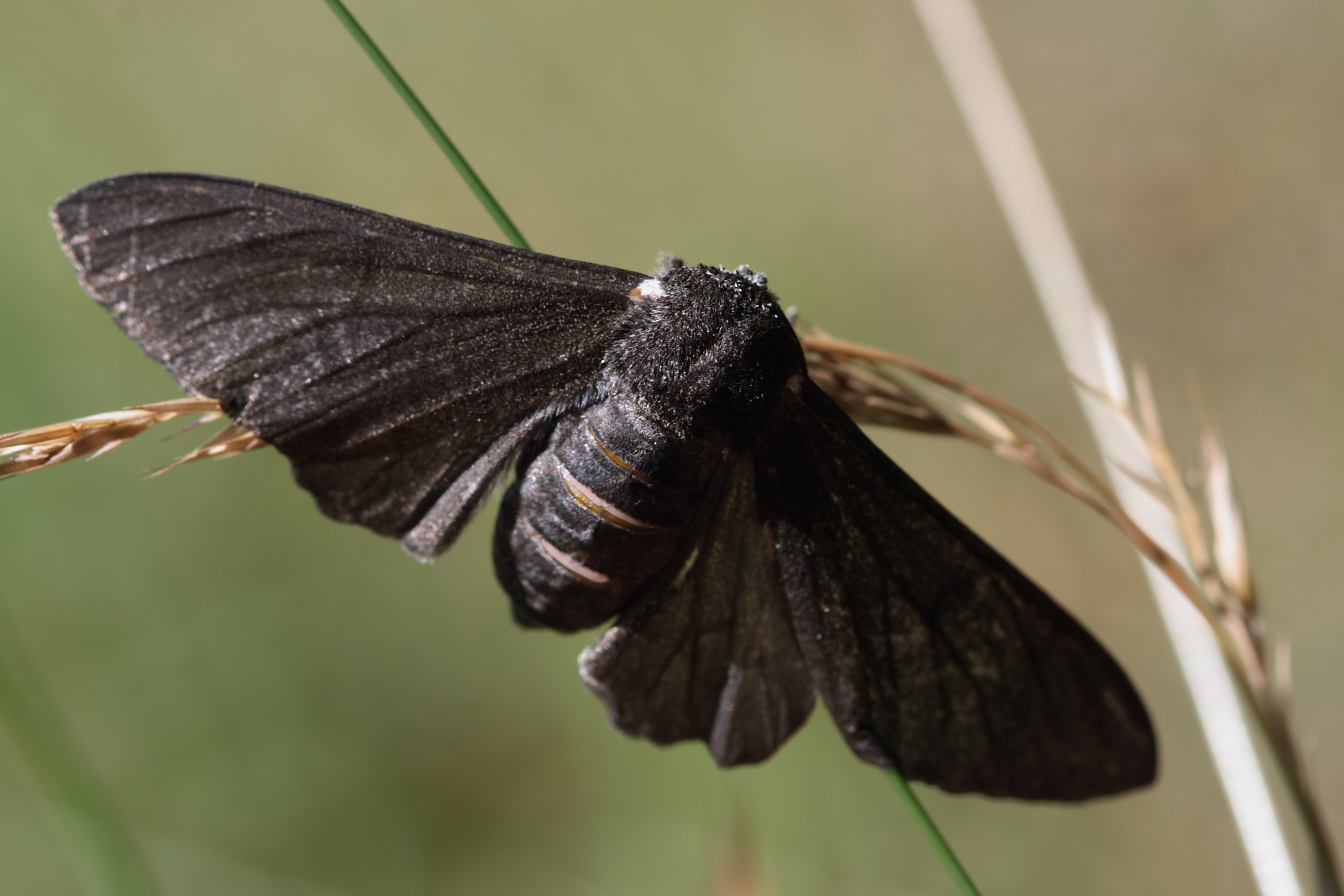
Creationists have disputed the occurrence or significance of the melanic carbonaria morph increasing in frequency.

When serious criticism and controversy arose, the story was picked up by creationists. Coyne's review was taken up by intelligent design creationists, and at a seminar presenting the wedge strategy on 13 March 1999, creationist and professor of law Phillip E. Johnson said that the moths "do not sit on tree trunks", "moths had to be glued to the trunks" for pictures and that the experiments were "fraudulent" and a "scam." This led Frack to exchange with intelligent design proponent Jonathan Wells, who conceded that Majerus listed six moths on exposed tree trunks (out of 47), but argued that this was "an insignificant proportion". Wells wrote an essay on the subject, a shortened version of which appeared in The Scientist of 24 May 1999, claiming that "In 25 years of fieldwork, C.A. Clarke and his colleagues found only one peppered moth on a tree trunk", and concluding that "The fact that peppered moths do not normally rest on tree trunks invalidates Kettlewell's experiments".

In 2000 Wells wrote Icons of Evolution, in which he claims, "What the textbooks don't explain, however, is that biologists have known since the 1980s that the classical story has some serious flaws. The most serious is that peppered moths in the wild don't even rest on tree trunks. The textbook photographs, it turns out, have been staged." The arguments were dismissed by Majerus, Cook and Bruce Grant who describes Wells as distorting the picture by selectively omitting or scrambling references in a way that is dishonest. Professional photography to illustrate textbooks uses dead insects because of the considerable difficulty in getting good images of both forms of moth in the same shot. The scientific studies actually consisted of observational data rather than using such photographs. The photographs in Majerus's Melanism: Evolution in Action are unstaged pictures of live moths in the wild, and the photographs of moths on tree-trunks, apart from some slight blurring, look little different from the "staged" photographs. While an experiment did involve the gluing of dead moths to trees, this practice was just one of many different ways used to study different individual elements of the overall hypothesis. This particular experiment was not meant to exactly reproduce natural conditions but instead was used to assess how the numbers of moths available (their density) affected the foraging practices of birds.

On 27 November 2000, the school board of Pratt County, Kansas continued efforts to favor intelligent design teaching by requiring the use of alternative resources, such as Of Pandas and People designed by Wells and other ID scholars. (In the book Wells accused Kettlewell's experiment as "fraudulent" and "staged".) Coyne and Grant wrote a letter to The Pratt Tribune in which they defended the moth experiments and revealed the misrepresentations by Wells.
