= Industrial melanism =

Evolutionary effect

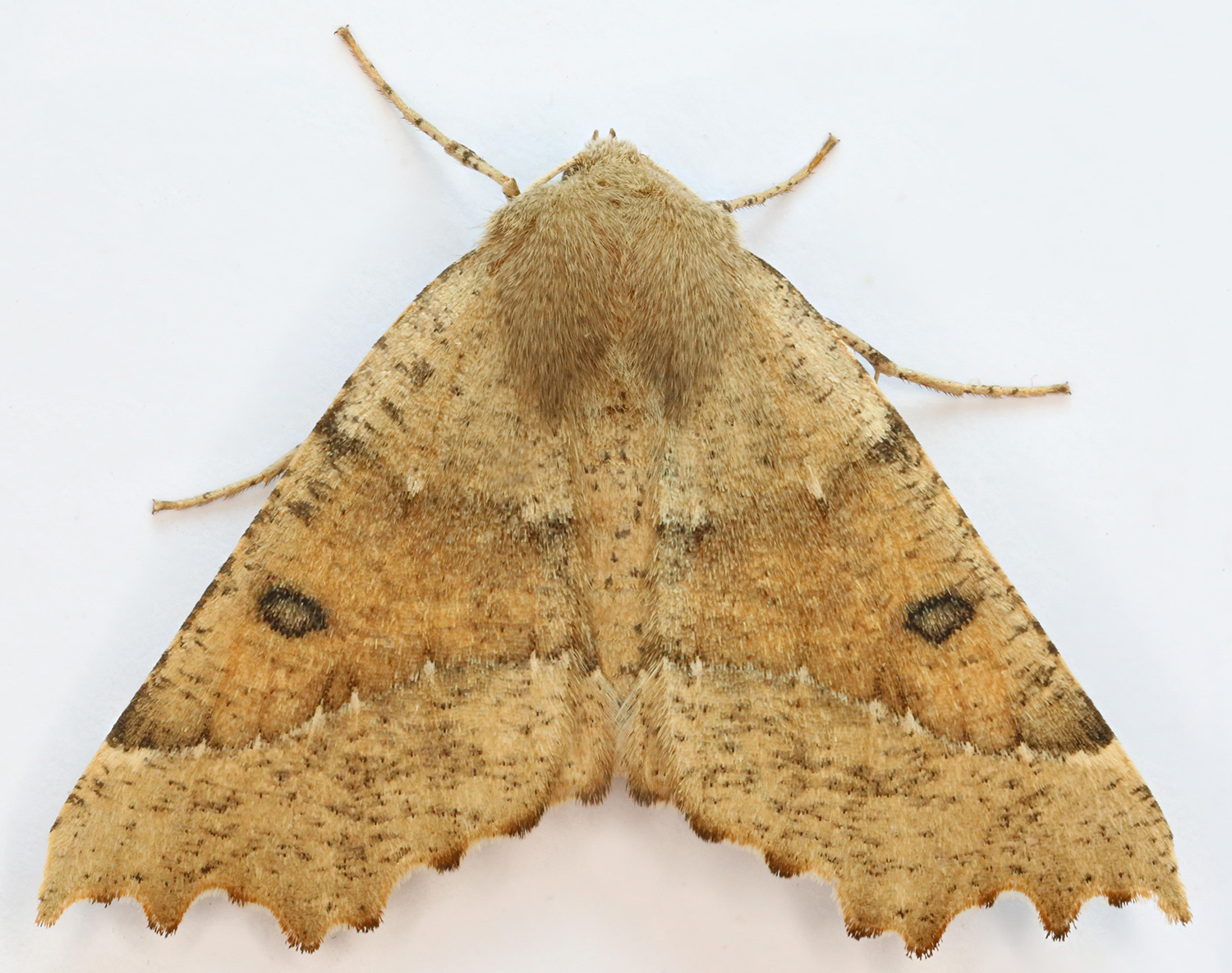
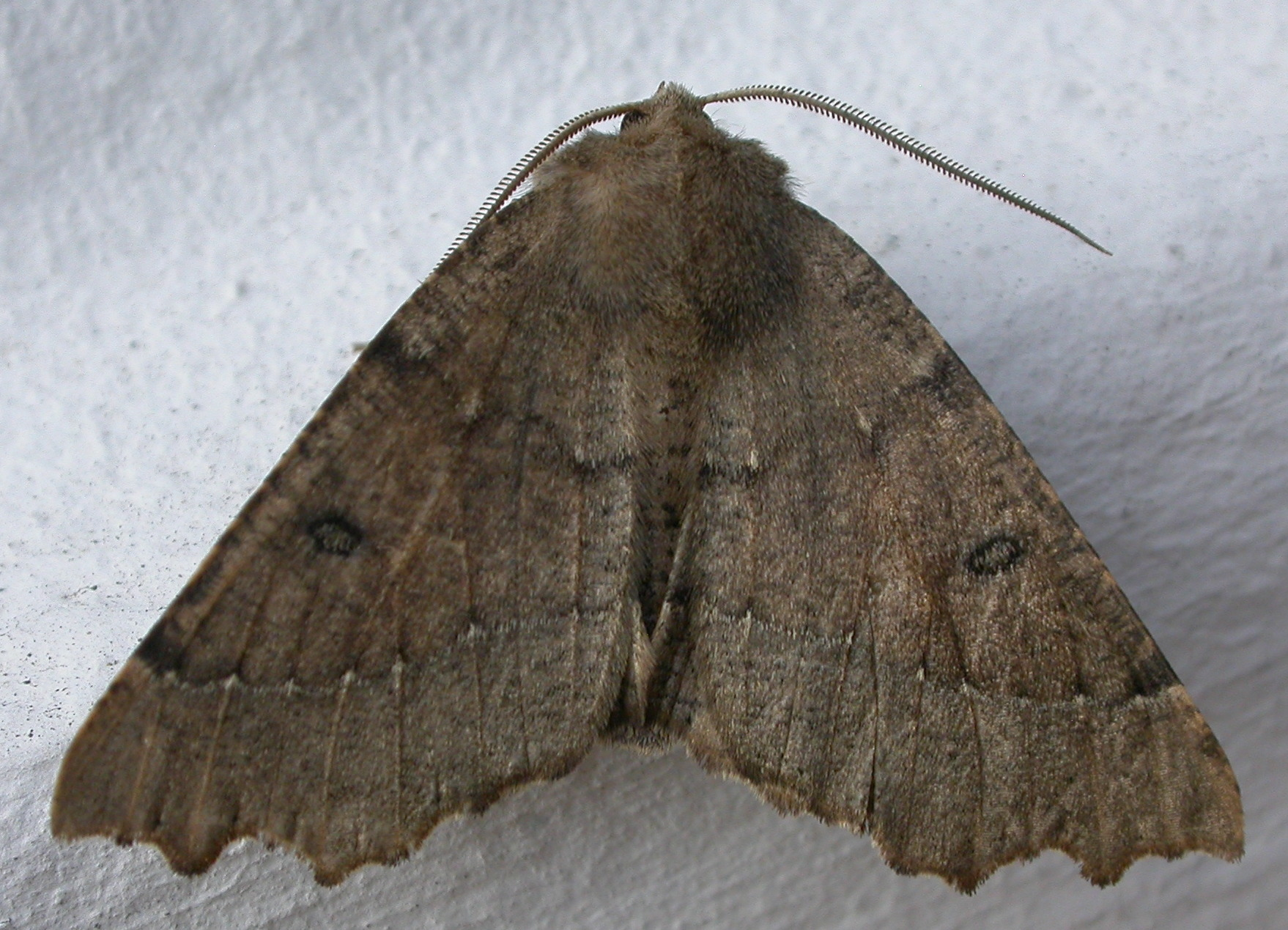
Odontopera bidentata, the scalloped hazel moth, in typical and melanic forms. The dark form became common in polluted areas after the Industrial Revolution.

Industrial melanism is an evolutionary effect prominent in several arthropods, where dark pigmentation (melanism) has evolved in an environment affected by industrial pollution, including sulphur dioxide gas and dark soot deposits. Sulphur dioxide kills lichens, leaving tree bark bare where in clean areas it is boldly patterned, while soot darkens bark and other surfaces. Darker pigmented individuals have a higher fitness in those areas as their camouflage matches the polluted background better; they are thus favoured by natural selection. This change, extensively studied by Bernard Kettlewell (1907–1979), is a popular teaching example in Darwinian evolution, providing evidence for natural selection. Kettlewell's results have been challenged by zoologists, creationists and the journalist Judith Hooper, but later researchers have upheld Kettlewell's findings.

Industrial melanism is widespread in the Lepidoptera (butterflies and moths), involving over 70 species such as Odontopera bidentata (scalloped hazel) and Lymantria monacha (dark arches), but the most studied is the evolution of the peppered moth, Biston betularia. It is also seen in a beetle, Adalia bipunctata (two-spot ladybird), where camouflage is not involved as the insect has conspicuous warning coloration, and in the seasnake Emydocephalus annulatus where the melanism may help in excretion of trace elements through sloughing of the skin. The rapid decline of melanism that has accompanied the reduction of pollution, in effect a natural experiment, makes natural selection for camouflage "the only credible explanation".

Other explanations for the observed correlation with industrial pollution have been proposed, including strengthening the immune system in a polluted environment, absorbing heat more rapidly when sunlight is reduced by air pollution, and the ability to excrete trace elements into melanic scales and feathers.

== History ==
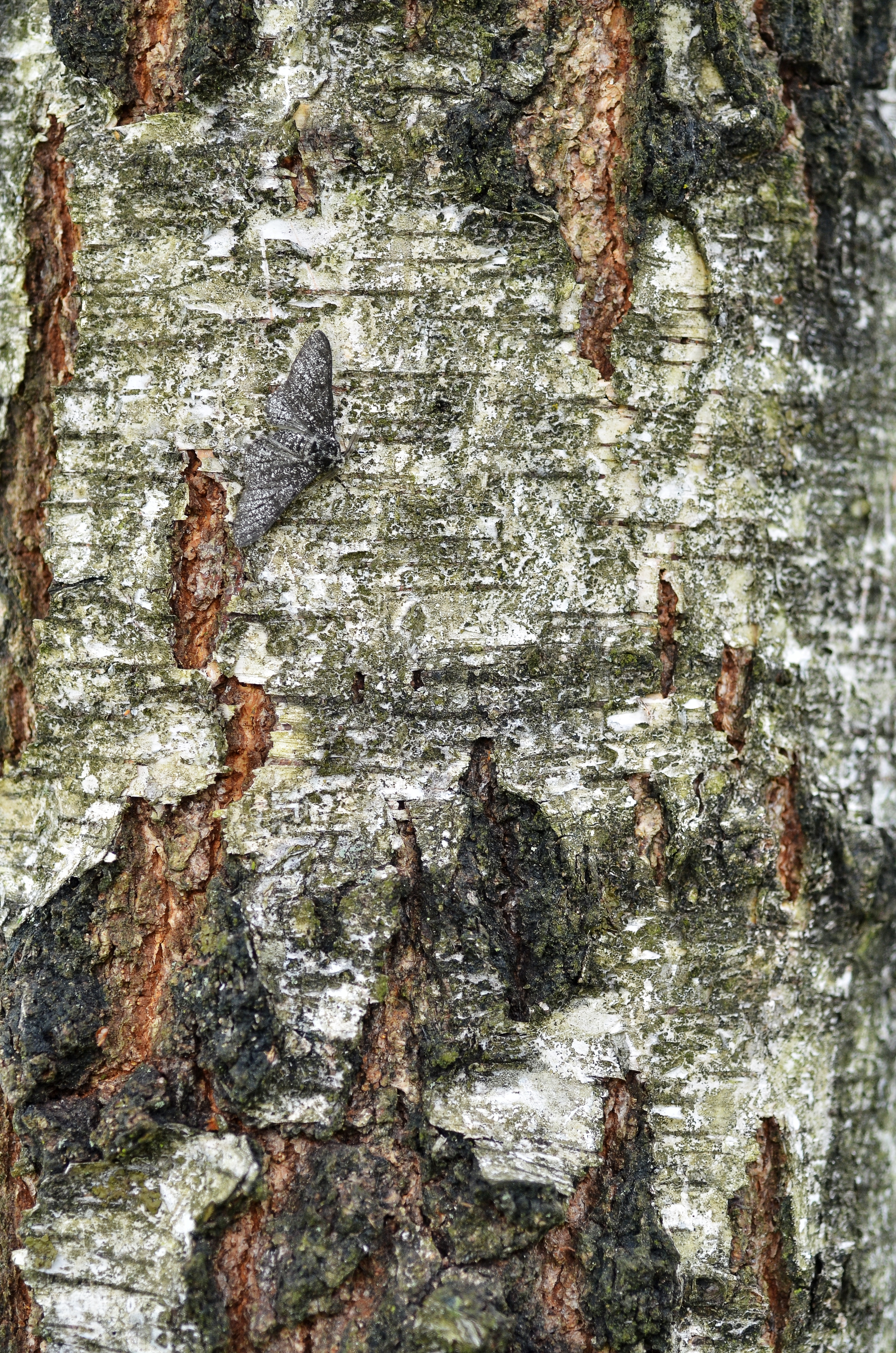
Intermediate insularia form (between pale typica and dark carbonaria in tone) of peppered moth on a lichen-covered birch tree: Bernard Kettlewell counted the frequencies of all three forms.

Industrial melanism was first noticed in 1900 by the geneticist William Bateson; he observed that the colour morphs were inherited, but did not suggest an explanation for the polymorphism.

In 1906, the geneticist Leonard Doncaster described the increase in frequency of the melanic forms of several moth species from about 1800 to 1850 in the heavily industrialised north-west region of England.

In 1924, the evolutionary biologist J. B. S. Haldane constructed a mathematical argument showing that the rapid growth in frequency of the carbonaria form of the peppered moth, Biston betularia, implied selective pressure.

From 1955 onwards, the geneticist Bernard Kettlewell conducted a series of experiments exploring the evolution of melanism in the peppered moth. He used a capture-mark-recapture technique to show that dark forms survived better than light ones.

By 1973, pollution in England had begun to decrease, and the dark carbonaria form had declined in frequency. This provided convincing evidence, gathered and analysed by Kettlewell and others such as the entomologist and geneticist Michael Majerus and the population geneticist Laurence M. Cook, that its rise and fall had been caused by natural selection in response to the changing pollution of the landscape.

== Taxonomic range ==
Industrial melanism is known from over 70 species of moth that Kettlewell found in England, and many others from Europe and North America. Among these, Apamea crenata (clouded border brindle moth) and Acronicta rumicis (knot grass moth) are always polymorphic, though the melanic forms are more common in cities and (like those of the peppered moth) are declining in frequency as those cities become less polluted.

Among other insects, industrial melanism has been observed in a beetle, Adalia bipunctata, the two-spot ladybird, and in a barklouse,Mesopsocus unipunctatus.

In the vertebrates, industrial melanism is known from the turtle-headed seasnake Emydocephalus annulatus, and may be present in urban feral pigeons.

== Camouflage ==
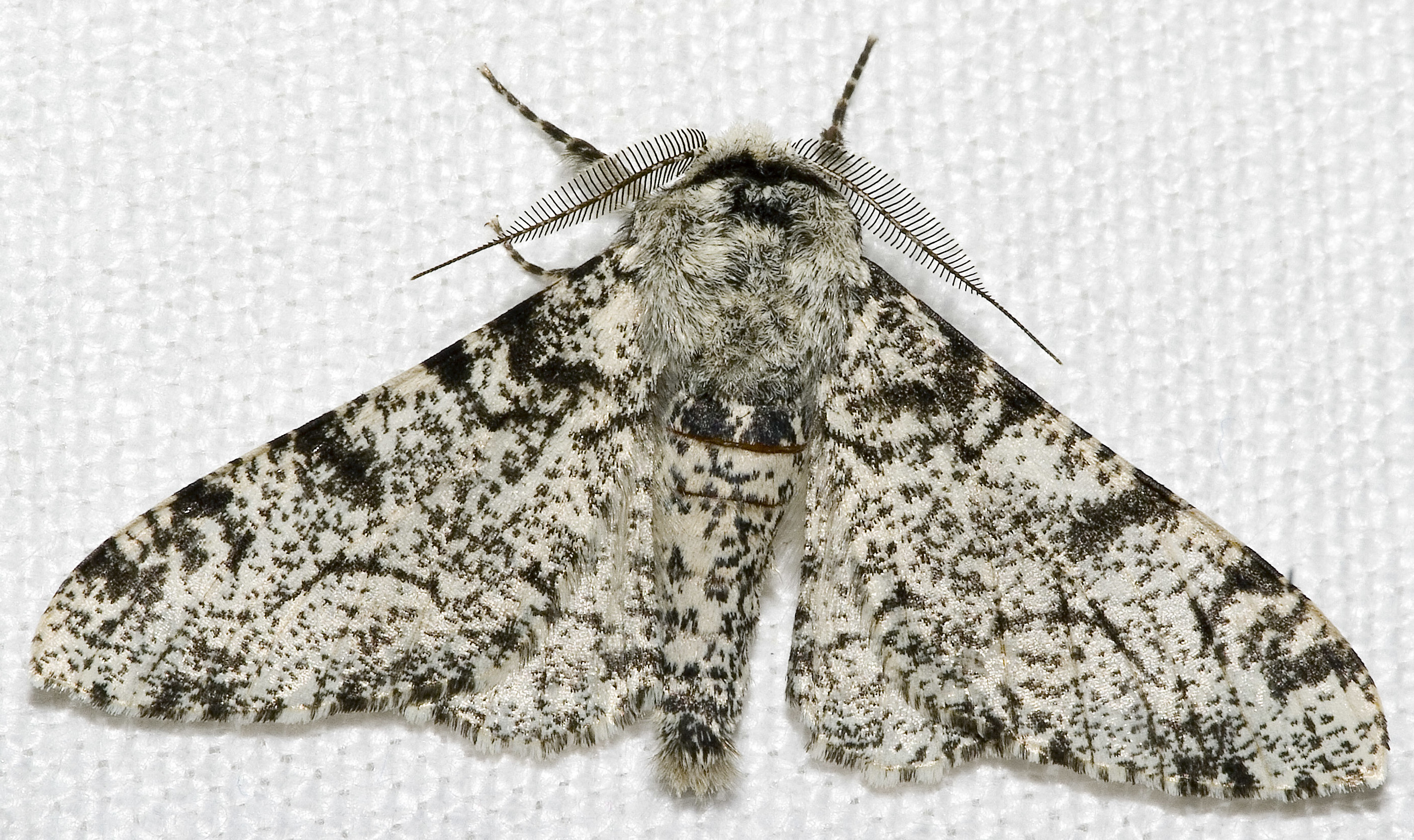
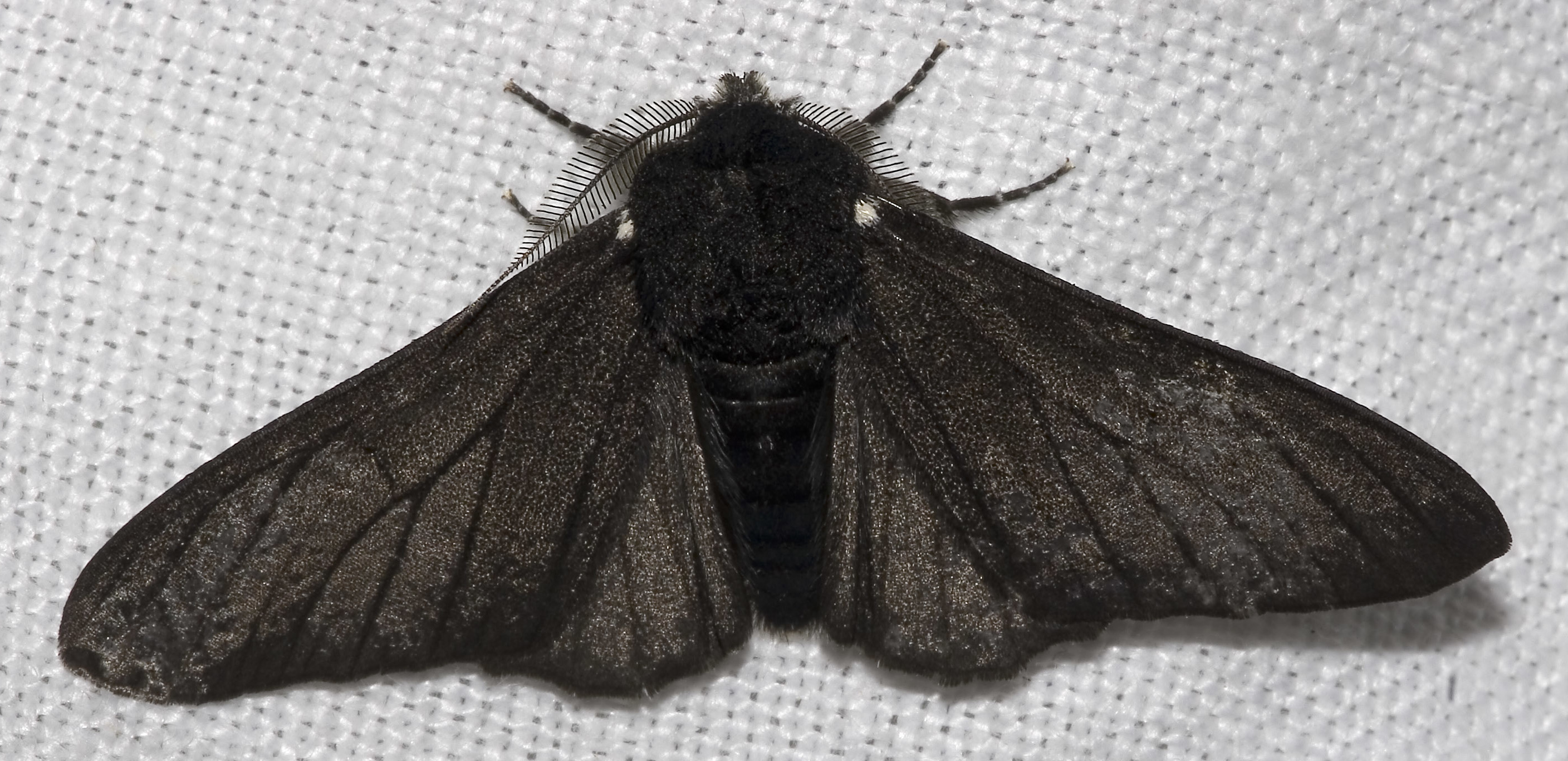
Biston betularia, the peppered moth, in typical and melanic forms

Originally, peppered moths lived where light-colored lichens covered the trees. For camouflage from predators against that clean background, they had generally light coloration. During the Industrial Revolution in England, sulphur dioxide pollution in the atmosphere reduced the lichen cover, while soot blackened the bark of urban trees, making the light-colored moths more vulnerable to predation. This provided a selective advantage to the gene responsible for melanism, and the darker-colored moths increased in frequency. The melanic phenotype of Biston betularia has been calculated to give a fitness advantage as great as 30 per cent. By the end of the 19th century it almost completely replaced the original light-coloured type (var. typica), forming a peak of 98% of the population in 1895.

Tree bark covered in shrubby and leafy lichens forms a patterned background against which non-melanic disruptively patterned moth camouflage is effective.

Melanic B. betularia have been widely observed in North America. In 1959, 90% of B. betularia in Michigan and Pennsylvania were melanic. By 2001, melanism dropped to 6% of the population, following clean air legislation. The drop in melanism was correlated with an increase in species diversity of lichens, a decrease in the atmospheric pollutant sulphur dioxide, and an increase in the pale phenotype. The return of lichens is in turn directly correlated with the reduction in atmospheric sulphur dioxide.

An additional study in 2018 further quantified survivability by looking at color and luminance camouflage and avian artificial predation models. For color camouflage, typica moths blended better under lichen bark than carbonaria, but when placed under plain bark, there was no significant difference. However, in luminance camouflage, carbonaria moths blended better compared to typica on a plain bark tree. When both variants were placed on an unpolluted lichen covered tree, typica moths had a 21% better survival rate.

=== Controversy ===
Kettlewell's experiments were criticised by the zoologist Theodore David Sargent, who failed to reproduce Kettlewell's results between 1965 and 1969, and argued that Kettlewell had specially trained his birds to give the desired results. Michael Majerus however found that Kettlewell was basically correct in concluding that differential bird predation in a polluted environment was the primary cause of industrial melanism in the peppered moth. The story was in turn taken up in a 2002 book Of Moths and Men, by the journalist Judith Hooper, asserting that Kettlewell's findings were fraudulent. The story was picked up by creationists who repeated the assertions of fraudulence. Zoologists including L. M. Cook, B. S. Grant, Majerus and David Rudge however all upheld Kettlewell's account, finding that each of Hooper's and the creationists' claims collapsed when the facts were examined.

It has been suggested that the demonstrated relationship between melanism and pollution can not be fully proven because the exact reason for increase in survivability can not be tracked and pin-pointed. However, as air quality has improved in industrial areas of America and Britain, through improved regulation, offering the conditions for a natural experiment, melanism has sharply declined in moths including B. betularia and Odontopera bidentata. Cook and J. R. G. Turner have concluded that "natural selection is the only credible explanation for the overall decline", and other biologists working in the area concur with this judgement.

== Alternative explanations ==
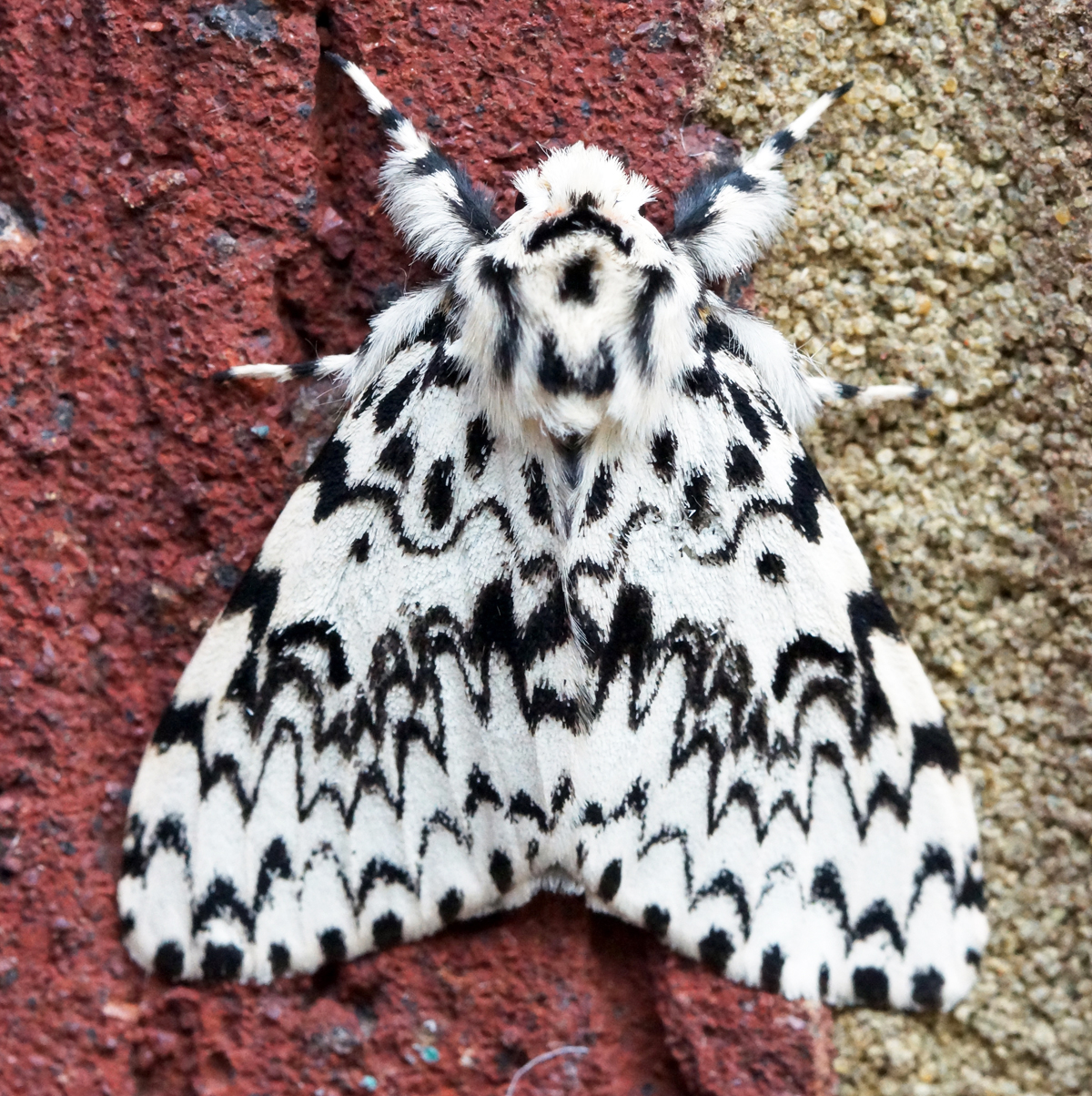
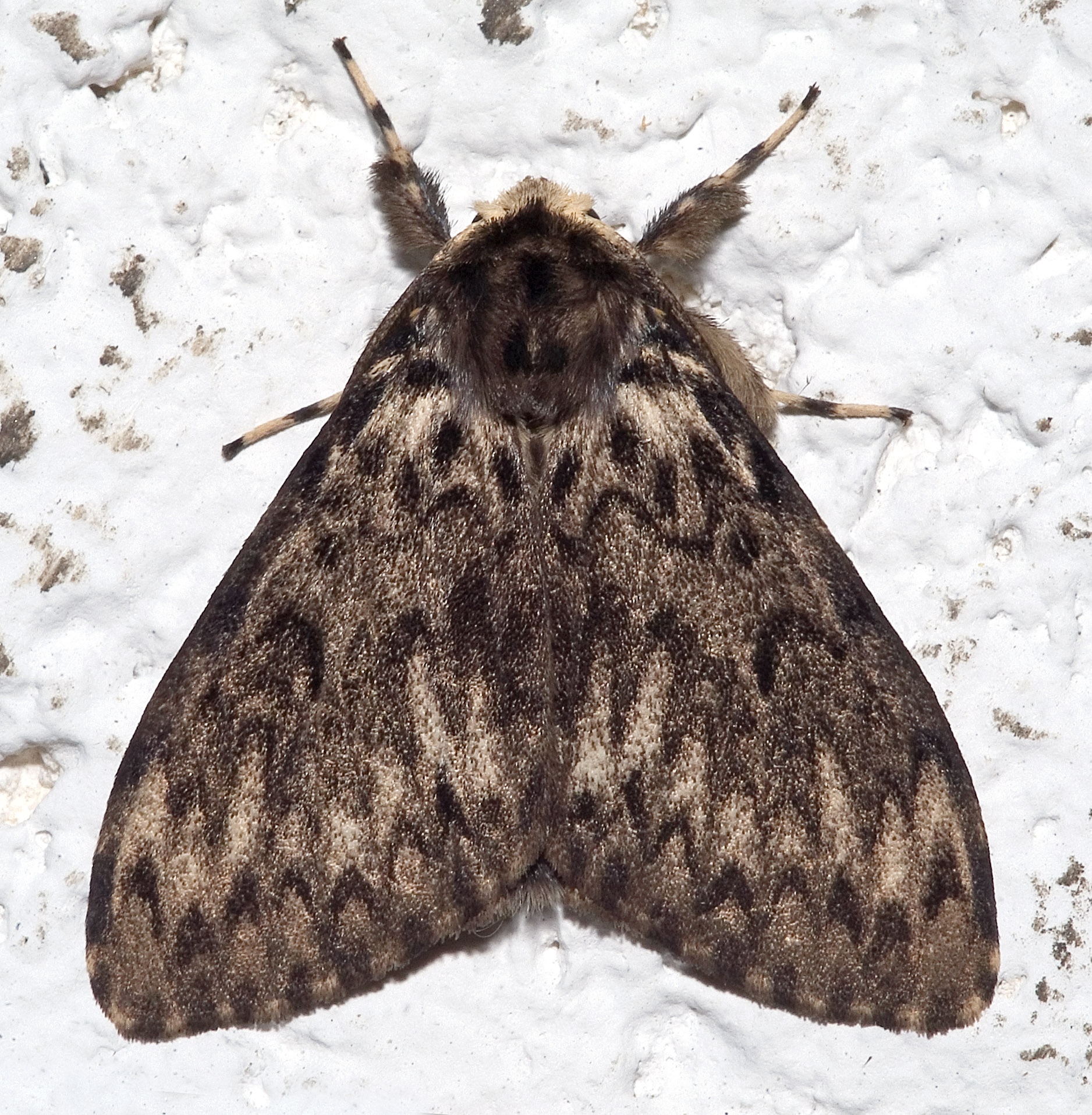
Lymantria monacha, the dark arches moth, in typical and melanic forms

=== Immunity ===
In 1921, the evolutionary biologist Richard Goldschmidt argued that the observed increase in the melanic form of the black arches moth, Lymantria monacha, could not have been caused by mutation pressure alone, but required a selective advantage from an unknown cause: he did not consider camouflage as an explanation.

Nearly a century later, it was suggested that the moth's industrial melanism might, in addition (pleiotropy) to providing camouflage with "the well-known protective dark coloration", also confer better immunity to toxic chemicals from industrial pollution. The darker forms have a stronger immune response to foreign objects; these are encapsulated by haemocytes (insect blood cells), and the capsule so formed is then hardened with deposits of the dark pigment, melanin.

=== Trace metal excretion ===
A non-camouflage mechanism has been suggested for some vertebrates. In tropical ocean regions subject to industrial pollution the turtle-headed seasnake Emydocephalus annulatus is more likely to be melanic. These snakes shed their skin every two to six weeks. Sloughed skin contains toxic minerals, higher for dark skin, so industrial melanism could be selected for through improved excretion of trace elements. (Note: The article does not address whether this is a genetic mutation or reversible adaptation by individuals.) The same may apply in the case of urban feral pigeons, which have the ability to remove trace metals such as zinc to their feathers. However, toxic lead was not found to accumulate in feathers, so the putative mechanism is limited in its range.

=== Thermal advantage ===
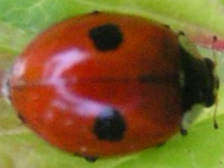
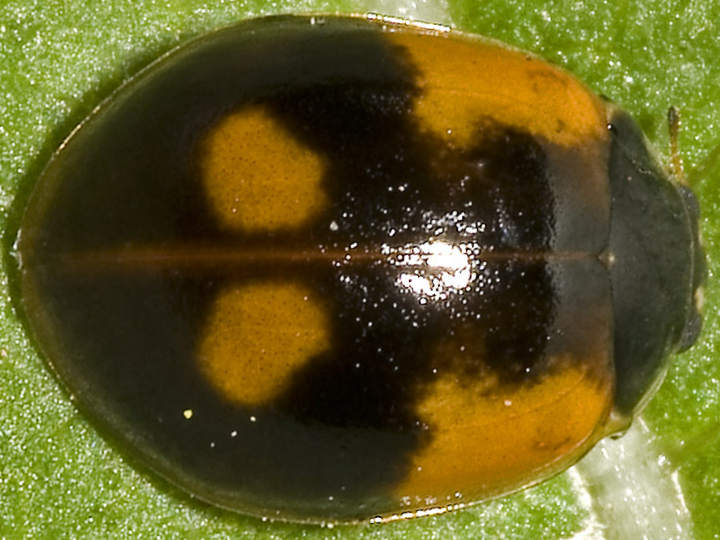
Adalia bipunctata, the two-spot ladybird, in typical and melanic forms

Melanic forms of the two-spot ladybird Adalia bipunctata are very frequent in and near cities, and rare in unpolluted countryside, so they appear to be industrial. Ladybirds are aposematic (with conspicuous warning coloration), so camouflage cannot explain the distribution. A proposed explanation is that the melanic forms have a thermal advantage directly linked to the pollution aspect of industrialization, since smoke and particulates in the air reduce the amount of sunlight that reaches the habitats of these species. Melanic phenotypes should then be favoured by natural selection, as the dark coloration absorbs the limited sunlight better. A possible explanation might be that in colder environments, the thermal advantages of industrial melanism might increase activity and the likelihood to mate. In the Netherlands, melanic A. bipunctata had a distinct mating advantage over the non-melanic form.

However, thermal melanism failed to explain the distribution of the species near Helsinki where the city forms a relatively warm 'heat island', while near the Finnish coast there is more sunlight as well as more melanism, so the selective pressure driving melanism requires a different explanation. A study in Birmingham similarly found no evidence of thermal melanism but a strong correlation with smoke pollution; melanism declined from 1960 to 1978 as the city became cleaner. Further, the same study found that a related species, Adalia decempunctata, experienced no change in frequency of melanism in the same places in that period.
