= Melanism: Evolution in Action =

1988 book by Mike Majerus

- Author: Mike Majerus
- Language: English
- Genre: Non-fiction
- Publication date: 1998
- ISBN: 0-19-854982-2

Melanism: Evolution in Action (ISBN 0-19-854982-2) is a book by Mike Majerus, published in 1998. It is an update of Bernard Kettlewell's book The Evolution of Melanism.

The book contains a very useful summary of Majerus' work on melanism in ladybirds and a review of the peppered moth story, including observations on moth behavior which sparked controversy. It may be criticised for being unevenly edited so as not to suit any one audience in its entirety. For example, it explains the basic principles of evolution such as the Hardy–Weinberg law in earlier sections, and in later sections includes graduate level concepts.

Jerry Coyne reviewed the book for Nature, calling attention to the importance of the new moth behavior observations, and how they shook Bernard Kettlewell's original hypothesis.

This review has been criticised by Majerus and others of not being representative of the work. Reviews such as by Laurence Cook discussed Majerus' treatment but did not anticipate the controversy largely provoked by Coyne's review.

== See also ==
- Peppered moth evolution#Criticism and controversy
