= General selection model =

Model of population genetics

The general selection model (GSM) is a model of population genetics that describes how a population's allele frequencies will change when acted upon by natural selection.

== Equation ==
The General Selection Model applied to a single gene with two alleles (let's call them A1 and A2) is encapsulated by the equation:

$$\Delta q=\frac{pq  \big[q(W_2-W_1) + p(W_1 - W_0)\big ]}{\overline{W}}$$
where:

$p$ is the frequency of allele A1
$q$ is the frequency of allele A2
$\Delta q$ is the rate of evolutionary change of the frequency of allele A2
$W_0,W_1, W_2$ are the relative fitnesses of homozygous A1, heterozygous (A1A2), and homozygous A2 genotypes respectively.
$\overline{W}$ is the mean population relative fitness.

In words:

The product of the relative frequencies, $pq$, is a measure of the genetic variance. The quantity pq is maximized when there is an equal frequency of each gene, when $p=q$. In the GSM, the rate of change $\Delta Q$ is proportional to the genetic variation.

The mean population fitness $\overline{W}$ is a measure of the overall fitness of the population. In the GSM, the rate of change $\Delta Q$ is inversely proportional to the mean fitness $\overline{W}$—i.e. when the population is maximally fit, no further change can occur.

The remainder of the equation, $\big[q(W_2-W_1) + p(W_1 - W_0)\big ]$, refers to the mean effect of an allele substitution. In essence, this term quantifies what effect genetic changes will have on fitness.

== See also ==
- Darwinian fitness
- Hardy–Weinberg principle
- Population genetics
