= Westcombe =

Westcombe may refer to:

- Westcombe, Batcombe, Somerset, England
- Westcombe, Somerton, Somerset, England
- Westcombe Park, London
- Westcombe baronets, a title in the Baronetage of England
