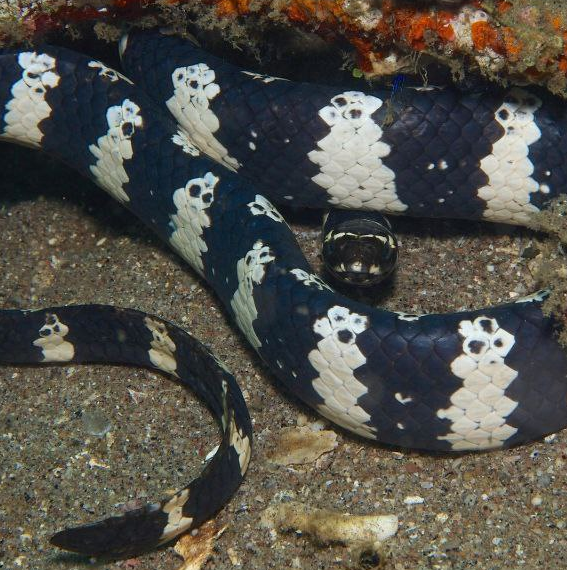

Conservation status
- Least Concern (IUCN 3.1)

Scientific classification
- Kingdom: Animalia
- Phylum: Chordata
- Order: Squamata
- Suborder: Serpentes
- Family: Elapidae
- Genus: Emydocephalus
- Species: E. annulatus

Binomial name
- Emydocephalus annulatus Krefft, 1869

Synonyms
- Emydocephalus szczerbaki

= Emydocephalus annulatus =

Species of snake

Emydocephalus annulatus, commonly known as the turtleheaded sea snake or egg-eating sea snake, is a species of sea snake that can be found in waters of Oceania near Australia and some Pacific Islands such as the Philippines and the Loyalty Islands of New Caledonia. The geographic range is sporadic, for example, with populations distributed near the eastern and western coasts of Australia in the Great Barrier Reef and the Timor Sea reefs, respectively. They do not, however, occur in the Gulf of Carpentaria along the north coast.

== Description ==
Named for its short, blunt head, this medium-sized snake has a slender build and varies in color. A single snake may exhibit only one color or may have banded patterns of white or yellow with dark rings. The scales on top of the head are large, regular, and entire. The rostral scale on the tip of the snout is conical in shape, and the second of three supralabial scales is the largest. The body has 15–17 rows of smooth, overlapping scales. It has 125–145 ventral scales, a single anal scale, and 20–33 single subcaudal scales. It may grow to 103 cm (41 in) in length.

An individual snake's color affects the amount of algal fouling that accumulates on its body. A snake of a darker, more monotonous color has a higher level of algae build-up than one of a paler, patterned variety. The added weight of algae affects an individual's speed, reducing it by up to 20%. Those whose locomotive skills were affected had a tendency to be more inactive and choose to hide among the coral, while those with little to no algal fouling were found actively foraging. The inactivity, however, did not affect their survival rates; lighter-colored snakes were not more likely to survive than their darker-colored counterparts.

== Dietary habits ==
Curiously, Emydocephalus is the only sea snake that does not possess palatal teeth. Contrary to the foraging habits of other snakes, the turtle-head tends to eat smaller, more frequent meals rather than larger, infrequent prey: this sea snake feeds solely on fish eggs; specifically, the eggs of demersal fish that attach to the substrate, such as those of damselfish, blennies, and gobies. The larger the snake, the more likely it is to feed on damselfish eggs, which lie in exposed areas, rather than blennies' and gobies', whose eggs are located in narrow crevices.

E. annulatus populations tend to stay where they are and rarely move between territories; they tend to be sedentary. This could possibly be related to the spatial memory of snakes and their ability to remember where nests are located. If they stay in the same area, then the snakes are able to feed regularly on the same sites.

The feeding strategy of Emydocephalus has been compared to that of a grazing mammal. This atypical method of feeding is evidence of the great adaptive radiation of snakes.

== Mating habits ==
Terrestrial snakes use pheromones to locate potential sexual partners, with a male often tracking a female's scent over large distances. This is not possible, though, in the aquatic environment of the turtle-headed sea snake. E. annulatus instead uses visual cues to search for mates. These include the size, movement, and color pattern of the object holding its attention. Upon locating females, the reception of female skin lipid pheromones by tongue-flicking males is necessary for males to continue courtship and mating.

Turtle-headed sea snakes are sexually dimorphic: the females of this species grow larger than males, and the rugosity of the scales is also greatly increased in males compared to females.

== Conservation ==
In recent years, a steady decline in populations in and around the New Caledonian Lagoon has been reported. In 2003, volunteers spotted an average of more than six snakes per day within the protected coral reef snorkeling area in the lagoon, which decreased to less than two per day in 2011. In 2006, similar studies were also done in Ashmore Reef in northern Australia that exhibited a decline in population, as well. The cause of the decline is indistinct in either case, though the authors of both studies attributed it to human interference, habitat degradation due to tourism, coral bleaching, and habitat and diet complexity.
