= Michael Majerus =

British geneticist (1954–2009)

Michael E. N. Majerus
- Born: 13 February 1954; Middlesex, England
- Died: 27 January 2009 (aged 54); Coton, Cambridgeshire, England
- Education: Royal Holloway College
- Known for: Peppered moth evolution
- Awards: Sir Peter Scott Memorial Award
- Scientific career
- Fields: Entomology, Evolutionary biology, Genetics
- Workplaces: Keele University; University of Cambridge; Clare College, Cambridge

Michael Eugene Nicolas Majerus (13 February 1954 – 27 January 2009) was a British geneticist and professor of evolution at the University of Cambridge. He was also a teaching fellow at Clare College, Cambridge. He was an enthusiast in Darwin's theory of evolution by natural selection and became a world authority in his field of insect evolutionary biology. He was widely noted for his work on moths and ladybirds and as an advocate of the science of evolution. He was also an enthusiastic educator and the author of several books on insects, evolution and sexual reproduction. He is best remembered as an ardent supporter and champion of experiments on peppered moth evolution.

== Biography ==
The son of Fernand and Muriel Majerus, Michael Majerus took an early interest in insects. He got his first butterfly net at the age of four. His father, a Luxembourg national by origin, encouraged him by taking him for field trips on weekends and bringing him home specimens from his travels. He was particularly interested in lepidopterans and ecological genetics following the work of E.B. Ford, whose book Moths (in the New Naturalist series) he bought at the age of ten. He was educated at Merchant Taylors' School, Northwood, and graduated in botany and zoology from Royal Holloway College, London. He earned his PhD from Royal Holloway College on the study of the genetic control of larval colour in the angle shades moth. He worked for two years at Keele University as a research demonstrator. In 1980 he joined the Department of Genetics at the University of Cambridge as a research associate. After promotion as lecturer in 1987 and reader in 2001, he was appointed professor of evolution in 2006. In 1990 he was elected fellow of Clare College, and from the next year, in 1991, he became a teaching fellow of the college, the post he held until his death.

He died 27 January 2009 after an unexpected and brief struggle with aggressive mesothelioma.

=== Personal life ===
Majerus was a passionate anti-creationist. He used much of his scientific works to argue against creationism.

He married Vicki Maclean in 1979, but their marriage was dissolved. He remarried Tamsin Harris in 1988 with whom he had two sons, and one daughter. They later divorced, and Majerus married, for the third time, Christina Poole in 2005.

== Achievements ==
After his doctoral work on moths, Majerus moved into studying ladybirds, an area which brought him widespread publicity as an expert in 2004 when the harlequin ladybird came to Britain, causing a disaster for native species. This publicity led to the involvement of members of the public in the effective monitoring of the spread of the harlequin. His work on the peppered moth provided new support for the understanding of peppered moth evolution.

His research work was largely focussed around insect species, particularly the peppered moth and ladybirds, but explored these from many different perspectives including melanism, male killers, sexual selection, sexually transmitted diseases, animal colouration, invasive species, and biological pest control.

=== Peppered moth evolution ===
The legacy of Majerus was largely built on his fervent defence and experimental works on the peppered moth evolution. The concept of industrial melanism in Biston betularia had been a primary example of Darwinian natural selection in action. With the experimental evidence of Bernard Kettlewell in the early 1950s, the story became a classic in evolutionary biology. However, the rise of creationism towards the end of 20th century brought forth serious attack. To increase the controversy, biologists also began to argue the validity of Kettlewell's experiments. The publication of Melanism: Evolution in Action in 1998 in which Majerus analysed and defended Kettlewell's experiments provoked severe criticism. Kettlewell's works were seen as lacking proper experimental procedure, with some even accusing it variously as a fake, fraudulent, hoax and wrong. The accusations were most influentially popularised by Judith Hooper in her 2002 book Of Moths and Men (which in turn received severe criticisms). One of the critics, Jerry Coyne, himself a professor of evolution at the University of Chicago, commented that: "[M]ost of the work described is inconclusive... for the time being we must discard Biston as a well-understood example of natural selection in action, although it is clearly a case of evolution." Majerus then designed an elaborate experiment to resolve the issues. Starting from 2001 he conducted experiments for seven years, and terminated by his own death. He had experimented with 4,864 moths in Cambridgeshire, becoming the largest experiment in such manner. After his death his experimental results were analysed by a collaboration of American and British geneticists, and was published in 2012. Majerus's works clearly vindicated the experiments on peppered moth evolution, and the paper concluded that:

The new data, coupled with the weight of previously existing data convincingly show that 'industrial melanism in the peppered moth is still one of the clearest and most easily understood examples of Darwinian evolution in action'.

== Honours and recognitions ==
Majerus was the president of the Amateur Entomologists' Society, a Fellow of the Royal Entomological Society, and a Life Fellow of the British Naturalists' Association. He received a number of awards, including the Peter Scott Memorial Award in 2006, for his contributions to British Natural History. In 2004 he was conferred the title "Distinguished Supporter" of the British Humanist Association. In 2010 the Amateur Entomologists' Society launched The Mike Majerus Grant with the aim of encouraging a new generation of entomologists by supporting and funding projects based in the British Isles which further the cause of entomological study, research or education by amateurs, especially the young.

== Books ==
- Majerus, Michael (2016). Roy, Helen; Brown, Peter (eds.). A natural history of ladybird beetles. Cambridge: Cambridge University Press. ISBN 978-1107116078.
- ——— Ware, Remy; Majerus, Christina (2008). A Year in the Lives of British Ladybirds. Orpington: Amateur Entomologists' Society. p. 59. ISBN 978-0-900-05473-0.
- ——— (2002). Moths. London: HarperCollins. p. 310. ISBN 978-0-002-20141-4.
- ——— (2003). Sex Wars: Genes, Bacteria, and Biased Sex Ratios. Princeton: Princeton University Press. p. 250. ISBN 978-0-691-00981-0.
- ——— (1998). Melanism: Evolution in Action. Oxford: Oxford University Press. p. 338. ISBN 978-0-198-54983-3.
- ——— Amos, William; Hurst, Gregory (1996). Evolution: the Four Billion Year War. Harlow, Essex: Longman. p. 340. ISBN 978-0-582-21569-6.
- ——— (1994). Ladybirds. London: Harper Collins ( New Naturalist No. 81 ). ISBN 978-000-219934-6.

== See also ==
- Polymorphism in Lepidoptera
