= Bruce Grant (biologist) =

Professor of biology at the College of William and Mary

Bruce S. Grant is emeritus professor of biology at the College of William and Mary. He has a particular research interest in the peppered moth, and published a book, Observing Evolution: Peppered Moths and the Discovery of Parallel Melanism in 2021.

Grant has a B.S. in Biology from Bloomsburg University of Pennsylvania in 1964, an M.S. in Genetics from North Carolina State University, Raleigh in 1966 and a Ph.D. in Genetics from North Carolina State University, Raleigh in 1968.

An article on his contributions in research, teaching, and mentoring was published in 2005 in Genetics.

== Views ==
In a review of Creationism's Trojan Horse: The Wedge of Intelligent Design, Grant wrote:

Neo-creationists imitate Paley’s designed-watch metaphor and peddle it like a Hong Kong Rolex, insisting it is authentic science and not religion. But of course it is religion: the intelligence in Intelligent Design demands the existence of a supernatural force or agent, so we might as well call that agent God, for short.

== Publications ==
- Grant, Bruce S. 2021. Industrial Melanism, eLS, Vol 2: 1–12, DOI:10.1002/9780470015902.a0029393 https://doi.org/10.1002/9780470015902.a0029393
- Grant, Bruce. 2020. VIGNETTE 10.3 Industrial Melanism: Genetic Adaptation to Pollution in, Fundamentals of Ecotoxicology: The Science of Pollution Fifth Edition, by Michael C. Newman, CRC Press Taylor & Francis Group, Boca Raton, FL
- Cook LM, Grant BS, Saccheri IJ, and Mallet J. 2012. Selective bird predation on the peppered moth: the last experiment of Michael Majerus. Biology Letters, https://doi.org/10.1098/rsbl.2011.1136
- Grant, Bruce S. 2009. 'Industrial melanism'. In: Evolution: The First Four Billion Years, edited by Ruse, M. and J. Travis. The Belknap Press of Harvard University Press, Cambridge, MA. pp. 652–656.
- Noor, M.A.F., R.S. Parnell, and B.S. Grant. 2008. A Reversible Color Polyphenism in American Peppered Moth (Biston betularia cognataria) Caterpillars. PLoS ONE 3(9):e3142 doi:10.1371/journal.pone.0003142 http://www.plosone.org/article/info%3Adoi%2F10.1371%2Fjournal.pone.0003142
- Grant, Bruce S. 2005. Industrial Melanism. In: Encyclopedia of Life Sciences. John Wiley & Sons, Ltd: Chichester www.els.net [doi:10.1038/npg.els.0004150]
- Grant, Bruce. 2004. 'Intentional Deception: Intelligent Design's Wedge of Creationism'. Skeptic 11: 84-86. http://www.skeptic.com/eskeptic/archives/2004/04-06-01.html
- Grant, B. S. 2004. 'Allelic melanism in American and British peppered moths'. Journal of Heredity 95:97-102.
- Grant, Bruce. 2003. 'Industrial melanism, vignette 10.3.' In: Newman, M.C. and M.A. Unger, Fundamentals of Ecotoxicology 2e. Boca Raton: Lewis Publishers 226-228.
- Grant, B. S. and L. L. Wiseman. 2002. 'Recent history of melanism in American peppered moths.' Journal of Heredity 93:86-90.
- Grant, Bruce S. 2002. 'Sour grapes of wrath.' Science 297:940-941.
- Cook, L. M. & B. S. Grant. 2000. 'Frequency of insularia during the decline in melanics in the peppered moth Biston betularia in Britain.' Heredity 85: 580-585.
- Grant, Bruce S. and Cyril A. Clarke, 1999. 'An examination of intraseasonal variation in the incidence of melanism in peppered moths, Biston betularia (Geometridae).' Journal of the Lepidopterists' Society 53: 99-103.
- Grant, Bruce S. 1999. 'Fine tuning the peppered moth paradigm.' Evolution 53: 980-984.
- Grant, B. S., A. D. Cook, C. A. Clarke, and D. F. Owen. 1998. 'Geographic and temporal variation in the incidence of melanism in peppered moth populations in America and Britain.' Journal of Heredity 89: 465-471.
- Grant, B. S., D. F. Owen, and C. A. Clarke. 1996. 'Parallel rise and fall of melanic peppered moths in America and Britain.' Journal of Heredity 87: 351-357.
- Grant, Bruce, Denis F. Owen and Cyril A. Clarke. 1995. Decline of melanic moths. Nature 373: 565.
- Asami, Takahiro and Bruce Grant. 1995. 'Melanism has not evolved in Japanese Biston betularia (Geometridae).' Journal of the Lepidopterists' Society 49: 88-91.
- Clarke, Cyril A., Bruce Grant, Frieda M.M. Clarke and Takahiro Asami, 1994. 'A long term assessment of Biston betularia (L.) in one UK locality (Caldy Common near West Kirby, Wirral), 1959-1993, and glimpses elsewhere.' Linnean 10: 18-26.
- Clarke, Cyril A., Frieda M.M. Clarke and Bruce Grant, 1993. 'Biston betularia (Geometridae), the peppered moth, in Wirral, England: an experiment in assembling.' Journal of the Lepidopterists' Society 47: 17-21.
- Grant, Bruce and Rory J. Howlett. 1988. 'Background selection by the peppered moth (Biston betularia Linn.): individual differences.' Biological Journal of the Linnean Society 33: 217-232.
