= Bernard Kettlewell =

British lepidopterist (1907–1979)

Henry Bernard Kettlewell
- Born: Henry Bernard Davis Kettlewell; 24 February 1907; Howden, Yorkshire, England
- Died: 11 May 1979 (aged 72); Oxford, England
- Resting place: Steeple Barton; 51.922°N 1.351°W
- Education: Gonville and Caius College, Cambridge
- Known for: Peppered moth evolution
- Awards: Darwin Medal (USSR); Mendel Medal (Czechoslovakia)
- Scientific career
- Fields: Medicine, zoology
- Workplaces: St Bartholomew's Hospital; St. Luke's Hospital; Woking War Hospital; Cape Town University; Oxford University
- Academic advisors: E. B. Ford

Henry Bernard Davis Kettlewell (24 February 1907 – 11 May 1979) was a British geneticist, lepidopterist and medical doctor, who performed research on the influence of industrial melanism on peppered moth (Biston betularia) coloration, showing why moths are darker in polluted areas. This experiment is cited as a classic demonstration of natural selection in action. After live video record of the experiment with Niko Tinbergen, Sewall Wright called the study as "the clearest case in which a conspicuous evolutionary process has actually been observed."

== Early life ==
Kettlewell was born in Howden, Yorkshire, and educated at Charterhouse School. During 1926 he studied medicine and zoology at Gonville and Caius College, Cambridge. During 1929 he began clinical training at St Bartholomew's Hospital, London, then during 1935 joined a general medical practice in Cranleigh, Surrey. He also worked as an anaesthetist at St. Luke's Hospital, Guildford. During World War II, from 1939 to 1945, he worked for the Emergency Medical Service at Woking War Hospital.

He emigrated to South Africa during 1949, and from then until 1954 was a researcher at the International Locust Control Centre at Cape Town University, investigating methods of locust control and going on expeditions to the Kalahari Desert, the Knysna Forest, the Belgian Congo, and Mozambique.

During 1952 he was appointed to a Nuffield Research Fellowship in the Department of Genetics of the Department of Zoology at Oxford University. Until 1954 he divided his time between South Africa and Oxford, then he gained the position of Senior Research Officer of the Department of Genetics and spent the rest of his career in Oxford as a genetics researcher. He was assigned to investigate peppered moth evolution under the supervision of E. B. Ford.

== Peppered moth experiments ==
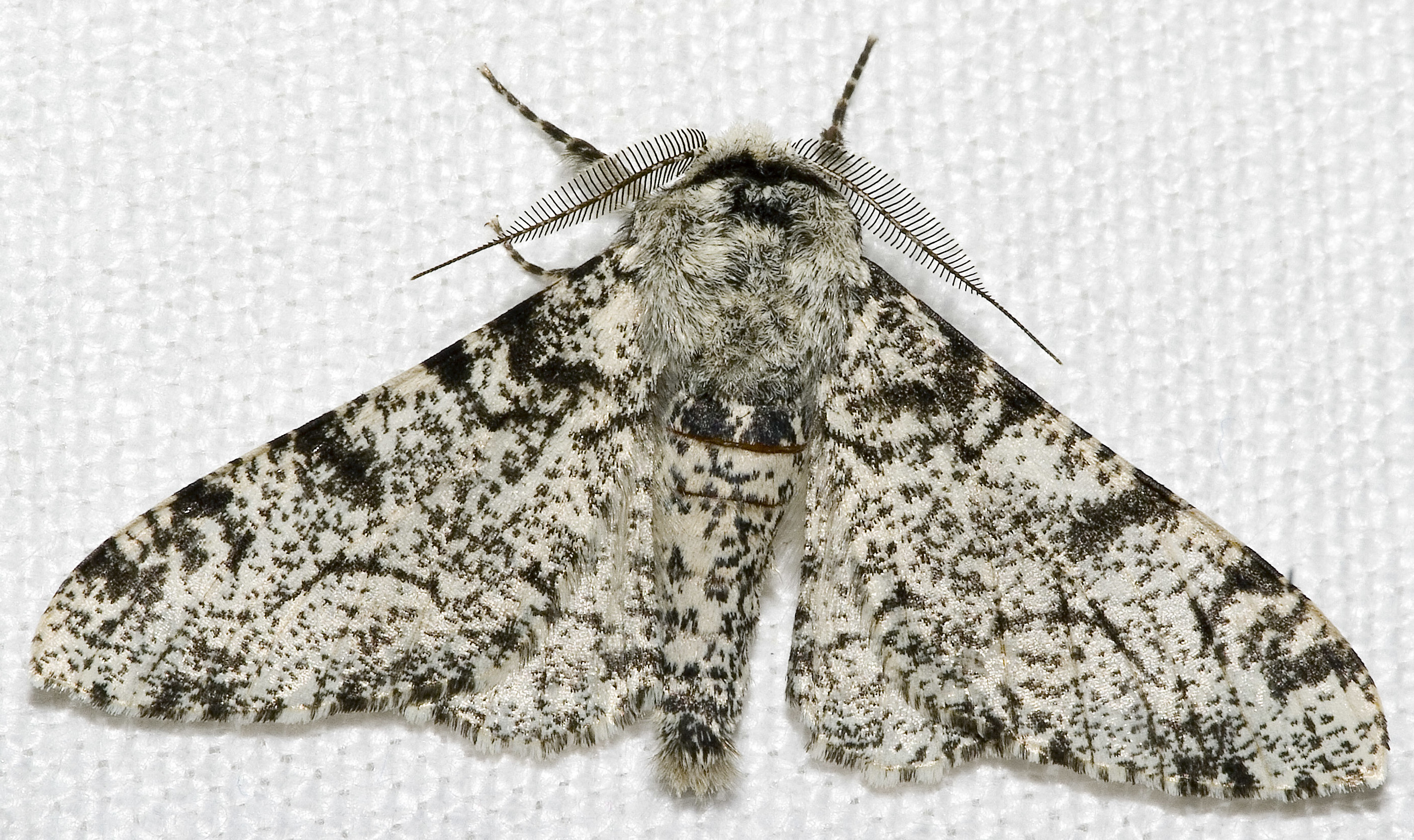
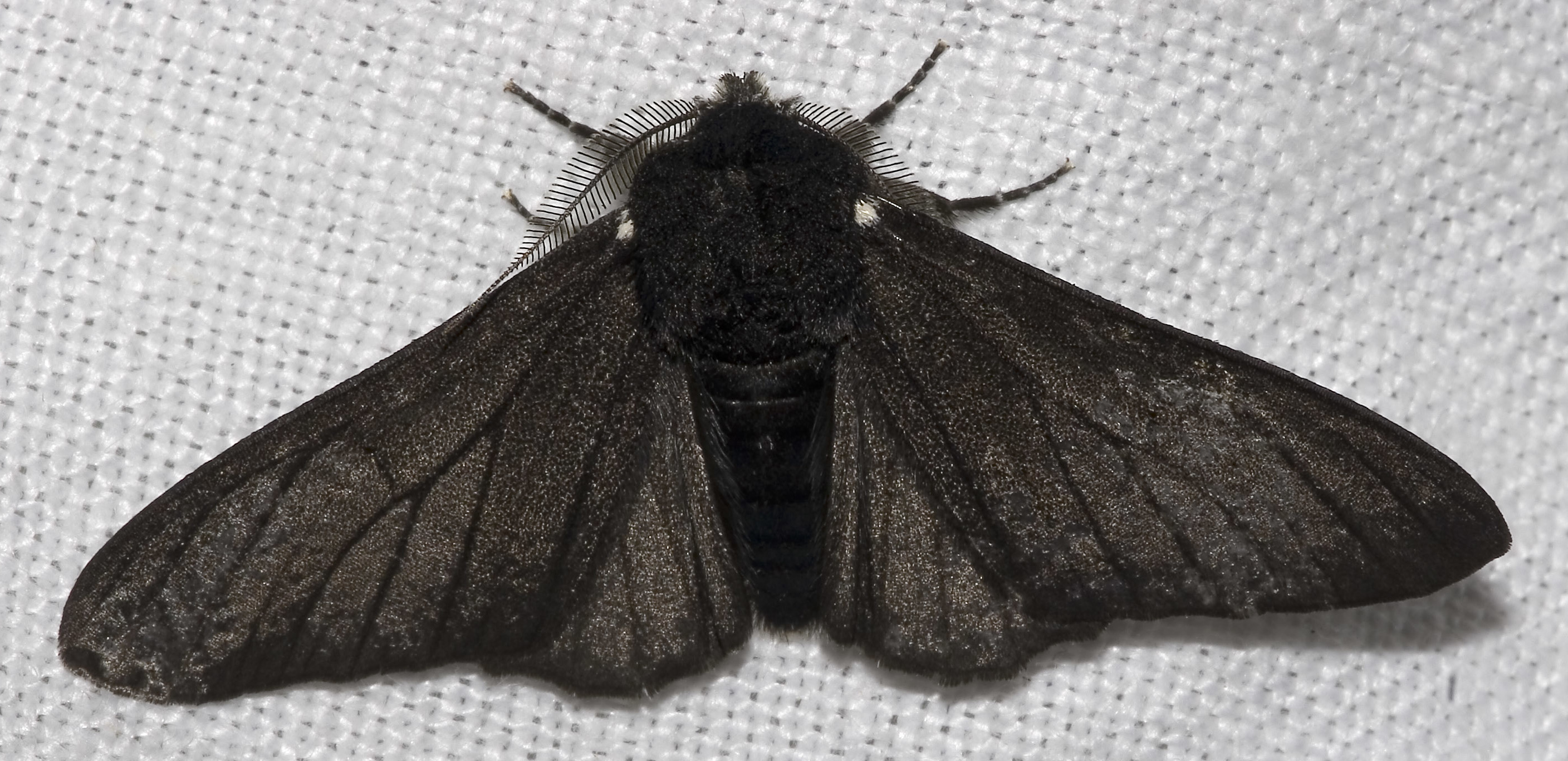
Biston betularia, the peppered moth, in typical and melanic forms

His grant was to study industrial melanism in general and in particular the peppered moth Biston betularia which had been studied by William Bateson during the 1890s. Kettlewell's research from three surveys between 1952 and 1972 seemed to show a static pattern with a high frequency of the dark-coloured carbonaria phenotype in industrial regions, and the light coloured typica moths the most common in more rural areas. In the first of Kettlewell's experiments moths were released into an aviary to observe how insectivorous birds reacted. He showed that the birds ate the moths, and found that if the camouflage of the moths made them difficult for him to see against a matching background, the birds too had difficulty in finding the moths. Most famously he then performed experiments involving releasing and then recapturing marked moths in polluted woodlands in Birmingham, and in unpolluted rural woods at Deanend Wood, Dorset, England. He demonstrated experimentally the efficiency of natural selection as an evolutionary force: light-coloured moths are more conspicuous than dark-coloured ones in industrial areas, where the vegetation is darkened by pollution, and are therefore easier prey for birds, but are less conspicuous in unpolluted rural areas, where the vegetation is lighter in colour, and therefore survive predation better. His experiment resulted in better understanding of industrial melanism and its effects on the evolution of species, and can be seen as an important example of urban evolution.

=== Criticism ===
J. B. S. Haldane was of the opinion that Kettlewell had attempted to capitalise on Haldane's own observations, made as early as 1924, of the statistical probability of rate of change from light to melanic forms of the peppered moth. In 1961, Haldane and his graduate student (and later wife) Helen Spurway told Canadian lepidopterist Gary Botting that they questioned Kettlewell's data since it too "nicely" approximated Haldane's 1924 statistical calculations. Botting and Haldane at that time shared the opinion that some genetic mechanism other than bird predation was at work. However see also for a re-appraisal of Haldane's views.

The major argument was made by Theodore David Sargent, professor of zoology at the University of Massachusetts at Amherst. He reported that during 1965–1969 he attempted to perform similar experiment, and found that birds did not have preference on moth on either black or white tree trunks. He suspected that Kettlewell trained the birds to pick moths on tree trunk, where they were not normally present.

=== Of Moths and Men ===
Further criticism of Kettlewell's peppered moth research came from Judith Hooper in her 2002 book Of Moths and Men, in which she claims that Kettlewell's field notes could never be found and his experiments were fraudulent, reiterating Sargent's allegations that the experimental photographs were faked by planting dead moths on a log. She accuses Ford of being a Darwinian zealot who exploited Kettlewell's servitude and criticises scientists in general for credulous and biased acceptance of evolution.

A review in EMBO Reports describes the book as "Hooper's exhilarating account of the public and private lives of an opinionated and powerful group of evolutionists, who contributed to this shameful episode in the study of evolution." The book has also been widely quoted by creationists. However, Hooper's various allegations have been refuted by the scientific community: David W Rudge summarised that "none of Hooper's arguments is found to withstand careful scrutiny" and that all "these charges are baseless and stem from a fundamental misunderstanding of the nature of science as a process."

=== Further research vindicating Kettlewell's work ===
Kettlewell's experiments have been vindicated by elaborate research, and the genetic details of the evolutionary process established.

Michael Majerus carried out extensive experiments, examining moths in the wild, to re-examine the findings of Kettlewell's experiments in the light of subsequent questions. His work, published posthumously in 2012, provided new data which answered criticisms and validated Kettlewell's methodology. Their analysis reaffirmed Kettlewell's conclusion that differential selection by birds using their eyesight to find prey was sufficient to explain the changes in melanism, and that this demonstrated the effectiveness of natural selection as an evolutionary force.

== Death ==
Because of vigorous field research, Kettlewell suffered from bronchitis, pneumonia, pleurisy and flu, along with heart problems. He fell off a birch tree in 1978 while conducting a field collection and fractured two vertebrae in his back. He never recovered from the injury. On 11 May 1979, he died, allegedly of an accidental overdose of a painkiller.

== Awards and honours ==
- Darwin Medal (USSR) in 1959
- Mendel Medal (Czechoslovakia) in 1965
- Official Fellow of Iffley College (later Wolfson College) in 1965
- Elected Emeritus Fellow of Wolfson College 1974
