= Judith Hooper =

American journalist

- Born: 15 April 1949 (age 76); San Francisco, California
- Occupation: Journalist
- Known for: Of Moths and Men
- Spouse: Dick Teresi

Judith Hooper (born April 15, 1949, in San Francisco, California) is an American journalist.

Hooper has worked as an editor and writer for the magazine Omni. With her husband, Dick Teresi, she co-wrote the books The Three-Pound Universe (1986) and Would the Buddha Wear a Walkman? A Catalogue of Revolutionary Tools for Higher Consciousness (1990). She is also the author of the controversial Of Moths and Men (2002), which argues that the peppered moth experiments carried out by Bernard Kettlewell were flawed. Hooper writes in the book's prologue, "I am not a creationist, but to be uncritical about science is to make it into a dogma." However, geneticist Michael Majerus has taken issue with many of Hooper's claims about Kettlewell, concluding that she misunderstood natural selection and the details of peppered moth predation.

== Bibliography ==
- Of Moths and Men, 2002
- Alice in bed, a novel, 2015
