= Of Moths and Men =

2002 book by Judith Hooper

- Cover of the British edition, showing a display cabinet with the peppered moth removed
- Author: Judith Hooper
- Language: English
- Publisher: Norton
- Publication date: 2002
- Pages: 377
- ISBN: 0-393-05121-8
- OCLC: 50022818
- Dewey Decimal: 576.8/2/092 B 21
- LC Class: QH375 .H66 2002

Of Moths and Men is a book by journalist Judith Hooper about the Oxford University ecological genetics school led by E.B. Ford. The book specifically concerns Bernard Kettlewell's experiments on the peppered moth which were intended as experimental validation of evolution. She highlights supposed problems with the methodology of Kettlewell's experiments and suggests that these issues could invalidate the results obtained, ignoring or disparaging evidence supporting natural selection while repeatedly implying that Kettlewell and his colleagues committed fraud or made careless errors.

Subject matter experts have described the book as presenting a "conspiracy theory" with "errors, misrepresentations, misinterpretations and falsehoods". The evolutionary biologist Michael Majerus spent the last 7 years of his life systematically repeating Kettlewell's experiments, demonstrating that Kettlewell had in fact been correct.

== Allegations of poor experimental practice ==
In the book, Hooper alleges multiple flaws in experimental methodology, including gluing the moths in place on parts of trees where they would not naturally settle, feeding birds heavily enough to condition them to expect feeding at that point, artificially boosting recapture rates, altering experiments (unconsciously) to favour the expected outcome, and errors in statistical analysis.

== Rebuttals by experts ==
The book was described as well-written in reviews in the mainstream press, but severely criticised in scientific publications.

The historian of biology David Rudge has carefully reexamined the records upon which Hooper's argument is based. He concluded that her historical research had been poor, and that she had shown fundamental misunderstandings about the nature of science.

Writing in Nature in 2002, the evolutionary biologist Jerry Coyne attacked Hooper's "flimsy conspiracy theory [of] ambitious scientists who will ignore the truth for the sake of fame and recognition [by which] she unfairly smears a brilliant naturalist".

In Science, Bruce S. Grant, also writing in 2002, critically summarised the book's content. In his view it had failed to distinguish evidence (showing that natural selection occurs) from mechanism (how it operates). He stated that there was an enormous amount of evidence for "changes in allele frequency in peppered moth populations" for which natural selection was the only explanation. He wrote that "What it delivers is a quasi-scientific assessment of the evidence for natural selection in the peppered moth (Biston betularia), much of which is cast in doubt by the author's relentless suspicion of fraud".

The geneticist Bryan Clarke, who had worked alongside Bernard Kettlewell at Oxford, described Hooper's book as "a treasury of insinuations worthy of an unscrupulous newspaper".

The entomologist and expert on peppered moth evolution Michael Majerus described the book as "littered with errors, misrepresentations, misinterpretations and falsehoods". He spent the last 7 years of his life on research, systematically refuting Hooper's claims. Much of the work was published posthumously, the data being reviewed by a team of evolutionary biologists, leading to a vindication of Kettlewell's findings, the re-establishment of his reputation, and the restoration of the peppered moth as an exemplar of Darwinian evolution.
