= Libby Houston =

British botanist (born 1941)

- Born: Elizabeth Maynard Houston; 1941 (age 84–85); North London, England
- Education: Lady Margaret Hall, Oxford; University of Bristol
- Occupations: Poet, botanist
- Spouse: Mal Dean
- Children: Two children, Sam and Alice, and six grandchildren
- Awards: H. H. Bloomer Award; Marsh Botany Award

Libby Houston (born 1941) is an English poet and botanist. The native of North London has published several collections of poetry. Houston, a research associate at the School of Biological Sciences at the University of Bristol, has discovered several new species of whitebeam (Sorbus), one of which has been given her name. In addition to membership in several organisations related to botany, Houston is a participant in the Avon Gorge & Downs Wildlife Project. She was the recipient of the H. H. Bloomer medal in 2012. The award from the Linnean Society of London acknowledged her contribution to natural history, in particular, the body of knowledge of whitebeams in Britain, and the flora of Avon Gorge in Bristol, England. In 2018, she was recipient of the Marsh Botany Award, in recognition of lifetime achievement in the field.

== Early life ==
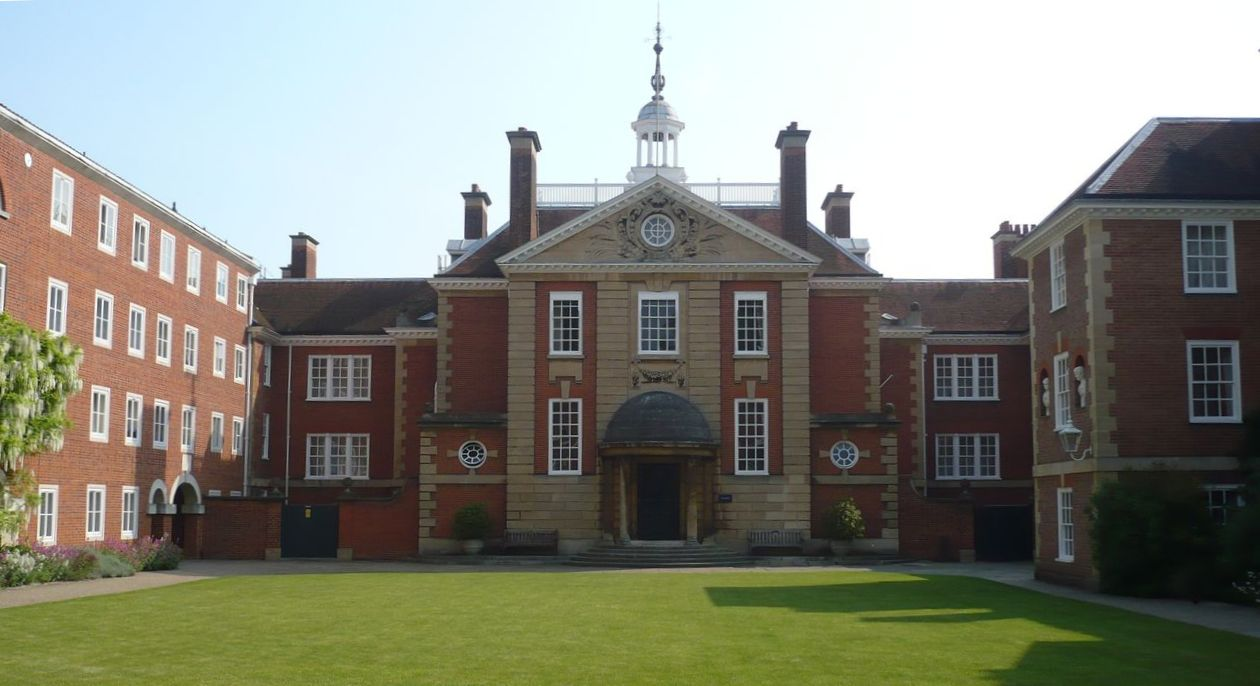
Lady Margaret Hall, Oxford

Libby Houston was born Elizabeth Maynard Houston in North London, England, and was raised in the West Country. She was educated at Lady Margaret Hall of the University of Oxford. In 1966, she married illustrator and musician Malcolm Dean in Somerset.

Houston published her first collection of poetry, A Stained Glass Raree Show, in 1967, followed by Plain Clothes in 1971, At the Mercy in 1980 (all with Allison & Busby), Necessity in 1988 (Slow Dancer), A Little Treachery in 1990 (Circle Press), and All Change in 1993 (Oxford University Press). She has appeared on BBC radio broadcasts for children since the early 1970s.

She was widowed in 1974, and married Roderick Jewell in 1979, moving that year to Bristol. Houston received a certificate in Science Biology from the University of Bristol.

== Research at the University of Bristol ==
In 2012, Houston was a research associate in the School of Biological Sciences at the University of Bristol, assisting Lewis Frost with his study of the flora of Avon Gorge in Bristol. Her skill at rock-climbing was essential to reach the plants, including spiked speedwell (Veronica spicata) and Bristol rockcress (Arabis scabra). More recently she worked with Simon Hiscock, then Professor of Botany at the School of Biological Sciences at the University of Bristol, as well as with Tim Rich, then head of the vascular plant section at the National Museum Wales on Avon Gorge whitebeams (Sorbus).

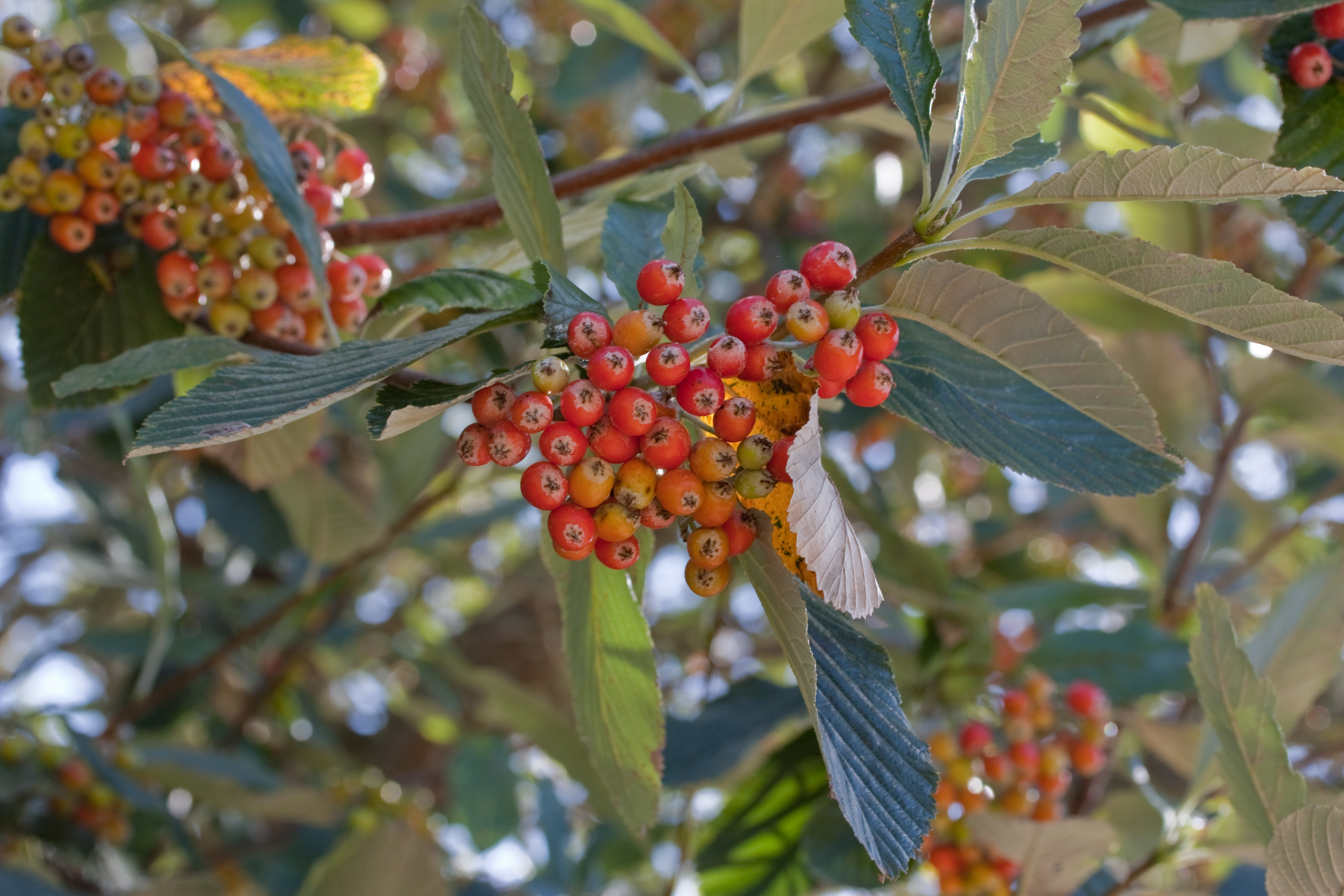
Houston's whitebeam (Sorbus x houstoniae), a hybrid of common whitebeam (Sorbus aria) (above) and Bristol whitebeam (Sorbus bristoliensis)

She discovered a new hybrid of the tree, to which her name has been given, on a cliff of the Avon Gorge in 2005. Houston found the rare Houston's whitebeam (Sorbus x houstoniae), a hybrid between the common whitebeam (Sorbus aria) and the Bristol whitebeam (Sorbus bristoliensis). The single existing example which has been found is only accessible with ropes. The Houston's whitebeam was one of fourteen new whitebeam trees officially named in the February 2009 issue of Watsonia, the journal of the Botanical Society of the British Isles. Five of those new trees were discovered in Bristol. Houston's research also included the Wye Valley, where she discovered three of the new whitebeams.

Houston is a member of the Bristol Naturalists' Society, the Botanical Society of Britain and Ireland, and the Somerset Rare Plants Group. In April 2012, she participated in an exhibition at Bradbury Hall, Henleaze, Bristol, celebrating the 150th anniversary of the Bristol Naturalists' Society. She was also a participant in the Avon Gorge & Downs Wildlife Project, which was established in 1999 to protect the Bristol side of the Avon Gorge and Downs and to increase awareness of the site.

== Awards ==
In 2012, Houston was awarded the H. H. Bloomer Award from the Linnean Society of London for her contribution to natural history, in particular of the Avon Gorge flora and British whitebeams. The silver medal is awarded by the society to an "amateur naturalist who has made an important contribution to biological knowledge."

In 2018, she was awarded the Marsh Botany Award in recognition of her contribution to the knowledge of the flora of the Avon Gorge, and particularly Sorbus species.

== Bibliography ==
- A Stained Glass Raree Show, Allison & Busby, 1967
- Plain Clothes, Allison & Busby, 1971
- At the Mercy, Allison & Busby, 1980
- Necessity, Slow Dancer Press, 1988
- A Little Treachery, Circle Press Publications, 1990
- All Change, Oxford University Press, 1993
- Cover of Darkness: Selected Poems, 1961–1998, Slow Dancer Press, 2000
