= Aria houstoniae =

Scientific classification
- Kingdom: Plantae
- Clade: Tracheophytes
- Clade: Angiosperms
- Clade: Eudicots
- Clade: Rosids
- Order: Rosales
- Family: Rosaceae
- Genus: Aria
- Species: A. houstoniae

Binomial name
- Aria houstoniae (T.C.G.Rich) Mosyakin, Fedor. & McNeill

Synonyms
- Karpatiosorbus houstoniae (T.C.G.Rich) Sennikov & Kurtto; Pyrus houstoniae (T.C.G.Rich) M.F.Fay & Christenh.; Sorbus houstoniae T.C.G.Rich

Species of tree

Aria houstoniae, or Houston's whitebeam, is a hybrid of two deciduous trees: the common whitebeam (Aria edulis) and the Bristol whitebeam (Aria bristoliensis). Only a single example of the hybrid is known to exist, at the Avon Gorge in Bristol, England. The only specimen grows on a cliff below Stokeleigh Camp at Leigh Woods in North Somerset and cannot be accessed without ropes.

== Description ==
The specimen is a small tree, at least 5 metres (16 ft) in height. Buds are oval to conical. The leaves of Houston's whitebeam have a similarity to those of Bristol whitebeam, although they are wider. The leaves are teardrop-shaped to teardrop-oval, and about 1.5 times as long as wide, with an apex that tapers to a long point and a base that is relatively wide. The leaves are shallowly, acutely lobed, 7–14% of the way to the central vein. The leaf margins are weakly doubly serrate.

The upper surface is dark green and hairless, the lower greenish-white with matted plant hairs and between 17 and 22 veins that project at an angle of 32 to 39 degrees from the central vein. The petioles are 8 to 20 mm (0.31 to 0.79 in) in length. The inflorescence measures up to 8 cm (3.1 in) in diameter, with individual flowers 16–18 mm (0.63–0.71 in) in diameter. The fragrant flowers have sepals that are narrow and triangular, and white petals that are widely oval to nearly round, 5.5–7.5 mm (0.22–0.30 in) x 5.5–6 mm (0.22–0.24 in). The stamens are pink. The fruit are generally round, the largest up to 15 mm (0.59 in) in diameter; mature fruit are orange-red with fully formed seeds. There is a moderate number of lenticels.

== Discovery ==
Houston's whitebeam was discovered by Libby Houston, a research associate at the University of Bristol School of Biological Sciences. The rock climber found the rare hybrid on a Carboniferous Limestone cliff at Avon Gorge in 2005. DNA analysis of nuclear microsatellites at the University of Bristol was performed and confirmed the nature of the new hybrid. The tree was officially named after Houston in February 2009 in Volume 27, Part 3 of Watsonia, the journal of the Botanical Society of the British Isles. It is a member of the Aria latifolia group.

The Somerset Rare Plants Group indicates that the tree's Red List status is critically endangered, although the site of the International Union for Conservation of Nature (IUCN) indicates that the tree has not yet been assessed for the list, but is in the Catalogue of Life. The short film, Houston's Whitebeam (link below), which related the discovery of the tree, was a finalist in the ONSIGHT & Panasonic contest "Bristol's Best Kept Secret" at the Wildscreen Film Festival in 2008. The filmmaker proposed that Houston's whitebeam was Bristol's best kept secret. The festival, hosted every two years by Bristol, was founded in 1982 and is dedicated to "celebrating, applauding and encouraging excellence and responsibility within the wildlife and environmental filmmaking industry."
