= Watsonia =

Watsonia can refer to:

- Watsonia (gastropod), a genus of sea snails in the family Caecidae
- Watsonia (plant), a genus of flowering plants in the iris family
- Watsonia (journal), now the New Journal of Botany
- Watsonia, Victoria, a suburb of Melbourne, Australia
  - Watsonia railway station
