= Job Edward Lousley =

English banker and amateur botanist (1907–1976)

- Born: 18 September 1907; Clapham, London, England
- Died: 6 January 1976 (aged 68); Streatham Common, London, England
- Known for: Alien flora of Britain; Author of the Flora of the Isles of Scilly and Wild Flowers of Chalk and Limestone
- Awards: H. H. Bloomer Award (1963)
- Scientific career
- Fields: Botany
- Institutions: South London Botanical Institute; British Naturalists' Association; BSBI; Barclays Bank

Job Edward Lousley (18 September 1907 – 6 January 1976) was an English banker and a renowned amateur botanist, who authored many publications, including Wild Flowers of Chalk and Limestone (Number 16) in the New Naturalist series and the first Flora of the Isles of Scilly, published in 1971.

== Early life and education ==
Job Edward Lousley was born in 1907 in Clapham, London, England, and was the only son of Jethro Lousley MBE (1882–1963) and Christine Clarke (c. 1880–1945), who was from a Huguenot family. He married Dorothy Winifred Thorpe (1913–2000) and they had one child, Margaret. He attended Strand Grammar School, Brixton, and Selhurst Grammar School, Norbury, and as a schoolboy, around the age of 12, he developed an interest in natural history. Along with a group of other like-minded schoolboys, he was invited to use the facilities of the South London Botanical Institute and to go on field trips, mainly in the Surrey countryside, with the then curator W. R. Sherrin whose main interest was bryophytes.

== Career ==
Lousley left school in April 1924 and worked for ten years for Barclays Bank in South London before moving to the City and working in the Stock Exchange, various city branches and the Trustee Department of Head Office. At the age of 19 he was serving on the council of the British Empire Naturalists Association. He also joined the Watson Botanical Exchange Club in 1926 and the Botanical Society and Exchange Club of the British Isles the following year. He was now meeting or corresponding with other botanists in Britain and gained a reputation for having an intimate knowledge of the British flora.

Lousley realised at an early age the need to specialise and chose docks (Rumex), a neglected group, which was to gain him an international reputation. He published two papers in 1939 and 1944 that settled the differences between Patience Dock (Rumex patientia) and Rumex cristatus and found aliens such as Rumex confertus hybridizing with native species. He named Rumex wrightii (R conglomeratus x R frutescens and R cuneifolius), as new to science. Up until the Second World War he gained his knowledge of the British flora by travelling to every part of the British Isles collecting what was to be the largest private herbarium in the British Isles. He first visited the Isles of Scilly in September 1936 and added Western Ramping–fumitory (Fumaria occidentalis) to the flora. He returned over the next four years covering every month from March to September and recording many additional species. The first manuscript of the flora was completed in 1941 and the work was finally published in 1971.

During the Second World War Lousley worked in London which gave him the chance to visit bombed sites and he went on to list species in the Square Mile. It led, in collaboration with Richard Fitter, to the Natural History of the City published in 1953 which listed 269 wild flowers, grasses and ferns. He was the first to discover American Willow–herb (Epilobium ciliatum) in 1945 which is now abundant in England. He also named a new hybrid Senecio discovered by N. Y. Sandwith which he named London Ragwort (Senecio x londinensis). With further work on plants introduced by the woollen industry in shoddy he became an authority on introductions.

In 1950, Lousley was author of Wild Flowers of Chalk and Limestone (No. 103 in the New Naturalist series) and in the same year he became the secretary of the BSBI, on the death of A. J. Wilmott. He was the honorary curator of the South London Botanical Institute (1955–68) and in 1963 he was the first recipient of the H. H. Bloomer Award of the Linnean Society of London. On retirement in 1967, at the age of 60, he was a Departmental Manager with Barclays Bank.

== Death ==
Lousley died in 1976 in Streatham Common, London. His herbarium was donated to the University of Reading, and some of his notebooks, photos, papers, letters and the manuscript of the flora of Scilly are held in the archives of the Isles of Scilly Museum.

== Publications ==
- J E Lousley. (1950) New Naturalist No 16. Wild Flowers of Chalk and Limestone. London: HarperCollins.
- J E Lousley. (1971) The Flora of the Isles of Scilly. Newton Abbot: David and Charles.
- J E Lousley and A C Leslie. (1976) Flora of Surrey with supplement. Newton Abbot: David and Charles.
- J E Lousley and D H Kent. (1981) Docks and Knotweeds. BSBI.
