= H. H. Bloomer Award =

Prize awarded by The Linnean Society of London

The H. H. Bloomer Award is an award of the Linnean Society, established in 1963 from a legacy by the amateur naturalist Harry Howard Bloomer, which is awarded to "an amateur naturalist who has made an important contribution to biological knowledge." The recipients, alternatively a botanist and a zoologist, are presented with a silver medal and a donation from the Fund.

== Recipients ==
Source (1963–present):

- 1963 - J.E. Lousley
- 1964 - C. E. Raven
- 1965 - E. C. Wallace
- 1966 - D. L. Harrison
- 1967 - A. G. Long
- 1968 - Miriam L. Rothschild
- 1969 - T. D. V. Swinscow
- 1970 - Arthur Erskine Ellis
- 1971 - J. G. Dony
- 1972 - Marie Åsberg
- 1973 - Ursula Katherine Duncan
- 1974 - A. F. Millidge & G. H. Locket
- 1975 - Eric Smoothey Edees
- 1976 - F. C. Stinton
- 1977 - D. H. Kent
- 1978 - Donovan Reginald Rosevear
- 1979 - Blanche Henrey
- 1980 - J. N. Eliot
- 1981 - David E. Allen
- 1982 - L. G. Higgins
- 1983 - O. V. Polunin
- 1984 - R. L. E. Ford
- 1985 - B. E. Smythies
- 1986 - Walter John Le Quesne
- 1987 - Malcolm Charles Clark
- 1988 - Roger D. Ransome
- 1989 - J. C. Gardiner
- 1990 - M. J. Roberts
- 1991 - Hugh D. Wilson
- 1992 - K. A. Spencer
- 1993 - David C. McClintock
- 1994 - Dennis Seaward
- 1995 - Betty E. G. M. Allen
- 1996 - John Henry Barrett
- 1997 - John R. I. Wood
- 1998 - William C. Wright
- 1999 - Richard H. Roberts
- 2000 - No award
- 2001 - Hans Hess
- 2002 - T. L. Blockeel & Sir Anthony Galsworthy
- 2003 - David Pearman
- 2004 - Rosemary FitzGerald
- 2005 - Peter Chandler
- 2006 - Eric J. Clement
- 2007 - John Tennent
- 2008 - Basil Harley
- 2009 - Markku Häkkinen
- 2010 - No award
- 2011 - Brendan Sayers & Michael Fibiger
- 2012 - Libby Houston
- 2013 - No award
- 2014 - Sir Christopher Lever
- 2015 - Robert Heckford
- 2016 - Howard Matcham
- 2017 - John Walters
- 2018 - Dan Danahar
- 2019 - Goronwy Wynne
- 2020 - Hans de Blauwe
- 2021 - David Lindo
- 2024 - Charley Eiseman
- 2025 - Aasheesh Pittie

== See also ==
- List of biology awards
