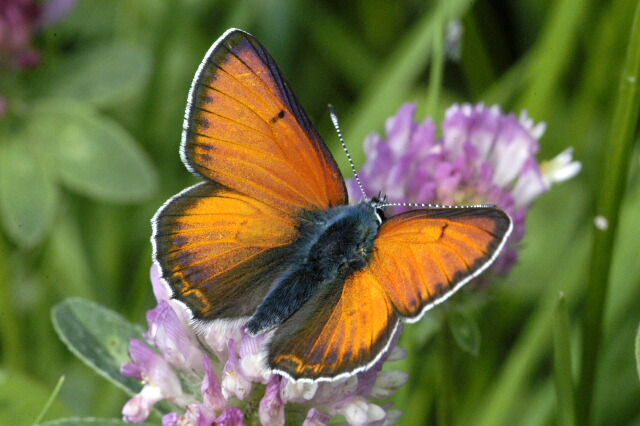
- Lycaena hippothoe. Male, upperface
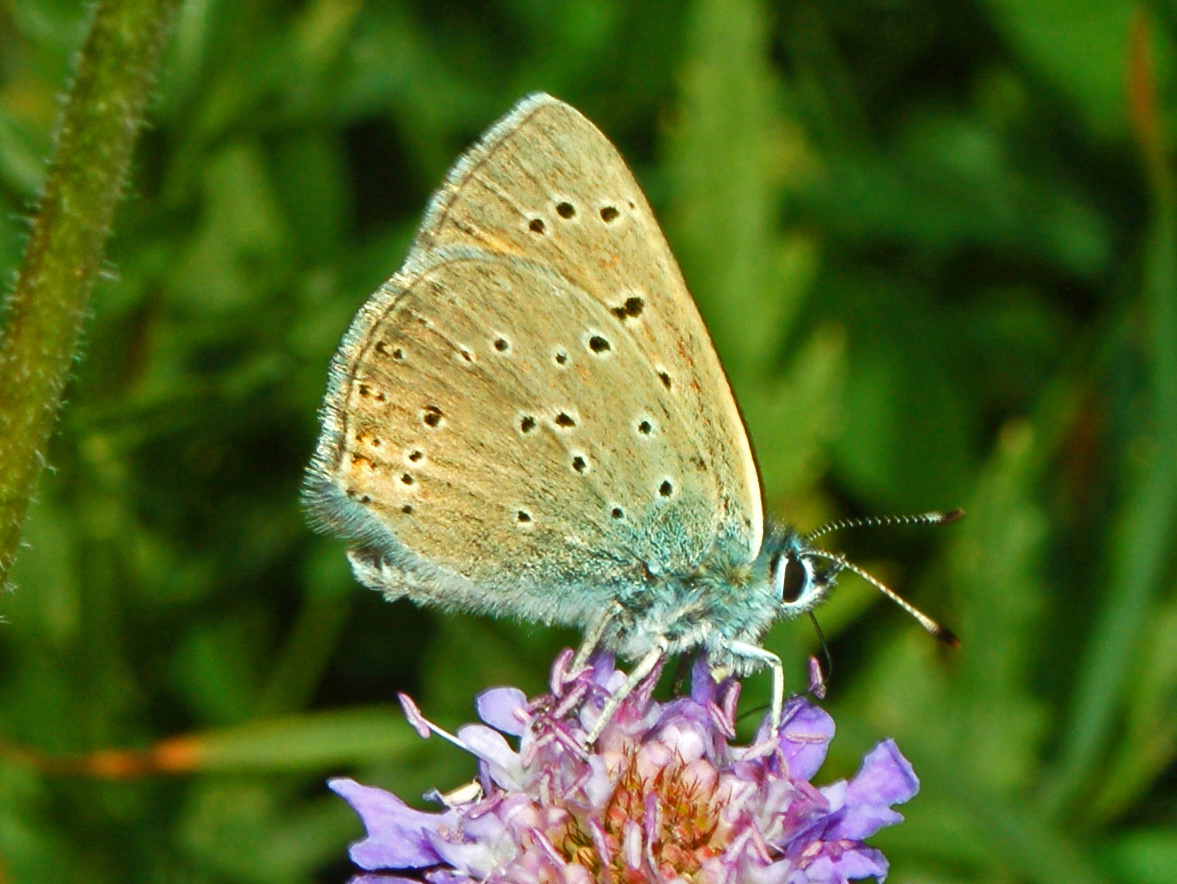
- Lycaena hippothoe eurydame. Male, underface

Scientific classification
- Kingdom: Animalia
- Phylum: Arthropoda
- Class: Insecta
- Order: Lepidoptera
- Family: Lycaenidae
- Genus: Lycaena
- Species: L. hippothoe

Binomial name
- Lycaena hippothoe (Linnaeus, 1761)

Synonyms
- List: Palaeochrysophanus hippothoe; Lycaena hippothoe (Linnaeus, 1761); Chrysophanus eurydame Hoffmansegg, 1806; Papilio eurybia Ochsenheimer, 1808; Polyommatus stiberi Gerhard, 1853

= Purple-edged copper =

Species of butterfly

The purple-edged copper (Lycaena hippothoe) is a butterfly of the family Lycaenidae.

== Sub-species ==
Subspecies include:

- Lycaena hippothoe hippothoe (Linnaeus, 1761)
- Lycaena hippothoe stiberi (Gerhard, 1853) – Scandinavia, Urals, Siberia.
- Lycaena hippothoe eurydame (Hoffmannsegg, 1806) – Alps.
- Lycaena hippothoe eurybia (Ochsenheimer, 1808) - (Altai Mountain, Sayan Mountains, Far East).
- Lycaena hippothoe amurensis (Staudinger, 1892) - (Transbaikalia, Amur River, Ussuri).
- Lycaena hippothoe cisalpina (Fruhstorfer, 1909)
- Lycaena hippothoe italica (Calberla, 1887) - (Italy)

Lycaena hippothoe eurydame is considered by some authors a valid species with the name of Lycaena euryname.

== Distribution ==
This species is present in the Western Europe and in Siberia up to the region of the river Amur.

== Habitat ==
It inhabits forest edges, swampy and damp meadows, clearings and river banks, at an elevation of 400–1,800 metres (1,300–5,900 ft) above sea level.

== Description ==
Lycaena hippothoe can reach a wingspan of 34–38 millimetres (1.3–1.5 in). The upperface of the wings is deep orange-red in males, with a brown or purple edging (hence the common name). The spots in the forewing post discal row form an arc. The female's appearance varies between subspecies, they are usually very dark brown, with brown spots on the forewings. The underside is virtually the same in both sexes. It is light orange and light brown with brown-black spots surrounded by white. The larvae are green and grow up to 20 millimeters long. This species is rather similar to Lycaena alciphron and Lycaena virgaureae.

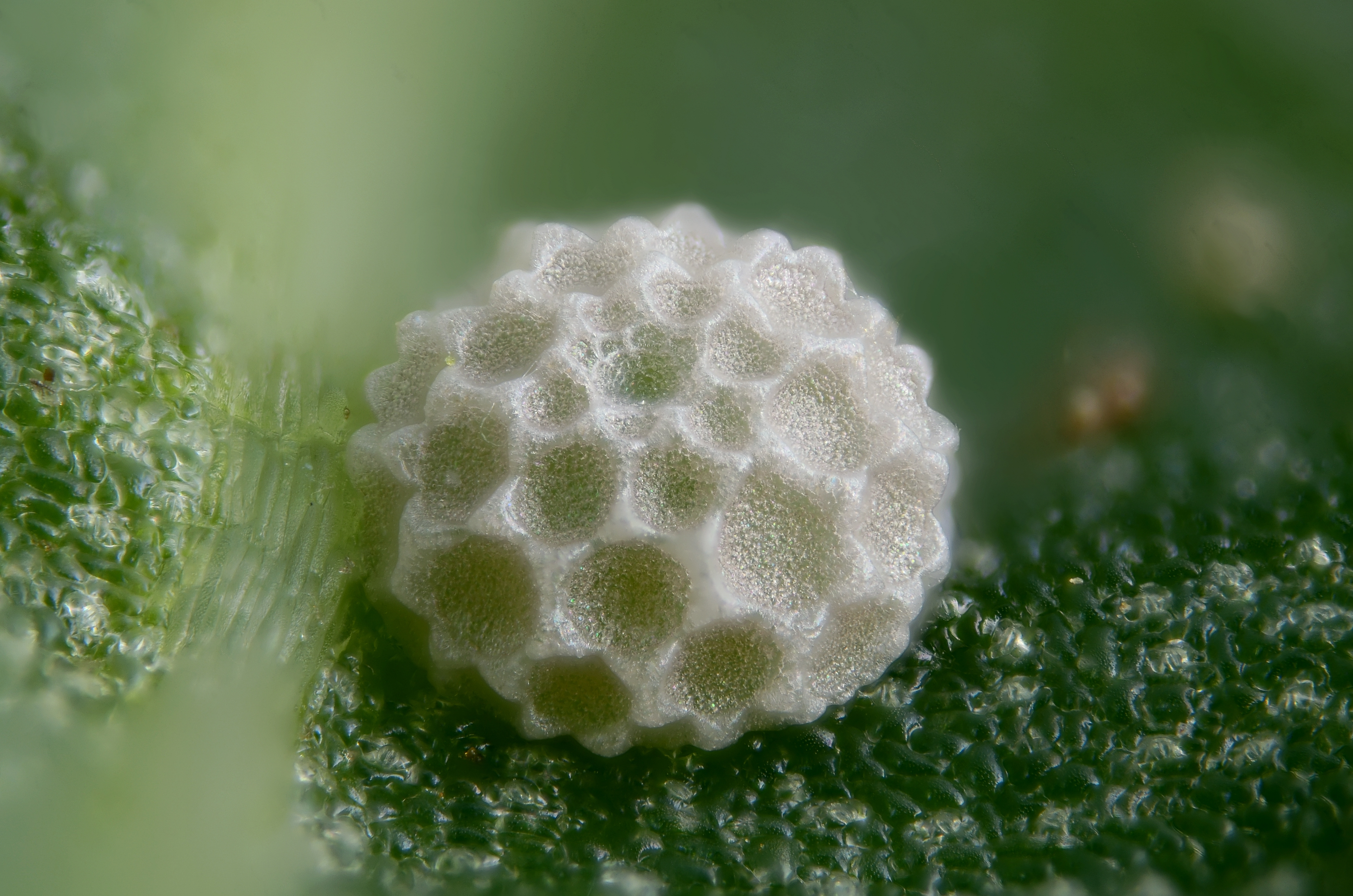
Egg

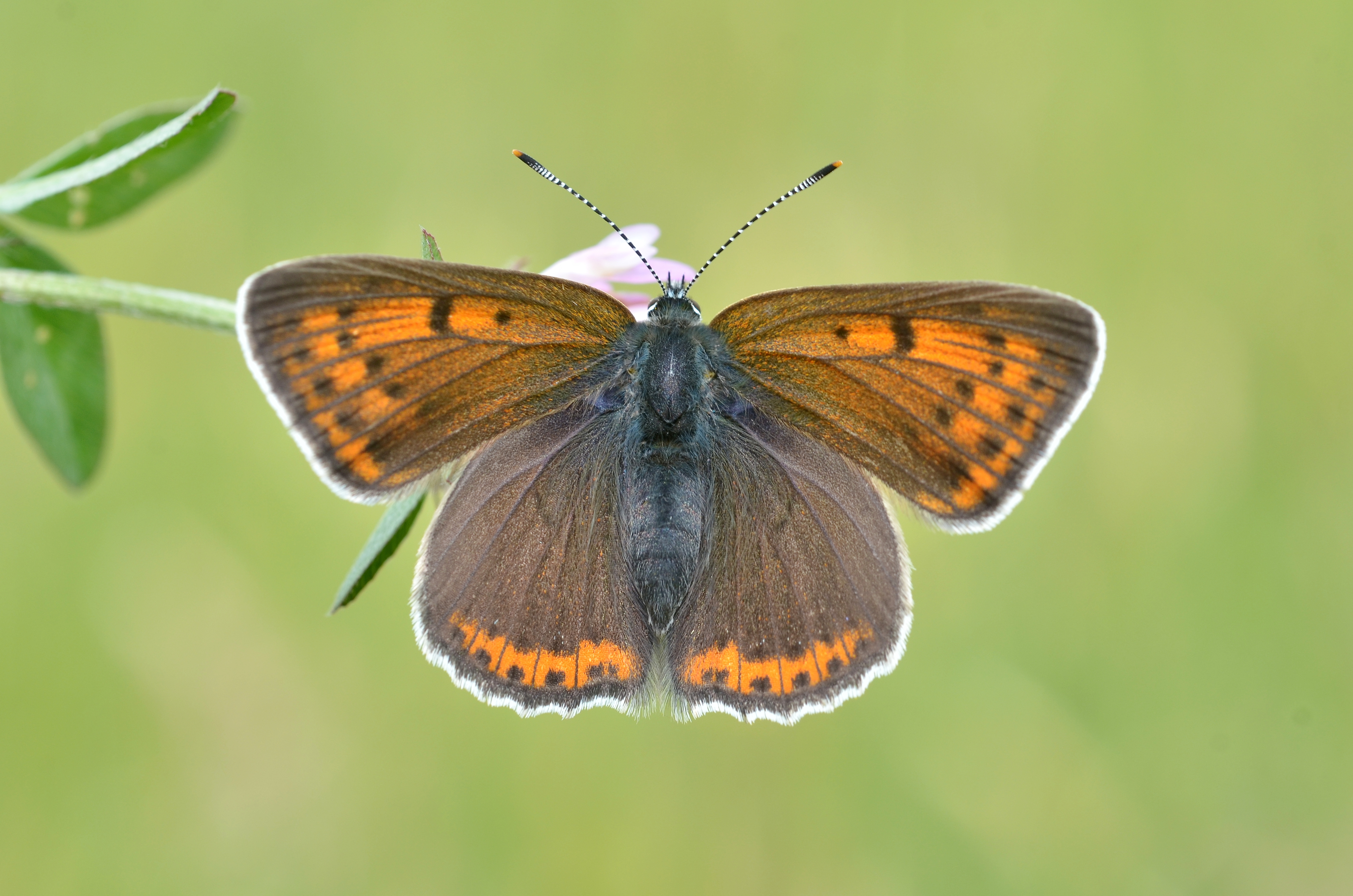
Female

== Biology ==
This species has one generation in June in northern and eastern Europe, two generations in May and then in July in southern Europe. Females lay eggs individually by June–July. Caterpillars feed on Rumex spp. (mainly on Rumex acetosella, Rumex acetosa, Rumex hydrolapathum, Rumex confertus) and Polygonum bistorta. Caterpillars hibernate after the first molt. They pupate on the ground. Adults fly from June–July to September.

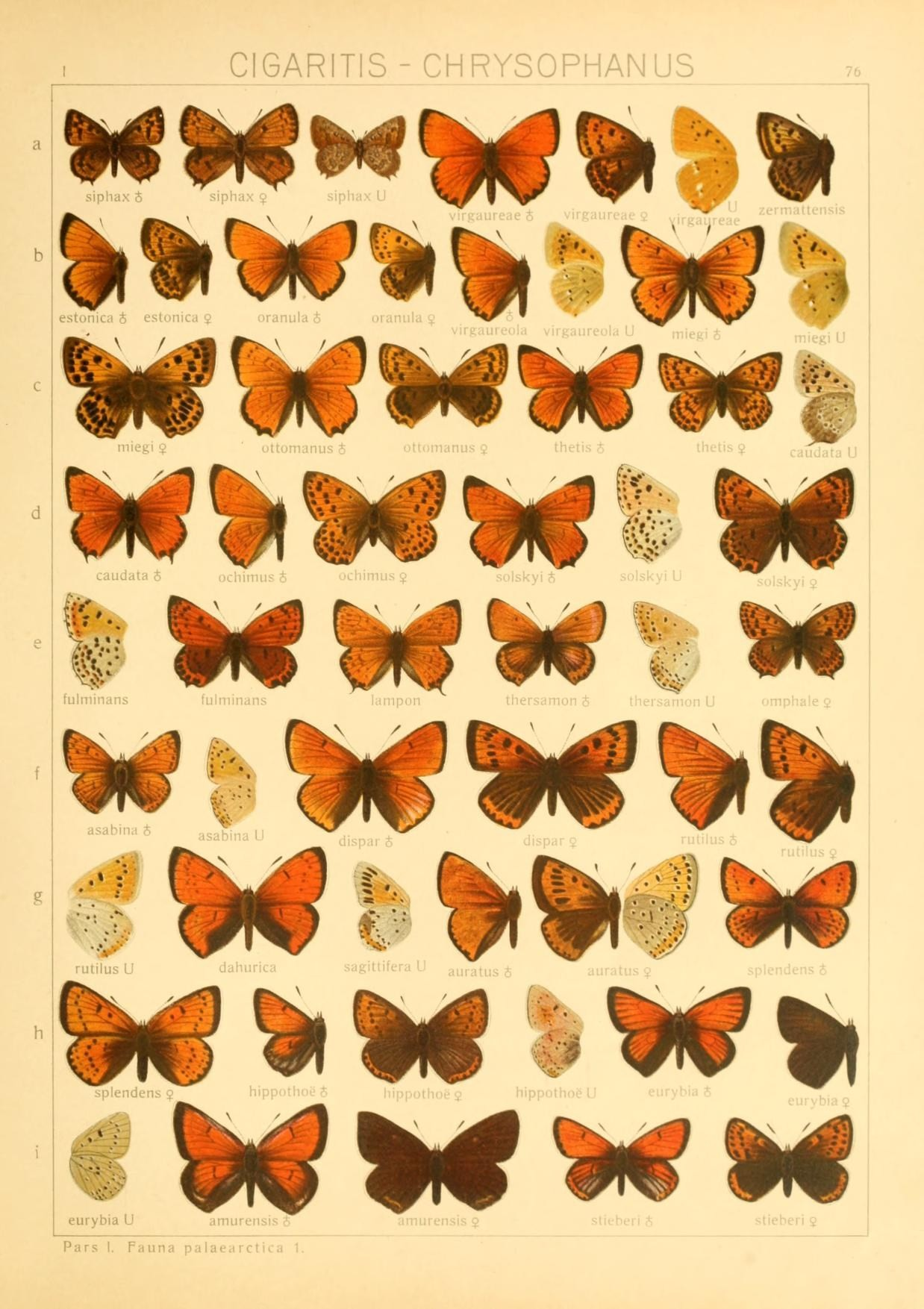
Seitz 76h, i

== Description from Seitz ==
C. hippothoe L. ( eurydice Rott., chryseis Bkh.) (76 h). Darker coppery golden with bluish sheen, both wings of the male broadly edged with black, inclusive of the costal margin of the forewing and the anal one of the hindwing; the female shaded with very dark. Underside almost uniformly grey, with numerous ocelli, the disc of the forewing being slightly yellowish. In North, Central and South Europe, sporadic, but common in many localities. Appears to be nowadays absent from England. Albinotic specimens have a whitish upperside with a sky-blue instead of violet-blue sheen in the males; this is ab. argenteola Schultz. The ocelli of the underside are sometimes reduced, the central ones (ab. decurtata Schultz) or the marginal ones (ab. orba Schultz), or all, especially often in eurybia (ab. extincta Gillm.). The spots also may be prolonged and united with one another (ab. confluens Gerh.) in every conceivable degree. — In the alpine form, eurybia O. (= eurydice Hbn.) (76 h) [now subspecies eurybia (Ochsenheimer, 1808)] the female is often entirely dark brown above with the markings hardly perceivable, being on the wing hardly recognizable as a Chrysophanus; only occasionally is the disc of the forewing above yellowish and glossy golden. The male has above a quite different, more red gloss. In the mountains of Switzerland and Scandinavia, also in the Altai and other Asiatic mountains. — The form italica Calb. [now subspecies italica (Calberla, 1887)], from the central and northern Apennines, is a transition from the typical form towards eurybia. The female is not quite dark brown above, the disc of the forewing having a stronger golden brown gloss. The discocellular spot is visible in the male but small. — An exaggerated form of eurybia with the upperside of the female deep dark brown is ab. nigra Favre. — amurensis Stgr. (76 i) [now subspecies amurensisis(Staudinger, 1892) a very large form from North China and Amurland; the female is very dark, bearing only in the anal area of the hindwing a narrow yellowish red half-band; the ocelli of the underside are strongly developed. — stieberi Gerh. (76 i) [now subspecies sieberi (Gerhard, 1853)] is the smaller form from North Europe with bright golden red ground-colour on the upperside of the female, the underside bearing usually a very distinct yellowish red submarginal band, which in the males is also very prominent on the upperside, whereas it is entirely absent from the males of hippothoe and eurybia. — candens H.-Schaff. [now species Lycaena candens] is the form inhabiting the Balkan Peninsula and Anterior Asia. The males have no blue sheen and the forewing above is entirely golden brown in the females; the black margin of the upperside is narrower in both sexes. — Ter Haar describes some specimens obtained by him at Groningen in the Netherlands which he says have the blue sheen peculiarly modified, being condensed in violet-blue streaks and dots; he calls this form from its habitat ab. groningana. — Larva velvety dark green with brown head, dark dorsal line and yellow lateral one; until the middle of May on Rumex. Pupa yellowish brown like leather, spotted with black; it lies free on the ground (Fryer). The butterflies appear at the end of May, in the northern districts a little later (early in June) and are found until late in July in luxuriant meadows, where they settle on umbellifers or in the grass, the males always with the wings half open. The localities are often of very small extent, sometimes being only a certain part of a meadow, where the species, however, is nearly always very plentiful. The females appear about 2 – 3 weeks after the males have commenced to fly. The form eurybia of the high Alps does not begin to fly before the very end of July and is on the wing into September; the northern stieberi also does not appear before July.

== Gallery ==
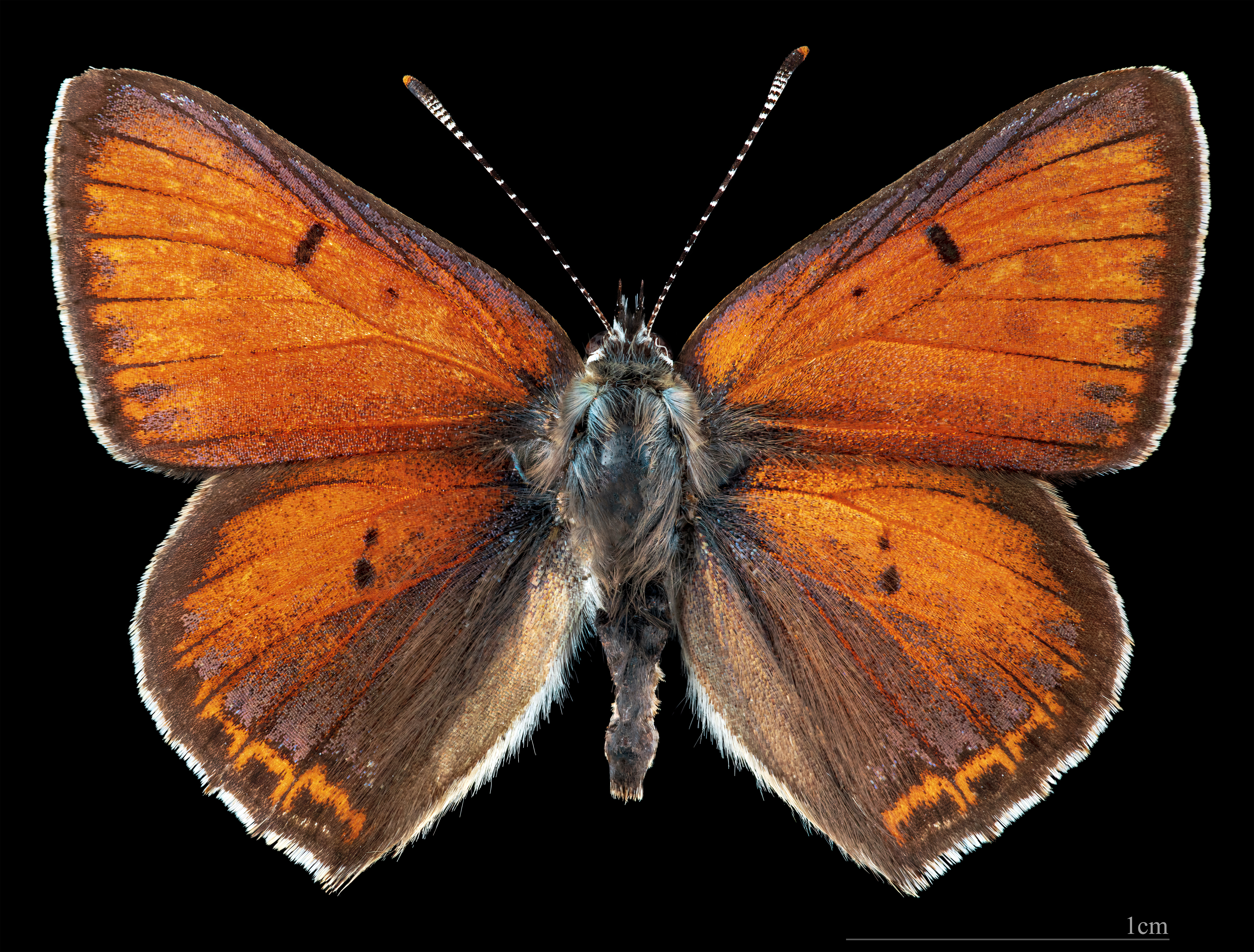
Lycaena hippothoe ♂

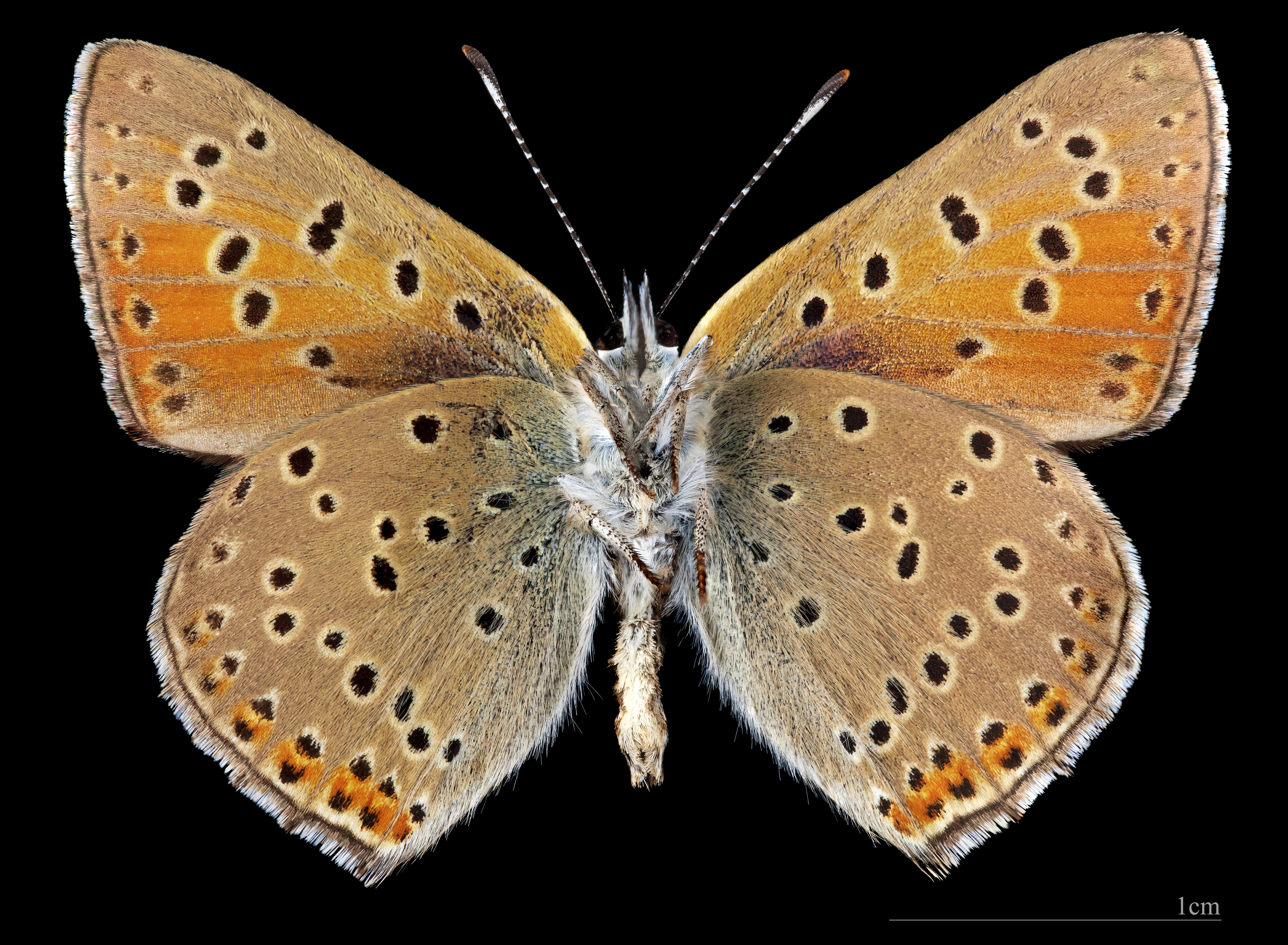
Lycaena hippothoe ♂ △

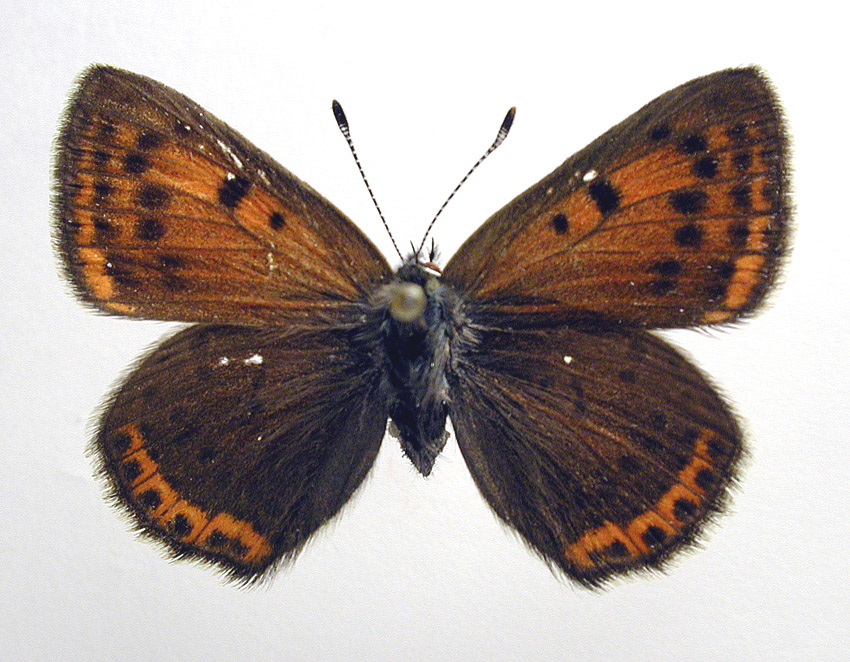
Female, recto

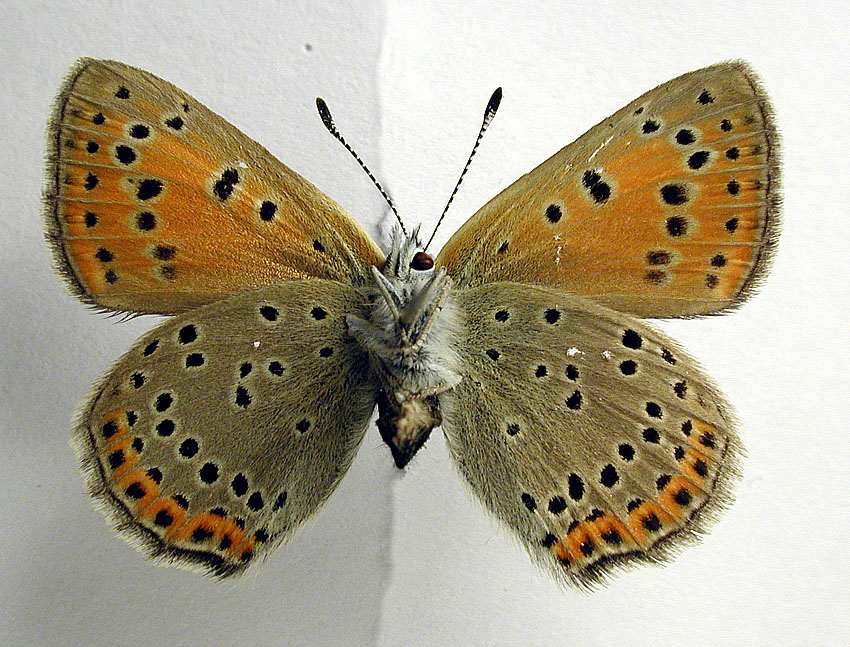
Female, verso
