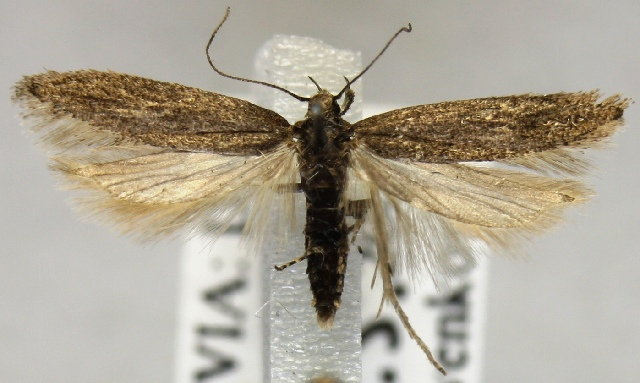

Scientific classification
- Kingdom: Animalia
- Phylum: Arthropoda
- Clade: Pancrustacea
- Class: Insecta
- Order: Lepidoptera
- Family: Gelechiidae
- Genus: Scrobipalpa
- Species: S. clintoni

Binomial name
- Scrobipalpa clintoni Povolný, 1968

Synonyms
- Scrobipalpa deleta Povolný, 1981; Scrobipalpa linella Piskunov, 1975

= Scrobipalpa clintoni =

Species of moth

Scrobipalpa clintoni, the Atlantic groundling, is a moth of the family Gelechiidae. It is found from north-western Europe to Latvia, Belarus, European Russia and Ukraine. The habitat consists of shingle beaches and sandy beaches.

The wingspan is 10–12 mm (0.39–0.47 in). Adults are on wing from May to June and again from July to August.

The larvae feed on Rumex crispus and Rumex confertus. They feed within the stem of their host plant. The species overwinters in the pupal stage.
