= Markku Häkkinen =

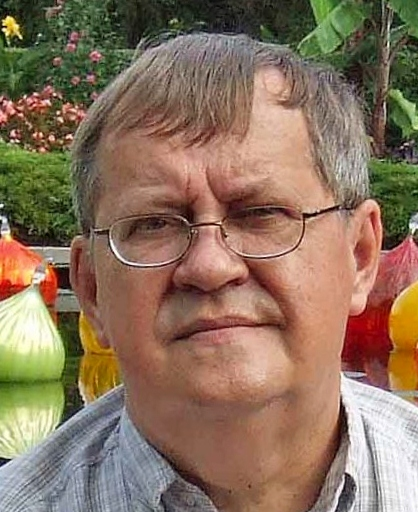
Markku Häkkinen

Markku Häkkinen (14 January 1946 – 5 December 2015) was a Finnish self-taught botanist, considered one of the world's leading experts on the taxonomy of bananas.

== Career ==
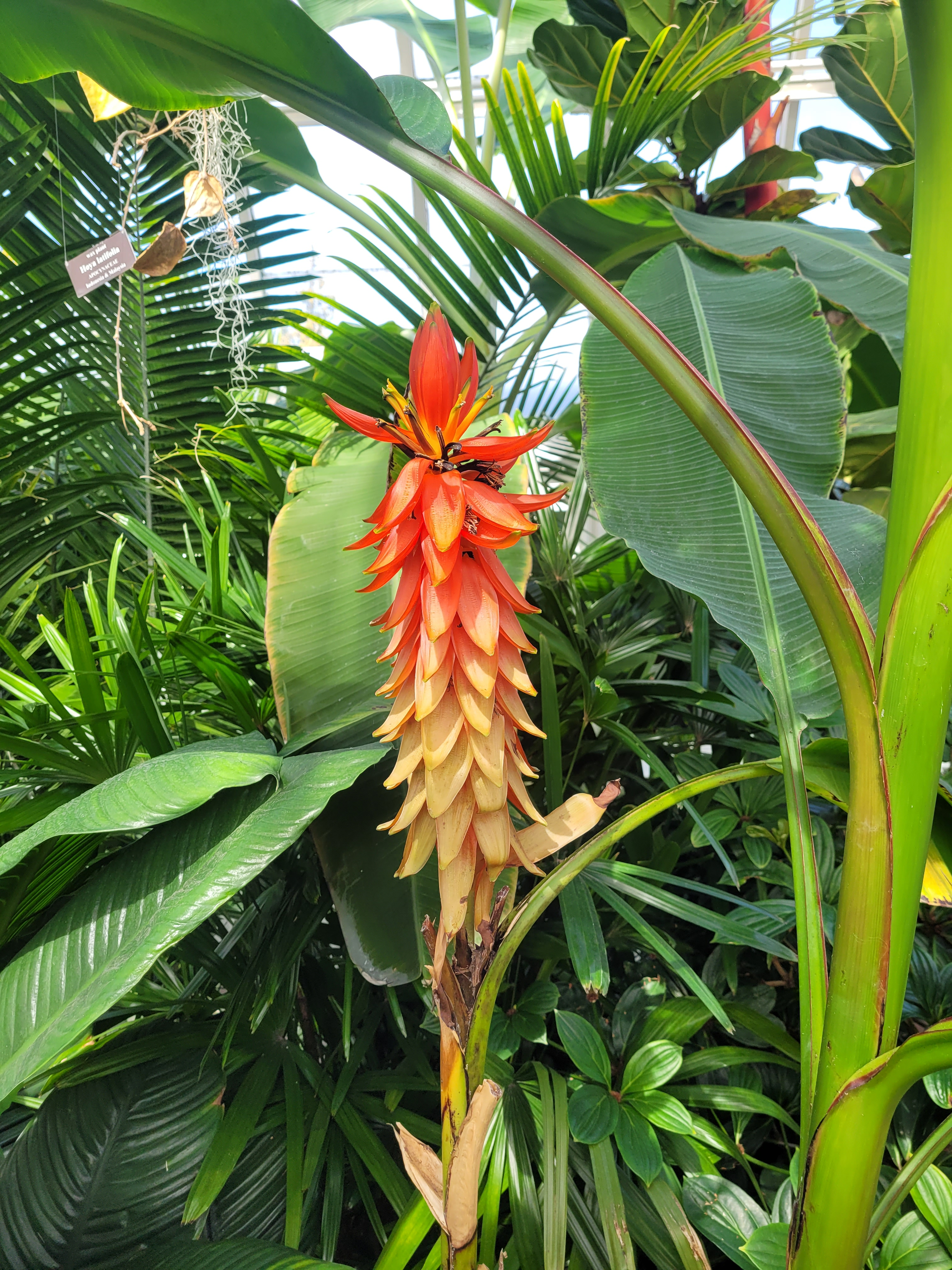
Musa haekkineii, a wild red banana native to Vietnam named for Häkkinen. Its native status is unknown due to deforestation; it is only known for sure as an ornamental plant in the 2020s.

Forty-six out of the seventy known species of wild bananas have been described by Häkkinen. The Linnean Society of London awarded him the H. H. Bloomer Award of 2009. In 2015 Häkkinen received the Finnish Cultural Foundation's Award for outstanding cultural achievement.

Häkkinen became interested in botany on his travels around the world during his career as a fully certificated sea captain. After retiring, he dedicated himself to botany. He made 18 expeditions to Borneo, Brunei, China, India, Indonesia, Malaysia, Thailand and Vietnam. He published over 80 papers in international scientific journals.

The following Musa species was named in honor of him: Musa haekkinenii, Musa velutina subsp. markkuana. and Musa markkui.
