= Betty Molesworth Allen =

New Zealand botanist

Betty Molesworth Allen OBE
- Born: Betty Eleanor Gosset Molesworth; 21 July 1913; Ōpōtiki, New Zealand
- Died: 11 October 2002 (aged 89); Marbella, Spain
- Spouse: Geoffrey Allen (m. 1948; died 1985)
- Scientific career
- Author abbrev. (botany): B.M.Allen

Betty Eleanor Gosset Molesworth Allen OBE (née Molesworth, 21 July 1913 – 11 October 2002) was a New Zealand botanist. She researched and published extensively on Southeast Asian ferns, and in her retirement she discovered a fern in southern Spain that had previously been thought to be an exclusively tropical species.

== Early life ==
Molesworth Allen was born on 21 July 1913 in Ōpōtiki, a small town in the North Island of New Zealand. Her father, Arthur Ernest Parnell Molesworth, a farmer, was the Paris-born younger son of a Cornwall rector, the 8th Viscount Molesworth. Her mother, born Nellie Maud Banks, was a friend of the suffragist Pankhurst family.

Molesworth Allen suffered tuberculosis, polio and cancer as a child and spent most of her childhood in hospitals and unable to attend schools. However, both her parents were passionate about nature and wildlife, particularly birds, and as a result she grew up with a love of flora and fauna.

== Career ==
Molesworth Allen became interested in botany through Lucy Cranwell, a botanist at the Auckland Museum. Cranwell introduced her to systematic biology and encouraged her interest in natural history. She was also influenced by John Holloway who inspired her interest in ferns. In 1939, Molesworth Allen was involved in the establishment of the Auckland Botanical Society and was its inaugural secretary. During World War II Molesworth Allen volunteered for the Women's Auxiallary Air Force, before replacing Cranwell as botanist at Auckland Museum from 1944 to 1947. In these years she made important additions to the museum's collections, including mosses and sedges and the field notebooks of T.F. Cheeseman.

In 1947 Molesworth Allen received a scholarship to study in Basel, Switzerland. Stopping over in Malaya, she met and married F. H. Geoffrey Allen, a manager at Henry Waugh & Co. Ltd.; declining the scholarship in Switzerland, she instead settled in Malaya where she trained in tropical botany and worked in the Singapore Botanic Gardens. From 1948 she travelled extensively in Southeast Asia, particularly to Malaysia, Borneo and Thailand, observing plants and collecting samples from the jungles. However, her work became dangerous during the 1948–1960 State of Emergency as Communist guerillas set up camps in the jungles.

In 1963 Molesworth Allen retired to Los Barrios in Andalusia, Spain, where she continued to collect and study plants, particularly ferns. In January 1965 she discovered the fern Psilotum nudum (L.) P. Beauv. growing in Algeciras in southern Spain, which had previously been assumed to be a solely tropical species. As a result of her discovery, the area was extensively studied and eventually protected as a national park, Los Alcornocales Natural Park.

=== Publications ===
==== Books ====
- Some Common Trees of Malaya (1957) Eastern Universities Press
- Malayan Fruits: An Introduction to the Cultivated Species (1967) D. Moore Press
- A Selection of Wildflowers of Southern Spain (1993) Santana Books

==== Articles ====
- Some conservation problems of Malaya's hill stations in Nature Conservation in Western Malaysia (1961) Malayan Nature Society
- Limestone hills near Ipoh in Nature Conservation in Western Malaysia (1961) Malayan Nature Society
- Ferns of the Quartz Ridges in The Malayan Nature Journal Vol. 17 No. 1, April 1963
- Jelatang and Pulutus: stinging trees of Malaysia in The Malayan Nature Journal Vol. 18 No. 1, April 1964
- Descriptions of the Malayan species of Laportea in Singapore Botanic Gardens Garden Bulletin Vol. 20 (4), 1964
- Psilotum Nudum in Europe in The British Fern Gazette Vol. 9 Part 6, 1965
- Malayan Fern Notes V in Singapore Botanic Gardens Garden Bulletin Vol. 22 (1&2), 1967
- Notes on some Malayan ferns (Adiantum) in The Malayan Nature Journal Vol. 22 Part 2, March 1969
- Notes on two species of Arisarum in south-west Spain in Kew Bulletin Vol. 26 No. 1, 1971
- Observations on Spanish ferns in The British Fern Gazette Vol. 10 Part 4, 1971

=== Honours and recognition ===
In 1988, Molesworth was made an adopted daughter of the town of Los Barrios, and a botanical park in the town was named in her honour – the Betty Molesworth Memorial Park. In 1995 she was awarded the H.H. Bloomer Award by the Linnean Society of London for her discovery of Psilotum nudum in Europe. In the 1997 Queen's Birthday Honours she was appointed an Officer of the Order of the British Empire for services to botany.

The hybrid plants Narcissus x alleniae and Centaurea molesworthiae were named after Molesworth Allen. A part of the Gua Tempurung, the largest limestone cave in Peninsular Malaysia, is named the Molesworth Allen Tunnel after her.

== Personal life ==
In 1948 Molesworth Allen married Geoffrey Allen, a pilot, wildlife photographer and amateur ornithologist. They were married until his death in 1985.

Molesworth Allen died in Marbella, Spain, on 11 October 2002.
