= Donovan Reginald Rosevear =

British forester and mammalogist

- Born: 28 November 1900; Chelsea, London
- Died: 17 January 1986 (aged 85)
- Occupations: Forester, mammalogist
- Awards: 1978 H. H. Bloomer Award, 1971 Stamford Raffles Award

Academic background
- Education: Christ's College, University of Cambridge

Academic work
- Discipline: Zoology, mammalogy
- Main interests: mammals, rodents, bats

Donovan Reginald Rosevear (born 28 November 1900 in Chelsea and died 17 January 1986) was a British forester and mammalogist.

== Biography ==
After completing his education at Bedford, Rosevear graduated in 1923 with a Bachelor of Arts degree and a Diploma in Forestry from Christ's College, University of Cambridge. In 1924 he moved to Nigeria, where he joined the Colonial Forest Service. For the first 20 years of his career, Rosevear worked in the south-eastern provinces of Nigeria and the British Cameroons. In addition to his profession, Rosevear was a keen observer of nature, studying the fauna and flora of West Africa.

Rosevear was an active supporter of the Nigerian Field Society (NFS), founded in 1930 by Frank Bridges. He published numerous articles in The Nigerian Field, the journal of the Nigerian Field Society, and served as vice-president of the society from 1947 to 1976.

In 1944 Rosevear settled in Ibadan and in 1951 he became Inspector-General of Forests in Lagos. In 1954 he left active forest service and returned to Britain. In London he worked as an Honorary Associate at the Natural History Museum, where he worked for over 20 years with the support of the Wellcome Trust and the Leverhulme Trust. From 1956 to 1960 he was a member of the committee of the Fauna and Flora Preservation Society.

Rosevear assembled a large collection of small West African mammals and published a series of scientific works on mammals, including "Forest Conditions of the Gambia" (1937), "Hoofed Mammals of Nigeria" (1939), A Checklist and Atlas of Nigerian Mammals (1953), The Bats of West Africa (1965), The Rodents of West Africa (1969), and The Carnivores of West Africa (1974).

== Honors ==
In 1954, Rosevear was appointed Commander of the British Empire (CBE). In 1971, he received the Stamford Raffles Award from the Zoological Society of London. In 1978, he was awarded the H. H. Bloomer Award from the Linnean Society of London. In 1980, the Rosevear's striped grass mouse (Lemniscomys roseveari), native to Zambia, in 1997, the Rosevear's brush-furred mouse (Lophuromys roseveari), native to Cameroon, and in 2013, Rosevear's serotine (Neoromicia roseveari), native to Liberia and Guinea, were named in Donovan Rosevear's honour.
