= Parastrophia asturiana =

Scientific classification
- Kingdom: Animalia
- Phylum: Mollusca
- Class: Gastropoda
- Subclass: Caenogastropoda
- Order: Littorinimorpha
- Family: Caecidae
- Genus: Parastrophia
- Species: P. asturiana

Binomial name
- Parastrophia asturiana de Folin, 1870

Species of gastropod

Parastrophia asturiana is a species of small sea snail, a marine gastropod mollusc or micromollusc in the family Caecidae.
