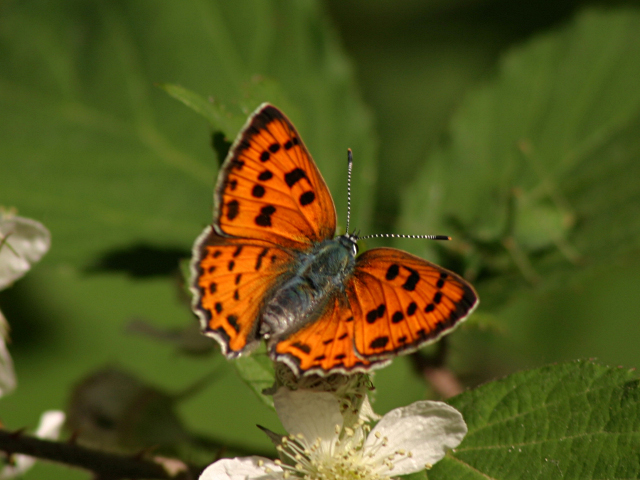

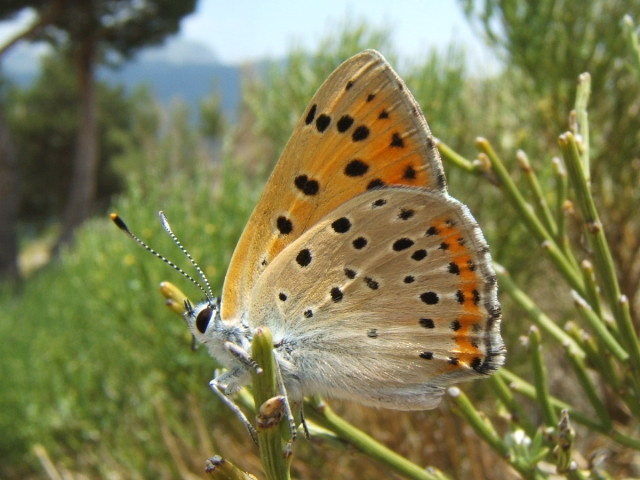

Scientific classification
- Kingdom: Animalia
- Phylum: Arthropoda
- Clade: Pancrustacea
- Class: Insecta
- Order: Lepidoptera
- Family: Lycaenidae
- Genus: Lycaena
- Species: L. alciphron

Binomial name
- Lycaena alciphron (Rottemburg, 1775)

= Purple-shot copper =

Species of butterfly

The purple-shot copper (Lycaena alciphron) is a butterfly in the family of the Lycaenidae or copper butterflies and in the genus of the Lycaena.

The coloring of the males and the females is very different, i.e. the sexual dimorphism is very strong. The top sides of the wings are red-gold with black spots. The males fluoresce purple, while the females' top side is brown, also with black spots. The rear wings have submarginal spots.

The caterpillar is nocturnal and eats sorrel. The fully-grown butterfly feeds from wild thyme, ground-elder, and blackberry flowers.

The purple-shot copper can be found in Europe, Morocco, and Turkey at heights between 500 and 900 meters.

This butterfly migrates from June to July.

== Subspecies ==
There are several subspecies including:

- Lycaena alciphron melibaeus (Staudinger, 1878)
- Lycaena alciphron gordius (Sulzer, 1776)
- Lycaena alciphron heracleana (Blachier, 1908)
- Lycaena alciphron granadensis (Ribbe, 1905)

== Description from Seitz ==
C. alciphron Rott. (= lampetie Schiff., virgaureae Hufn., hiere F., helle Bkh., hipponoe Esp.) (77 a), Lighter yellow and less golden [than hippothoe]; the upperside of the male in the name-typical form quite unlike that of any other Chrysophanus, being so dusted with dark scales which have a bluish gloss that the ground-colour is almost suppressed. This dark scaling of the male is only interrupted by the black discal spots and a reddish yellow distal band of the hindwing. The underside is rather uniform in colour, on the disc of the forewing somewhat brighter reddish yellow, with numerous, rather large, round ocelli strongly edged with whitish. In Central Europe and the southern districts of North Europe, from the shores of the North Sea and the Baltic provinces to the chain of the Alps, and from North France to the Altai and Mongolia. — In the South the species is represented by the much larger gordius Sulz. (77 a), of which both sexes are bright yellow-red above, with very prominent and heavy black spots above and yellow instead of blue-grey underside to the hindwing. — There exist nearly all intergradations between gordius and the typical form, for instance meliboeus Stgr. (77 a), in whose males, which are larger than alciphron, but smaller than most gordius, the yellowish red ground-colour breaks through the dark scaling, though it is less pure than in true gordius: in Greece, Asia Minor and North Persia; Greek specimens differ a little from those from Anterior Asia, but the differences are not sufficient to justify a separate name. — granadensis Ribbe (77 b) has at the most the size of alciphron, being often even smaller, but the spots of the upperside are larger than even in gordius, with which it agrees in the bright yellowish red colour of the upperside; in Spain. — Among gordius there occur also aberrant specimens which are transitions to the name-typical form. Steffanelli described them as ab. intermedia from Boscolungo in Italy; the hindwing of the female is dark except for a yellowish red submarginal band. Also the black spots may vary in a similar way, as is the case in the preceding species of Chrysophanus: In ab. subfasciata Schultz (77 b), of which the type has been kindly lent to me for figuring, all the spots of the upperside are so large that those of the submarginal row are united to a band which is hardly interrupted by the veins. In ab. mutilata Schultz the ocelli situated in the cells on the underside are strongly developed, while the distal ones are nearly all absent. An aberration of gordius with the ocelli of the underside similarly reduced has received the name ab. evanescens Gillm. In ab. viduata Schultz, an aberration of alciphron, the ocelli of the underside are so weakly represented above that the upperside appears almost without spots, ab. infulvata Schultz is the name for females which are quite uniformly black-brown above, being even devoid of the reddish yellow submarginal band on the hindwing and corresponding to ab. nigra of hippothoe. The phenomenon often observed in hippothoe that the ocelli are modified into streaks is according to Schultz considerably rarer in alciphron; Schultz names such specimens ab. constricta. — Egg, as most Chrysophanus eggs, flattened, green-yellow, with the surface reticulate. Larva from August to early May, green, almost unicolorous, along the back and also on each side a whitish green longitudinal stripe shaded with dark; the head, which is only visible when feeding, black-brown; on Rumex. Pupa fastened near the ground by means of very thin threads, olive-green, with darker shadowy stripes. The butterflies are on the wing in June and July; they are less confined to definite restricted flight-places than the preceding species [hippothoe], but occur much more singly and like drier localities. They are busy visiting flowers, especially those of brambles at sunny waysides; gordius is especially fond of clusters of thyme and Sedum album according to Courvoisier, and ascends in the Alps up to 10 000 ft.

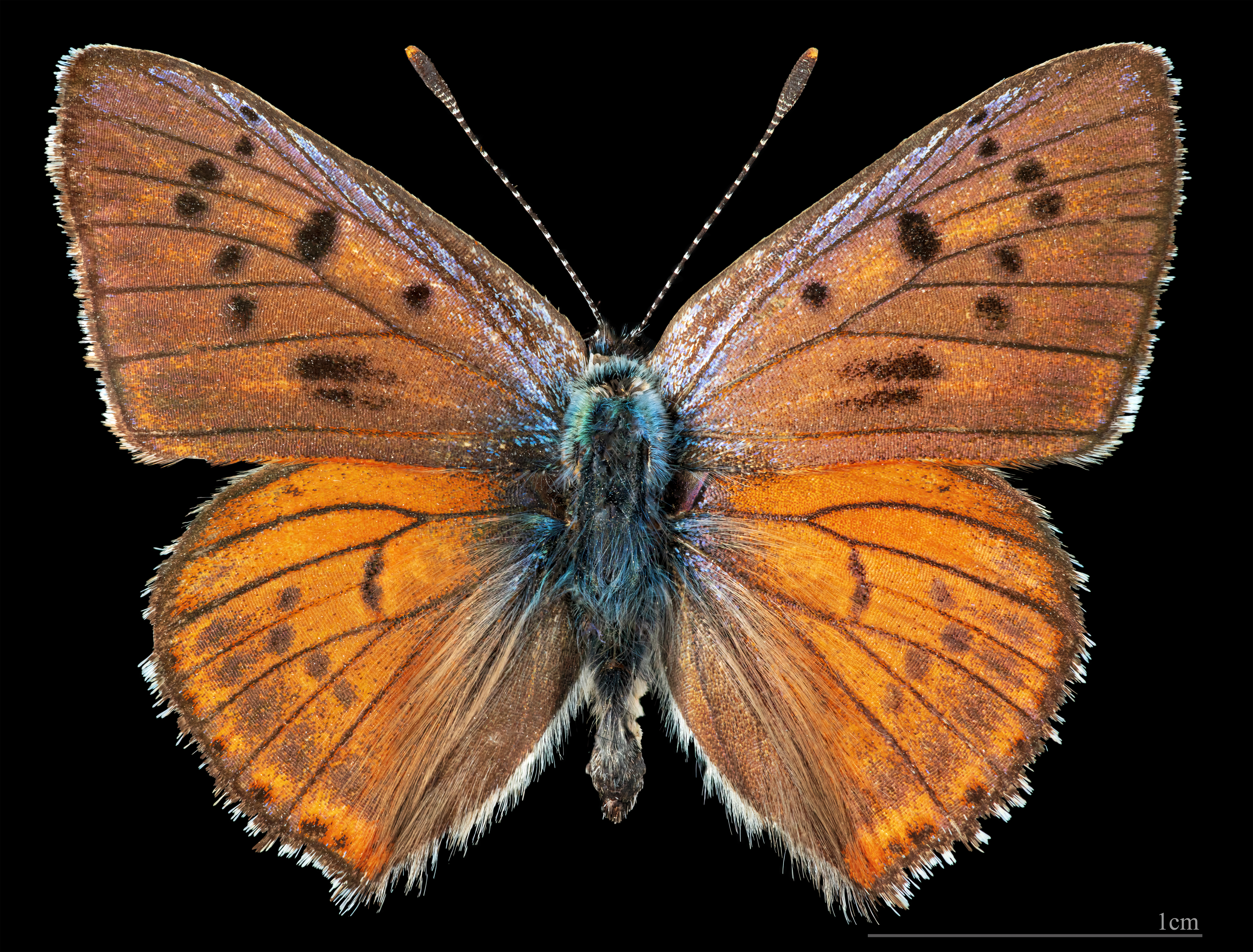
Lycaena alciphron ♂

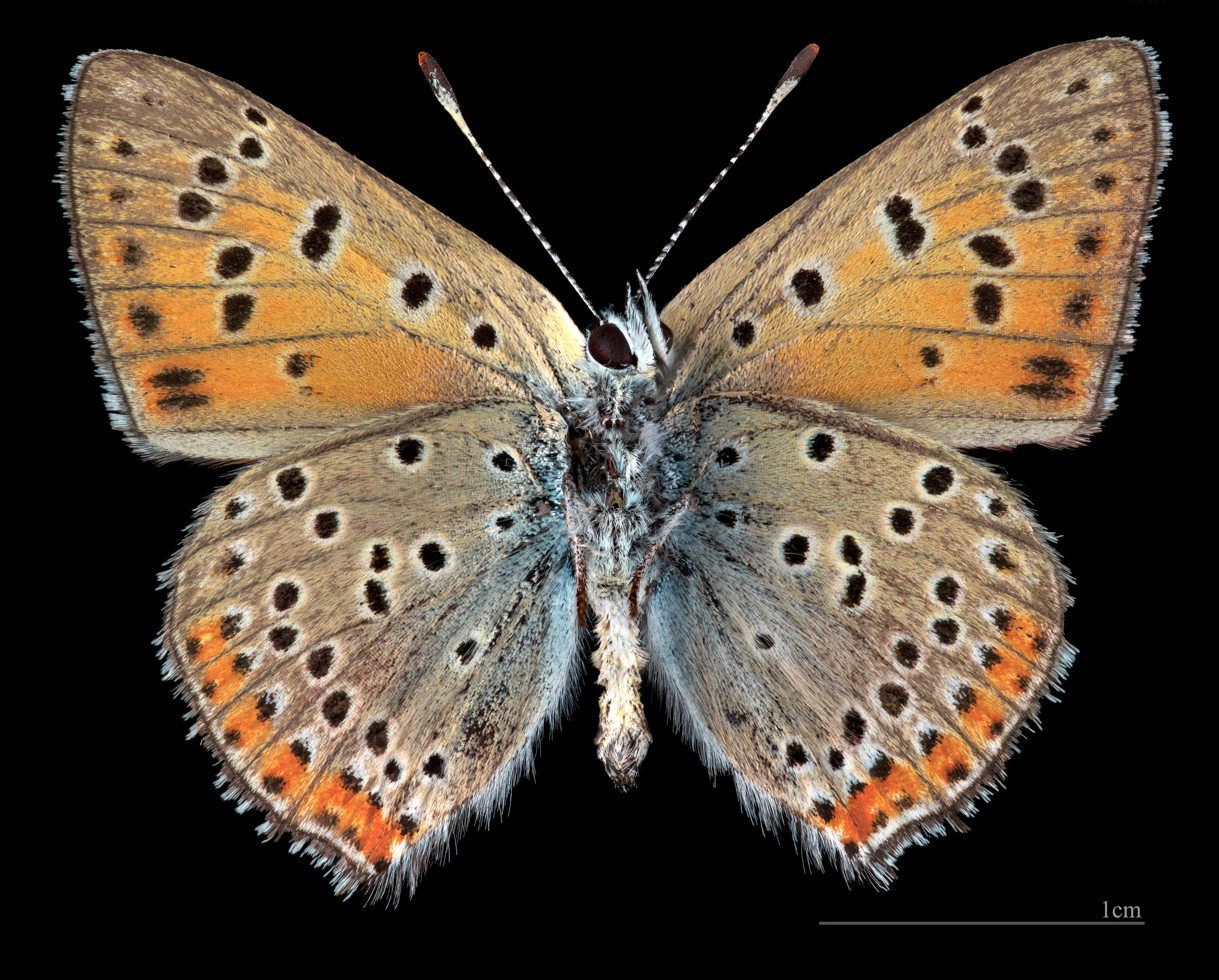
Lycaena alciphron ♂ △
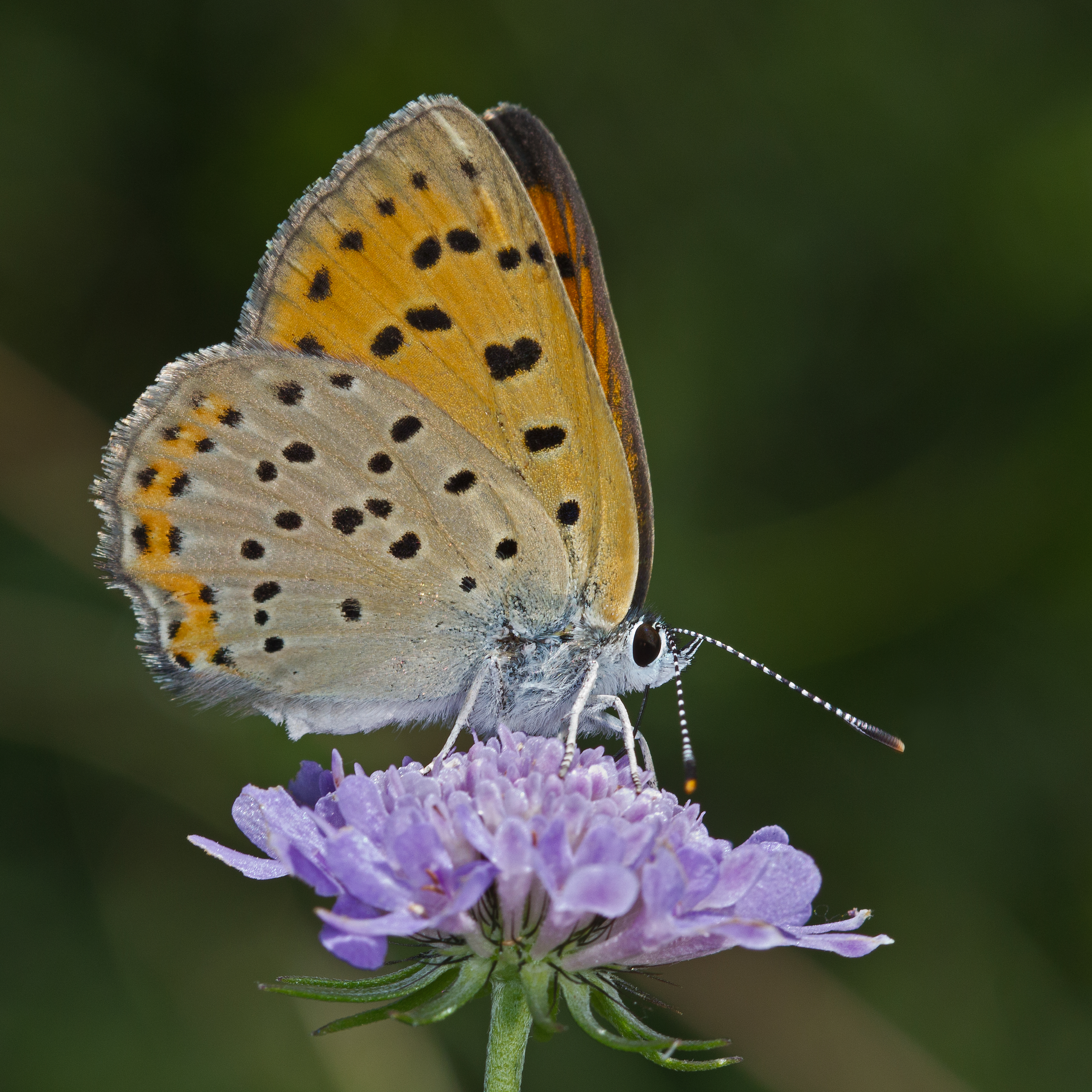

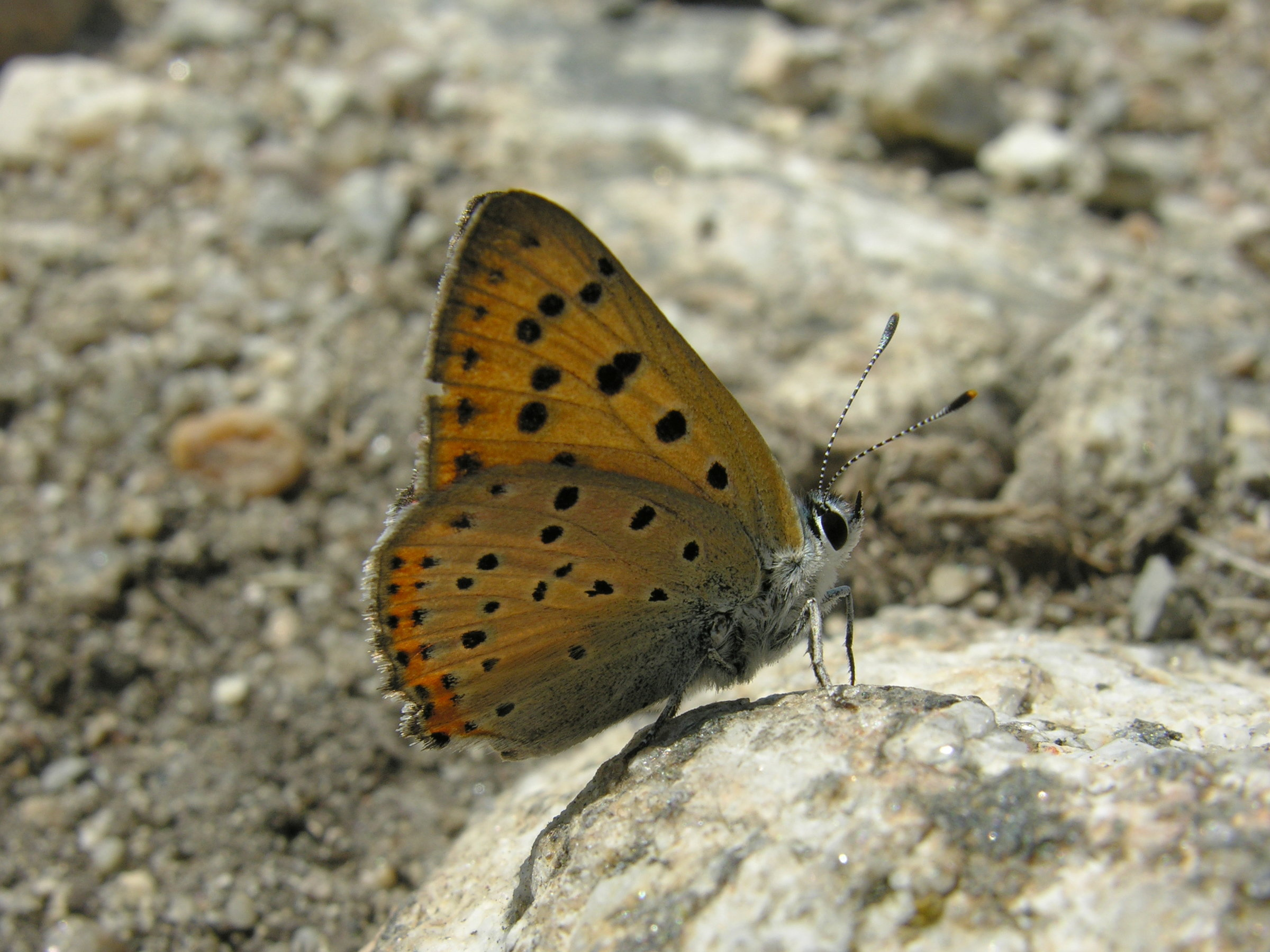

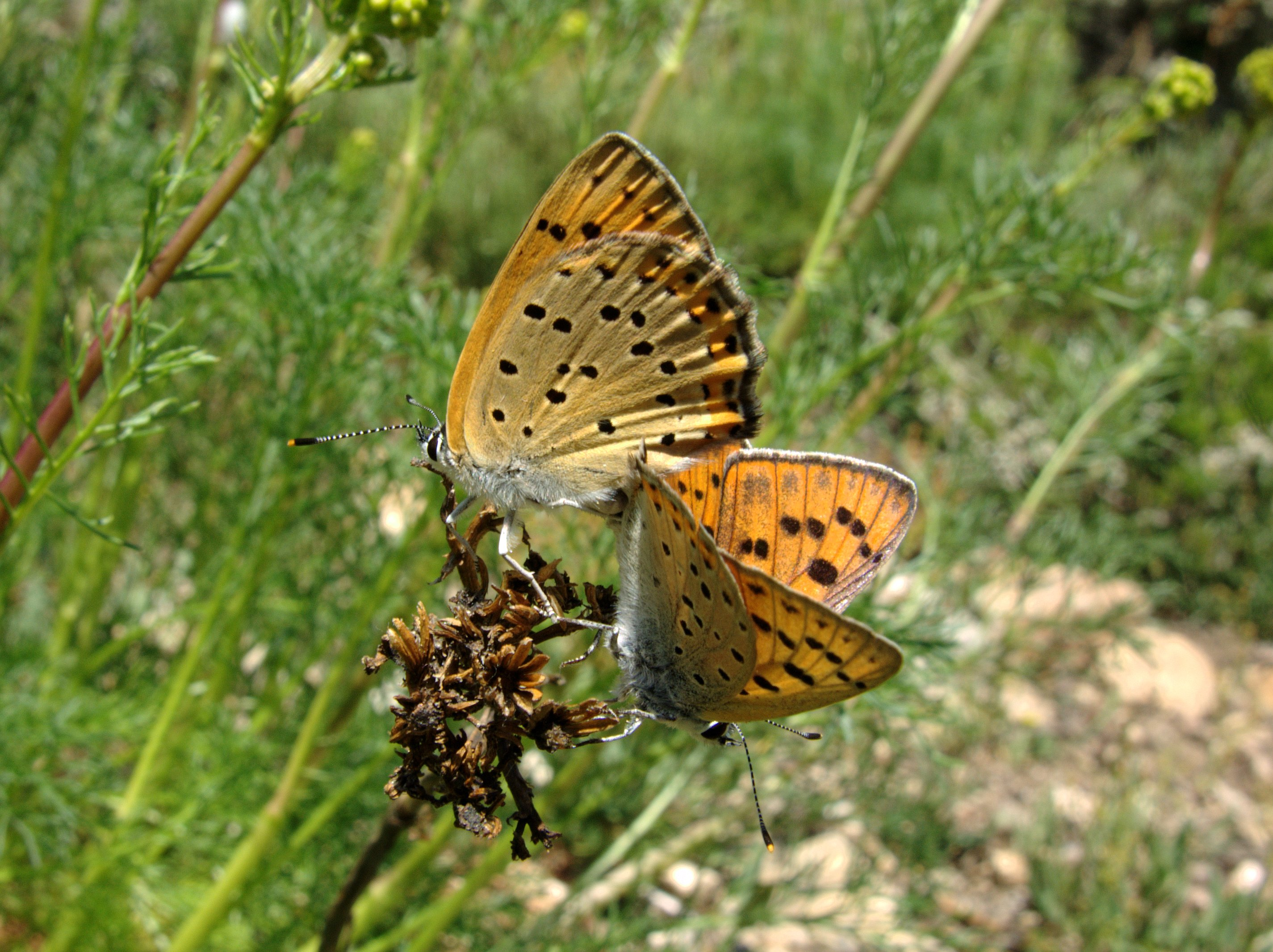
Mating

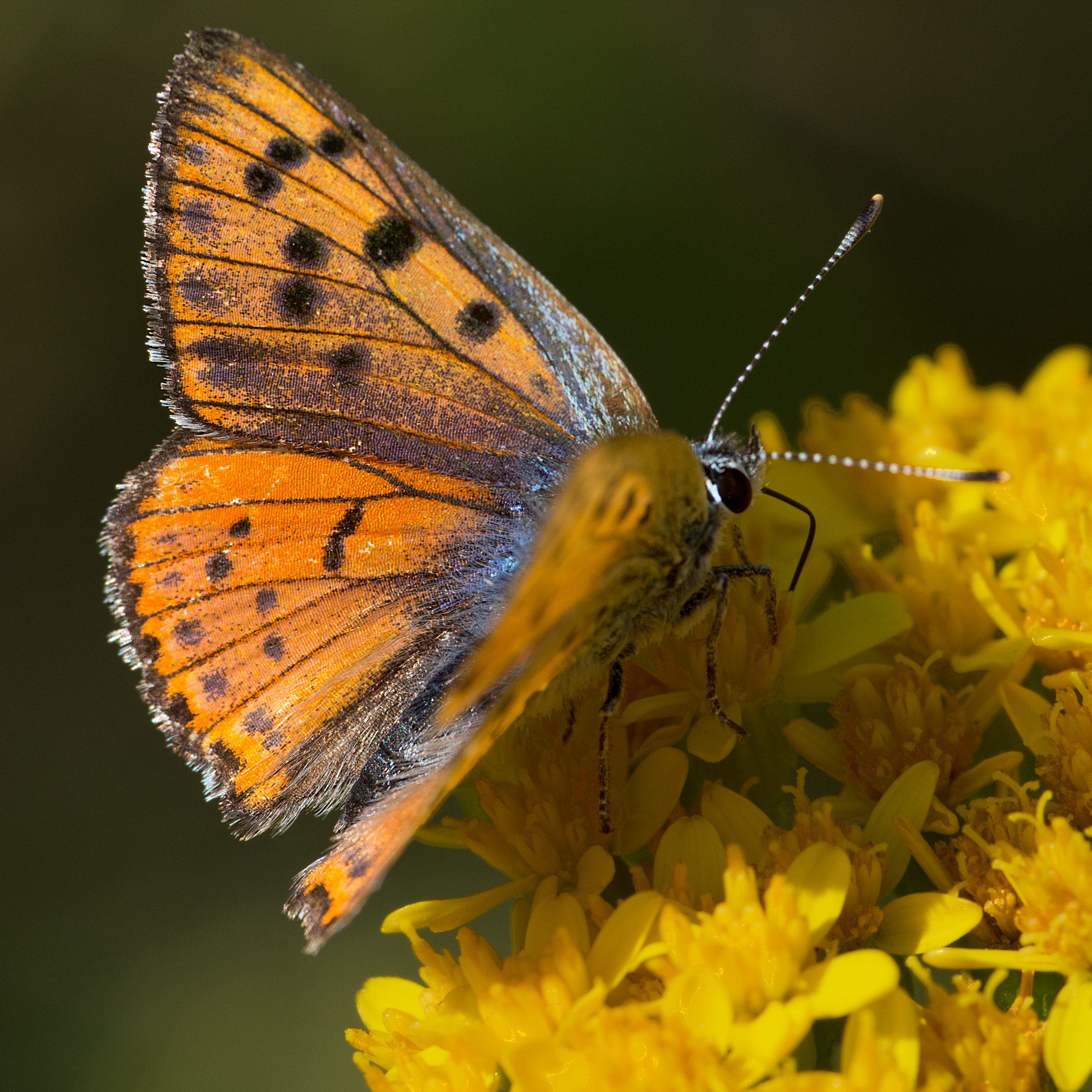
Showing its purple 'shot'
