= Blanche Henrey =

English botanical writer and bibliographer

Blanche Elizabeth Edith Henrey (1906–1983) was an English botanical writer and bibliographer, described in her Times obituary as "one of the most eminent among botanical bibliographers". She was born in Brentford on 7 February 1906 and died on 9 March 1983.

== Works ==
- Flower Portraits, 1937
- Trees and Shrubs Throughout the Year, 1944
- British Botanical and Horticultural Literature before 1800, 3 vols, 1975
