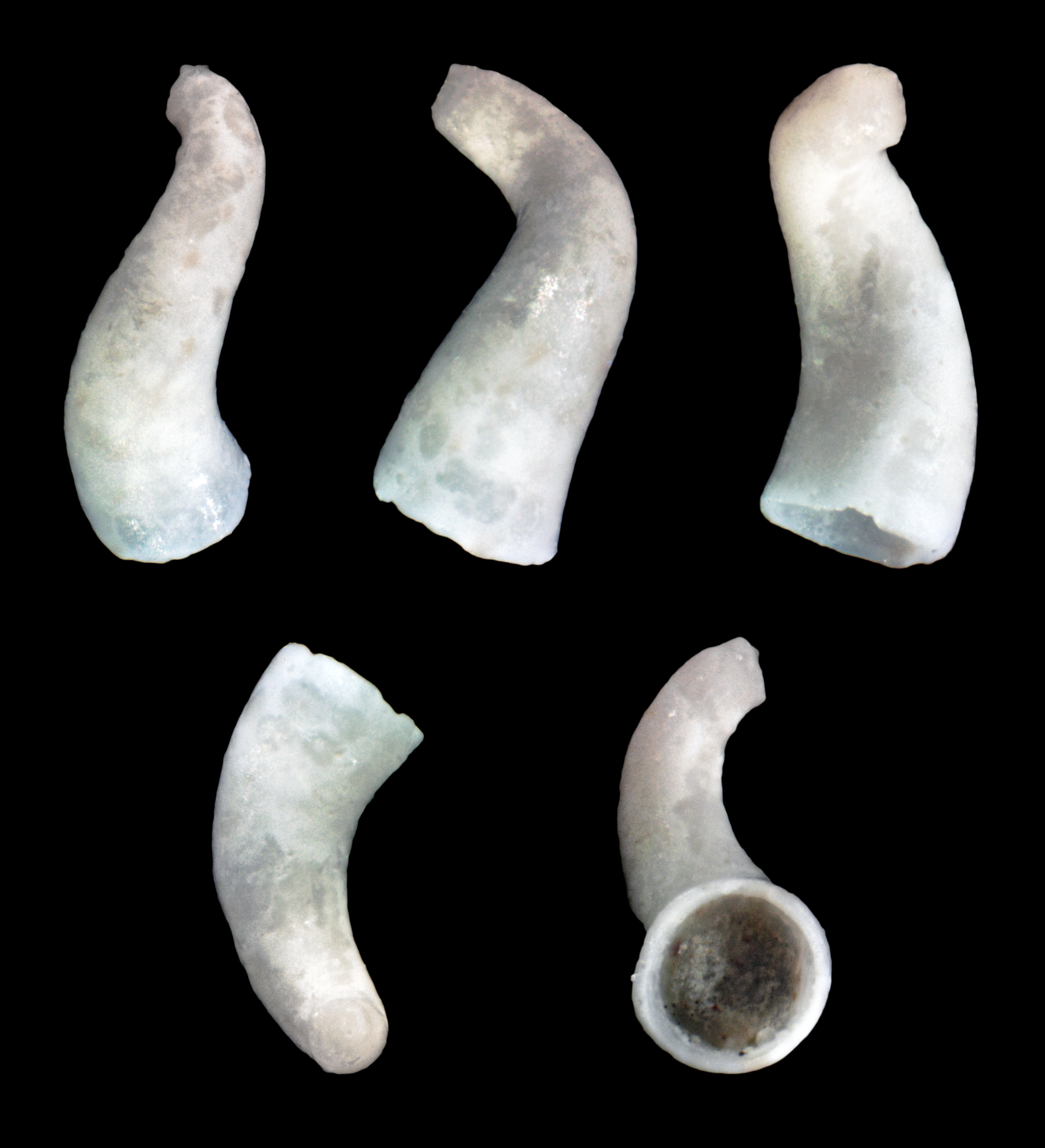
- Parastrophia cornucopiae (Carpenter, 1858)

Scientific classification
- Kingdom: Animalia
- Phylum: Mollusca
- Class: Gastropoda
- Subclass: Caenogastropoda
- Order: Littorinimorpha
- Superfamily: Truncatelloidea
- Family: Caecidae
- Genus: Parastrophia de Folin, 1869

Type species
- Moreletia cornucopiae de Folin, 1869

Synonyms
- Gladioceras Iredale & Laseron, 1957; Moreletia de Folin, 1869 (Invalid: junior homonym of Moreletia Gray, 1855; Parastrophia is a replacement name); Parastrophia (Parastrophia) de Folin, 1869· accepted, alternate representation; Parastrophia (Watsonia) de Folin, 1880· accepted, alternate representation; Pedumicra Iredale & Laseron, 1957; Pseudoparastrophia Di Staso, 1905; Spirolidium O. G. Costa, 1861 (doubtful synonym); Watsonia de Folin, 1880

= Parastrophia =

Genus of gastropods

Parastrophia is a genus of minute sea snails, marine gastropod molluscs or micromollusks in the family Caecidae.

== Species ==
Species within the genus Parastrophia include:

- Parastrophia asturiana de Folin, 1870
- Parastrophia avaricosa Vannozzi, Pizzini & Raines, 2015
- Parastrophia cecalupoi Vannozzi, 2017
- Parastrophia challengeri de Folin, 1880
- Parastrophia christinae Selli, 1974
- Parastrophia cornucopiae (de Folin, 1869)
- Parastrophia cygnicollis (Hedley, 1904)
- Parastrophia elegans (de Folin, 1880)
- Parastrophia erseusi Hughes, 1993
- Parastrophia ingens Vannozzi, 2017
- Parastrophia ivani Vannozzi, 2017
- Parastrophia japonica Hinoide & Habe, 1978
- Parastrophia megadattilida Pizzini, Raines & Vannozzi, 2013
- Parastrophia melanesiana Pizzini, Raines & Vannozzi, 2013
- Parastrophia monicae Vannozzi, 2017
- Parastrophia ornata Vannozzi, Pizzini & Raines, 2015
- Parastrophia pulcherrima Pizzini, Raines & Vannozzi, 2013
- Parastrophia queenslandica (Iredale & Laseron, 1957)
- † Parastrophia radwanskii Bałuk, 1975
- Parastrophia reticulata Vannozzi, 2017
- Parastrophia sumatrana (Thiele, 1925)
- Parastrophia vanuatuensis Pizzini, Raines & Vannozzi, 2013

Species brought into synonymy

- Parastrophia filum Melvill, 1906: synonym of Parastrophia cornucopiae (de Folin, 1869)
- Parastrophia folini Bucquoy, Dautzenberg & Dollfus, 1884: synonym of Parastrophia asturiana de Folin, 1870
- † Parastrophia garganica Montcharmont-Zei, 1954: synonym of Parastrophia asturiana de Folin, 1870
