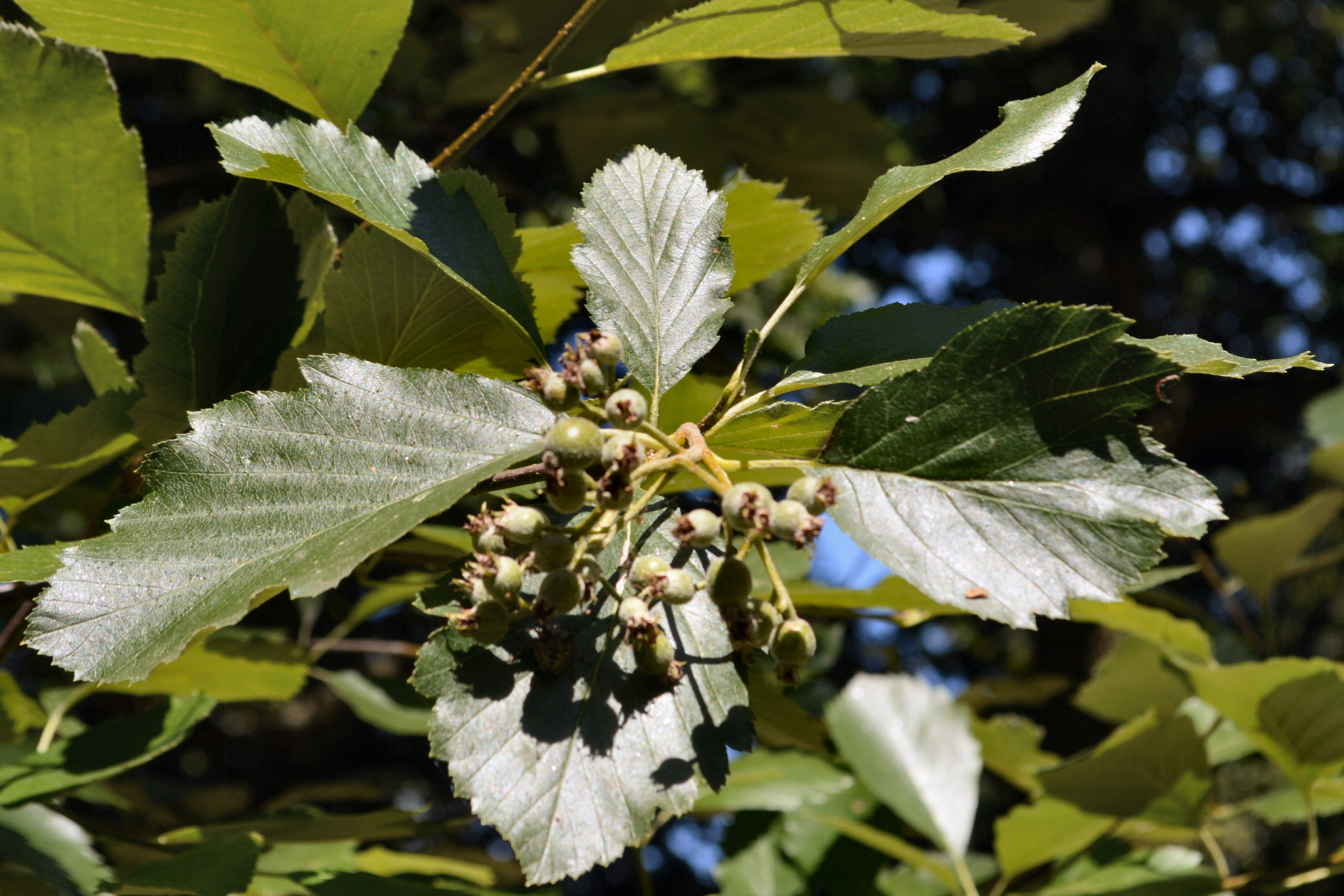
- Aria bristoliensis at Kew Gardens

Conservation status
- Endangered (IUCN 3.1)

Scientific classification
- Kingdom: Plantae
- Clade: Tracheophytes
- Clade: Angiosperms
- Clade: Eudicots
- Clade: Rosids
- Order: Rosales
- Family: Rosaceae
- Genus: Aria
- Species: A. bristoliensis

Binomial name
- Aria bristoliensis (Wilmott) Mosyakin, Fedor. & McNeill

Synonyms
- Karpatiosorbus bristoliensis (Wilmott) Sennikov & Kurtto; Pyrus bristoliensis (Wilmott) M.F.Fay & Christenh.; Sorbus bristoliensis Wilmott

= Aria bristoliensis =

Species of flowering plant

Aria bristoliensis is a species of flowering plant in the family Rosaceae. It is known commonly as the Bristol whitebeam. It is endemic to Great Britain, growing wild only in the Avon Gorge and in the Leigh Woods area of Bristol. There are around 300 individuals as of 2016, and the population is thought to be increasing.
