= New Journal of Botany =

- Discipline: Botany
- Language: English
- Edited by: Richard Gornall

Publication details
- Former name(s): Watsonia
- History: 1949–2017
- Publisher: Maney Publishing on behalf of the Botanical Society of Britain and Ireland (United Kingdom)
- Frequency: Triannual

Standard abbreviations
- ISO 4: New J. Bot.

Indexing
- ISSN: 2042-3497
- LCCN: 2011252931
- OCLC no.: 780326717

Links
- Journal homepage; Online archives; Watsonia online archives

The New Journal of Botany was a peer-reviewed scientific journal covering research on the native flora of Northern and Western Europe. It also included population and conservation biology, ecological genetics, autecological, physiological, and phenological studies, plant/animal interactions, and plant biochemistry. It was established in 1949 as Watsonia, with the subtitle Journal & Proceedings of the Botanical Society of the British Isles. It was named after the eighteenth-century British botanist Hewett Watson. The journal was renamed New Journal of Botany in 2011 with volume numbering restarting at 1. It was discontinued in 2017. The journal was published by Maney Publishing on behalf of the Botanical Society of Britain and Ireland. It was abstracted and indexed in AGRICOLA, Biological Abstracts, BIOSIS Previews, CAB Abstracts, and Scopus.
