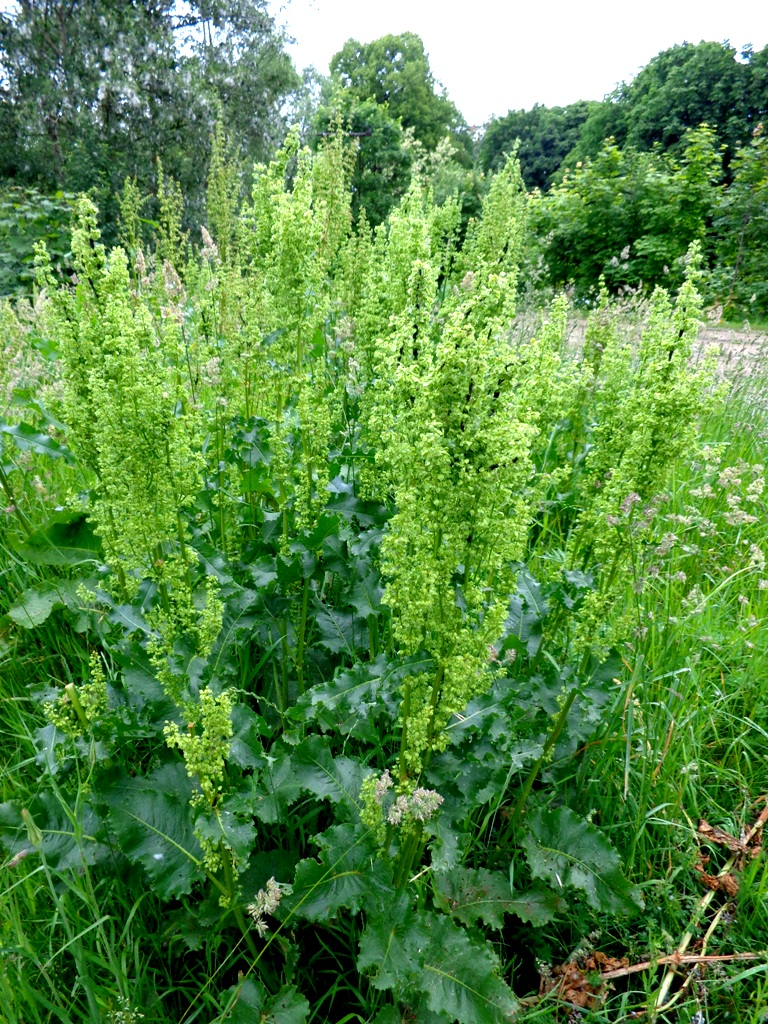

Scientific classification
- Kingdom: Plantae
- Clade: Embryophytes
- Clade: Tracheophytes
- Clade: Spermatophytes
- Clade: Angiosperms
- Clade: Eudicots
- Order: Caryophyllales
- Family: Polygonaceae
- Genus: Rumex
- Species: R. confertus

Binomial name
- Rumex confertus Willd.

= Rumex confertus =

Species of flowering plant

Rumex confertus (Armenian dock) is a flowering plant species in the family Polygonaceae. It grows quickly, reproduces from rhizomes and seed, and produces large quantities of viable seed. Its seed is adapted for wind and water dispersal and exhibits a high rate of germination.

== Distribution ==
Rumex confertus flowering usually occurs late spring-summer. Along roadsides, waste places, meadows, river valleys. This species is common in central and Eastern Europe, can be expected elsewhere in mild climate regions of North America.

== Uses ==
The Rumex L. (dock) species have been used in medical treatment for many centuries.
