= Central Asian Flyway =

Major flyway for migrating birds in Eurasia

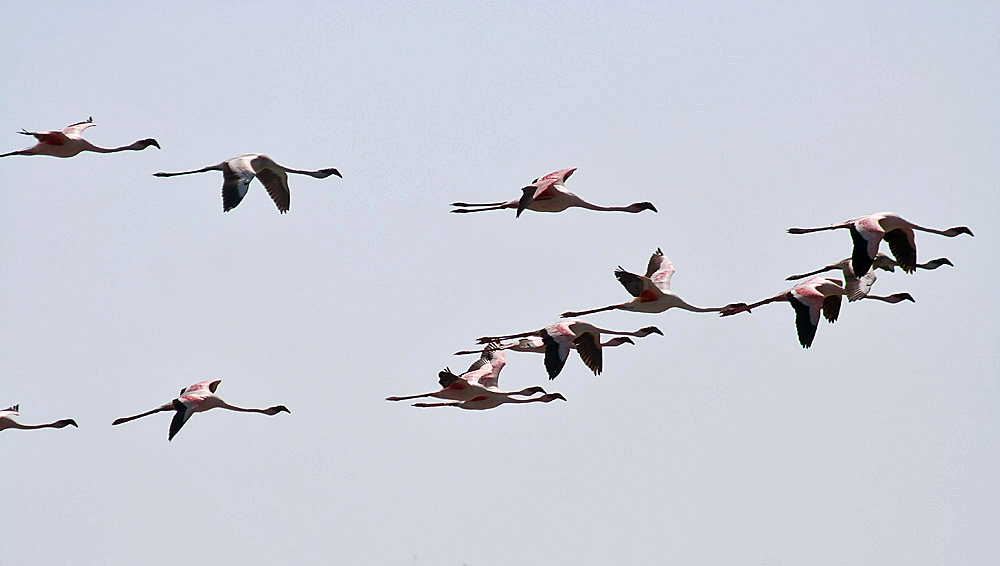
Lesser flamingos In flight at Chilika Lake

The Central Asian Flyway (CAF), Central Asian-Indian Flyway, or Central Asian-South Asian Flyway is a flyway covering a large continental area of Eurasia between the Arctic Ocean, the Indian Ocean and the associated island chains. The CAF comprises several important migration routes of waterbirds, most of which extend from the northernmost breeding grounds in Siberia to the southernmost non-breeding wintering grounds in West Asia, India, the Maldives and the British Indian Ocean Territory.

== Range ==
A flyway is an operational concept linked to waterfowl whose population one wishes to manage over their entire migration space.

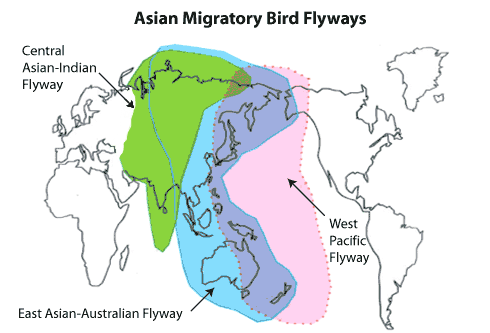
Central Asian, East Asian-Australasian, and West Pacific migratory bird flyways

The CAF range is centered on one of the three major wintering areas of waterfowl in the Old World, the Indian subcontinent. The two other significant areas are in Africa, in territory of the African-Eurasian Flyway (AEWA) to the west, and south-east Asia in the East Asian – Australasian Flyway (EAAF) to the east. These wintering areas are geographically separate, and present entirely different ecological, historical and cultural situations.

The flyway covers 30 countries of North, Central and South Asia and Trans-Caucasus. The northern catchment area of the CAF overlaps with both the AEWA and EAAF, mostly within a single country, the Russian Federation, though 16 of the 30 countries encompassed by the CAF (Afghanistan, Armenia, Azerbaijan, Bahrain, China, Georgia, Iran Republic of, Kazakhstan, Mongolia, Pakistan, Russian Federation, Saudi Arabia, Sri Lanka, Tajikistan, Turkmenistan, United Arab Emirates, United Kingdom, Chagos Islands and Uzbekistan) are located in the AEWA area.

The remaining countries in the Central Asian Flyway are Bangladesh, Bhutan, India, Iraq, Kuwait, Kyrgyzstan, Maldives, Myanmar, Nepal, Oman, Qatar and Yemen.

== Species ==
The Central Asian Flyway covers at least 279 migratory waterbird populations of 182 species, including 29 globally threatened species and near-threatened species that breed, migrate and spend the non-breeding winter period within the region. Some species are completely or largely restricted to the Central Asian Flyway range, such as:

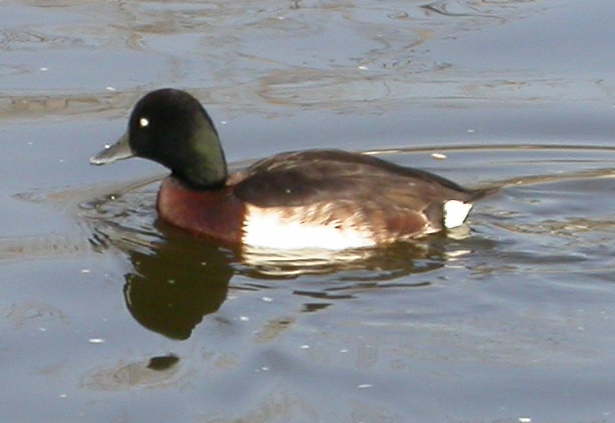
Baer's pochard

- critically endangered - northern bald ibis, white-bellied heron, and Baer's pochard
- endangered - Indian skimmer
- vulnerable - Black-necked crane, masked finfoot, Socotra cormorant, and wood snipe
- near threatened - Lesser adjutant, greater adjutant, lesser flamingo, pygmy cormorant, and white-eyed gull

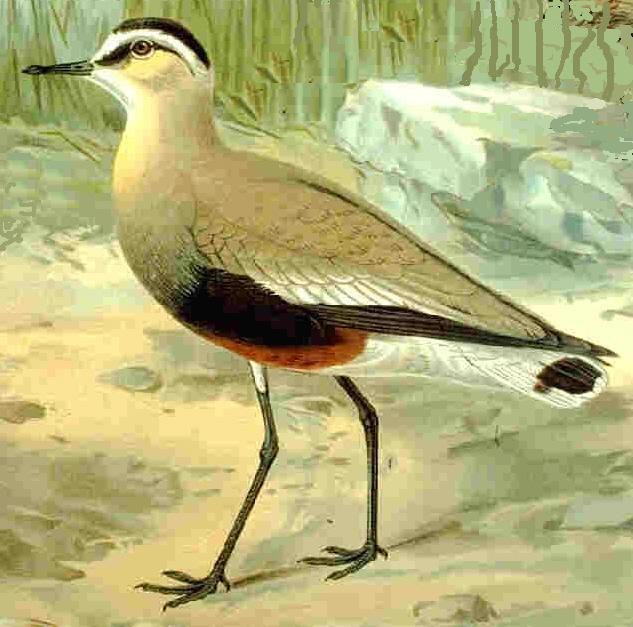
Sociable lapwing

In addition, the breeding range of some species are largely restricted to the region although the non-breeding ranges overlap with adjoining flyways. Examples include:

- critically endangered - Siberian crane, slender-billed curlew, sociable lapwing, and spoon-billed sandpiper
- endangered - red-breasted goose, Nordmann's greenshank, and white-headed duck
- vulnerable - spot-billed pelican, Dalmatian pelican, lesser white-fronted goose, marbled duck, and relict gull
- near-threatened - black-winged pratincole, ferruginous duck, corn crake, and Asian dowitcher

== Conservation ==
Ramsar logo

Regional cooperation among the Central Asian Flyway states is undertaken to promote the conservation of migratory waterbirds and their habitats. This includes various international conventions including Central Asian Waterbirds Flyway Action Plan, Convention on the Conservation of Migratory Species (CMS), Agreement on the Conservation of African-Eurasian Migratory Waterbirds (AEWA), Convention on Wetlands of International Importance (Ramsar) and Convention on Biological Diversity (CBD) and development agencies including United Nations Environment Programme (UNEP), United Nations Development Programme (UNDP), World Bank and Asian Development Bank (ADB) and international Non-governmental organizations including BirdLife International, World Conservation Union (IUCN), World Wide Fund for Nature (WWF) and Wetlands International who all cooperate on regional and national wildlife conservation.

Regional plans complement actions that are being undertaken by national governments to promote conservation. Several countries have well established protected areas to conserve important habitats for migratory waterbirds.

Bangladesh

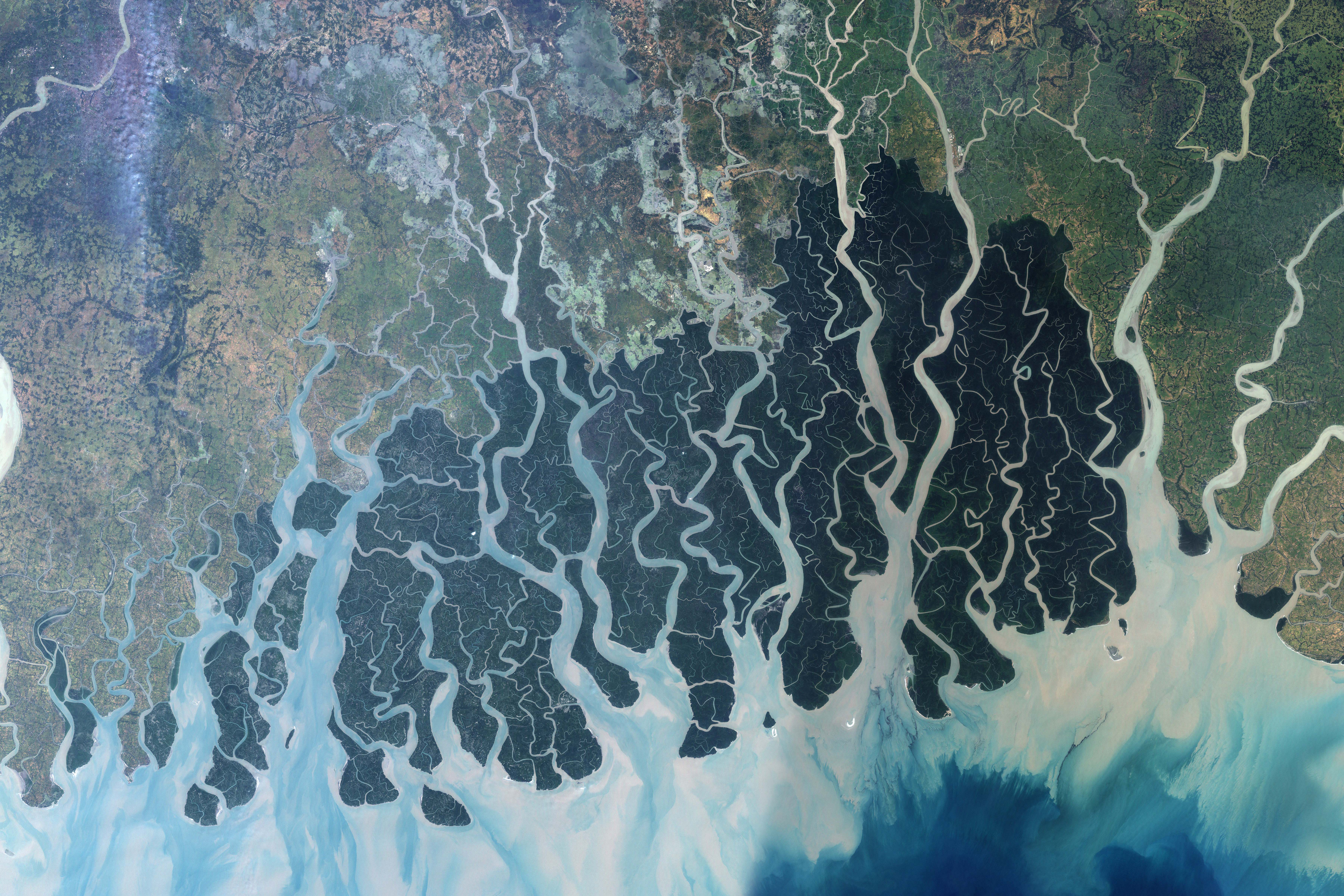
Satellite image of the Sundarbans

According to the Ramsar definition, more than two-thirds of the country's landmass may be classified as wetlands. It is a country dominated by wetland including estuaries, mangrove swamps namely the Sundarbans, freshwater marshes such as haor, swamps and rivers. There are about 628 bird species in Bangladesh, of which 244 are migratory. About 100 species of migratory birds regularly or occasionally visit the country. Considering the present threats to waterbird conservation in the country, 31 migratory waterbird species are of high priority for future action for conservation. 14 of these species are threatened.

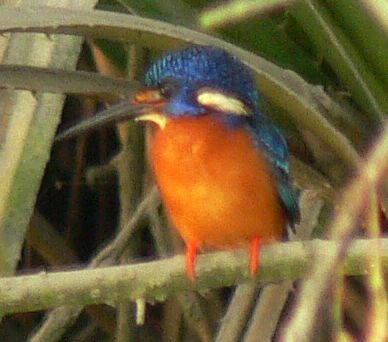
Less concern blue-eared kingfisher in the Sundarbans.

The wetlands are home to about 70 species of resident waterbirds including ducks, grebe, cormorants, bitterns, herons, egrets, storks, rails, jacanas, finfoot, waders, gulls, turns, and skimmers. Eleven species of resident waterbirds are identified as threatened. The important threatened species are masked finfoot, Indian skimmer, black-headed ibis, greater adjutant, lesser adjutant, Baikal teal, Baer's pochard, ferruginous pochard, wood snipe, Nordmann's greenshank, and spoon-billed sandpiper.

The wetlands of Bangladesh are being degraded rapidly due to population pressure, withdrawal of water for irrigation, destruction of swamp forest, and many other anthropogenic and natural causes. Large scale habitat conversion, unsustainable harvesting policies and lack of ecological considerations have led to the destruction of valuable wetland habitat for water birds and other associated biodiversity. Immediate action is required for restoring these habitats and conserving the water birds in Bangladesh.

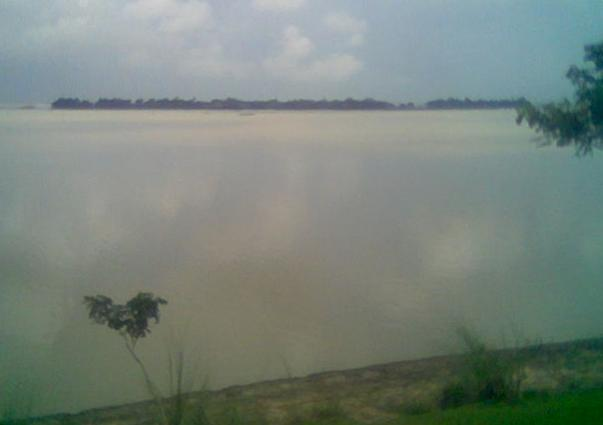
Chalan Beel in Natore District

The key breeding and staging areas of Bangladesh include Haor areas such as the Meghna estuary, Tanguar haor and Hail-Hakaluki haors, Chalan Beel, the Sundarbans and other coastal mangroves including Hatia and Nijhum Dweep, and haor areas of the north west and off shore islands.

The Sundarbans mangrove forest of Bangladesh are included within 139,699 ha (539 sq mi) of 3 Wildlife sanctuaries which are part of the Sundarbans World Heritage Site. The Ministry of Environment and Forests (MoEF) through its Department of Environment and Forest Department 'Wildlife Management and Nature Conservation Circle' is the main institutional structure for wildlife conservation including waterbirds and their habitats. The Ministry of Land is the legal authority for land management including wetlands.

Bangladesh is signatory to CBD, CMS, CITES and Ramsar Convention. No national level initiative has been taken for waterbirds. But self-funded waterbird census is undertaken each year in selected habitats.

India

India is the core country of the CAF and supports 257 species of water birds. Of these, 81 species are migratory birds of CAF conservation concern, including three critically endangered species, six endangered species, and 13 near threatened species. The Ministry of Environment and Forests is the nodal agency for developing strategy and action plans and managing national, regional, and international programmes on water birds and wetlands conservation. Implementation of action plans is through the states environment and forests agencies with complementing activities provided by many academic institutions, NGO-conservation organizations, professional institutions and international agencies. National government institutions involved in migratory waterbirds and wetlands research/management include the Zoological Survey of India, the Sálim Ali Centre for Ornithology and Natural History, the Wildlife Institute of India, Indian Institute of Forest Management, the Centre for Environment Education, the Indian Institute of Economic Growth, the Indira Gandhi Institute of Development Research, and the Indian Council of Agricultural Research.India has identified more than 300 potential Ramsar sites, of which 25 have been implemented. India is notable among CAF countries, with an extensive series of important bird areas and protected areas including bird sanctuaries, wildlife sanctuaries and national parks in wetlands that provide convenient stopover and wintering areas for migratory birds using the Central Asian Flyway.

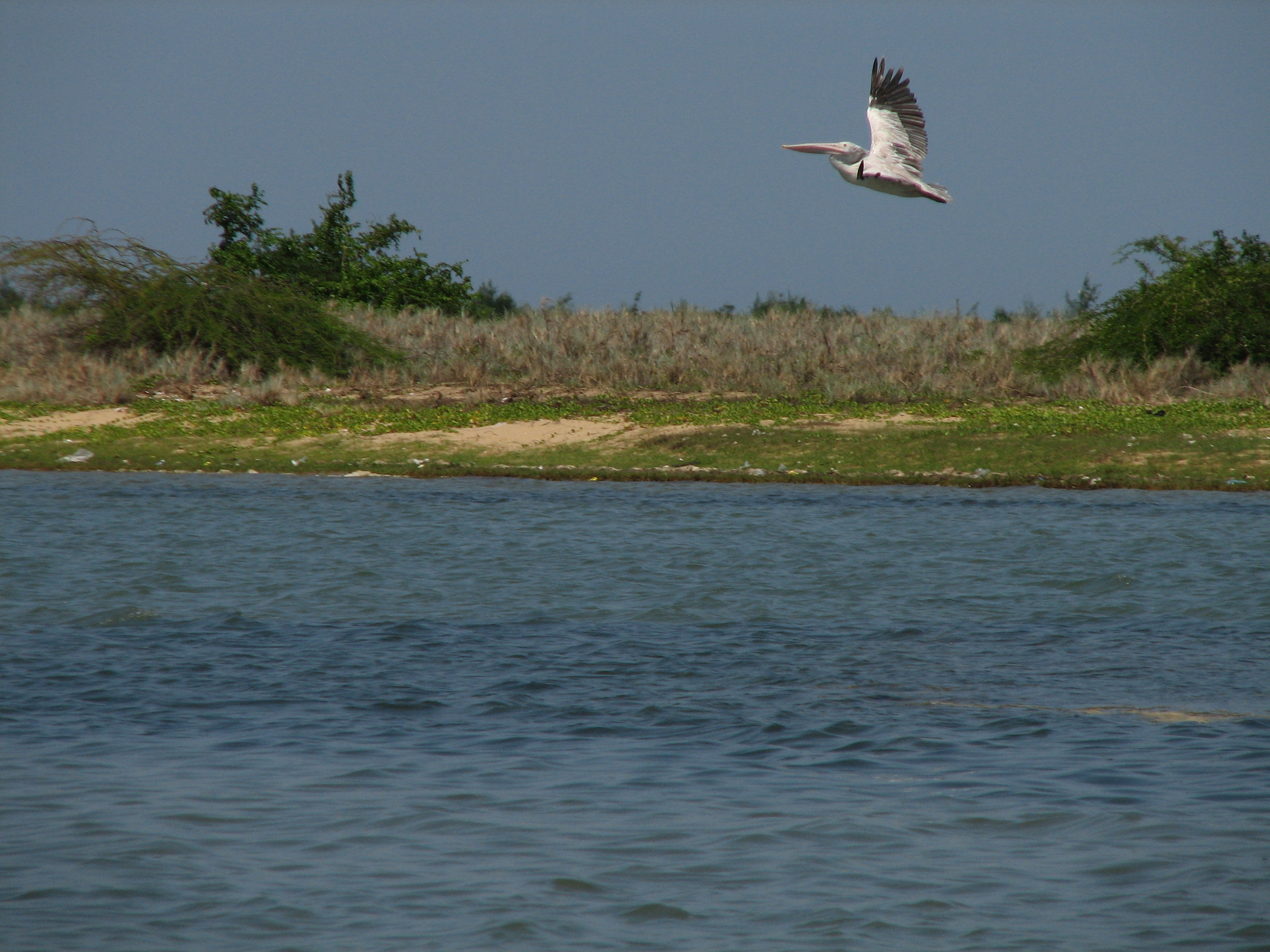
Spot-billed pelican at Pulicat Lake

Listed from north to south along the Eastern Flyway on or near the east coast, these include the Bhitarkanika Wildlife Sanctuary and National Park, Chandka-Dampara Wildlife Sanctuary, Mangal Jodi Nalabana Bird Sanctuary, Coringa Wildlife Sanctuary and Godavari estuary, Kolleru Lake Wildlife Sanctuary, Nellapattu Bird Sanctuary, Pulicat Lake Bird Sanctuary, Guindy National Park, Kaliveli Tank and Yeduyanthittu estuary, Bahour Lake, Point Calimere Wildlife and Bird Sanctuary, Karaivetti Wildlife Sanctuary, Big Tank (Peria Kanmai) and Sakkarakotai Kanma, Chitrangudi Bird Sanctuary and Kanjirankulam Bird Sanctuary, Gulf of Mannar Marine National Park and Kunthangulam Bird Sanctuary

Sanctuaries for migratory waterbirds listed from north to south along the Western Flyway on or near the west coast of India include Rann of Kutch, Flamingo City, Banni Grassland and Chhari Dhand, Naliya Grassland, Lala Bustard Wildlife Sanctuary, Porbandar Bird Sanctuary, Khijadiya Lake and Bird Sanctuary, Marine National Park and Wildlife Sanctuary, Charakla Salt Works, Nal Sarovar Bird Sanctuary, Blackbuck National Park, Velavadar, Gir National Park and Wildlife Sanctuary, Kaj Lake Pipalava Bandharo, Bhimashankar Wildlife Sanctuary, Mahul - Sewree Creek, Sanjay Gandhi National Park, Koyna Wildlife Sanctuary, Burnt Island (Bandra) Vengurla Rocks, Carambolim Wetlands, Bhagwan Mahavir Wildlife Sanctuary, Cotigao Wildlife Sanctuary, Anshi National Park, Gudavi Bird Sanctuary, Kudremukh National Park, Bhadra Wildlife Sanctuary, Bramhagiri Wildlife Sanctuary, Aralam Wildlife Sanctuary, Kattampally, Nilgiri Biosphere Reserve including: Mukurthi National Park, Mudumalai National Park, Wynad Wildlife Sanctuary, Bandipur National Park and Silent Valley National Park, Indira Gandhi Wildlife Sanctuary and National Park, Periyar National Park, Thrissur-Ponnani Kole Wetlands, Neyyar Wildlife Sanctuary and Suchindram Theroor Birds Sanctuary, the southernmost protected area in the continental range of the Central Asian Flyway

Pakistan

Pakistan has had very few studies to monitor the migratory bird populations and their use of wetlands. Current flyway management systems rely on information from local hunters, erratic wildlife surveys and raw estimates.

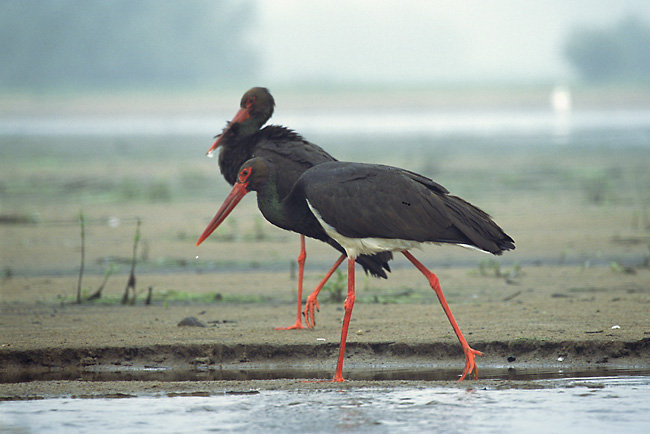
Black storks

Key wetland sites include Mangla Lake, Rawal Lake in Margalla Hills National Park, Zangi Nawar Lake, the high mountain wetlands in northern Pakistan including the Naltar wetland complex and the wetlands of Deosai National Park plains. There have been several reports of black storks, cranes and flocks of vulnerable marbled teal.

The World Wide Fund for Nature reported that Pakistan's wetlands and their rich biological resources are threatened by over-exploitation, habitat destruction and polluted environments. The main causes for wetland degradation are ineffective management, poor stakeholder participation and lack of coordination for management strategies.

Russia

About half the territory of the Russian Federation is in the range of the Central-Asian Flyway. Among the 176 CAF species, 143 (85%) are located (and mostly breed) in Russian territory. Most of the species are presented by Anatidae and wader groups. 37 species that inhabit the CAF area are included in the Russian Red Data Book and more than 40 species are hunting objects.

Sri Lanka

Sri Lanka is the southernmost landmass of the Central Asian Flyway and is the final destination of many migratory birds exiting the eastern and western Indian flyways and the Andaman Islands. The Department of Wildlife Conservation in Sri Lanka has declared four Ramsar sites and declared other protected areas in Sri Lanka which are wetlands habitats of migratory waterbirds. These include the Anawilundawa Sanctuary, Bellanwilla - Attidiya Sanctuary, Bundala National Park, Gal Oya National Park, Giants' Tank Sanctuary, Kumana National Park, Muthurajawela wetlands and Yala National Park.

== Additional sources ==
- CMS Secretariat Launches Action Plan For Central Flyway
- Wetlands Biodiversity and Waterbirds: the Central Asian Flyway initiative, including Map of the Central Asian Flyway
- Flyway conservation in the Central Asian Flyway
