= Yellow River Delta National Nature Reserve =

Protected area in Dongying, China

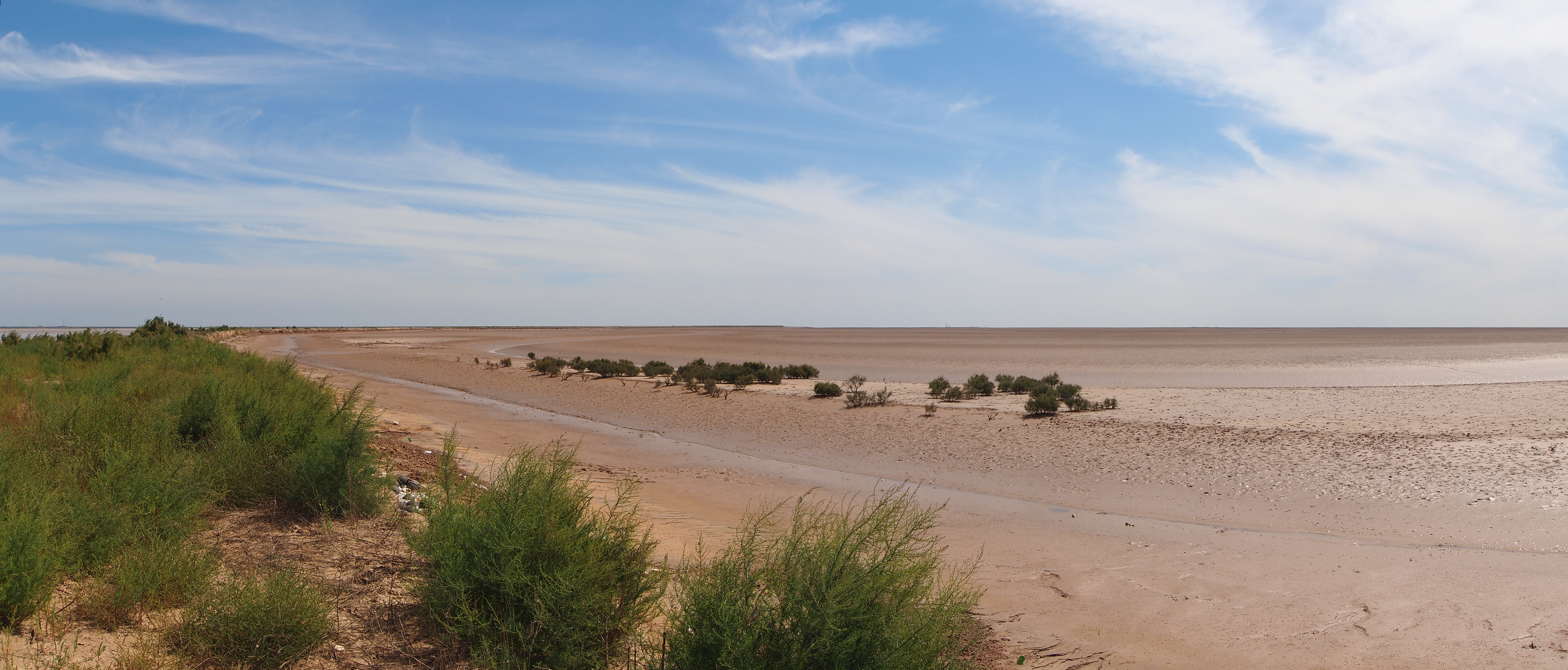
- Mudflat near the mouth of Yellow River

- Location within China
- Location: Dongying, Shandong, China
- Coordinates: 37°54′N 118°57′E
- Area: 154,000 hectares (380,000 acres)
- Established: 1992
- Governing body: Shandong Yellow River Delta National Nature Reserve Administrative Bureau

Ramsar Wetland
- Official name: Shandong Yellow River Delta Wetland
- Designated: 16 October 2013
- Reference no.: 2187

Yellow River Delta National Nature Reserve
- Simplified Chinese: 黄河三角洲国家级自然保护区
- Traditional Chinese: 黃河三角洲國家級自然保護區
Transcriptions
Standard Mandarin
- Hanyu Pinyin: huáng hé sān jiǎo zhōu guó jiā jí zì rán bǎo hù qū

The Yellow River Delta National Nature Reserve (YRDNNR) is a protected area in the city of Dongying, China, which covers wetland habitats on the shore of the Bohai Sea. These wetlands are formed through the deposition of silt by the Yellow River, forming a large and growing delta. The reserve is split geographically into two portions, one covering the current mouth of the Yellow River and one covering wetlands that remain near a former river mouth. In management terms, it is divided into a core area with a high level of protection, and buffer and experimental zones which allow for greater human activity.

The current river delta area only became widely settled in the 20th century. The discovery of the Shengli Oil Field brought significant economic activity to the area, and the city of Dongying was founded in 1983. The wetland ecosystem was degraded by the impact of economic activity within what became Dongying, as well as by inland agriculture which reduced water levels in the Yellow River. To preserve the wetland habitats, a process began to establish the YRDNNR, and the reserve was fully designated in 1992. The reserve now serves as a location for research and tourism, with one attraction being the "carpet" of red Suaeda salsa plants in autumn. There are plans to expand the reserve and convert it into a national park.

The wetland habitats within Dongying are crucial for bird species, supporting breeding populations as well as birds migrating along the East Asian–Australasian Flyway and the West Pacific Flyway. It is an especially important location for the protected Oriental stork, hosting the species' largest breeding population. Other species for which these wetlands form a crucial habitat include Saunders's gull and the Siberian crane.

Due to geographic and hydrological factors, unlike the Pearl River Delta and Yangtze River Delta, the Yellow River Delta is the only delta of a major river in China which is not the heart of an immense megalopolis.

== Background ==
The delta shifting from 1989 to 2009

The route of the Yellow River has shifted throughout history. The river shifted to its current course depositing silt into the Bohai Sea in 1855, having previously flowed into the ocean further south. The precise location of the mouth of the river shifted 50 times since then, reaching its current position in 1976.

Human settlement of the current delta began in 1898, with heavy cultivation and population growth beginning in 1934. Local governments used the area for forestry and farming, resulting in some damage to the wetland ecosystem and an eventual loss of farmland due to land reclamation increasing soil salinity. The northern Diaokou River became separated from the main Yellow River in 1976. The city of Dongying was created on 1 October 1983, incorporating several existing local jurisdictions.

In December 1990 the Yellow River Delta Municipal Nature Reserve was created, becoming the Dongying Yellow River Delta Provincial Nature Reserve in November 1991 and then the Shandong Yellow River Delta National Nature Reserve in October 1992 upon approval by the State Council. The Shandong Yellow River Delta National Nature Reserve Administrative Bureau was then set up in December 1992. The borders that were created sought to minimize overlap with facilities used to exploit the Shengli Oil Field, a crucial driver of the local economy and one of China's most important oil fields.

Today Dongying has 4,567.73 square kilometres (1,763.61 sq mi) of wetlands, about 41.58% of the area within the city's jurisdiction. The wetland areas extend beyond the protected reserve, and include both urban and rural inhabited and industrial spaces.

== Geography ==
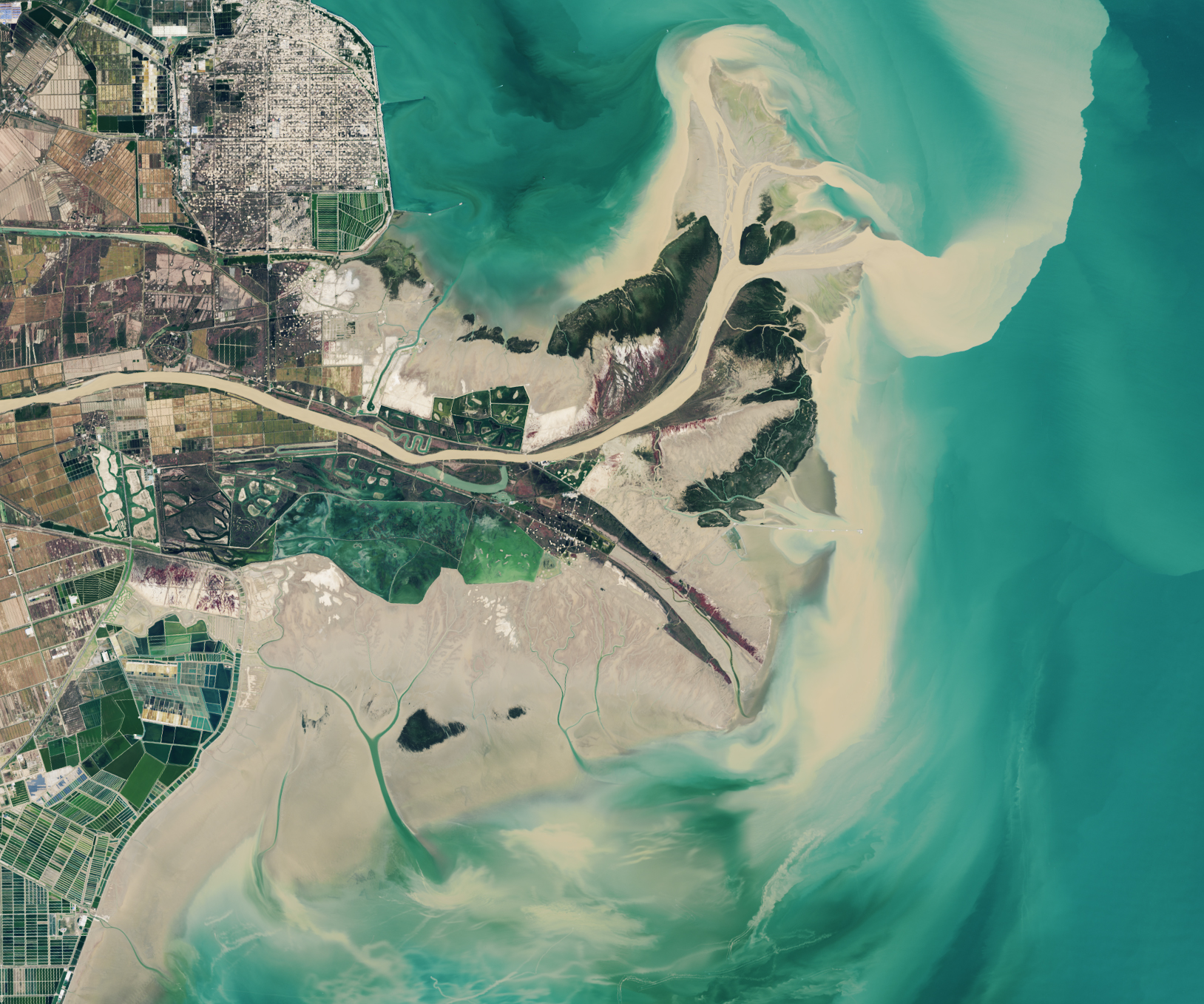
The Yellow River delta on 24 October 2020

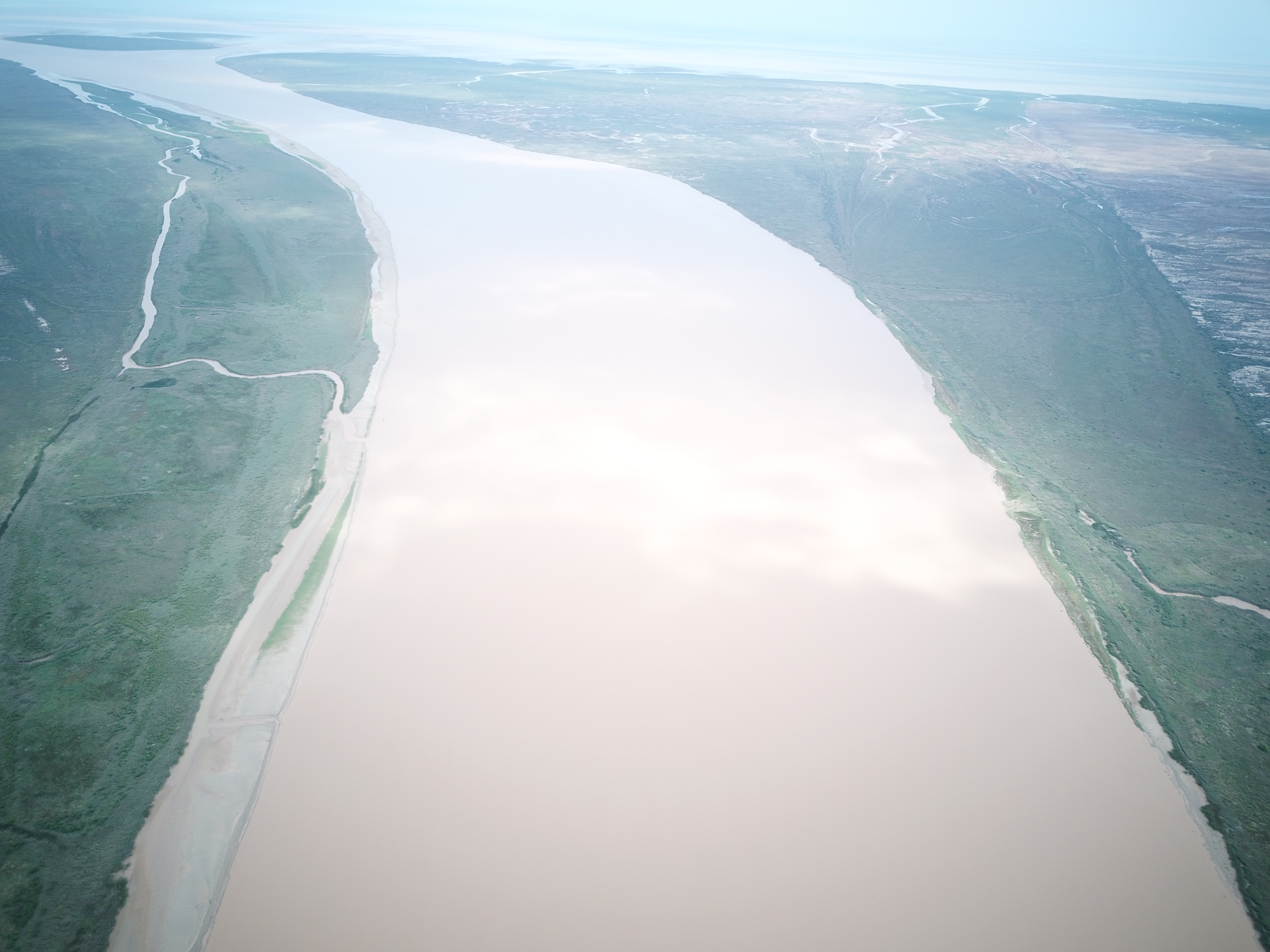
Aerial view of Yellow river near its mouth

The YRDNNR lies within the northeast of the administrative boundaries of the city of Dongying, where the city meets Laizhou Bay and the wider Bohai Sea, between 118°33'-119°20'E and 37°35'-38°12'N. It covers 131 kilometres (81 mi) of coastline, which has a tidal range that varies from 0.46 metres (1.5 ft) to 1.78 metres (5.8 ft). This area is the end-point of the Yellow River, and the park's 153,000 hectares (380,000 acres) includes the river mouth, although it does not cover the entire delta. There are two unconnected areas making up the park, one at the current river mouth on the city's eastern coast and a smaller area on the city's northern coast. The portion to the north is located at the mouth of the Diaokou River, an older course of the Yellow River. The monsoon continental climate is warm and temperate with four seasons averaging 11.9 °C (53.4 °F) and an average annual relative humidity of 68%. Most rain occurs in summer, with an average annual precipitation of around 592 millimetres (23.3 in) and an average annual evaporation of 1,962 millimetres (77.2 in). The delta does not receive snow. There are 210 frost-free days each year.

The park is divided into three management areas: a 79,200-hectare (196,000-acre) core area with strict environmental protection, a 10,600-hectare (26,000-acre) buffer zone where some already present human activities continue, such as agriculture, fishing, and other activities carried out by local communities, and a 63,200-hectare (156,000-acre) experimental zone. The reserve completely encompasses three state-owned farms and forestry areas, created before the reserve, which make up 41.8% of the total area, in addition to partially encompassing other state-owned bodies. The division between the protected core area and other portions of the park partially reflects economic needs, especially regarding the oil field.

The coastal wetland area within the reserve includes 32,772 hectares (80,980 acres) of reed marshes, 38,534 hectares (95,220 acres) of intertidal mudflats, and 31,314 hectares (77,380 acres) of marine waters. Inland, the reserve covers 7,966 hectares (19,680 acres) of wetlands, including man-made wetlands, rivers, and other permanent water bodies.

The flow of the Yellow River varies greatly throughout the year, and between years. While average annual discharge from 1950 to 1985 was around 41.9 billion cubic metres (1.48×10^{12} cu ft), this fluctuated from 79.31 billion cubic metres (2.801×10^{12} cu ft) to 9.15 billion cubic metres (323×10^{9} cu ft). Average annual flow rate is around 1,330 cubic metres per second (47,000 cu ft/s). From March to June water levels are low, sometimes to the point of parts of the river drying up. Heavy rainfall inland leads to flooding from July to October, after which the river continues a high flow rate reaching up to 10,400 cubic metres per second (370,000 cu ft/s). Water levels remain high from December to March due to sea ice floes impeding discharge.

The water in the river has a pH of 8.0-8.3, a total hardness of 2.16-5.56, and a mineral intensity of 0.2–0.6 grams per litre (7.2×10^{−6}–2.17×10^{−5} lb/cu in). Underground water is also salty with high levels of mineral intensity. The river carries 1.049 billion tons of silt to the ocean each year, the highest stream load in the world averaging a concentration of 25.5 kilograms per cubic metre (43.0 lb/cu yd). This leads to large amounts of sediment being deposited in the delta, with land growing at 3,240 hectares (8,000 acres) annually and the delta adding up to 2.2 kilometres (1.4 mi) in length each year.

== Wildlife ==
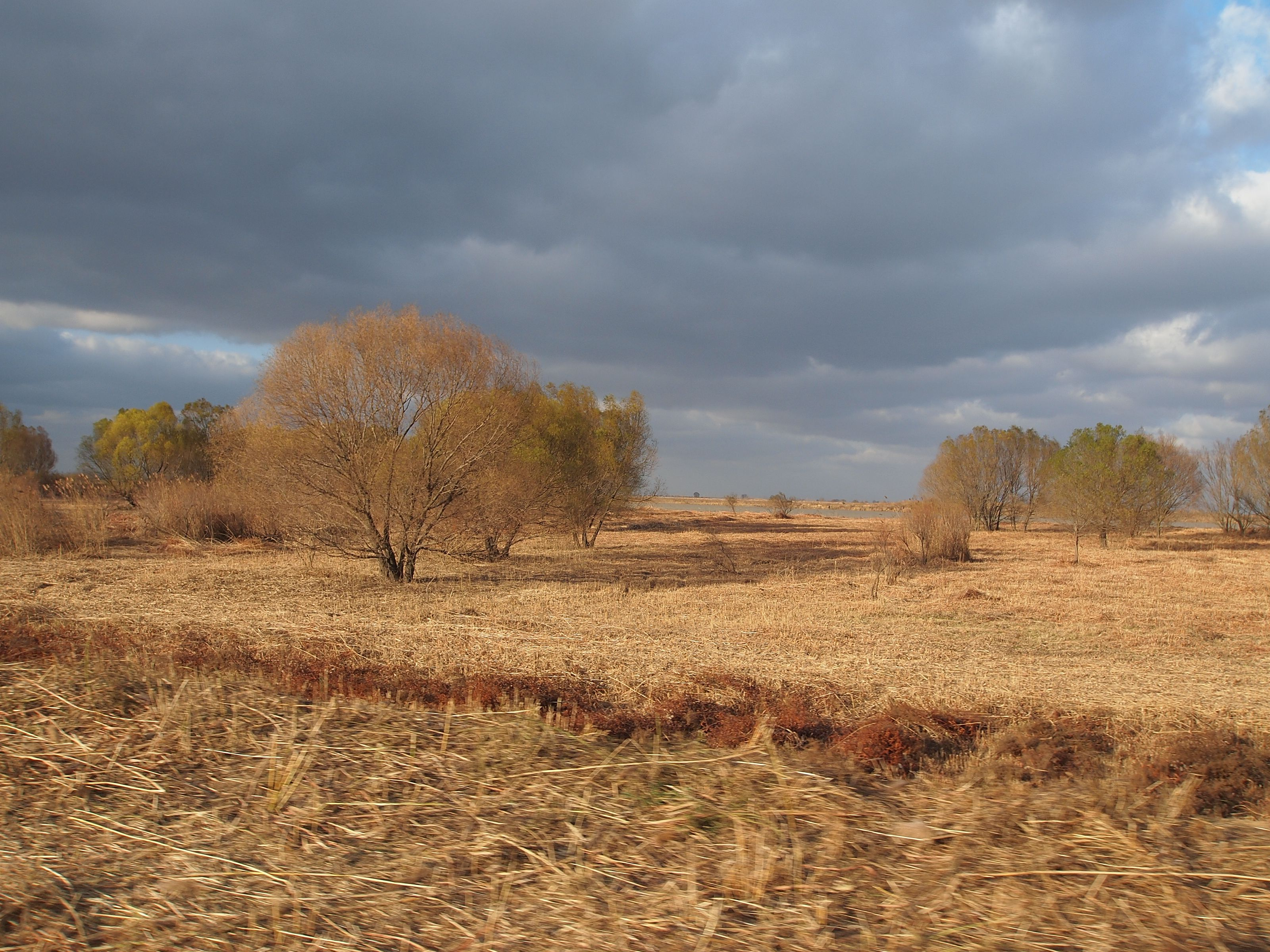
Willows and tamarisks on the mudflat of the delta

An estimate 685 species of plants have been found in the reserve. Conservation has seen populations of Suaeda salsa, Tamarix chinensis, and various reed species expand over the past few years. The threatened Glycine soja is also present in the reserve.

1,632 species of animals have been identified in the reserve, including 373 birds species, of which 91 have Grade I or Grade II state protection. Grade I species include the golden eagle, the great bustard, the hooded crane, the Oriental stork, the red-crowned crane, the scaly-sided merganser, and the white-tailed eagle. Many of these, along with the little curlew, Nordmann's greenshank, and the white-naped crane, are listed in CITES Appendix I.

The wetlands are an important stopover point for migrating birds in the East Asian–Australasian Flyway and the West Pacific Flyway. There are six main areas of bird habitat in the reserve: farmland and reed ditches, forest, reed and meadow wetlands, salt bush marshes, Suaeda vera mudflats, and water. The Suaeda mudflats occur in intertidal and estuarine areas, and provide habitats to crabs that are eaten by birds.

The reserve supports 10 crane species, including a wintering population of about 200 red-crowned cranes and 1,000 common cranes. Waterfowl present include 30 Anatidae species, including a wintering (November to April) population of 2,000 whooper swans. During migration, many waterfowl populations grow to over 10,000, including representatives of the 48 shorebird species whose populations can reach up to 1 million. The delta is the world's most important breeding ground for Oriental white storks, and the second largest breeding ground of Saunders's gulls. It also supports the second largest wintering population of Siberian cranes, and is the southern breeding limit of red-crowned cranes.

== Management ==
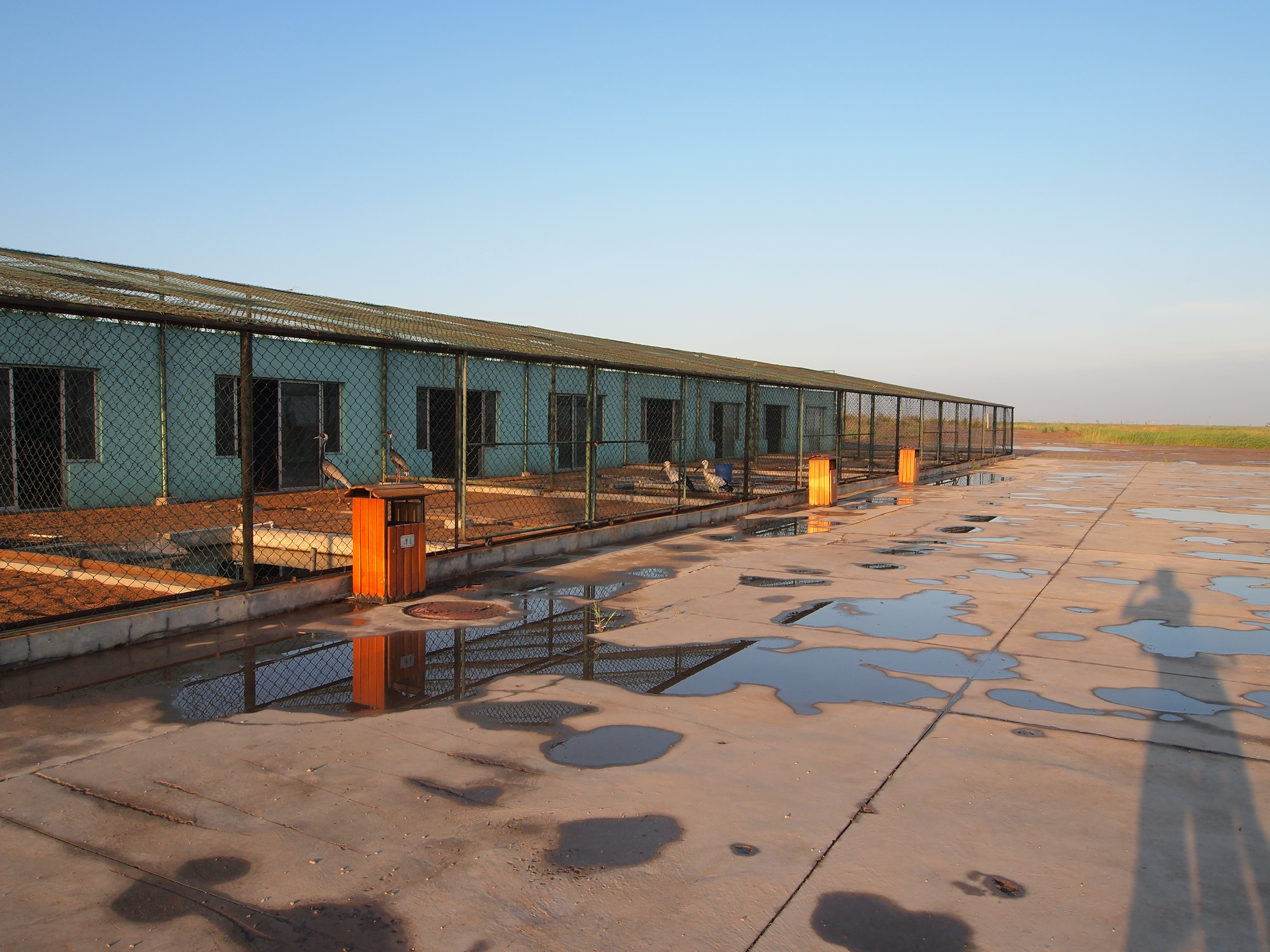
One of the bird rescue stations

The Shandong Yellow River Delta National Nature Reserve Administrative Bureau oversees all management activities including conservation and research, as well as coordinating with continuing human activities in the buffer zone. It lies under the authority of the Shandong Provincial Department and the National Forestry and Grassland Administration. The reserve is divided into 49 management areas, and water diversion to these areas from the Yellow River is controlled through a system of channels and sluices. Lijin hydrological station is situated at the river mouth.

Low water levels in the Yellow River, exacerbated by increased farming inland, began to dry up the wetlands in the mid-1980s, although management actions since then seek to alleviate this pressure. A Yellow River Protection Law came into force in 2023 to regulate water use along the entire river. Coastal erosion and seawater encroachment similarly reduced wetland area. Land reclamation and pollution, especially from oil extraction, are other major sources of potential environmental degradation. Dongying city supported 17 different protection and restoration efforts in the delta as of 2023, including programs to rehabilitate seagrass meadows and populations of Suaeda salsa, and to eliminate the invasive Sporobolus alterniflorus. Wetland restoration efforts begun by the Reserve Administration Bureau in 2002 have reversed the historical degradation of the area. Efforts to supplement water flowing to the Diaokou River estuary began in June 2010. While the main Yellow River is now relatively clean, tributary rivers are affected by industrial pollution. This has caused eutrophication in the sea water near the river mouth, the appearance of red tides, and pollutants entering the local food chain.

Restoration and rehabilitation efforts have significantly increased bird diversity and populations. Only 187 bird species were recorded in 1993. The Oriental stork population has grown, with 470 chicks hatched in 2022, many on islands created in the middle of waterways. Overall 2,200 Oriental storks have hatched in the reserve since 2003, a substantial contribution to a global population of only around 3,000.

Parts of the reserve were designated a Ramsar Convention Wetland of International Importance in 2013 as Ramsar Site no. 2187. Many migratory species and related habitats fall under the a bilaterial treaties with Australia and Japan. There are plans to expand the reserve into a 3,518 square kilometres (1,358 sq mi) national park, which would be China's first national park covering both land and water.

== Tourism ==
The Yellow River Estuary Eco-tourism Area has been designated a national 5A-level tourist attraction. Dongying City as a whole has been designated the "Hometown of the Oriental White Storks in China" (中国东方白鹳之乡).

Natural features in the reserve include the "red carpet", formed by the halophyte Suaeda salsa, which accumulates salts through its roots giving its branches and leaves a red colour. These plants tend to change from green to red in autumn. Wooden walkways have been built through the wetlands to facilitate tourist access.
