= East Atlantic Flyway =

Migration route used by many bird species

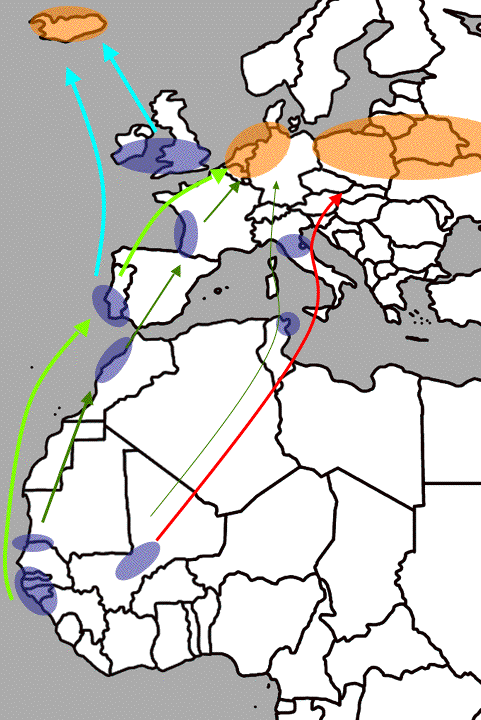

The East Atlantic Flyway is a migration route used by about 90 million birds annually, passing from their breeding areas in the United States, Canada, Greenland, Iceland, Siberia and northern Europe to wintering areas in western Europe and on to southern Africa. It is one of the eight major flyways used by waders and shorebirds. The migrants follow a great circle route, which is shorter although more challenging. When avoiding the barriers created by the Sahara Desert and Atlas Mountains, European honey buzzards were found to overcompensate for the winds they expected to encounter, and take a longer route than was necessary.

Wetlands International has identified key sites on the flyway in the project Wings Over Wetlands. Important sites on the flyway include:

- Lake Ladoga (northwestern Russia)
- Haapsalu, Matsalu (Estonia)
- Nemunas Delta (Lithuanian demonstration site)
- Wadden Sea (Netherlands, Germany, Denmark)
- Vendée Reserve (France)
- Doñana National Park (Spain)
- Merja Zerga (Morocco)
- Banc d'Arguin National Park (Mauritania)
- Diawling-Djoudj (Senegal, Mauritania)
- Saloum-Niumi (Senegal, Gambia)
- Archipel Bijagos (Guinea-Bissau)

The flyway attracted attention in the 2000s when birds using the route were found to have been carrying influenza A virus subtype H5N1, the causative agent of avian influenza ("bird flu").
