= Flyway =

Flight path used by large numbers of migrating birds

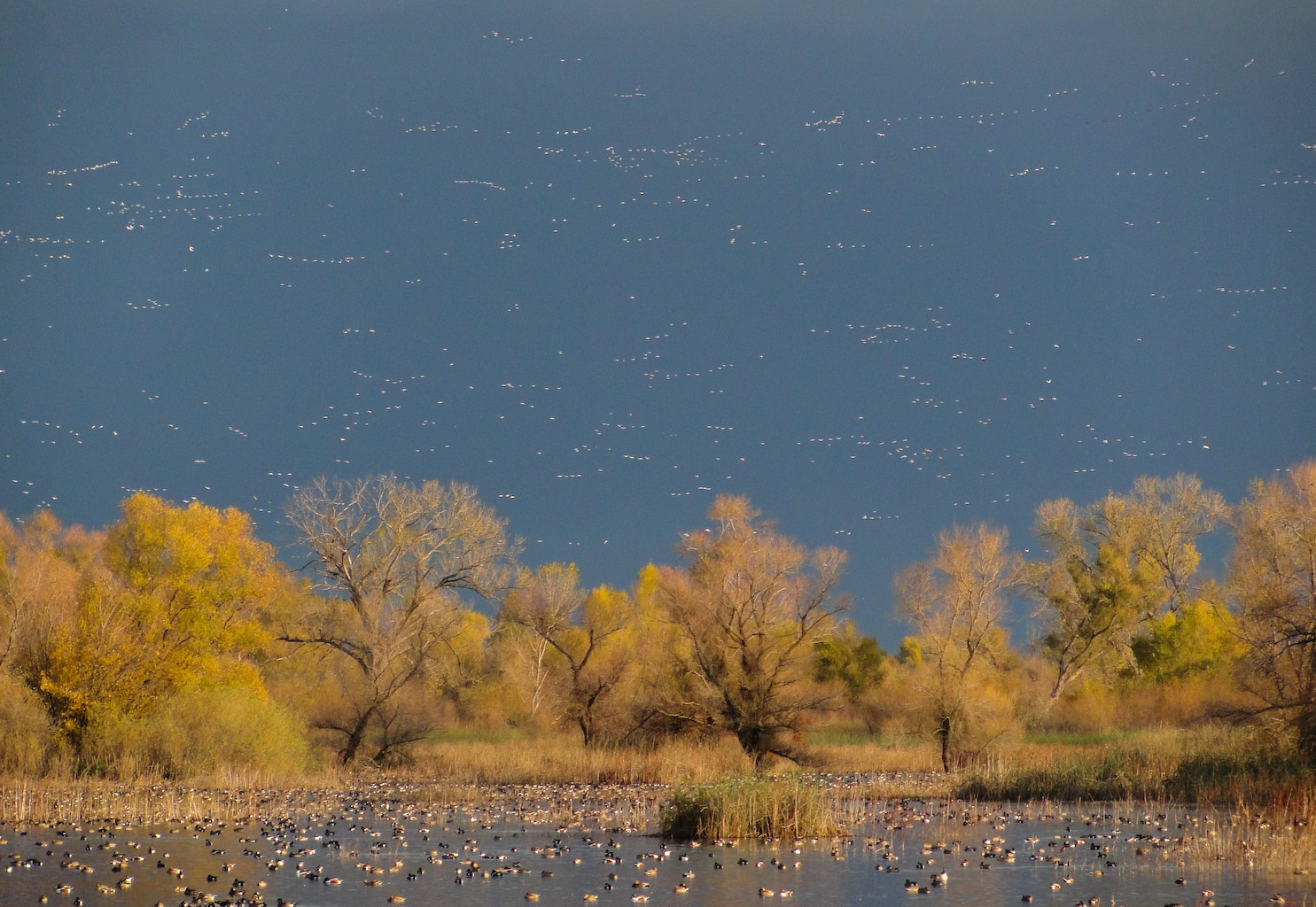
Waterfowl arriving in California's Central Valley, a staging point on the Pacific Flyway

A flyway is a flight path used by large numbers of birds while migrating between their breeding grounds and their overwintering quarters. Flyways generally span continents and often pass over oceans. Although it applies to any species of migrating bird, the concept was first conceived and applied to waterfowl and shore birds. The flyways can be thought of as wide arterial highways to which the migratory routes of different species are tributaries. An alternative definition is that a flyway is the entire range of a migratory bird, encompassing both its breeding and non-breeding grounds, and the resting and feeding locations it uses while migrating. There are four major north–south flyways in North America and six covering Eurasia, Africa, and Australasia.

== History ==
The passing of the Migratory Bird Treaty Act of 1918 in the United States resulted in a need for more information on bird migration. Frederick Charles Lincoln was put in charge and improved methods for trapping and banding, developed record-keeping procedures, recruited banders, fostered international cooperation, and promoted banding as a tool for research and wildlife management. He found it was possible to establish the routes used by waterfowl during their annual migrations and he developed the flyway concept, a key idea in the management and regulation of hunting of migratory birds; by establishing the routes used, estimates of population sizes could be made and suitable protection could be put in place.

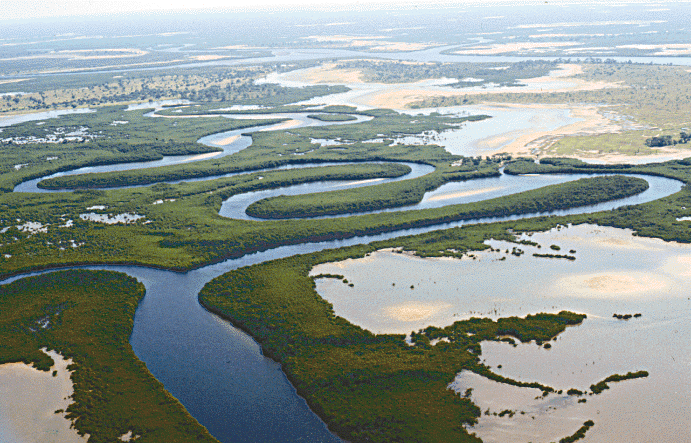
The Saloum Delta in Senegal, on the East Atlantic Flyway

The special vulnerability of waterfowl and shorebirds on their international migrations, with their specific needs for suitable wetland stopovers, resulted in the signing of the Ramsar Convention in 1971. As a result, over 2300 Ramsar sites have been established around the world, many being situated on flyways where they provide the vital habitat needed by the birds on their journeys.

== Flyways ==
"The concept of flyway is essentially an operational concept
linked to waterfowl whose populations one wishes
to manage over their entire migration space."

—Convention on the Conservation of Migratory Species of Wild Animals.

Many bird populations migrate long distances twice a year. The most common pattern involves flying north in the spring to breed in the temperate parts of the northern hemisphere or the Arctic during summer and returning southward in the autumn to wintering grounds in warmer regions, often on the other side of the equator. A similar pattern occurs in the southern hemisphere with birds flying south to breed and north to overwinter, but on a much smaller scale. The flyway, or route, taken by different bird species varies, but each population has its traditional staging points along the route where birds feed to build up their energy reserves to prepare for the next migratory stage; the route used on the spring migration may be different from that used in the autumn and will depend on such factors as wind direction and the availability of food at staging points.

Flyways may not be the shortest route available but may have curves or doglegs. Birds of different species may follow similar routes, and populations from one area may merge with other groups and diverge to reach different destinations. Flyways tend to avoid obstacles such as mountain ranges and oceans, running parallel to the barriers and following routes along the coast or along major river valleys. Passerines often fly on a broader front across the terrain, either flying over or circumventing obstacles on the route, according to their evolutionary adaptations. In selecting routes, birds may overcompensate for predicted winds. Terrestrial birds tend to travel over land, raptors need routes where thermals can give them the lift they require, sea birds prefer ocean routes and wetland birds need routes with suitable staging sites; deltas and coastal wetlands provide reliable food sources for this purpose whereas inland wetlands are less predictable.

== Flyways of the Americas ==
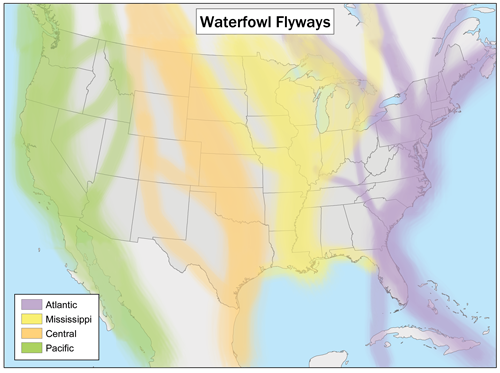
Flyways over the United States.

In North America, the flyways used by migratory waterfowl are divided into four geographical paths. Each flyway has a different composition of species and habitat. The United States Fish and Wildlife Service established the flyways to help with the management of migratory birds. They studied all migratory birds and established the Mississippi Flyway, Atlantic Flyway, Mountain Flyway, and Pacific Flyway.

The Atlantic Flyway starts in northern Canada and Greenland and follows the East Coast of the United States to the Caribbean Sea, and on to the tropical Central America. Examples of birds in this flyway are the American Goldfinch, Blue Jay, and Northern Cardinal.

The Mississippi Flyway starts from northeastern Canada and passes over the Great Lakes, following the lower Ohio River, the Missouri and the Mississippi to the Gulf of Mexico, and on to Central and South America. There are no mountains on this route. Examples of birds in this flyway are the Black-capped Chickadee, Baltimore Oriole, and House Finch.

The Central Flyway starts from central Canada and crosses the Great Plains before continuing southwards to the Gulf of Mexico, merging with the Mississippi Flyway. There are no mountain barriers on this route. Examples of birds in this flyway are the American Crow, American Robin, Common Grackle.

The Pacific Flyway is a north–south flyway for birds migrating from breeding grounds in Alaska and Canada to their overwintering areas in South America, some species travelling as far south as Patagonia. Examples of birds in this flyway are the Northern Flicker, Purple Finch, and Rufous Hummingbird.

The Allegheny Front flyway in the central Appalachian Mountains is an important flyway for migratory birds traveling from their northern breeding grounds to their southern wintering sites.

== Flyways of Eurasia, Africa, and Australasia ==
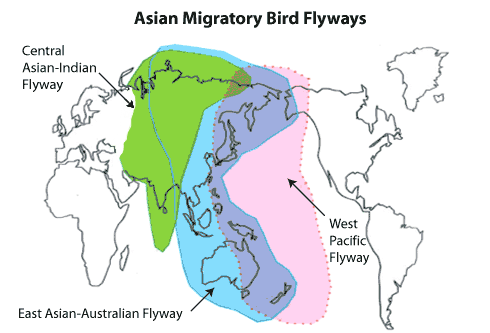
Central Asian-Indian, East Asian-Australasian and West Pacific migratory bird flyways

The East Atlantic Flyway starts from northern North America, Greenland, Iceland, northern Europe and western Siberia and leads to wintering areas in western Europe and North Africa, with some birds continuing down the west coast of the continent to South Africa.

The Black Sea-Mediterranean Flyway starts from northern and western Siberia and leads across Asia, the Black Sea and the Mediterranean Sea to northern Africa. Little has been published about birds using this flyway.

The Asian–East African Flyway starts from the northern breeding grounds of water birds in Siberia and leads across Asia to East Africa. Little has been published about birds using this flyway.

The Central Asian-Indian Flyway starts from the northern breeding grounds of water birds in Siberia and leads across Asia to the Indian subcontinent. Little has been published about birds using this flyway.

The East Asian–Australasian Flyway starts at the Taymyr Peninsula in Russia and Alaska and extends southwards to southeastern Asia, Australia and New Zealand. This flyway overlaps with the West Pacific Flyway. About 60 species of shorebird use this route.

The West Pacific Flyway links New Zealand and the east coast of Australia, through the central Pacific Ocean and the east coast of northern Asia, including Japan and the Korean Peninsula, ending up in eastern Siberia, including the Chukchi and Kamchatka peninsulas, and Alaska. This flyway overlaps with the East Asian–Australasian Flyway.
