= Thudayannoor =

Village in Ittiva Grama Panchayath, Kollam district, Kerala, India

Coordinates: 8.857°N 76.947°E

Thudayannoor is a village located in Ittiva Grama Panchayath in the eastern part of Kollam district, Kerala state, India. It is 2 km away from Oil Pam India Ltd (plantation), 57 km from Trivandrum and 42 km from Kollam town. The Kadakkal - Anchal road passes through the village.

The village is an important business centre, with Kattampally market and Manaluvattom market and businesses including rubber, coconut, tapioca and blackpepper. The nearest towns are Kadakkal and Anchal. Its Pincode is 691536. Education institutions are Kattampally UPS and Kavitha; Thudayannoor Service Cooperative Bank is the major bank in the locality. Kanyarkayam waterfall located 2 km away from thudayannoor in Oil Palm India Ltd is a major attraction of Thudayannoor, people from far distances also come here to visit this waterfall.

== Places of worship ==
The village has Five temples: Athishayamangalam Temple, Chavarukavu, Moolabounder Temple, Arathakandappan Temple Chattara devi temple & Arthanariswara Temple.

== See also ==
- Kattampally
- Kadakkal
