= Shengli =

Shengli may refer to:

- Shengli Oil Field
- Shengli, a township in Yongning County, Ningxia, China
- Shengli, a township in Tangyuan County, Heilongjiang, China
