= Lake Chilwa =

Lake in Malawi

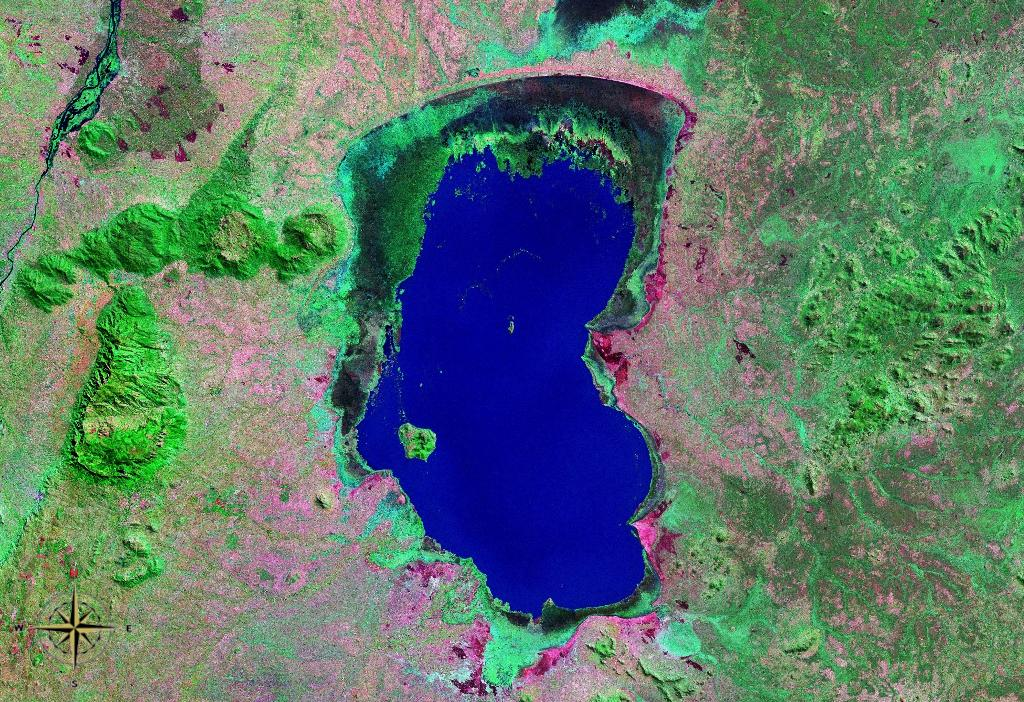
- seen from space (false color)

- Location within Malawi
- Location: Zomba District
- Coordinates: 15°18′S 35°42′E
- Primary inflows: Naisi, Thondwe, Phalombe, Songani, Domasi
- Primary outflows: none
- Basin countries: Malawi
- Max. length: 60 km (37 mi)
- Max. width: 40 km (25 mi)
- Islands: Chisi

Ramsar Wetland
- Designated: 14 November 1996
- Reference no.: 869

Lake Chilwa is the second-largest lake in Malawi after Lake Malawi. It is in eastern Zomba District, near the border with Mozambique. Approximately 60 km long and 40 km wide, the lake is surrounded by extensive wetlands. There is an island in the middle of the lake called Chisi Island. The lake has no outlet, and the level of water is greatly affected by seasonal rains and summer evaporation. In 1968, the lake disappeared during exceptionally dry weather. When David Livingstone visited the lake in 1859, he reported that its southern boundary reached as far as the Mulanje Massif, which would have made the lake at least 32 kilometres (20 mi) longer than it is today.

The Danish International Development Agency, in cooperation with the Government of Malawi has been working to ensure preservation of the lake and its wetlands. The Lake Chilwa Basin Climate Change Adaption Programme (LCBCCAP) has been introduced to conserve the sensitive area, which is not only an important wetland for local fauna, but also a major source for fish products in the region.

== Wildlife ==
The most common fish species of Lake Chilwa are Barbus paludinosus, Oreochromis shiranus chilwae, Clarias gariepinus, Brycinus imberi and Gnathonemus. The lake supports a waterbird population of around 1.5 million with about 160 different species. Some of these migrate along the Asian - East African Flyway from Siberia each year. With twelve bird species, the number is over 1% of their total flyway population. The surrounding human population is dense and growing, and waterbirds are hunted for food when the water level is low and fishing is problematic. Efforts are being made to ensure that hunting is done in a sustainable manner.

== Economy ==
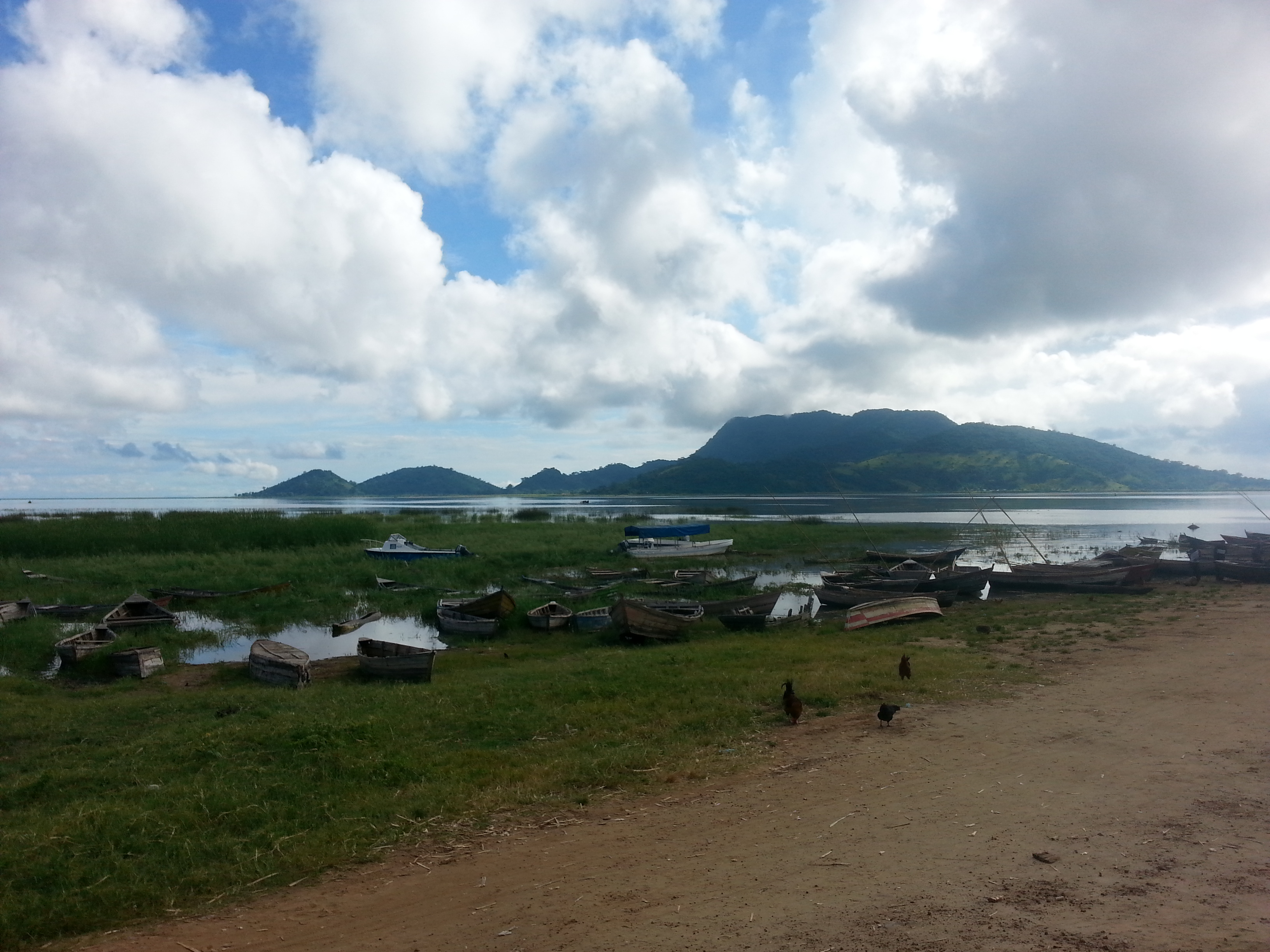
Western shore of Lake Chilwa, Chisi Island in the distance.

About 335 villages with over 60,000 inhabitants engage in fishing the lake, and pull in over 17,000 metric tons each year, 20% of all the fish caught in Malawi.
