= Chisi Island =

Island in Malawi

Coordinates: 15.3333°S 35.6167°E

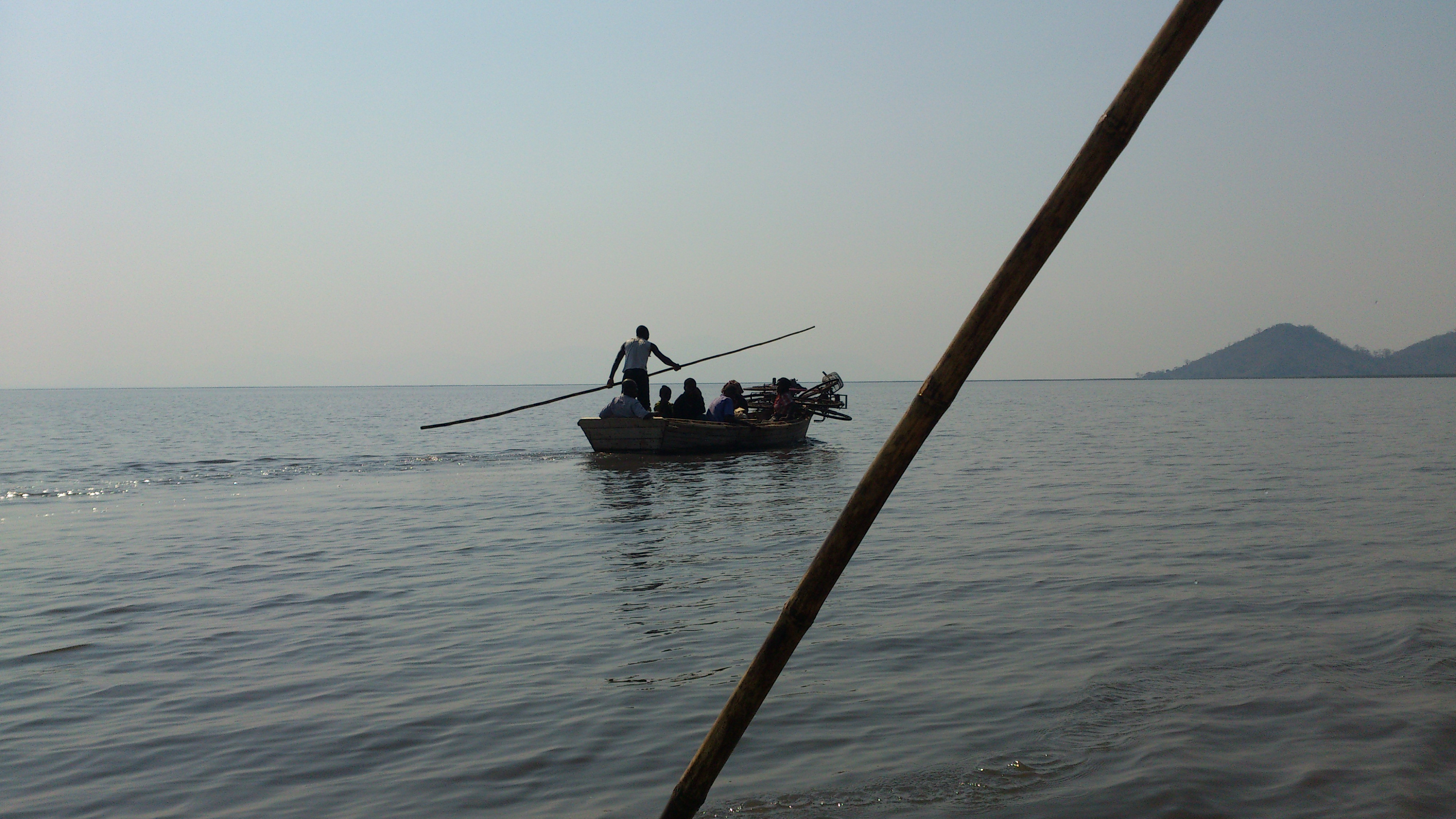
Punters are in use on lake Chilwa, Malawi to transport goods and people to shore. Hand-built boats with stern are used to master the 2,5 km stretch, reaching about 3-4 metres at its deepest point.

Chisi Island is a small island in the middle of Lake Chilwa. Lake Chilwa is the second largest lake in Malawi. The natives of the island have a wide knowledge of forest and lake usage. There are a few fortified sanctuaries built into the island's hills. Chisi Island is home to Mchenga, a large tree much wider than two humans standing side by side. Chisi Island is sometimes referred to as the most remote location in Malawi.

A BBC reporter visited in 2000 and he found a tribe of people living in houses that float on reed rafts. Two thousand people lived like that and only a small number of them had ever been to the mainland. The two islands they used were Chisi and Thongwe Island. Cholera was endemic. A hospital had been constructed but it had not then been staffed.

3,500 people live on the island. In 2018 the Lake began to dry up. People who fished for a living and for subsistence turned to creating charcoal from the island's trees to make money as the lake receded.
