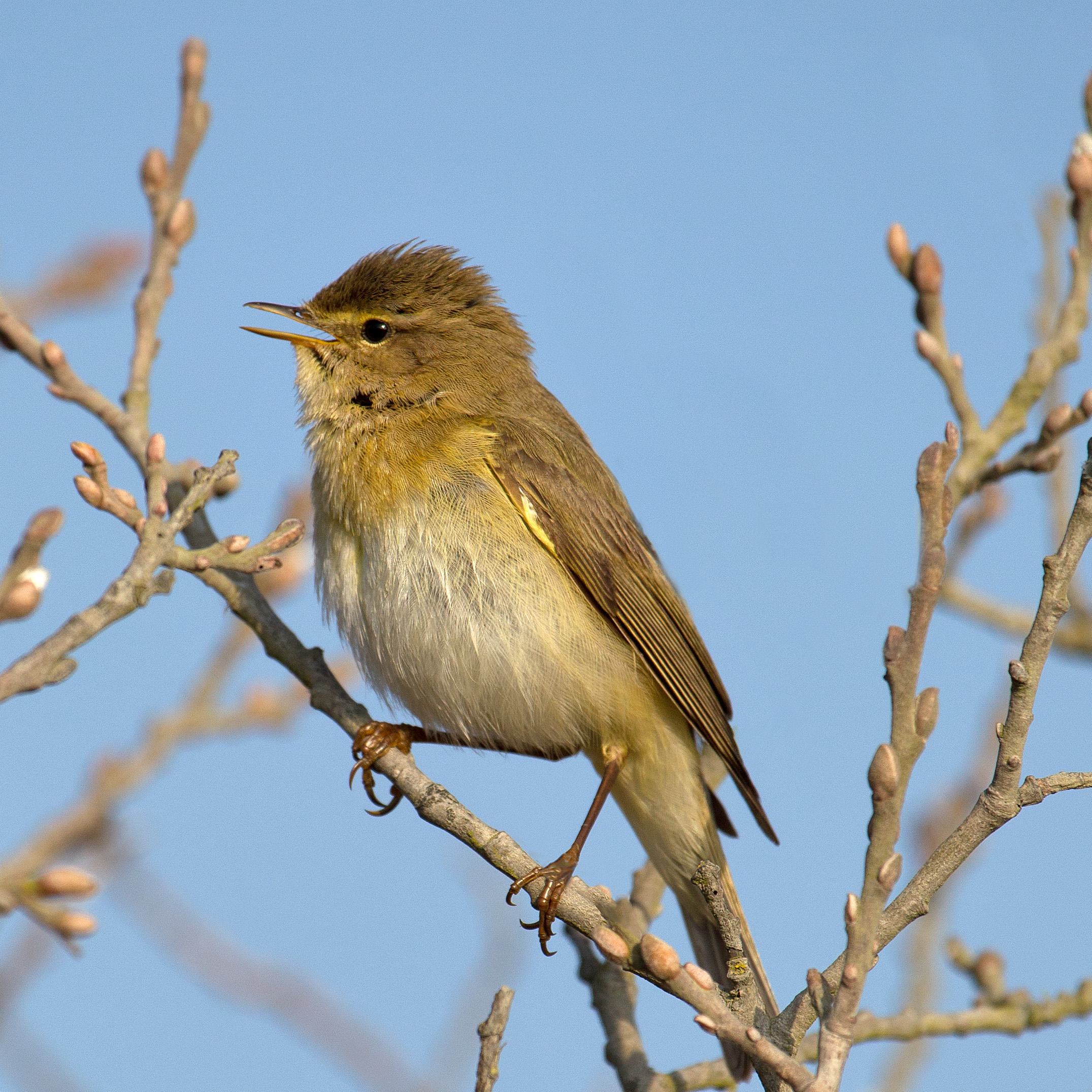

Conservation status
- Least Concern (IUCN 3.1)

Scientific classification
- Kingdom: Animalia
- Phylum: Chordata
- Class: Aves
- Order: Passeriformes
- Family: Phylloscopidae
- Genus: Phylloscopus
- Species: P. trochilus

Binomial name
- Phylloscopus trochilus (Linnaeus, 1758)

Subspecies
- P. t. trochilus (Linnaeus, 1758); P. t. acredula (Linnaeus, 1758); P. t. yakutensis (Ticehurst, 1935)
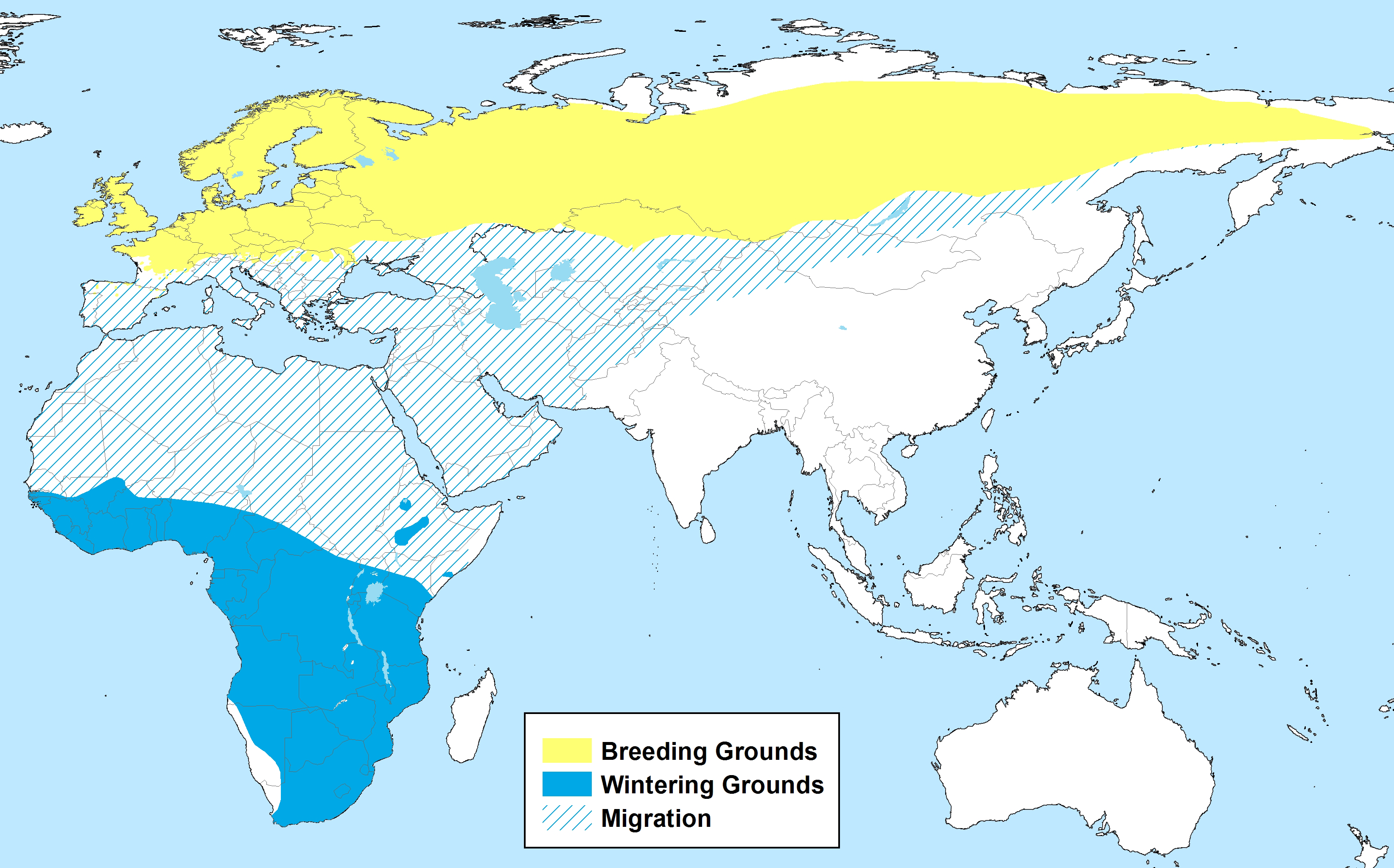
- Yellow: Breeding (summer only); Blue: Non-breeding winter visitor Cross-hatched: migration.

Synonyms
- Motacilla trochilus Linnaeus, 1758

Audio

= Willow warbler =

Species of bird

The willow warbler (Phylloscopus trochilus) is a very common and widespread leaf warbler which breeds throughout northern and temperate Europe and the Palearctic, from Ireland east to the Anadyr River basin in eastern Siberia. It is strongly migratory, with almost all of the population wintering in sub-Saharan Africa.

It is a bird of open woodlands with trees and ground cover for nesting, including most importantly birch, alder, and willow habitats. The nest is usually built in close contact with the ground, often in low vegetation. Like most Old World warblers (Sylviidae), this small passerine is insectivorous. In northern Europe, it is one of the first warblers to return in the spring, though later than the closely related chiffchaff. In spite of its small size, the willow warbler performs one of the longest migrations of any animal.

== Taxonomy ==
The willow warbler was formally described by the Swedish naturalist Carl Linnaeus in 1758 in the tenth edition of his Systema Naturae under the binomial name Motacilla trochilus. The willow warbler is now one of around 80 species placed in the genus Phylloscopus that was introduced by the German zoologist Friedrich Boie in 1826. The genus name combines the Ancient Greek phullon meaning "leaf" and skopos meaning "seeker" (from skopeo, "to watch"). The specific epithet is Ancient Greek meaning "wren".

Before the English name was standardised to willow warbler by William Yarrell in 1843, it alongside the chiffchaff and wood warbler were considered to be a single bird known as the "willow wren".

Three subspecies are recognised. There is a clinal reduction in green and yellow plumage tones from west to east, with central birds browner and easternmost birds predominantly greyish:

- P. t. trochilus (Linnaeus, 1758). Breeds Europe (from the Pyrenees and Alps northward) except northern Scandinavia, winters west Africa.
- P. t. acredula (Linnaeus, 1758). Breeds northern Scandinavia east to western Siberia, winters central Africa.
- P. t. yakutensis (Ticehurst, 1935). Breeds eastern Siberia, winters eastern and southern Africa.

== Description ==
The willow warbler is a typical leaf warbler in appearance, 11–12.5 cm (4.3–4.9 in) long and 7–15 g (0.25–0.53 oz) weight. It is greenish brown above and off-white to yellowish below; the wings are plain greenish-brown with no wingbars. Juveniles are yellower below than adults. It is very similar to the chiffchaff, but non-singing birds can be distinguished from that species by their paler pinkish-yellow legs (dark brown to blackish in chiffchaff), longer paler bill, more elegant shape and longer primary projection (wingtip). Its song is a simple repetitive descending whistle, while the contact call is a disyllabic 'hoo-eet', distinct from the more monosyllabic 'hweet' of chiffchaffs.

== Behaviour ==
All populations are highly migratory, with the subspecies P. t. yakutensis migrating up to 12,000 km (7,500 mi) from eastern Siberia to southern Africa along the Asian–East African Flyway, one of the longest migrations of any for a bird of its size. Approximate timings are:

- October to March: wintering in sub-Saharan Africa.
- Mid-March to mid-May: migrates and arrives in the breeding range.
- Late April to August: breeding season, usually only one brood but rarely two.
- August to October: migrates back to Africa.

They are very rare vagrants to Alaska, with sightings in St. Lawrence Island.

== Status and conservation ==
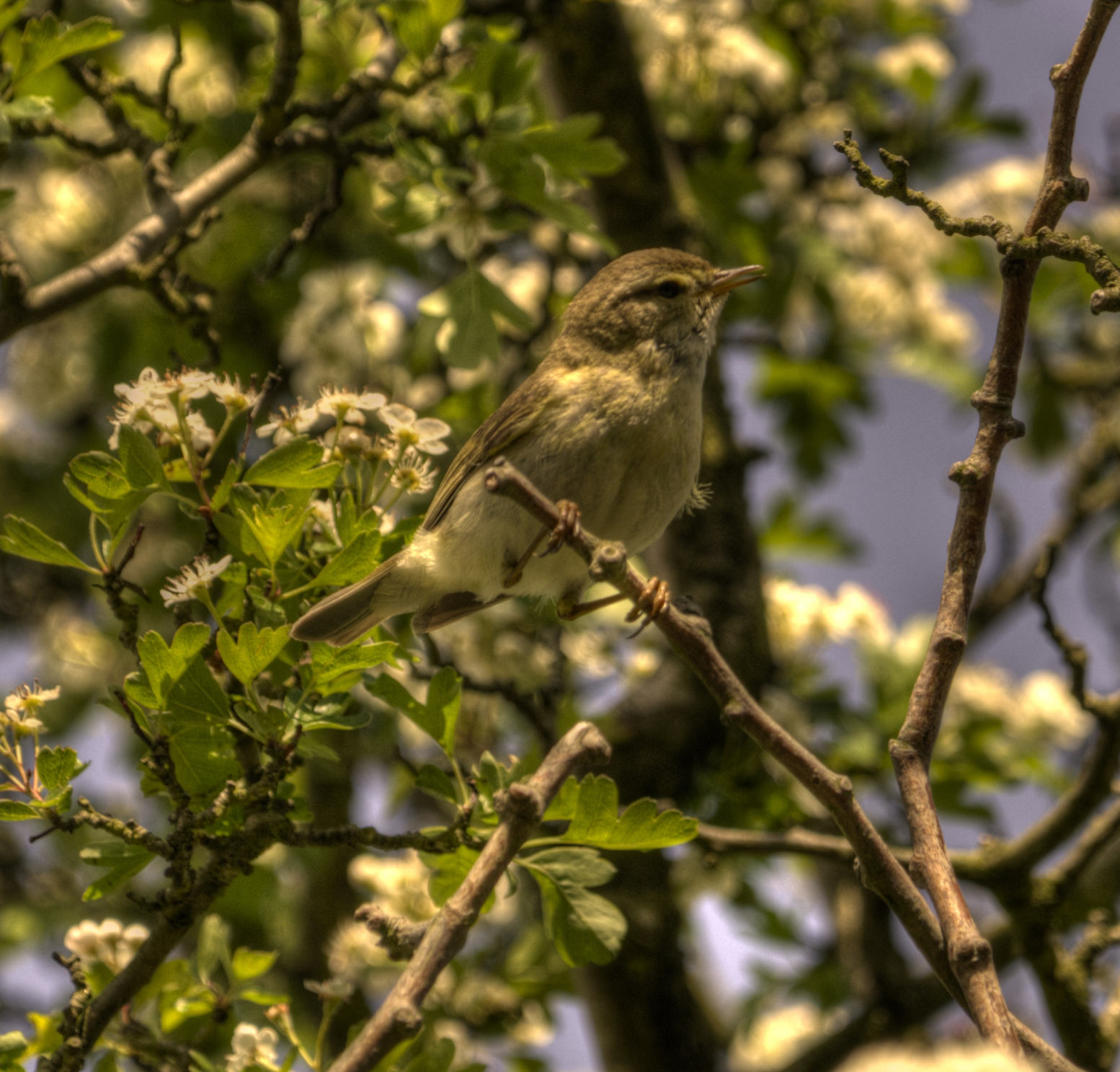

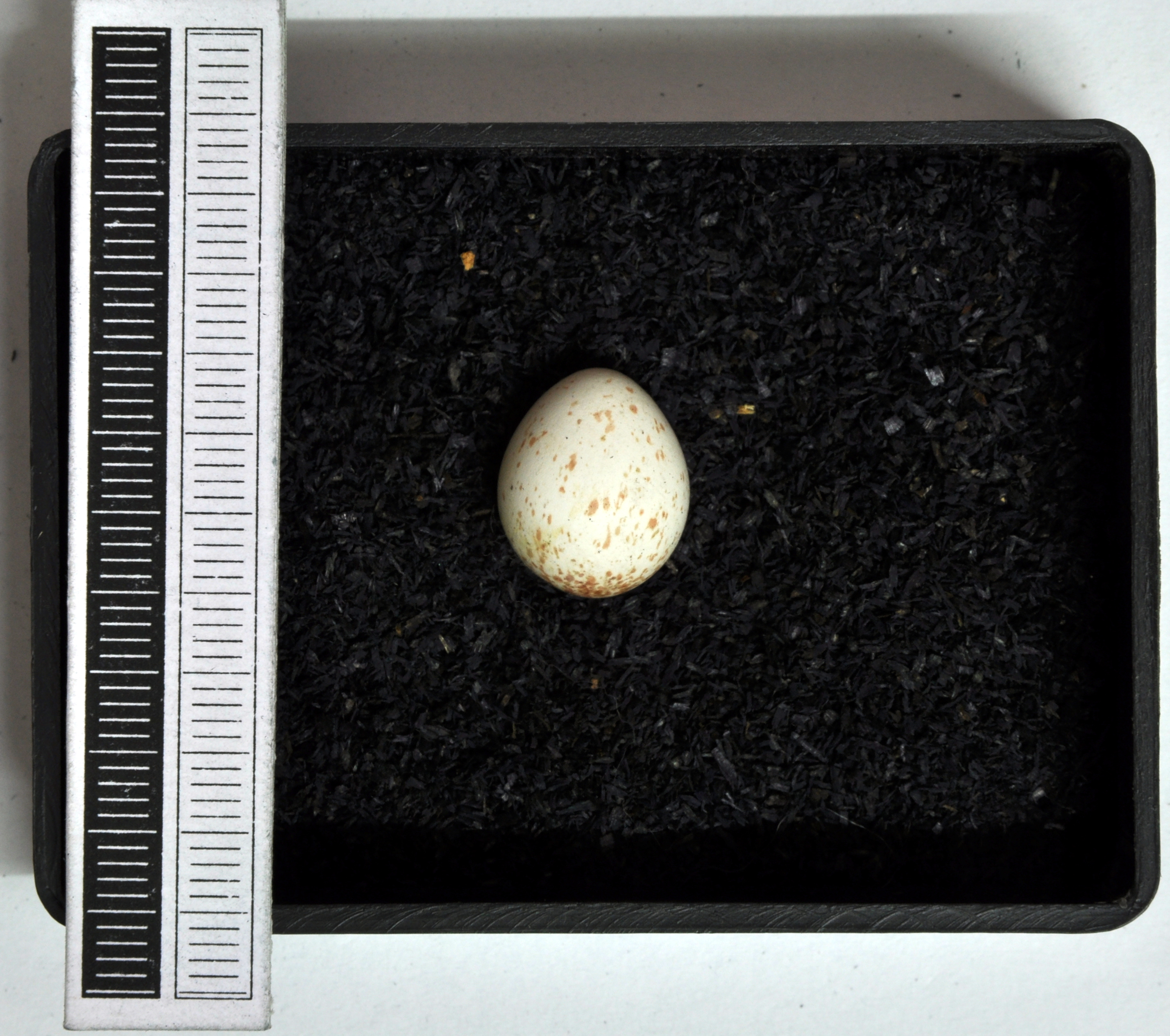
Egg, Collection Museum Wiesbaden, Germany

Willow warblers prefer young, open, scrubby woodland with small trees, including human-altered habitats such as coppice and young plantations up to 10–20 years old. High amounts of birch, alder and willow, with good lichen amounts, and water features (e.g. streams), fields with large amounts of bracken and mosses, and patches of low bramble (for nest cover) are preferred, but it will use a wide range of other species, including young or open coniferous forests. Incorporating woodland ride edge thickets of varying structure and height is beneficial. They prefer damp woodland areas. Thicket forming shrubs like blackthorn provide pockets of habitat. Deer browsing can degrade the required low cover.

The highest population densities are found in Scandinavia (where it is the commonest bird of any), with up to 1,100 pairs per square kilometre, and a total population in Sweden and Finland of 24 million pairs. Lower densities occur further east, with peak densities of 27 pairs per square kilometre in central Siberia. Even lower densities are found on the southern edge of the breeding range, with just 9 pairs per square kilometre in Switzerland, and a total of just 100 pairs in the whole of northern Spain.

In England this species has on average decreased in population by 70% within the last 25 years, with the biggest declines in the southeast. In Scotland some increases have occurred. The Forestry Commission offers grants under a scheme called England's Woodland Improvement Grant (EWIG); as does Natural England's Environmental Stewardship Scheme.
