= Asian–East African Flyway =

Bird migration routes

The Asian–East African Flyway (Note: BirdLife International uses the term "East Asian - East African Flyway". The Food and Agriculture Organization and others call it the "West Asian - East African Flyway") is a group of well-established routes by which many species of birds migrate annually between mid-Palearctic breeding grounds in Asia and non-breeding sites in eastern and southern Africa.

== Route ==
The flyway covers an area of 56,731,881 square kilometres (21,904,302 sq mi) and spans 64 countries from South Africa and Madagascar to Eastern Siberia and Alaska. The indirect route, where the birds fly west and then south rather than directly south, avoids the obstacle of the Tibetan Plateau and the Himalayas. The birds usually migrate quickly from the Palaeartic to northeast Africa, reaching Ethiopia or Northern Sudan by late August or September. Some birds then remain in northern Africa for most of the fall before heading south either via Uganda and the Lake Victoria basin or via the Kenyan highlands. In the spring, many birds complete the return journey in six weeks or less, usually taking a route along the coast of East Africa.

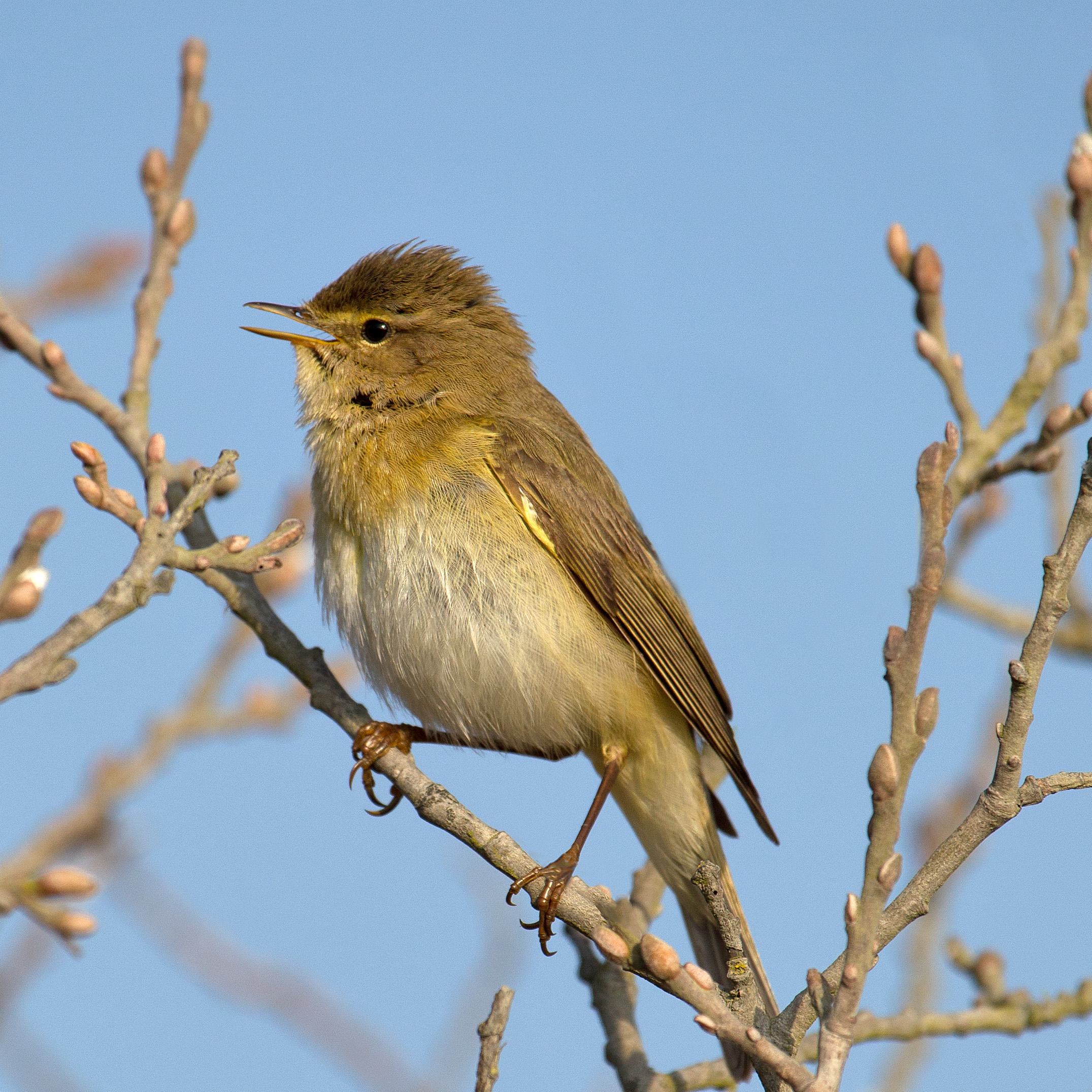
Willow warbler

331 species use the flyway. Seven sites along the route have over a million birds. About 25 species come from the far eastern Palearctic or even from Alaska. These include the northern wheatear, willow warbler and barn swallow. The willow warbler is the most numerous of the birds migrating along this route, accounting for 15.8% of the total number of passerines and near-passerines. Raptors such as the steppe buzzard also migrate along the flyway in large numbers.

Some species follow variants of the route. The Amur falcon breeds in northeastern Asia and overwinters in southern Africa, making a round-trip journey of 22,000 kilometres (14,000 mi). Most of these birds fly south along the eastern edge of the Tibetan Plateau and stop in northeastern India and Bangladesh for several months. In late November the falcons cross India and fly in great flocks 3,000 kilometres (1,900 mi) over the Indian Ocean to Somalia and Kenya. They return via the Arabian peninsula, Iran, Afghanistan and Pakistan.

== Concerns ==
The populations of birds that depend on the flyway are threatened. Changes in land use that cause deterioration or loss of wetlands is a major factor. Changes in agricultural practices, use of pesticides and recreational hunting are also threats. Hunting, on the rise in the Middle East, causes direct loss of life and indirect damage through lead pollution. Twenty of the species that use the flyway are globally threatened. These include the northern bald ibis, sociable lapwing, spotted ground-thrush and Basra reed-warbler. Data on the bird populations using this flyway are limited. It is only possible to assess trends for 35% of the wader species. Of these, 53% are in decline.

Lake Chilwa in the south of Malawi illustrates the problem. The lake supports a waterbird population of around 1.5 million with about 160 species. With 12 species, the number is over 1% of their total flyway population. The local human population is dense and growing, and hunts waterbirds in large numbers as a source of protein when fish stocks are low. Efforts are being made to ensure that this hunting is done in a sustainable manner. The Asian – East African Flyway largely lies within the area covered by the African Eurasian Migratory Waterbird Agreement (AEWA), which had 59 signatory states as of 2007. This agreement covers 235 species for which conservation measures would be put in place.

Flyways overlap. Birds from the eastern Palaeartic breeding grounds also migrate to south-east and south Asia, and birds from eastern Europe and the Caucasus migrate to the wintering areas in east Africa. Wild migratory birds appear to play a significant role in distribution of avian influenza and in introduction of new viruses to resident and domestic birds.

== Sources ==
- Bildstein, Keith L. (2006). Migrating raptors of the world: their ecology & conservation. Cornell University Press. ISBN 0-8014-4179-X.
- Birdlife International. "East Asia/East Africa Flyway" (PDF).
- Boere, G. C.; Galbraith, Colin A.; Stroud, David A. (2006). Waterbirds around the world: a global overview of the conservation, management and research of the world's waterbird flyways. The Stationery Office. ISBN 0-11-497333-4.
- CMS Secretariat (November 2007). "Strategic Review of Flyway Paper" (PDF). United Nations Environment Programme.
- Diouf, Jacques (November 2005). "Emergency assistance for early detection and prevention of avian influenza in eastern and southern Africa" (PDF). FAO.
- Wader Study Group (2003). "Waders are declining worldwide" (PDF). Archived from the original (PDF) on 22 April 2012.
