= Wetlands International =

Non-profit organization

Wetlands International is a global organisation that works to sustain and restore wetlands and their resources for people and biodiversity. It is an independent, not-for-profit, global organisation, supported by government and NGO membership from around the world.

Based mostly in the developing world, it has 20 regional, national or project offices in all continents and a head office in Ede, the Netherlands. The NGO works in over 100 countries and at different scales to tackle problems affecting wetlands. With the support of dozens of governmental, NGO and corporate donors and partners, it supports about 80 projects.

Wetlands International's work ranges from research and community-based field projects to advocacy and engagement with governments, corporate and international policy fora and conventions. Wetlands International works through partnerships and is supported by contributions from an extensive specialist expert network and thousands of volunteers.

== History ==
It was founded in 1937 as the International Wildfowl Inquiry and the organisation was focused on the protection of waterbirds. Later, the name became International Waterfowl & Wetlands Research Bureau (IWRB). The scope became wider; besides waterbirds, the organisation was also working on the protection of wetland areas.

Later, organisations with similar objectives emerged in Asia and the Americas: the Asian Wetland Bureau (AWB) (initiated as INTERWADER in 1983) and Wetlands for the Americas (WA) (initiated in 1989). In 1991, the three organisations started to work closely together.

In 1995, the working relation developed into the global organisation Wetlands International.

Wetlands International works in many thematic areas throughout the world, including the links between peatlands and climate change, as well as wetlands and waterbird migration, based on extensive research as well as field projects. It coordinates the International Waterbird Census, a large-scale citizen science project with decades of data.

== Key areas of work ==
Currently, Wetlands International has four primary areas of work, which are:

=== Peatlands ===
Wetlands International's peatlands work is focused in Eurasia and southeast Asia. The peatswamp forests of Central Kalimantan, Indonesia, are studied and worked on in particular for climate mitigation. The project Restoring peatlands in Russia is a joint-effort with the government and Greifeswald University, and was recognised by the UNFCCC with a Momentum for Change award in 2017, for storing up to 200,000 tonnes CO_{2}e of carbon emissions every year by rewetting peatlands and preventing fires.

In the severely degraded peat lands of Central Kalimantan, drainage canals and logging have had disastrous impacts in an attempt to convert the unsuitable peatswamps into rice fields. By building small dams and blocks, the drainage of the area was stopped, preventing further oxidation of the peat soil. The area was then reforested with native tree species and community fire brigades to prevent the island's huge problem of peat fires.

=== China’s Ruoergai marshes ===
Previous work in China has included the Ruoergai marshes, and new work is looking at the Yellow Sea/Bohai migratory bird flyway. Runoff from the glaciers in the Himalayas towards China’s lowland is regulated and stored in the Ruoergai marshes. The Wetlands International China office worked to have this peatland declared a Ramsar site, giving the Chinese government the obligation to protect the area. Furthermore, because of the work with the local Chinese authorities in measuring the impact of different management options, peat mining and drainage are now no longer allowed in Ruoergai and the neighbouring counties. This also leads to improved water supply to the Yellow River and Yangtze River.

=== Turberas of Tierra del Fuego, Argentina ===
In Tierra del Fuego, Argentina, the Wetlands International Latin America office built awareness of sustainable use of the peatlands from the local to the national level, which have contributed to their protection.

=== Coastal wetlands ===
Coastal wetlands such as mangrove forests and coral reefs reduce the impact of storms. Mangroves can even cope with sea level rise and provide protection from impacts of waves.

=== Dryland regions ===
In dryland regions such as sub-Saharan Africa, less rainfall and longer droughts increase the already huge importance of the Sahelian wetlands, and at the same time threaten overexploitation of these areas.

Wetlands International works in Mali to improve the livelihoods and water provision of communities in the Inner Niger Delta in a changing climate.

=== Biodiversity and waterbirds ===
Wetlands International works to protect and restore the rich biodiversity of wetlands. Millions of waterbirds depend on wetlands like marshes, lakes and coastal zones. Wetlands International coordinates an International Waterbird Census in most countries of the world outside the US where it approximates to the Christmas Bird Count run by the Audubon Society. The census takes place in 143 countries, divided into five regions, visiting 15,000 sites over 60 years.

==== Promoting the protecting of wetlands along the flyways of waterbirds ====
Wetlands International promotes the establishment of ecological networks of well managed, protected wetlands, along the main flyway routes of migratory waterbirds. These wetlands provide stepping stones for migratory waterbirds; crucial for their survival. Wetlands International supports international governmental agreements to create these networks.
