= Shengli Oil Field =

Oil field in China

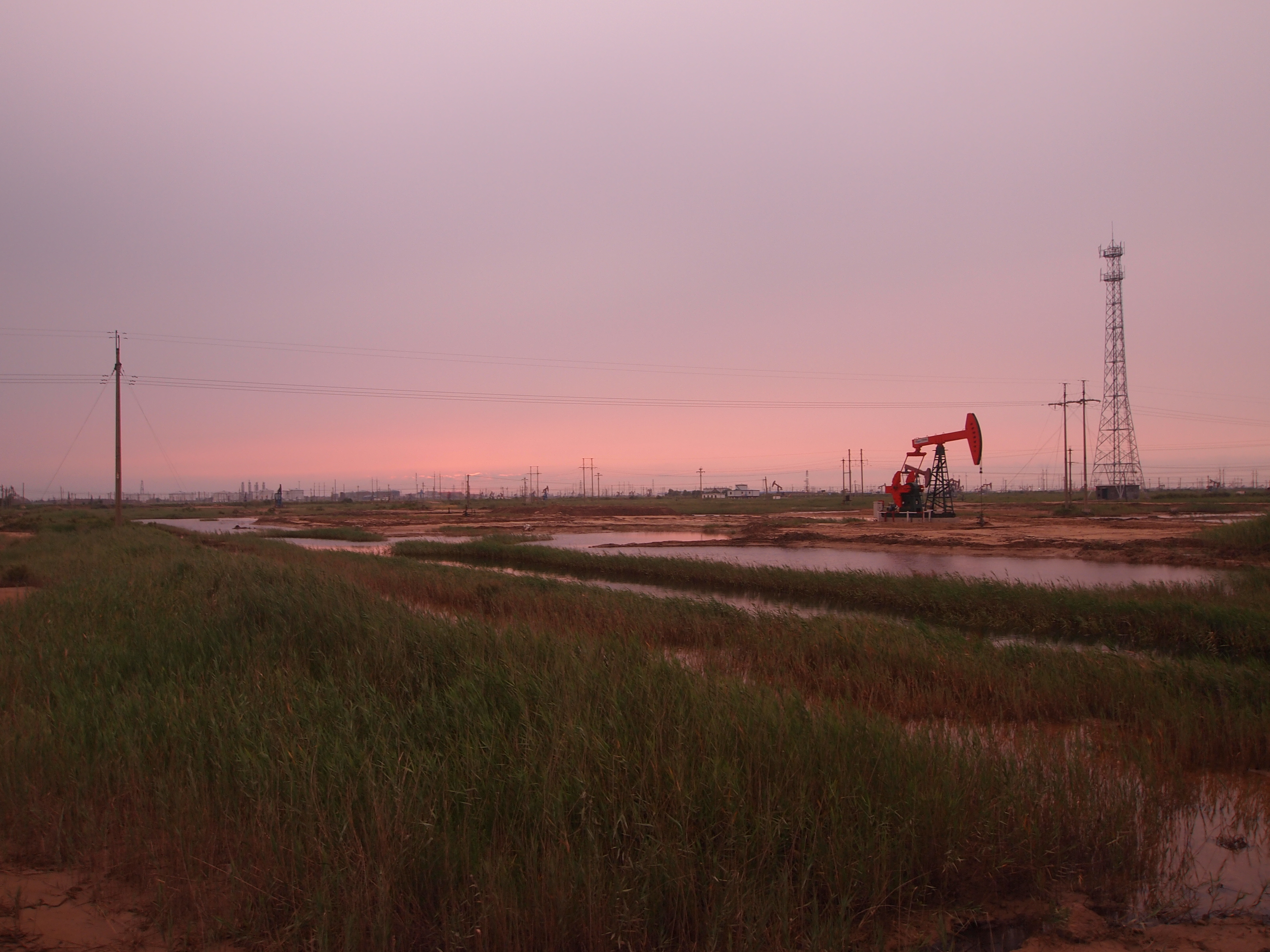
Shengli Oil Field in 2012

The Shengli Oil Field (simplified Chinese: 胜利油田; traditional Chinese: 勝利油田; pinyin: Shènglì Yóutián; lit. 'Victory Oil Field') is the second-largest oil field in China. Located in the delta of the Yellow River, it was discovered in 1961, and oil production began in earnest in 1964. Oil output quickly increased, peaking in 1991 at 33.55 million tons. While output has decreased since then, enhanced oil recovery techniques have maintained oil production at high levels, producing around 650,000 barrels (103,000 m^{3}) per day.

The Shengli Oil Field Company is a subsidiary of Sinopec. The oil field also produces natural gas, and activities have recently expanded into shale oil, solar power, and wind power. The development of the oil fields was an important contributor to the economy of the local area, playing a role in the establishment of the city of Dongying in 1983. The activities of the oil industry have damaged the local wetland areas, and contributed to local pollution.

== Location and conditions ==
The Shengli Oil Field lies within the delta where the Yellow River flows out into the Bohai Sea. The conditions in the delta are difficult, with shifting soils, high temperatures, and high salinity. The oil has a water cut that reaches above 95%, is highly viscous, as thin as 6 metres (20 ft), and 92% lies deeper than 1.2 kilometres (0.75 mi). Some reservoirs are as deep as 2.5 kilometres (1.6 mi). It is estimated that the field originally had 5.21 billion tons of oil, mostly onshore, but including some offshore reservoirs. The various reservoirs within the oil field have very different oil quality, although overall the oil has high levels of octane as opposed to gasoline.

== Management and impact ==
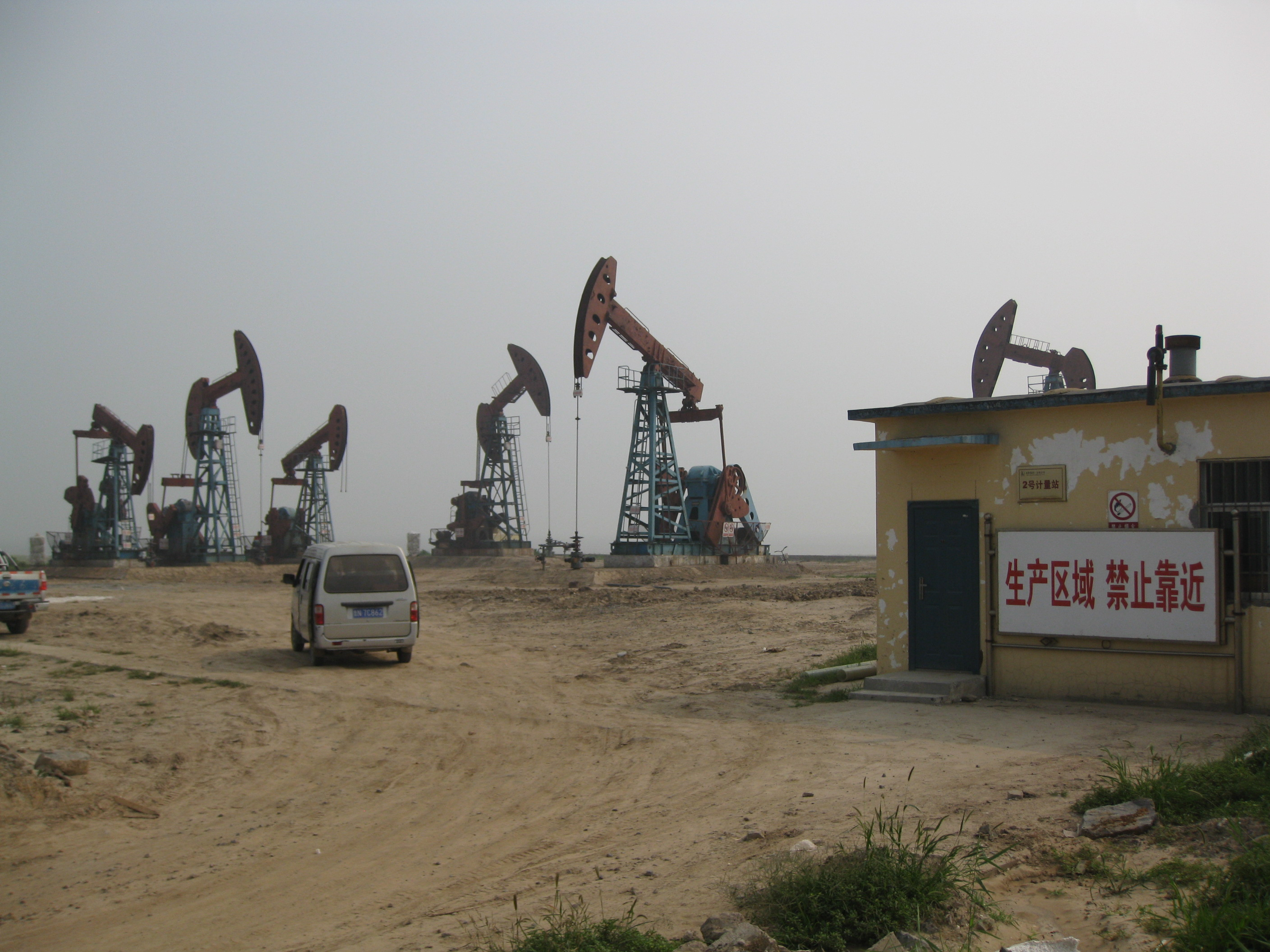
Oil wells in 2012

The Shengli Oil Field is the second largest oil field in China, after the Daqing Oil Field. it is also one of the oldest. The daily production of crude oil is approximately 650,000 barrels (103,000 m^{3}). Throughout its period of operation, it has produced a fifth of all the crude oil from China and half of all oil from the Bohai Sea.

The Shengli Oil Field Company, or Shengli Petroleum Administration Bureau, is a subsidiary of Sinopec. Most of the work carried out by the Shengli Oil Field Company takes place in the city of Dongying, although it also has operations in seven other prefecture level cities in Shandong Province, Binzhou, Dezhou, Jinan, Weifang, Zibo, Liaocheng, and Yantai, and a presence in 28 other counties in Shandong, and five other province-level divisions. The major production area lies on both sides of the mouth of the Yellow River. The most productive of these reservoirs are the Cenozoic Guantao and Shahejie formations.

The oil field has underpinned the economic development of the region. The growth of the oil industry around the Yellow River delta led to the creation of the city of Dongying on 1 October 1983. Gudao Town was established in November 1992 to cover a settlement that had developed around the Gudao Oil Extraction Factory. Xianhe Town is also built around the oil industry. Multiple oil production plants have been established, each covering a large number of oil reservoirs. The Shengli Oil Field is an important component of the wider CNOOC Bohai Oilfield.

The oil industry produces significant amounts of pollution. In the 1990s, it produced around 40% of the overall pollution in Dongying. Oil wells and associated infrastructure, such as roads, disturb the wetland habitat of local wildlife. Many bird habitats were kept outside of core wildlife protection areas in order to facilitate continued oil production.

== History ==
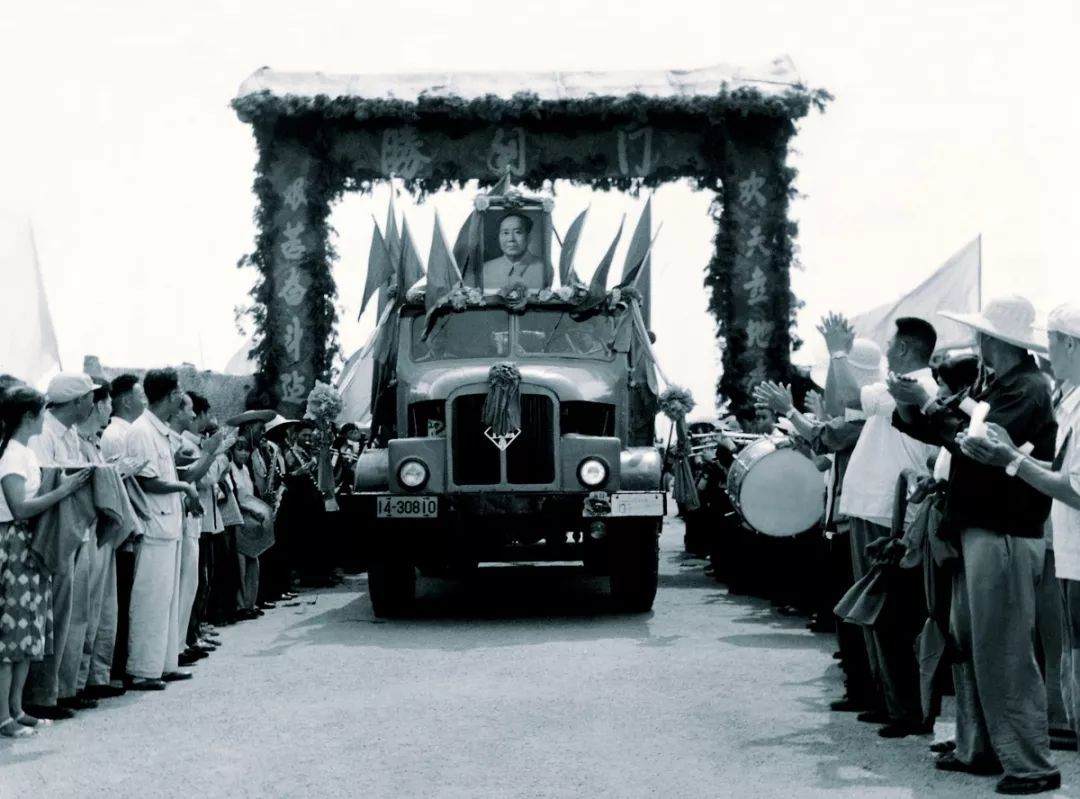
On 7 December 1963, the first truck loaded with oil left the "Victory Gate" of Shengli Oilfield.

The Shengli Oil Field was discovered on 16 April 1961 when the Hua 8 well was drilled. Large-scale extraction began on 25 January 1964. Crude oil production started in 1964, and the initial output in 1965 was 700,000 tons. Output had increased to 10.8 million tons by 1973, and exceeded 11 million in 1974. 1974 also saw the completion of a pipeline to transport oil directly to ports near Qingdao.

In 1978 oil output reached 19.46 million tons, the second highest amount in China. Output continued to increase, expanding 10% per year in the early 1980s. In 1983 it passed 24 million tons, and by 1986 it passed 30 million. Production was stable in the late 1980s. Exploration uncovered new reservoirs in 1987 and 1988.

The Yellow River Delta National Nature Reserve that were created in Dongying in the 1990s had its management borders defined to minimize overlap with facilities used to exploit the Shengli Oil Field. Nonetheless, 515 oil wells producing 4.5% of output at the time were located in the area designated as a reserve, leading to coordination between the Shengli Oil Field Company and the Yellow River Delta National Nature Reserve Administrative Bureau for the management of these areas.

Output peaked at 33.55 million tons in 1991. Exploitation of offshore reservoirs on the continental shelf of the Bohai Sea increased in the 1990s, from 10,000 barrels per day in 1993 to 50,000 in 1996. The offshore Chengdao oil field was China's largest shallow sea oil reservoir. By 1994, 65 reservoirs had been developed. In 1995 1,672 wells were drilled, of which 166 were exploratory and 1,506 were developed, creating an overall total of 14,367 oil wells, 5,518 water injection wells, and 274 gas wells. Overall production declined until 1999, reaching a minimum of 26.6 million tons. After this point production stabilised at that level and even began to rise again, reaching 27.9 million tons in 2009. By 2009, most of the oil reservoirs had been at least partially depleted.

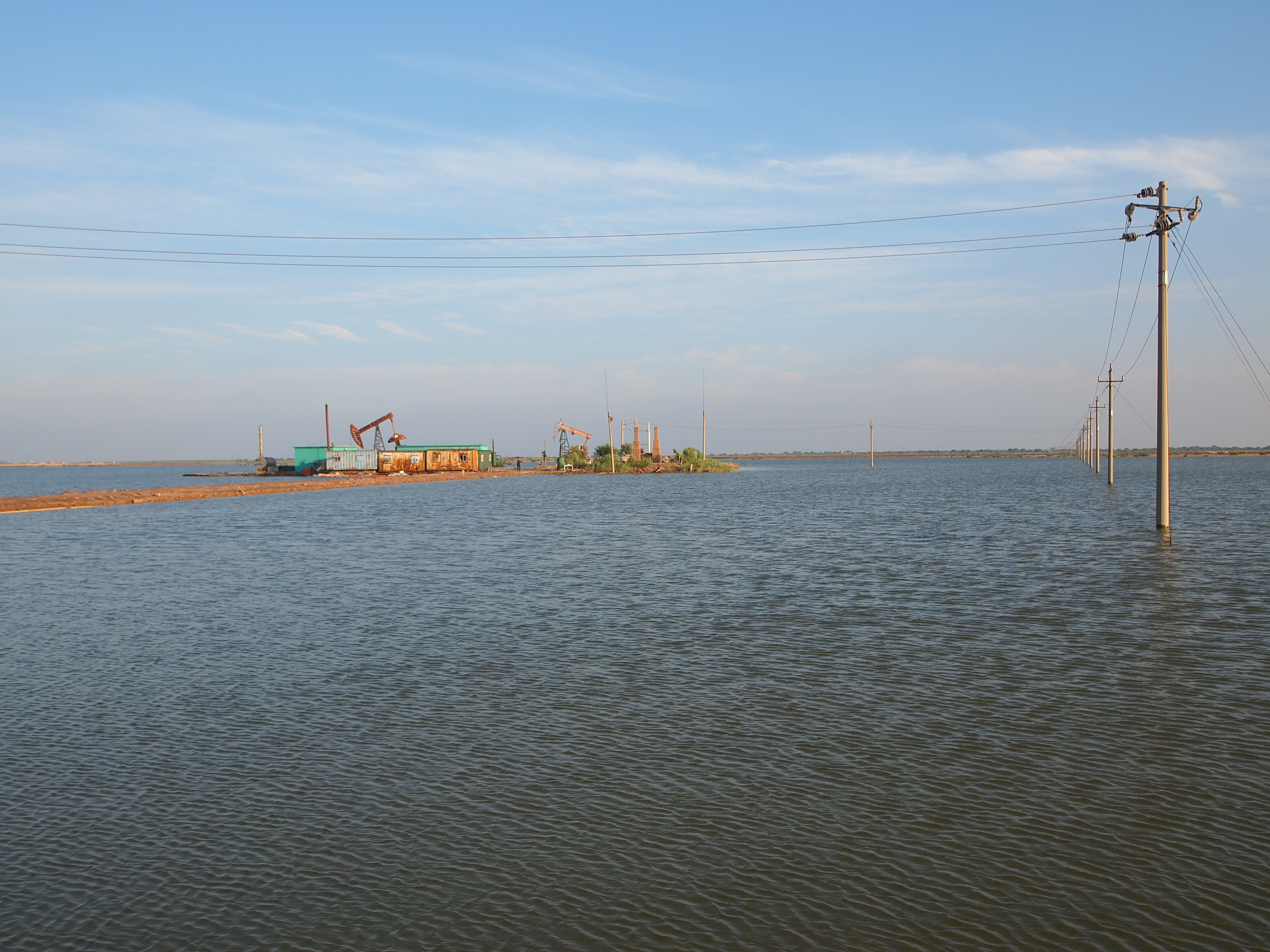
Oil wells in shallow water

Output of natural gas averaged 1.2 billion cubic metres (42×10^{9} cu ft) from 1975 to 1998, peaking in 1989 with 1.5 billion cubic metres (53×10^{9} cu ft). The decline since then was slightly arrested in the 21st century, and was 770 million cubic metres (27×10^{9} cu ft) in 2008. Output of oil was 27.34 million tons in 2011 and 2012, and the field also produced 500 cubic metres (18,000 cu ft) of natural gas.

In 2013, Shengli Oilfield grasped the two major oil and gas exploration blocks in the east and the west, focusing on "fine exploration to stabilize the foundation in the east and innovative breakthroughs to accelerate the development in the west", highlighting oil and gas discoveries and commercial discoveries, optimizing the exploration, deployment, and strengthening the economic evaluation. As of December 31, 2013, Shengli Oil Field fully completed the production and operation tasks in 2013, adding 81.75 million tons of new controlled reserves and 91.28 million tons of forecasted reserves for the year, and producing 27.762 million tons of crude oil.

== Enhanced oil recovery and carbon capture ==
Research into enhanced oil recovery (EOR) has taken place as output was expected to decline. Chemical EOR methods were first trialled in 1991, and by the 2010s chemical EOR was producing 3 million tons each year. Thermal methods of EOR are also used. The percentage of overall production from EOR rose from 8.9% in 1995 to 29.3% in 2011, ensuring overall production dropped only slightly. New kinds of chemical EOR have been tested since 1991, although only some have made it to being properly used in the field. The efficiency of EOR measures has decreased over time as more oil has been extracted. Overall output is expected to continue to decline.

The use of carbon dioxide injection methods for EOR allows for the EOR process to also be used for carbon capture and storage (CCS). The most depleted oil reservoirs were the ones near Dongying, and thus near power plants producing carbon dioxide emissions. A pilot project, the Sinopec Qilu Petrochemical CCS Project, launched in 2007 to store 40,000 tons of coal-produced carbon dioxide per year. This carbon dioxide is piped as far as 80 kilometres (50 mi) to reach the oil field, where it is deposited 3 kilometres (1.9 mi) underground. A post-combustion capture plant was built in September 2010, with the capacity to process 110 tons per day (3,500 per year). This carbon dioxide is used for EOR activities, and can increase oil production by 10%-15%. Capacity was later scaled up to 40,000 tons per year, with plans to reach 1 million tons per year. A new plant to carry this out was completed in 2022, and plans were put in place to build a second by 2025. This is intended by Sinopec to contribute to China's net-zero by 2060 plans.

== Other industries ==
The Shengli Oil Field Company has expanded its economic interests into other industries, often linked with oil, such as chemical industries, machine-building, and electronics. They have also diversified their sources of energy. Shale oil was discovered in 2021. Production reached 171 tons daily in the Fanye-1 Well on 3 November, the highest output of a shale oil well in China. A Shale Oil National Demonstration Zone has been established in the oil field.

The area has also seen investment in solar and wind power, through projects such as the Bozhong Offshore Wind Power Project. Combined, as of 2024 both produced more energy for Dongying than thermal power. The offshore areas have wind speed averages of around 7.6 metres per second (25 ft/s) at 100 metres (330 ft) above the sea surface, and receive 5,253 MJ/m^{2} of radiation energy from the sun.
