= East Asian–Australasian Flyway =

Major migratory bird flight path over the Indo-Pacific

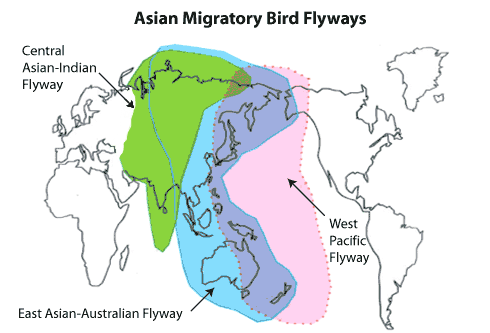
Central Asian, East Asian–Australasian, and West Pacific migratory bird flyways

The East Asian–Australasian Flyway is one of the world's great flyways of migratory birds. At its northernmost it stretches eastwards from the Taimyr Peninsula in Russia to Alaska. Its southern end encompasses Australia and New Zealand. Between these extremes the flyway covers much of eastern Asia, including China, Japan, Korea, South-East Asia and the western Pacific. The EAAF is home to over 50 million migratory water birds from over 250 different populations, including 32 globally threatened species and 19 near threatened species. It is especially important for the millions of migratory waders or shorebirds that breed in northern Asia and Alaska and spend the non-breeding season in South-East Asia and Australasia.

== Flyway Site Network ==
During migration, water birds rely on a system of highly productive wetlands to rest and feed, building up sufficient energy to fuel the next phase of their journey. International cooperation across their migratory range is therefore essential to conserve and protect migratory water birds and the habitats on which they depend. East Asian-Australasian Flyway Partnership (EAAFP) identified 1060 sites as internationally important for migratory birds. These sites are called the Flyway Site Network. The sites are expected to collaborate with the local community to preserve the wetland by raising awareness regarding the importance of the site, carefully documenting the number of migratory bird populations, and strictly monitoring the vegetation condition within the site.

An important site in Alaska is the small Lake Teshekpuk, which covers just 18 percent of the National Petroleum Reserve-Alaska, but hosts more than 40 percent of all aquatic birds visiting the Alaska North Slope.

== Threats ==
=== Habitat loss and degradation ===
The degradation of forests in South-East Asia is prominent due to large-scale logging, which affects the habitats of many songbirds that breed in forests. Several songbirds, such as the Streaked Reed Warbler and the Black-Throated Robin, have been listed as either vulnerable or endangered. Coastal marshes, freshwater, and flooded grasslands are important food sources for songbirds like the family of Locustellidae, but many of these natural habitats are either converted to agricultural land or threatened by drainage. In response to the damage of wetlands and forests, many countries have implemented new forestry policies. An example of this is China's Natural Forest Protection Plan, which is expected to increase forest cover in eastern and southern China.

Land reclamation of the coastal mudflats of the Yellow Sea (with over 65% of mudflats lost) has led to major population declines in migratory waders.

=== Hunting ===
Another major threat is rampant hunting in South-East Asia. Reasons for hunting vary, but pet trade and hunting for food in rural areas are the most common motives. As a result of unregulated hunting, the Yellow-breasted Bunting's IUCN threat status changed from "Least Concern" in 2000 to "Critically Endangered" in 2017. In parts of Cambodia and Thailand, migratory songbirds including swallows and Great Reed Warblers are caught for religious "mercy releases", resulting in thousands of deaths.

== Conservation Priorities ==
According to a holistic review of current research, the demographics, habitat distribution, and survival rate of many endangered species remain ambiguous. Studies about these areas in the key habitats along the flyway may prove useful to conservation of migratory birds. Besides, the current Flyway Site Network mainly focuses on water birds, neglecting the protection of remained migratory birds. Scientists claim that organizations and laws focusing on protecting these birds may be needed.

== Roles of birders ==
The birding community in Asia is increasing rapidly, especially in China, Thailand, Indonesia, and Philippines, due to a growing middle class. Despite language barriers, the e-bird system has successfully assisted birding communication across national boundaries, contributing to the development of EAAF. For example, the collective data from birders have contributed to many research projects, such as filling the gap of distribution of the rufous-headed robin in Cambodia.

== See also ==
- China–Australia Migratory Bird Agreement
- Japan–Australia Migratory Bird Agreement
- Republic of Korea–Australia Migratory Bird Agreement
- Saemangeum South Korea
- Saemangeum Seawall South Korea
- Bonn Convention
- Ramsar Convention
