= Mahul Creek =

Creek in Mumbai, India

Coordinates: 19°00′N 72°52′E

Mahul Creek is a tidal creek in north west Mumbai. It opens into the Thane Creek. The creek is located near the neighbourhoods of Chembur and Mahul. It is surrounded by mangrove forests.

When measured from the high tide line of one bank to another, the creek is over 350 metres (1,148 ft) wide. It also serves as a discharge for excess rainwater in eastern suburban Mumbai.

Usually, from November to January, the Sewri-Mahul creek becomes home to thousands of flamingos from Kutch, Gujarat.

There is also an old Portuguese fort overlooking the Mahul creek.
