= Kattampally =

Village in Kollam District, Kerala, India

Coordinates: 11.9440282°N 75.3759956°E

Kattampally is a village located in the eastern part of Kannur district, Kerala on the Valapattanam River. The nearest towns are Puthiyatheru and Kambil.

Kattampally GMUP School and syndicate Bank are the major institutions in the locality. The river has facilities for fishing and kayaking. The postal code of Kattampally is 670011.

== Places of worship ==
The village has six temples: Athishayamangalam Temple, Chavarukavu, Moolabounder Temple, Arthanareeswara Temple, Arathakandappan Temple, Chattara Devi Temple and Arthanariswara Temple.

== Visitor attractions ==
Kanyarkayam waterfall is located in Moonnattumuku.
