= West Pacific Flyway =

Bird migration route

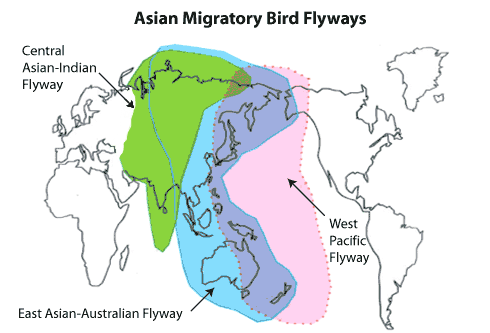
Central Asian, East Asian-Australasian, and West Pacific migratory bird flyways

The West Pacific Flyway is a bird migration route that stretches from New Zealand and the east coast of Australia, northwards through the central Pacific Ocean, including Papua New Guinea, eastern Indonesia and the Philippines, the east coast of northern Asia, including Japan and the Korean Peninsula, and ending at the Bering and Chukchi Seas encompassing easternmost Siberia (including the Chukotka and Kamchatka Peninsulas) and the Alaskan Peninsula.

It overlaps along its western margin with the East Asian - Australasian Flyway, and at its north eastern extremity with the Central Asian Flyway in the vicinity of Wrangel and Herald Islands.

The West Pacific Flyway covers a large number of Pacific islands including the American Samoa, the Cook Islands, Fiji, French Polynesia, Guam, Hawaii, Kiribati, the Marshall Islands, Micronesia, Nauru, New Caledonia, Niue, the Northern Mariana Islands, Palau, the Pitcairn Islands, the Solomon Islands, Tokelau, Tonga, Tuvalu, Vanuatu, the Wallis and Futuna Islands and Western Samoa.
