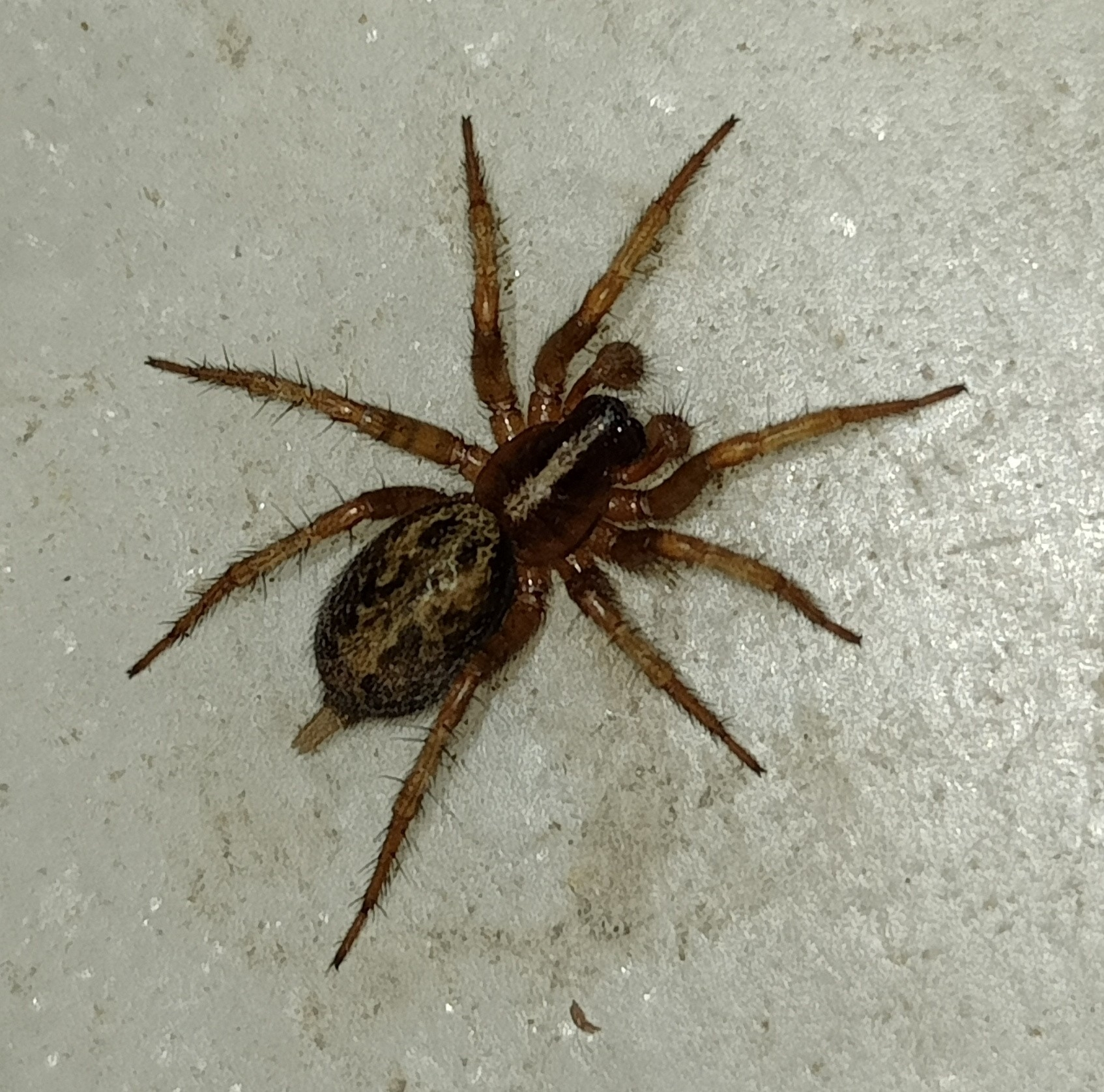
- Maimuna vestita male

Scientific classification
- Kingdom: Animalia
- Phylum: Arthropoda
- Subphylum: Chelicerata
- Class: Arachnida
- Order: Araneae
- Infraorder: Araneomorphae
- Family: Agelenidae
- Subfamily: Ageleninae
- Genus: Maimuna; Lehtinen, 1967

Type species
- Textrix vestita C. L. Koch, 1841

= Maimuna (spider) =

Genus of spiders

Maimuna is a Western Palaearctic genus of medium-sized spiders in the family Agelenidae, members of which are commonly known as funnel weavers. The genus is distributed in the Mediterranean and Black Sea regions, with records from southern and eastern Europe, Anatolia, and the Levant. Nine species are currently accepted in the genus.

== Taxonomy ==
Maimuna was described by Pekka T. Lehtinen in 1967, with Textrix vestita C. L. Koch, 1841 as its type species. The generic name is apparently an arbitrary combination of letters.

Several species now placed in Maimuna were originally described in Textrix. The original description of the genus summarised its diagnostic characters in a table rather than in a separate prose diagnosis. The genus has since been revised or reviewed in regional studies of the fauna of Israel and Turkey.

Maimuna deserticola, formerly included in the genus, is now placed in Afrotrix, while Maimuna libanica is treated as a synonym of Maimuna bovierlapierrei.

== Description ==
Species of Maimuna resemble related agelenid spiders in general body form and eye arrangement. The posterior median eyes are larger than the anterior lateral eyes, while the other eye pairs are smaller and approximately equal in size. The clypeus is high, and the chelicerae have three promarginal and two retromarginal teeth.

The genus is distinguished especially by characters of the male palp. The male palpal femur is distally concave on one side and has a step-like prominence on the other side. The patella is smooth, the tibia is only slightly furrowed ventrally, and the embolus is fine and filamentous. The modified male palpal femur and the form of the elaborate palpal sclerites are regarded as the main characters separating Maimuna from related genera. Females are less consistently separable from related genera, but the epigynal plate has a large central depression, bordered anteriorly and with raised lateral hoods.

== Species and distribution ==
The genus extends from the Balkans to Crimea and southwards to Israel. Turkey is one of the better documented parts of the range, and two new species, Maimuna anatolica from Muğla Province and Maimuna antalyensis from Antalya Province, were described after the Turkish species were reviewed.

The following species are accepted in the genus:

Scientific name	Distribution
Maimuna anatolica Dimitrov, 2022	Turkey
Maimuna antalyensis Zamani, Kaya & Marusik, 2024	Turkey
Maimuna bovierlapierrei (Kulczyński, 1911)	Lebanon and Israel
Maimuna cariae Brignoli, 1978	Turkey
Maimuna carmelica Levy, 1996	Israel
Maimuna cretica (Kulczyński, 1903)	Greece, including Crete
Maimuna inornata (O. Pickard-Cambridge, 1872)	Greece, Syria and Israel
Maimuna meronis Levy, 1996	Israel
Maimuna vestita (C. L. Koch, 1841)	Italy, Croatia, Romania, Ukraine, Albania, North Macedonia, Bulgaria, Greece, and Turkey

== Ecology ==
Published ecological information on the genus primarily concerns Maimuna vestita.
