= Voous =

Voous could refer to:

- Dutch ornithologist, Karel Voous
- the "List of Recent Holarctic Bird Species", of which he was the author
