= Spotted creeper =

Spotted creeper could refer to one of two species of bird:

- Indian spotted creeper, Salpornis spilonotus
- African spotted creeper, Salpornis salvadori
