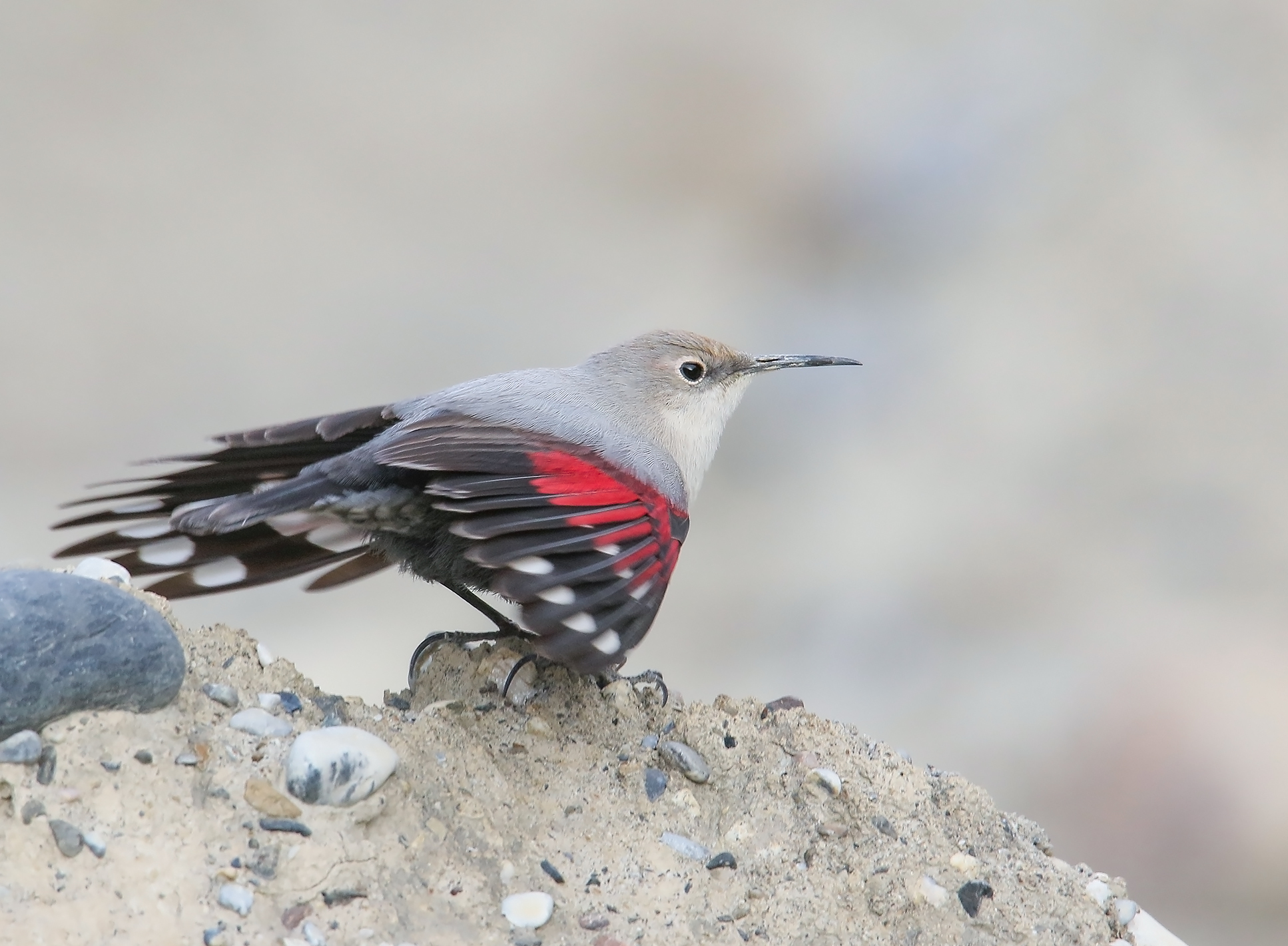

Conservation status
- Least Concern (IUCN 3.1)

Scientific classification
- Kingdom: Animalia
- Phylum: Chordata
- Class: Aves
- Order: Passeriformes
- Family: Tichodromidae
- Genus: Tichodroma
- Species: T. muraria

Binomial name
- Tichodroma muraria (Linnaeus, 1766)
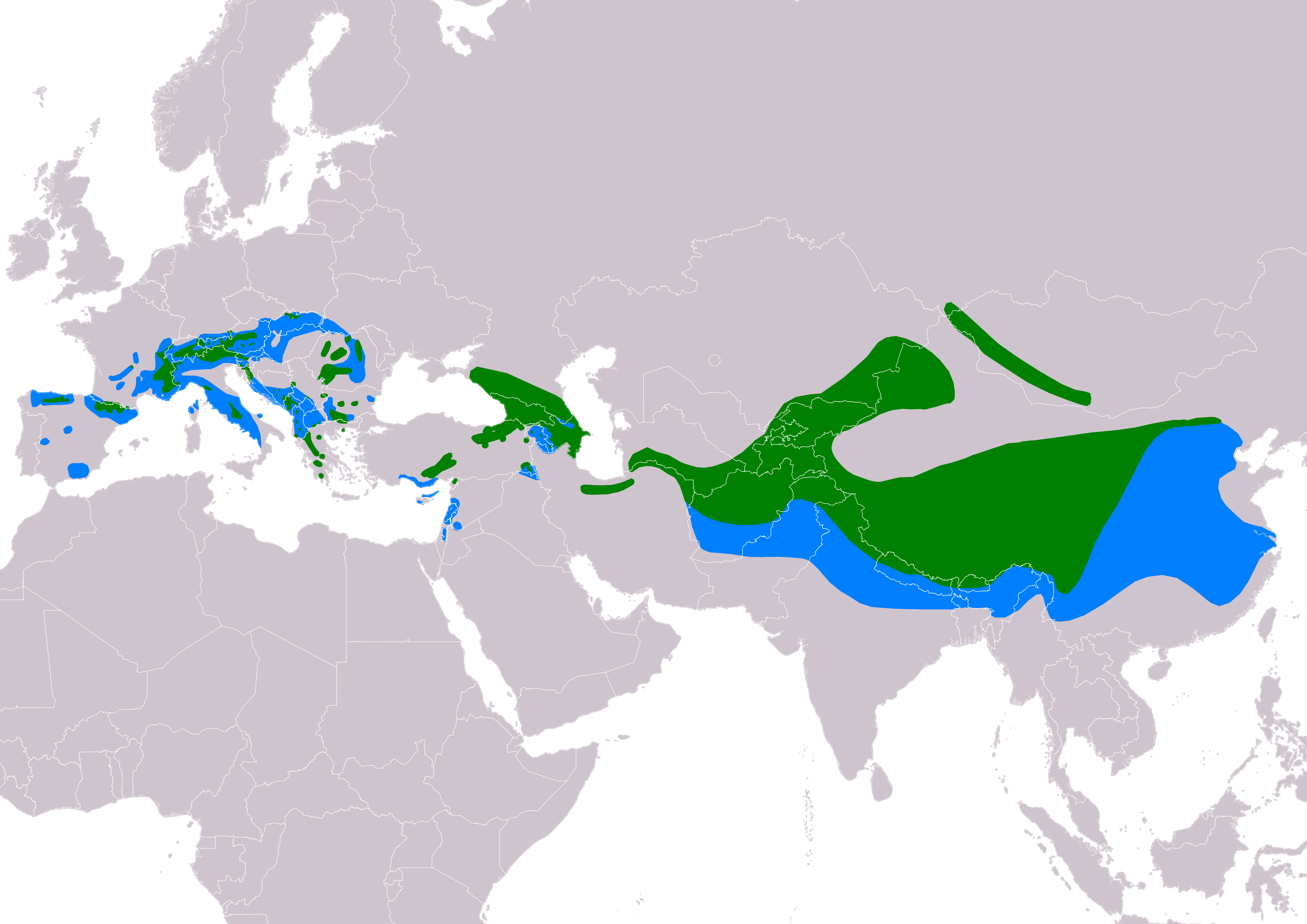
- Range of T. muraria (Compiled by: BirdLife International and Handbook of the Birds of the World (2019) 2019.) Resident Non-breeding

Synonyms
- Certhia muraria Linnaeus, 1766

= Wallcreeper =

Species of bird

The wallcreeper (Tichodroma muraria) is a small passerine bird found throughout the high mountains of the Palearctic from southern Europe to central China. It is the only extant member of both the genus Tichodroma and the family Tichodromidae.

== Taxonomy and systematics ==
In the past, there was some disagreement among ornithologists as to where the wallcreeper belongs in the taxonomic order. Initially, Linnaeus included it in the treecreepers as Certhia muraria, and even when given a separate genus of its own, Tichodroma, by Johann Karl Wilhelm Illiger in 1811, it was long included in the treecreeper family Certhiidae. More recently, it was placed in its own monotypic family, Tichodromadidae, by Karel Voous in the influential List of Recent Holarctic Bird Species, while other authorities such as Charles Vaurie put it in a monotypic family called Tichodromadinae, as a subfamily of the nuthatch family Sittidae. In either case, it is closely related to the nuthatches; a 2016 phylogenetic study of members in the superfamily Certhioidea suggests it is a sister species to the Sittidae. At least one other species of wallcreeper is known from the fossil record, Tichodroma capeki (Late Miocene of Polgárdi, Hungary).

- Certhioidea
  - Tichodromidae: wallcreeper – 1 species
  - - Sittidae: nuthatches – 29 species
    - - - Salpornithidae: spotted creepers – 2 species
        - Certhiidae: treecreepers – 9 species
      - - Polioptilidae: gnatcatchers – 20 species
        - Troglodytidae: wrens – 96 species

Relationships among families in the superfamily Certhioidea.

The genus name Tichodroma comes from the Ancient Greek teikhos, meaning "wall", and dromos, meaning "runner". The specific name muraria is Medieval Latin for "of walls", from Latin murus, "wall". Alternatively, the wallcreeper is named the red-winged wall creeper.

=== Subspecies ===
Two subspecies are accepted:

- European wallcreeper (T. m. muraria) - (Linnaeus, 1766): Found from southern and eastern Europe to the Caucasus and western Iran
- Asian wallcreeper (T. m. nepalensis) - Bonaparte, 1850: Originally described as a separate species. Found from Kazakhstan, Turkmenistan and eastern Iran to eastern China

== Description ==
The wallcreeper is 15.5–17 centimetres (6.1–6.7 in) long, with a weight of 17–19 grams (0.60–0.67 oz). Its plumage is primarily blue-grey, with darker flight and tail feathers. In summer, the males have a black throat grading into the grey of the rest of the body, and females can have either a white throat or a small dark patch on the throat; in autumn and winter, both sexes have a white throat. Its most striking plumage feature, though, are its extraordinary crimson wings with white spots. Largely hidden when the wings are folded, this bright colouring covers most of the covert feathers, and the basal half of the primaries and secondaries. The tail is short, black with a narrow white fringe. Juveniles closely resemble the winter plumage. The subspecies T. m. nepalensis is slightly darker than the nominate race.

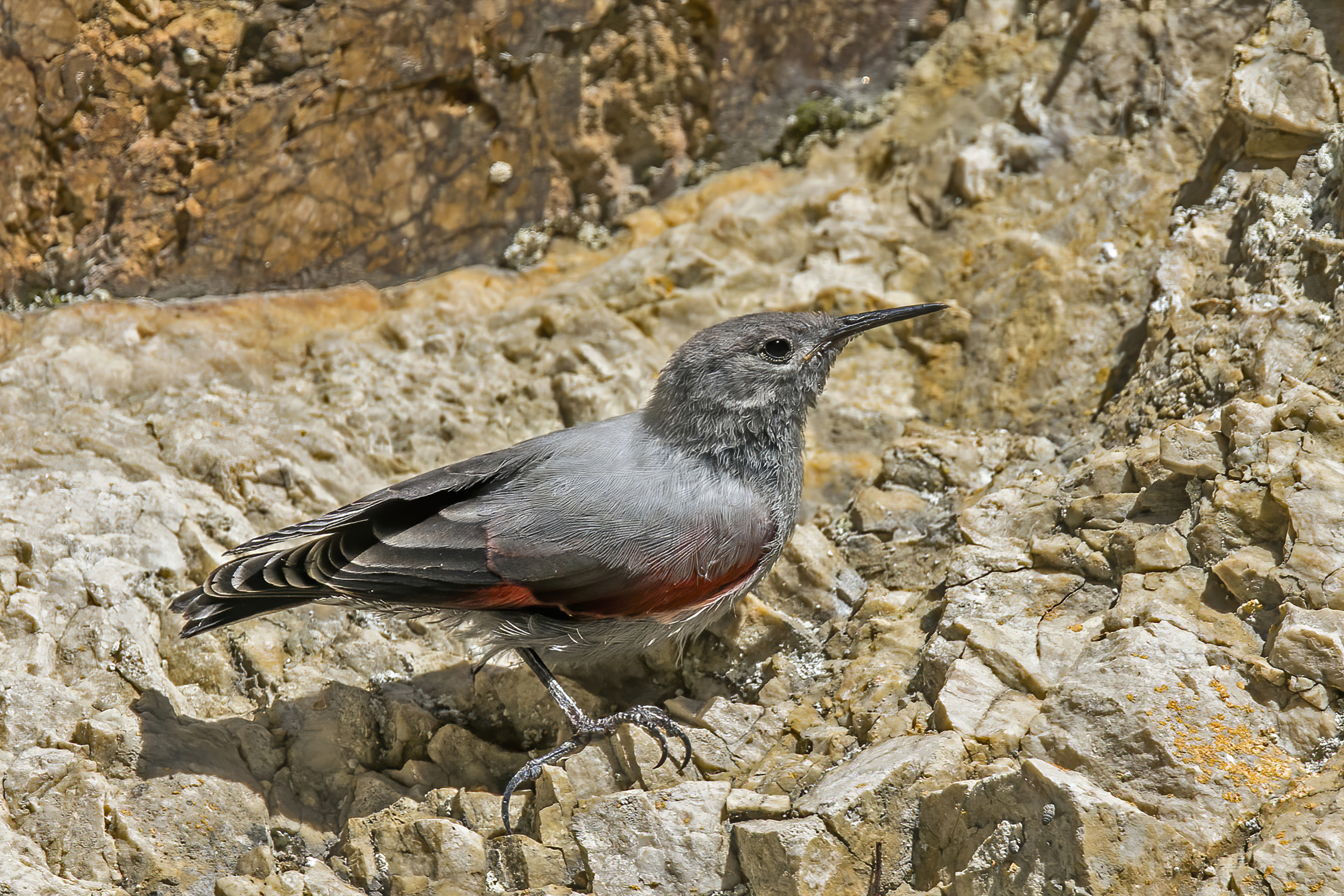
Typical position at rest

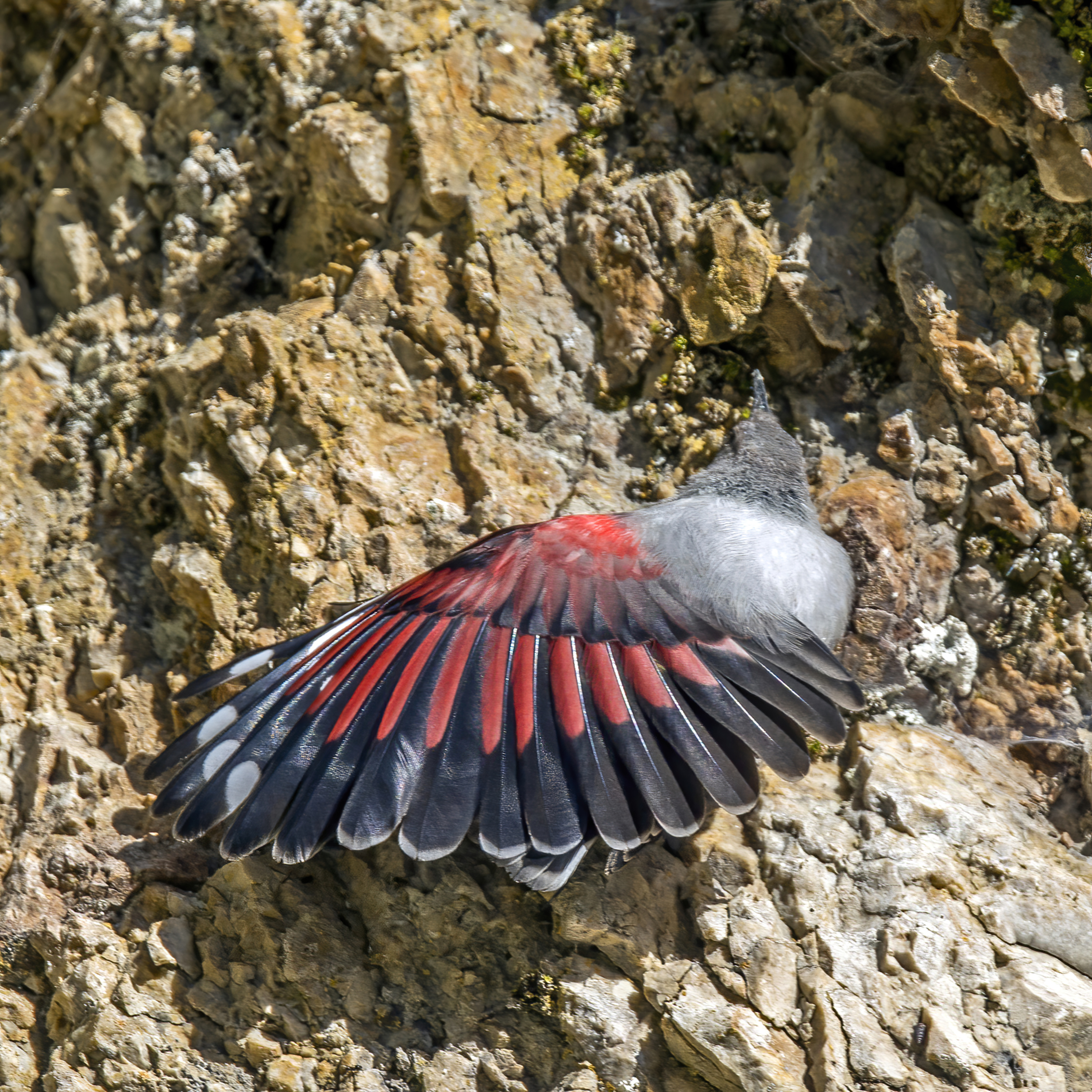
Showing wing colour

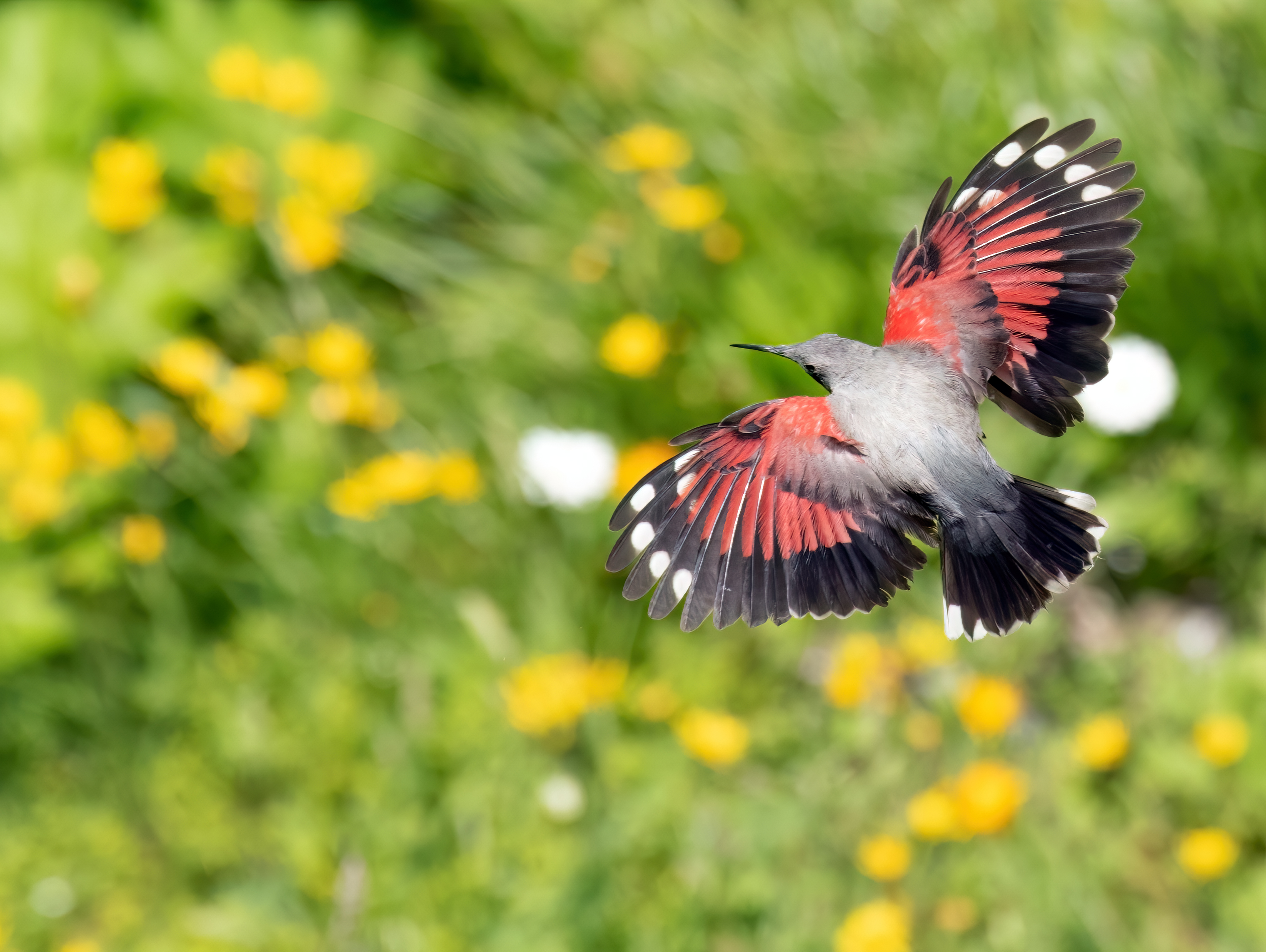
In flight, showing the startling wing pattern

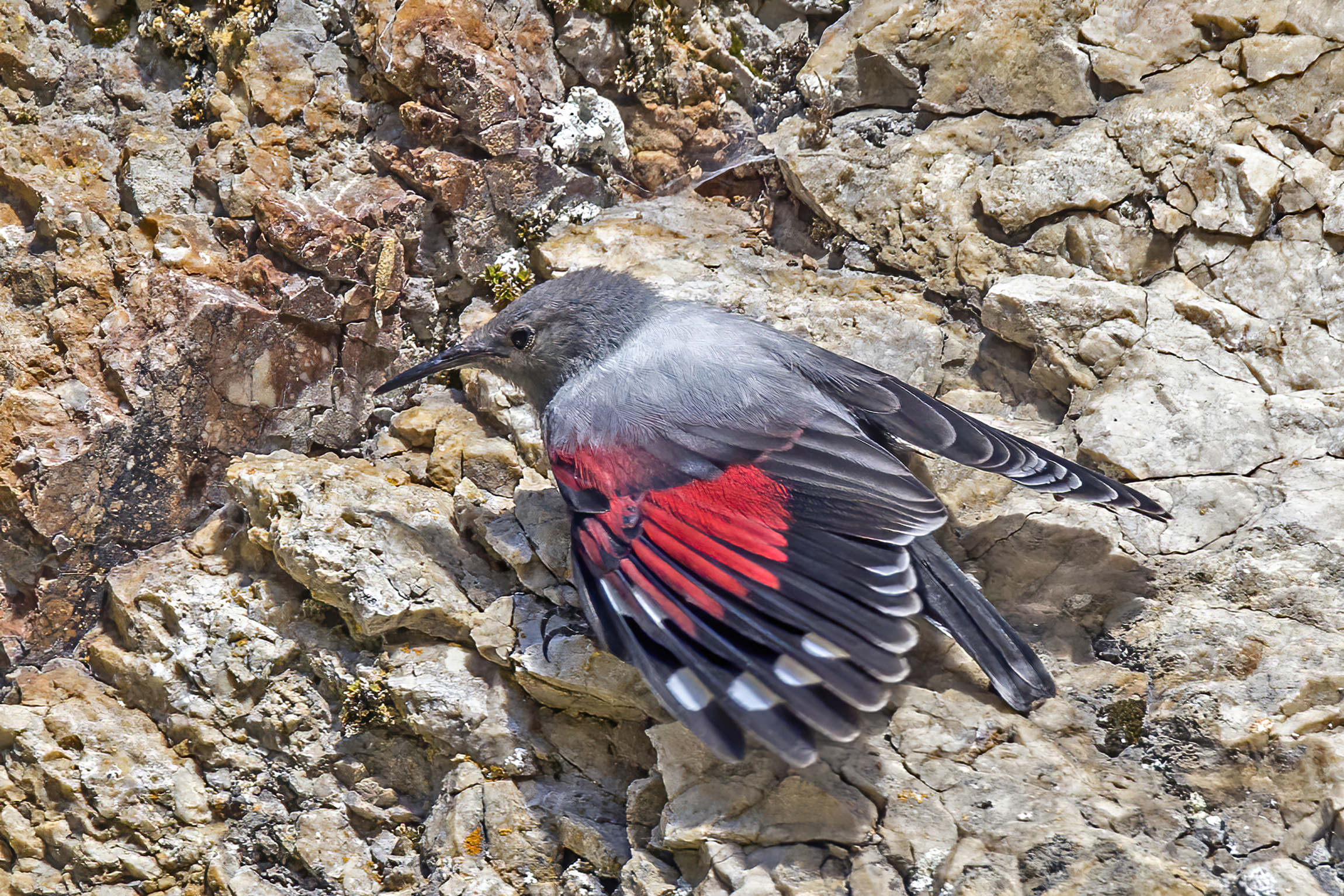
Female in the Piatra Craiului Mountains, Transylvania, Romania

=== Vocalisations ===
Though largely silent, both male and female wallcreepers sing, the females generally only while defending feeding territories in the winter. The song is a high-pitched, drawn-out whistle, with notes that alternately rise and fall. During the breeding season, the male sings while perched or climbing.

== Distribution and habitat ==
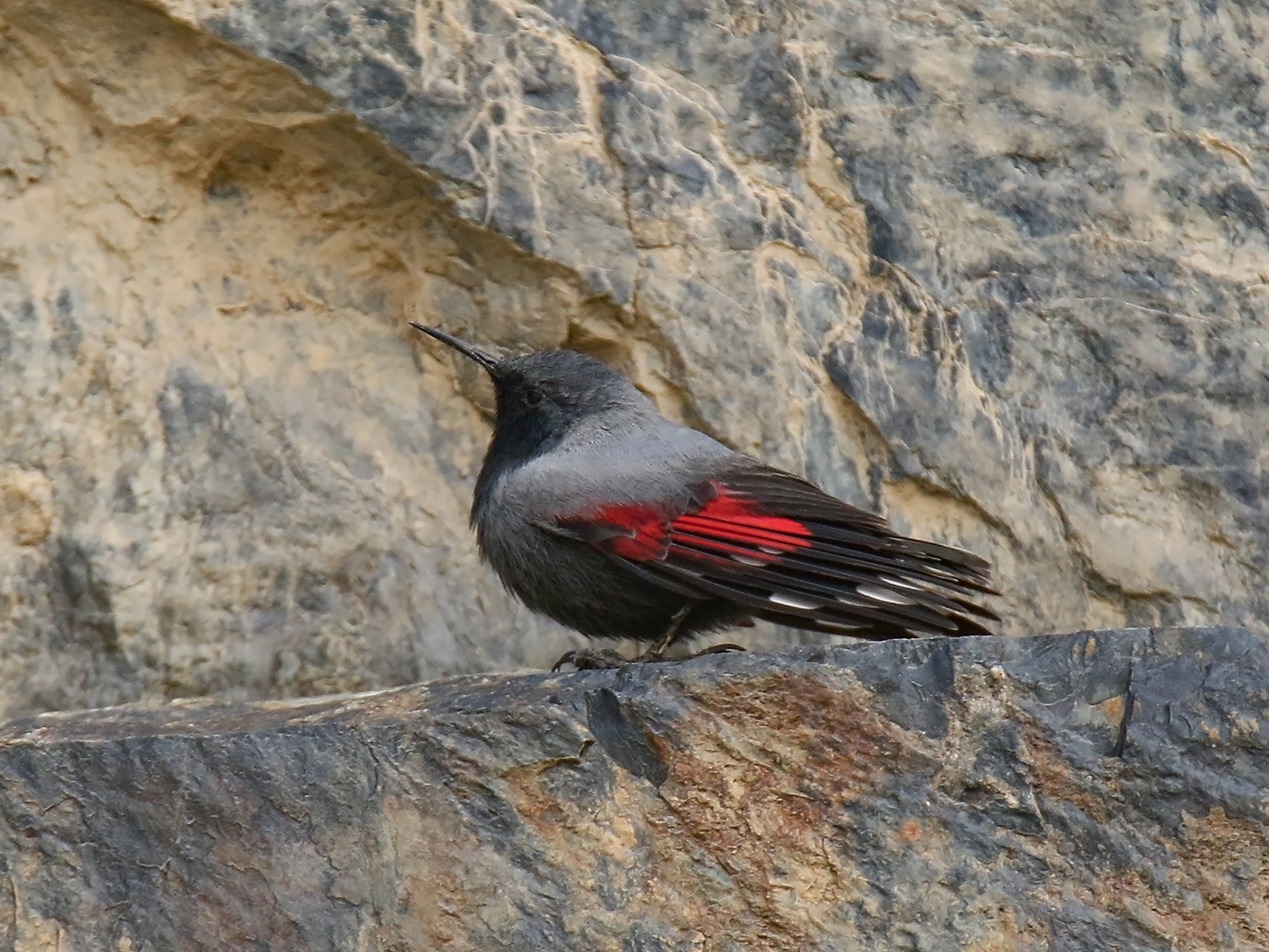
T. m. nepalensis, at Gojal, Gilgit-Baltistan, Pakistan

A bird of high mountains, the wallcreeper breeds at elevations ranging between 1,000 and 3,000 metres (3,300 and 9,800 ft) in Europe, between 2,800 and 4,000 metres (9,200 and 13,100 ft) in the Tien Shan, and 3,600 and 5,100 metres (11,800 and 16,700 ft) in the Himalaya. It is largely resident across its range, but moves to lower elevations in winter, when it is found on buildings and in quarries. In France it regularly and repeatedly winters on cathedrals and viaducts in Brittany and Normandy. Birds have wintered as far afield as England and the Netherlands, where one spent two consecutive winters between 1989 and 1991 at the Vrije Universiteit in Amsterdam. The species is resident across much of the Himalayas, ranging across India, Nepal, Bhutan and parts of Tibet and also as a winter visitor in Bangladesh. It's endemic to Eurasian mountains.

== Behaviour and ecology ==
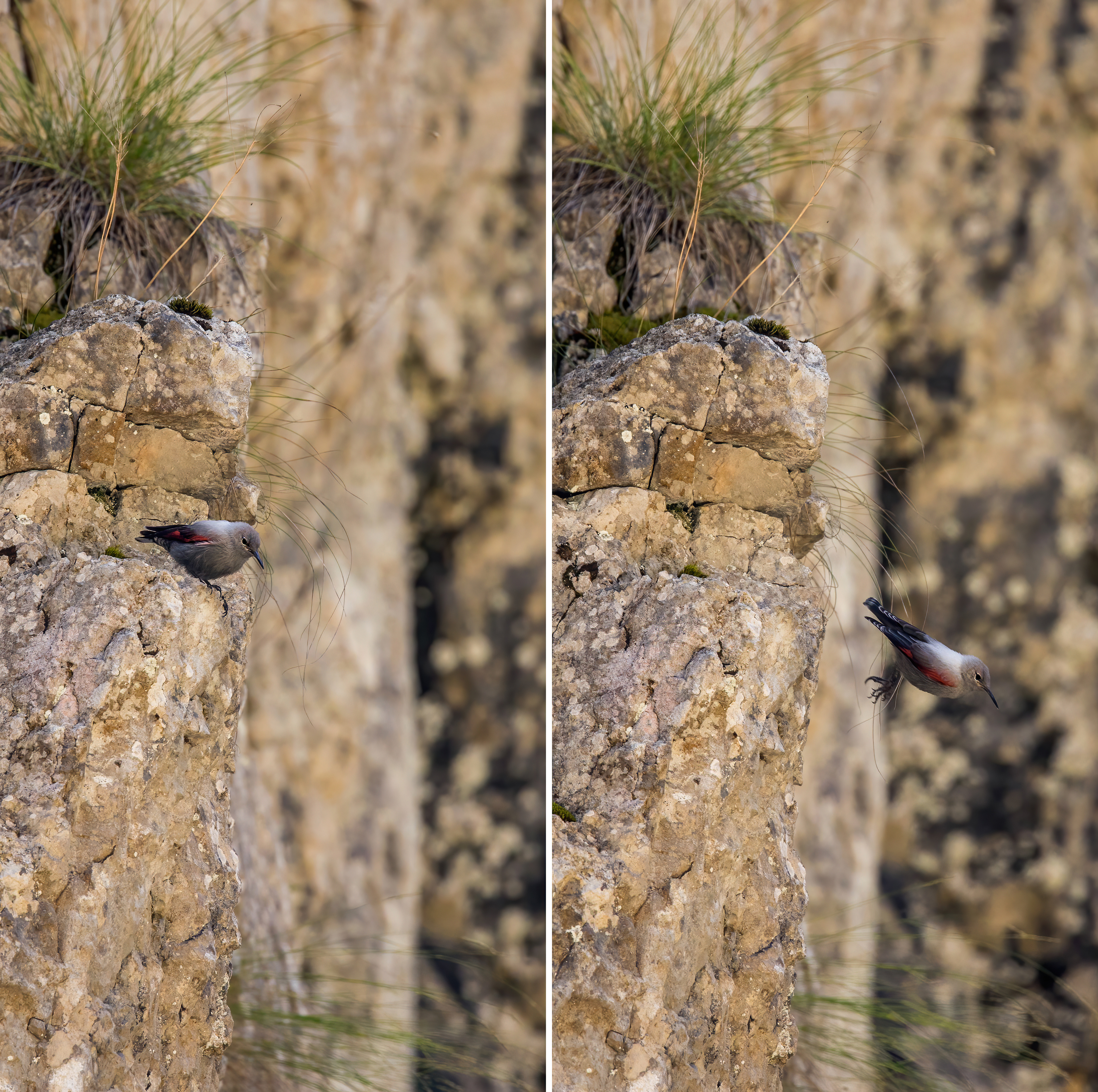
Dropping off a cliff edge

This species can be quite tame, but is often surprisingly difficult to see on mountain faces. While it may be confiding in the breeding and non-breeding seasons, and vagrant birds especially are extremely tame, they will still hide when they are aware of being watched, and will hesitate before entering the nest and even take roundabout routes towards the nest during prolonged observations.

Wallcreepers are territorial, and pairs vigorously defend their breeding territory during the summer. During the winter the wallcreeper is solitary, with males and females defending individual feeding territories. The size of these feeding territories is hard to estimate but may comprise a single large quarry or rock massif; or, alternatively, a series of smaller quarries and rock faces. Wallcreepers may travel some distances from roosting sites to feeding territories. They have also been demonstrated showing site fidelity to winter feeding territories in consecutive years.

=== Breeding ===
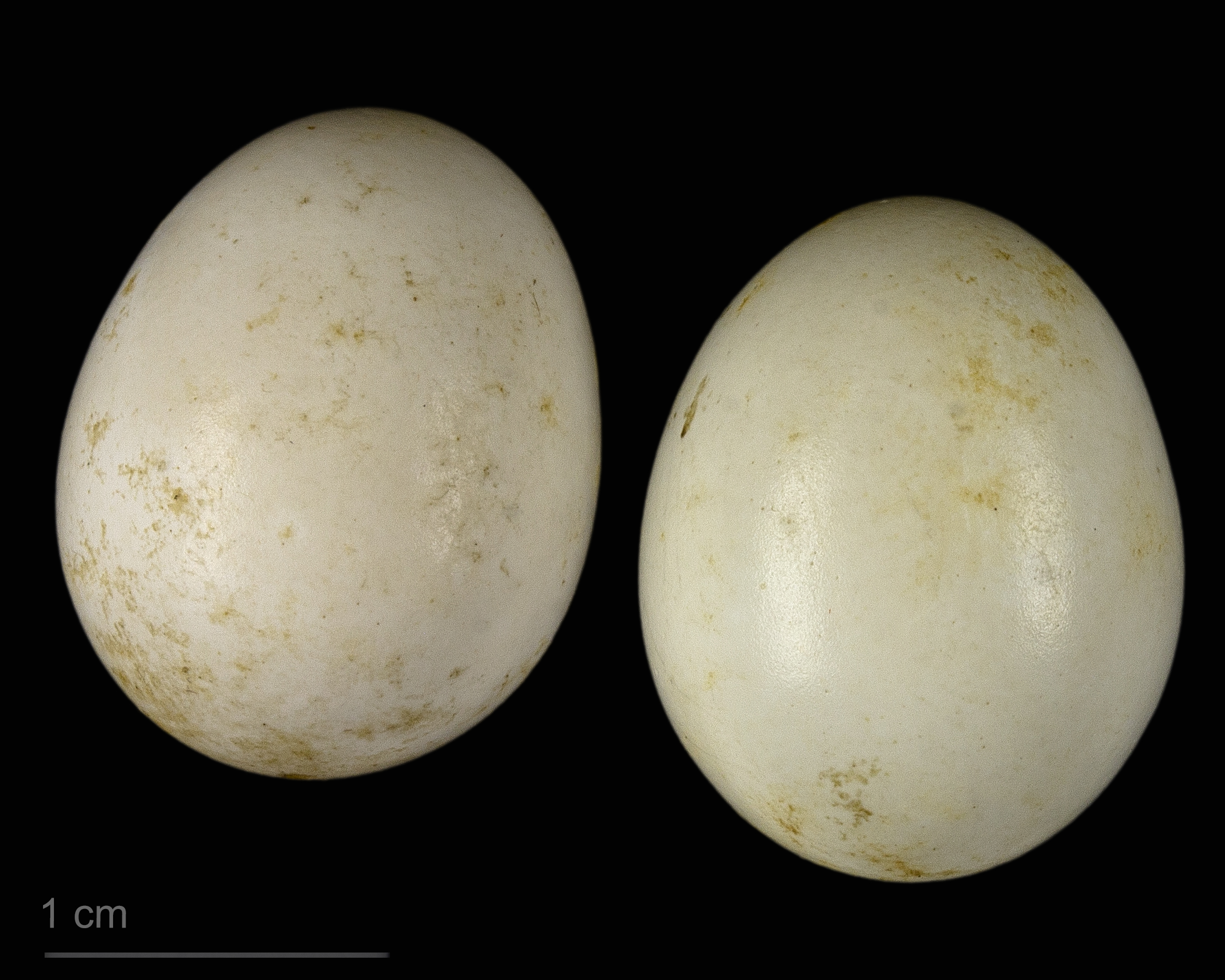
Tichodroma muraria eggs, MHNT.

The female wallcreeper builds a cup nest of grass and moss, sheltered deep in a rock crevice, hole or cave. The nest is lined with softer materials, often including feathers or wool, and typically has two entrances. The female usually lays 4–5 eggs, though clutches as small as three have been found. The white eggs measure 21 mm long, and are marked with a small number of black or reddish-brown speckles. Once her entire clutch has been laid, the female incubates the eggs for 19–20 days, until they hatch. During incubation, she is regularly fed by her mate. Young are altricial, which means they are blind, featherless and helpless at birth. Both parents feed the nestlings for a period of 28–30 days, until the young birds fledge. Each pair raises a single brood a year.

=== Feeding ===
The wallcreeper is an insectivore, feeding on terrestrial invertebrates, primarily insects and spiders, gleaned from rock faces. It sometimes also chases flying insects in short sallies from a rock wall perch. Feeding birds move across a cliff face in short flights and quick hops, often with their wings partially spread.

== In culture ==
With the help of a Motifs Advisory Group, the Governing Council of the European Central Bank selected the "wallcreeper next to a mountain landscape" as a potential front motif for the 2020s redesign of the 5€ banknote, with the reverse featuring the building of the European Parliament.
