= IBAC =

Ibac is a comics character.

IBAC may refer to:

- IBAC (cycling team)
- in-band adjacent-channel
- Identity-based access control
- Independent Broad-based Anti-corruption Commission (Victoria)
- International Business Audit Consulting (IBAC) (Uzbekistan)
- International Business Aviation Council
- International Balloon Arts Conference (IBAC)
- International Bioacoustics Council

== See also ==
- LBAC, Lattice-based access control
- RBAC, Role-based access control
