= Gryllodinus kerkennensis =

Scientific classification
- Domain: Eukaryota
- Kingdom: Animalia
- Phylum: Arthropoda
- Class: Insecta
- Order: Orthoptera
- Suborder: Ensifera
- Family: Gryllidae
- Genus: Gryllodinus
- Species: G. kerkennensis

Binomial name
- Gryllodinus kerkennensis (Finot, 1893)

Species of cricket

Gryllodinus kerkennensis, the silver-bell cricket, is a cricket species which presents a disjunct distribution in the Southern part of the Western Palearctic, from North Africa and the Iberian Peninsula up to Central Asia inhabiting arid, semidesert or desert land mostly associated with saline soils near water sources of lagoons or river beds depressions. The species can be recognized at night by its unique song, to which its common name makes reference.

Its European population (Iberian Peninsula) is highly threatened due to the fragility and scarcity of its specific habitat.
