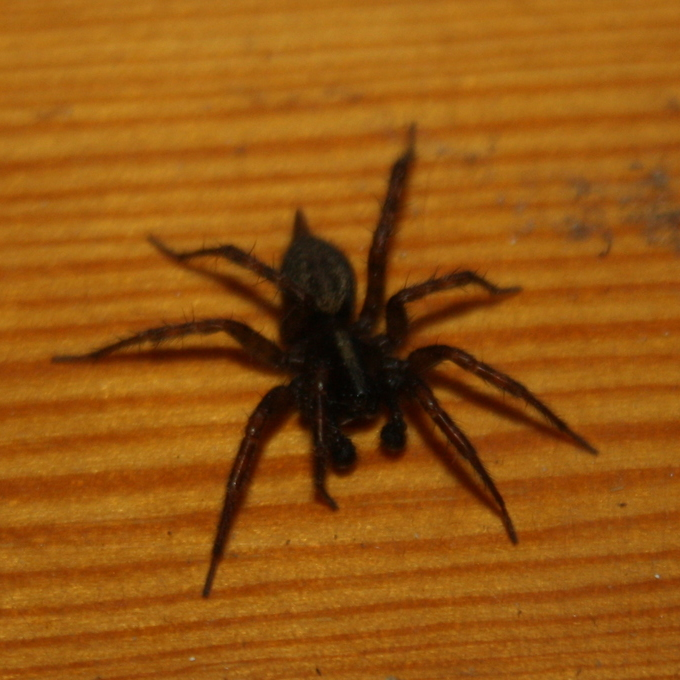
- Male

Scientific classification
- Kingdom: Animalia
- Phylum: Arthropoda
- Subphylum: Chelicerata
- Class: Arachnida
- Order: Araneae
- Infraorder: Araneomorphae
- Family: Agelenidae
- Genus: Maimuna
- Species: M. vestita

Binomial name
- Maimuna vestita (C. L. Koch, 1841)

Synonyms
- Textrix vestita C. L. Koch, 1841; Textrix vestiva Simon, 1864

= Maimuna vestita =

Species of spider

Maimuna vestita is a medium-sized Western Palaearctic species of spider in the family Agelenidae, members of which are commonly known as funnel weavers. It is the type species of the genus Maimuna. The species is distributed in parts of southern Europe, eastern Europe and Turkey, and is the most widely recorded species of the genus.

== Taxonomy ==
Maimuna vestita was first described by Carl Ludwig Koch in 1841 as Textrix vestita. When Pekka T. Lehtinen established the genus Maimuna in 1967, he transferred the species from Textrix and designated it as the type species of the genus. A later review of Turkish Maimuna illustrated and re-diagnosed M. vestita from Turkey.

== Description ==
In males of Maimuna vestita, the body length is about 9 mm, while in females, it is about 7.4 mm. The prosoma is brownish yellow, with a blackish eye region.

The male pedipalp has a large retrolateral scale on the femur and lacks patellar and tibial apophyses. The patella has two dorsal spines, while the tibia has long hairs and four spines. The conductor is complex and ends in three large bent apophyses. In females, the epigyne has a large anterior cavity that is wider and deepest posteriorly, with more strongly sclerotised bordering parts.

== Distribution ==
Maimuna vestita has been recorded from Italy, Croatia, Romania, Ukraine, Albania, North Macedonia, Bulgaria, Greece, and Turkey. It is the most widespread species of Maimuna.

Some regional checklists and faunistic databases give broader eastern Mediterranean or Caucasian distributional summaries for the species. A provisional checklist of spiders from Chios described M. vestita as widespread in the eastern Mediterranean and also occurring in the Balkans, Russia, Azerbaijan, Armenia and the Middle East. The species is also included in the Caucasian Spiders faunistic database. However, the current World Spider Catalog gives a more restricted country list and does not list the species from the Caucasus.

In Turkey, the species has been recorded from both European and Asian parts of the country.

== Habitat and ecology ==
Published ecological records of Maimuna vestita include rocky habitats, cave transition zones and low vegetation. In a study of the spider fauna of Terzioğlu Island in northwestern Turkey, the species was reported as common, especially in rocky habitats, with many webs observed near or under individual stones. In Zindan Cave, Isparta Province, specimens were observed building webs near or under stones in the transition zone of the cave.

The species is not considered a strict troglobite (cave-dwelling) spider. In Zindan Cave, it was classified as a trogloxene predator, occurring in the cave environment while also being known from epigean ecosystems, especially rocky habitats. Small flies were reported as its main food source in the cave.

Maimuna vestita has also been included in faunistic studies of urbanised regions. In the Skopje region, it was listed in a survey based on urban, suburban and rural sampling sites. The species has also been recorded from Istanbul Province in faunistic work on Turkish agelenids.

== Web structure and silk ==
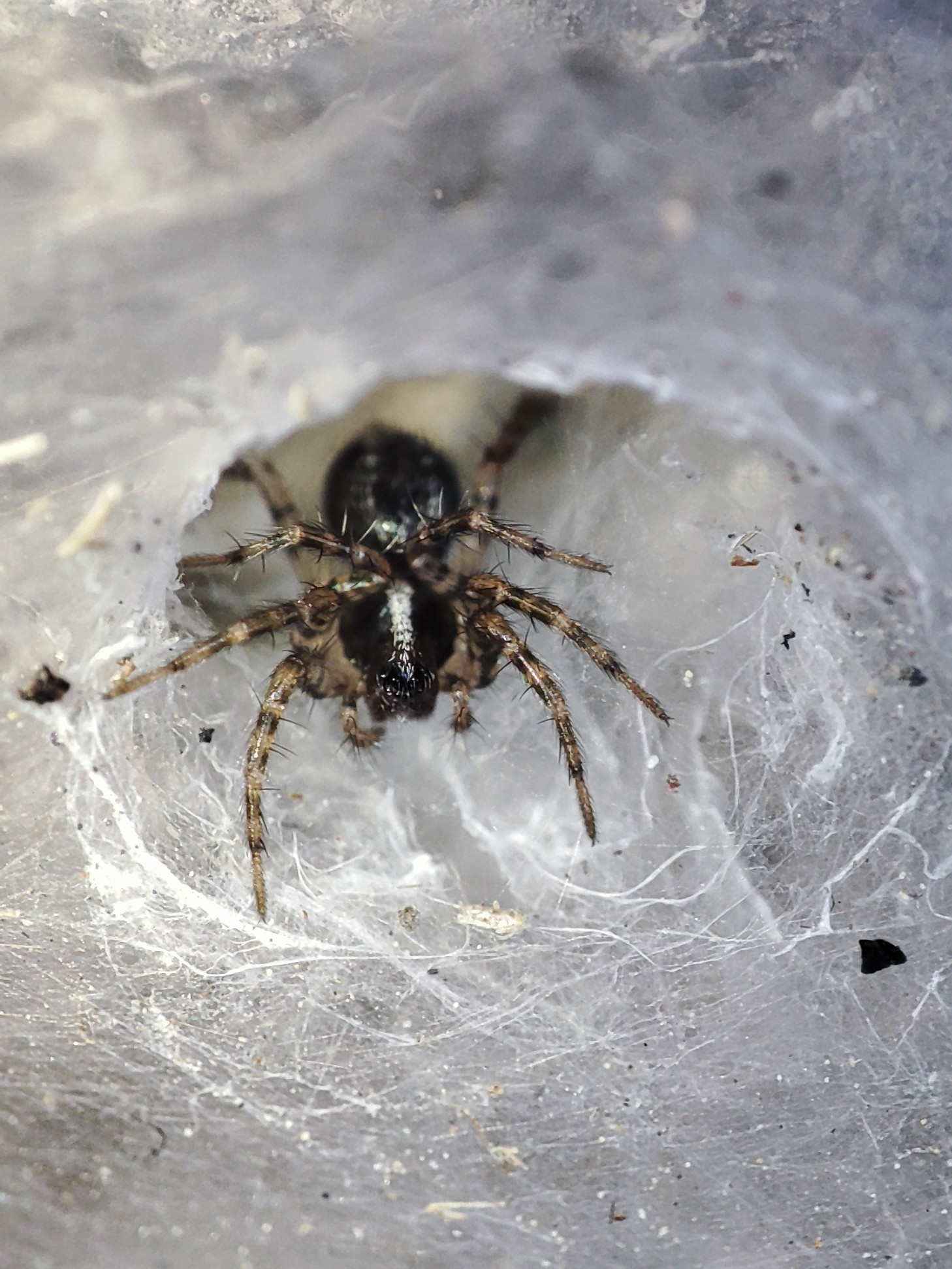
Maimuna vestita in a funnel-shaped web

Maimuna vestita is an ambush predator that spins funnel-shaped webs on grasses, shrubs and trees close to the ground. A scanning electron microscopy study found that its web consists of straight, long silk fibrils rather than a densely crimped structure, with fibrils varying in diameter.

In the same study, spherical adhesive droplets were reported on the silk fibrils. These droplets may occur singly or in groups on a single fibril, and some droplets connect multiple fibrils together. The adhesive droplets were interpreted as contributing to prey retention. The centre and edges of the web differ in fibril thickness and weaving frequency, which may help retain prey after contact with the silk.

The spinning apparatus of M. vestita consists of anterior, middle and posterior spinnerets at the posterior end of the abdomen. The posterior spinnerets are the longest and have two segments, while the anterior spinnerets are shorter and densely covered with hairs.
