= Gryllodinus =

Scientific classification
- Domain: Eukaryota
- Kingdom: Animalia
- Phylum: Arthropoda
- Class: Insecta
- Order: Orthoptera
- Suborder: Ensifera
- Family: Gryllidae
- Tribe: Gryllini
- Genus: Gryllodinus; Bolívar, 1927

Species
- See text

Genus of crickets

Gryllodinus is a genus of crickets in tribe Gryllini; species are recorded from Africa, the Iberian peninsula, the middle East and western Asia.

== Taxonomy ==
The genus contains the following species:

- Gryllodinus abditus Gorochov, 1979
- Gryllodinus kerkennensis (Finot, 1893) - type species (locality Tunis)
- Gryllodinus odicus (Uvarov, 1911)
