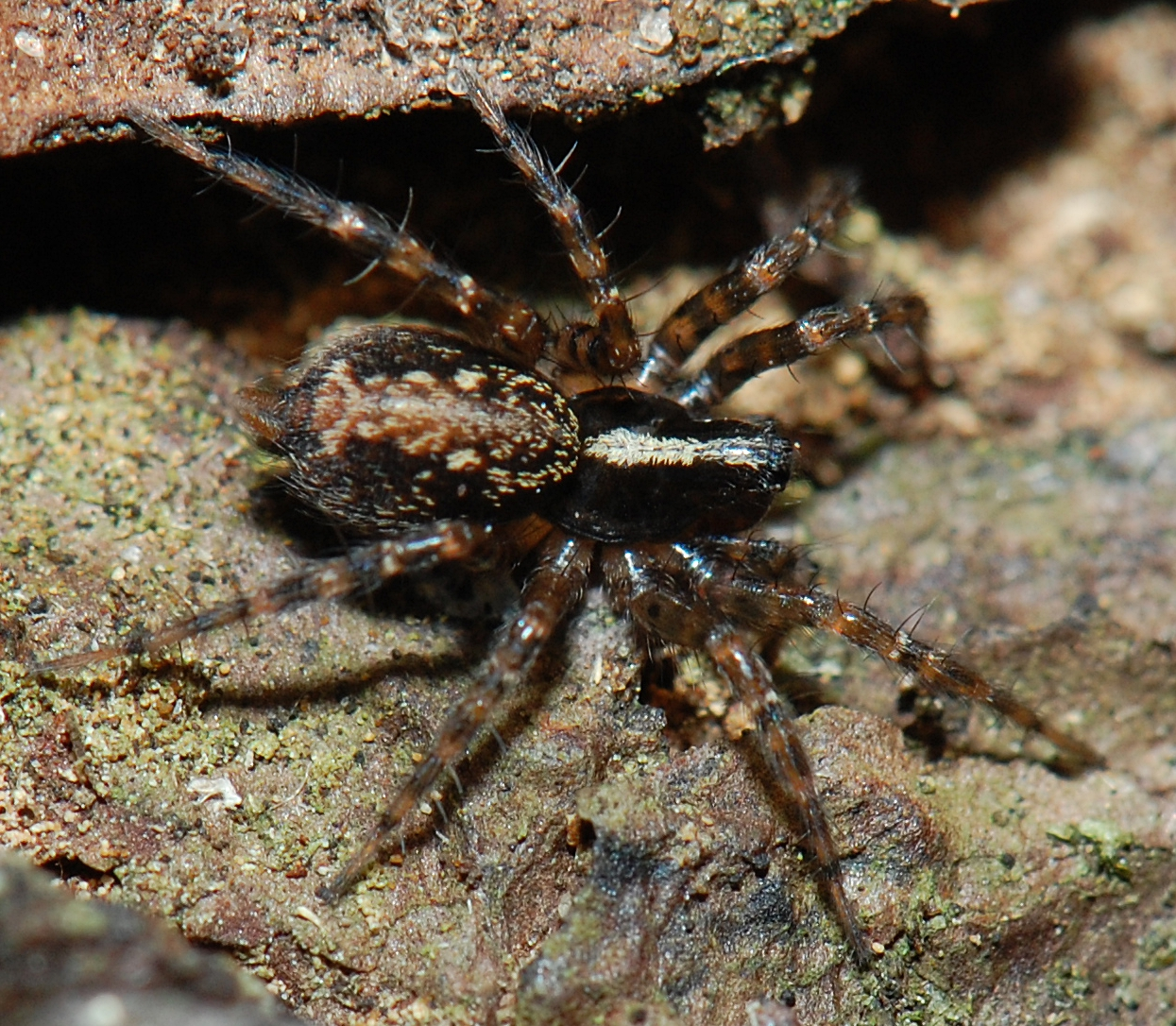

Scientific classification
- Domain: Eukaryota
- Kingdom: Animalia
- Phylum: Arthropoda
- Subphylum: Chelicerata
- Class: Arachnida
- Order: Araneae
- Infraorder: Araneomorphae
- Family: Agelenidae
- Genus: Textrix
- Species: T. denticulata

Binomial name
- Textrix denticulata (Olivier, 1789)

Synonyms
- Aranea cruciger Martini & Goeze, 1778 Nomen oblitum; Aranea denticulata Olivier, 1789; Agelena lycosina Sundevall, 1831; Textrix agilis Blackwall, 1833; Textrix lycosina (Sundevall, 1831); Tegenaria lycosina (Sundevall, 1831); Tegenaria fuliginea Lucas, 1844; Agelena boopis O. Pickard-Cambridge, 1863; Textrix lusitanica Kulczyński, 1911; Tegenaria lusitanica (Kulczyński, 1911)

= Textrix denticulata =

Species of spider

Textrix denticulata, the toothed weaver, is a funnel web spider of the family Agelenidae found in much of Europe. It was described by the French entomologist Guillaume-Antoine Olivier in 1789. An older name coined by Martini & Goeze in 1778, Aranea cruciger, has been declared a nomen oblitum, allowing Olivier's later name to stand.

== Description ==
The male Textrix denticulata is similar to the female in general appearance. The carapace is dark brown with a light median band. The head is narrow, with steep sides, not unlike wolf spiders of the genus Pardosa. The abdomen is dark brown with a light horse-shoe shaped marking towards the anterior which breaks down into a series of light spots towards the posterior. There are vague, somewhat reddish chevrons due to the relatively thinner coating of hairs between the horseshoe mark and the posterior spotting which causes the background colour of the abdomen to be visible. The legs are yellow-brown with dark annulations and rings of white hairs. The body length of the female is 7–8 mm, that of the slightly smaller male 6–7 mm.

== Biology ==
Textrix denticulata builds small funnel webs that end in a tube where the spider sits until it detects its prey touch the web when it leaves the tube and subdues the prey. It is mostly active at night. Both sexes are mainly found from early to mid-summer but females can be found at most times of the year and males have also been recorded in September. The yellow egg sac contains 50-60 eggs and is covered with soil particles and stones and secured under rocks and in crevices.

== Habitat ==
Textrix denticulata is found in sunny edges of forests, on rocks and on walls and sometimes in houses. In Great Britain it is found on stony ground, in rocky crevices, on low bushes and under bark, both inland and in coastal areas. Here too it is equally common in houses and on some disused stony industrial sites.

== Distribution ==
Textrix denticulata is widespread in Northern Europe, except the northern and eastern part. In Great Britain this spider is common in the north, less so in the south, and very rare in the southeast.
