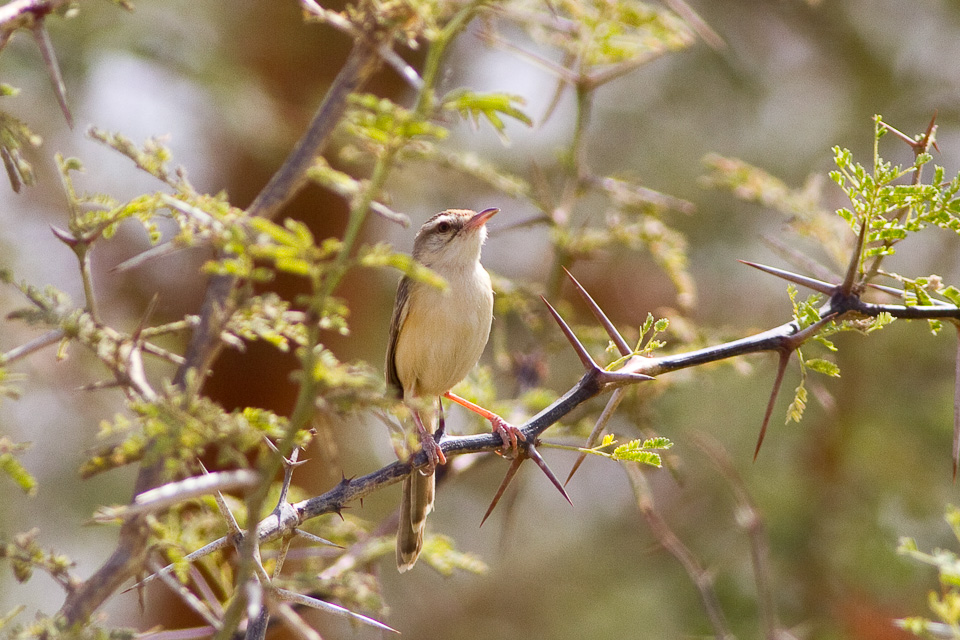

Conservation status
- Least Concern (IUCN 3.1)

Scientific classification
- Kingdom: Animalia
- Phylum: Chordata
- Class: Aves
- Order: Passeriformes
- Family: Cisticolidae
- Genus: Prinia
- Species: P. fluviatilis

Binomial name
- Prinia fluviatilis Chappuis, 1974

= River prinia =

Species of bird

The river prinia (Prinia fluviatilis) is a species of bird of the family Cisticolidae. It is found in northwestern Senegal, along the Niger River (near the border between Mali and Niger), in the Lake Chad region and in northwestern Kenya. Its natural habitats are subtropical or tropical moist shrubland and swamps.
