= List of Recent Holarctic Bird Species =

1977 book by Karel H. Voous

- Author: Karel H. Voous
- Language: English
- Publisher: British Ornithologists' Union
- Publication date: 1977
- Publication place: United Kingdom
- Media type: Print (Paperback)
- ISBN: 0-907446-13-2
- OCLC: 45863099

List of Recent Holarctic Bird Species is a 1977 book by Karel H. Voous, published by the British Ornithologists' Union. It contains a list of 1,921 bird species recorded from the Holarctic zoogeographic region. It was widely adopted by ornithologists in Europe as a standard baseline list. It was originally published in two parts in the BOU's journal Ibis: that covering the non-passerines in 1973, and the passerine part in 1977. The list has been reprinted twice, in 1980 and 1991. It contains a foreword by Sir Hugh Elliott.

== Geographical scope ==
In the western Palearctic region, the list adopts the same geographical limits as those used by the editors of the handbook The Birds of the Western Palearctic. The whole of the Arabian Peninsula and Iran are also included; further east, Voous followed the boundaries used by Hartert (1903–1923) and Vaurie (1959, 1965). In the Nearctic region, the list covers all of the continental U.S. and Canada, the Bahama Islands, plus the non-tropical parts of Mexico (defined as the states of Baja California, Sonora, Chihuahua, Durango, Zacatecas, Aguascalientes, Guanajuato, Querétaro, México, Distrito Federal, Coahuila and Nuevo León).

== Bibliography ==
Voous, K. H. (1977) List of Recent Holarctic Bird Species British Ornithologists' Union ISBN 0-907446-13-2
