= Claude Chappuis =

French physician-radiologist, ornithologist, and bioacoustician

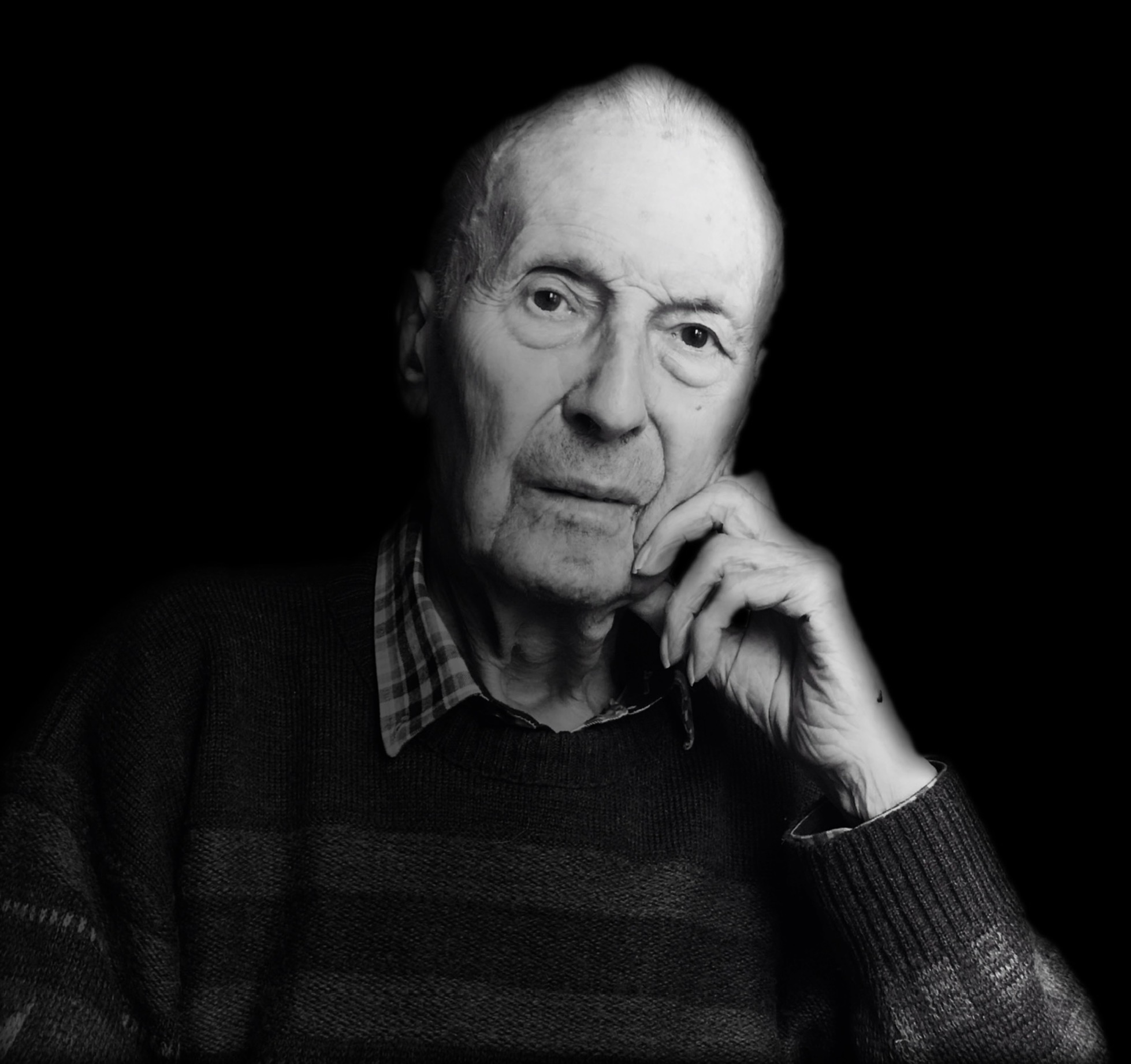
- Chappuis in 2021
- Born: 30 September 1924; Lille
- Died: 13 June 2021 (aged 96); Bois-Guillaume
- Education: University of Paris; University of Lille (PhD)
- Known for: Acoustic window
- Awards: CNRS Bronze medal (1972)
- Scientific career
- Fields: Radiology, ornithology and bioacoustics
- Doctoral advisor: René Legrand

Claude Paul Chappuis, born on 30 September 1924 in Lille, Nord (France) and deceased on 13 June 2021 in Bois-Guillaume, Seine-Maritime (France), was a French physician-radiologist, ornithologist, and bioacoustician. He is best known for recording and cataloguing birdsongs from around the world.

== Early life ==
Claude Chappuis was born in Lille, in the north of France, the son of engineer Claude René Chappuis and Marie Alice Koechlin. Born into an old Protestant upper-class family, Chappuis was heir to a distinguished lineage. His mother belonged to the renowned Koechlin family, as did his paternal grandmother (née Kestner). Through the latter, he was descended from Charlotte Buff — the woman who inspired Goethe’s The Sorrows of Young Werther and its heroine, Lotte, with whom the poet was famously infatuated. Both of his parents traced their ancestry to the Swiss mathematician and physicist Jean Bernoulli of Basel. On his mother's side, Chappuis was also descended from Johannes Hofer (1669-1752), the 17th and 18th century Alsatian physician credited with coining the term nostalgia. His family tree was interwoven with many of the great industrial dynasties of Mulhouse, including Schlumberger, Dollfus, Mieg, and others. Among his relatives were Maurice Koechlin, the original designer of the Eiffel Tower and close collaborator of Gustave Eiffel; Baron Haussmann, the celebrated urban planner of Paris; Paul Curie, grandfather of Pierre Curie; and Auguste Scheurer-Kestner, life senator, first vice-president of the French Senate, and early defender of Captain Dreyfus.

Sent to boarding school, Chappuis was introduced to the natural sciences at an early age and developed a lasting fascination with entomology. The turbulent years surrounding the Liberation prevented him from pursuing studies in Paris, where he was performing his military service as a firefighter. He ultimately earned a doctorate in medicine from the Faculty of Medicine and Pharmacy at the University of Lille in 1959, specializing in electro-radiology. A passionate jazz enthusiast and friend of Hugues Panassié, former regional president of the Hot Club de France, Chappuis organised numerous concerts in the Lille area during the 1940s and 1950s. He brought to the region such legendary musicians as Louis Armstrong, Sidney Bechet, and Mezz Mezzrow, many of whom became personal friends.

== Ornithology and Bioacoustics ==
After establishing his radiology practice in Rouen in 1960, Chappuis developed a growing interest in ornithology. From 1962 onward, he became interested in the emerging science of bioacoustics. He tried several portable tape recorders, but he was eager to capture the full range of modulations and harmonics in birdsong. So in 1969, he approached Stefan Kudelski, founder of Nagra, to commission a custom magnetic tape recorder capable of registering frequencies far beyond the 20 kHz limit of standard Nagra equipment. The remarkable fidelity of his recordings, their bioacoustic analysis, and their application to eco-ethology and taxonomy earned him recognition from the CNRS, which awarded him its Bronze medal in 1972. Gifted with an exceptionally keen ear, Chappuis, working with ecologist and CNRS research director Jean-Marc Thiollay, identified birds of the genus Prinia that he believed to be distinct from Prinia Subflava. To this newly discovered species he gave the name of Prinia Fluviatilis. Chappuis authored two pioneering scientific papers: the first, in 1968 (co-written with André Brosset), on the anti-predator adaptations of young birds’ calls; and the second, in 1971, on the transmission of sounds in forest environments. The latter provided the first experimental evidence for what would later be known as the "acoustic window" or "Morton's window" · . His research took him across five continents — to North, East, West, and Southern Africa; Brazil; the Canary Islands; throughout Europe; the Galápagos Islands; India; Madagascar; Papua New Guinea; the Seychelles; and Thailand. Yet Africa remained the heart of his work. His dedication to the continent, and to the newly independent Republic of Senegal, earned him the esteem and respect of President Léopold Sédar Senghor, to whom he sent his recordings. In return, Senghor dedicated to him several of his latest works celebrating the natural beauty of Senegal's ecosystems. In 1982, Chappuis settled in La Bouille, Seine-Maritime (France). His deep expertise in birdsong led him to serve as sound editor for The Birds of Africa, one of the most authoritative ornithological references worldwide. His vast sound collection also brought him recognition in the audiovisual field, with credits in programs such as Les Animaux du Monde (TF1) and the acclaimed documentary Winged Migration. A member of the Ligue pour la protection des oiseaux (LPO) and the Normandy Ornithological Group (Groupe Ornithologique Normand, GONm), he was also a founding member and former president of the Society for Ornithological Studies in France (Société d’études ornithologiques de France, SEOF), based at the National Museum of Natural History in Paris. Chappuis served on the committee of the International Bioacoustics Council (IBAC) and organized two of its symposia in 1973 and 1987.

Filmmaker Zsòfia Pesovàr, in collaboration with Marie-Pierre Groud and Catherine Bouchain-Kazy, dedicated a documentary to Chappuis’ life and work, produced by Pygargue Films.

Claude Chappuis had created the largest personal archive of bird songs in the world. He passed away in Bois-Guillaume on 13 June 2021, three months before his 97th birthday. His collection contained recordings of hundreds of rarely documented species, including 28 newly represented in the Macaulay archives, and even those of species now believed extinct, such as the Slender-billed Curlew (Numenius tenuirostris), last seen in 1996. After his death, his extraordinary private collection was bequeathed to the Macaulay Library at Cornell University in Ithaca, New York. Cornell is home to the Cornell Lab of Ornithology, the world's leading ornithological research institution with which he had long collaborated.

== Discography and works ==
=== Discography ===
- Migrateurs et hivernants, 1re partie – Claude Chappuis – 1987
- Migrateurs et hivernants, 2e partie – Claude Chappuis – 1987
- African Bird Sounds, Vol. 1 – Claude Chappuis – British Library, National Sound Archive et Société d'études ornithologiques de France – 2001
- African Bird Sounds, Vol. 2 – Claude Chappuis – British Library, National Sound Archive et Société d'études ornithologiques de France – 2001
- Oiseaux de Madagascar, Mayotte, Comores, Seychelles, Réunion, Maurice – Claude Chappuis, avec Pierre Huguet – Société d'études ornithologiques de France – 2004
- Indian Bird Sounds: The Indian peninsula – Claude Chappuis, avec Fernand Deroussen et Deepal Warakagoda – Anne Chappuis – 2009
- Les Visiteurs des rivages – Pierre Huguet, avec Claude Chappuis – Édition du Baobab et Conseil général de Mayotte, Délégation à l’Environnement – 2004
- Maîtres chanteurs – Guilhem Lesaffre, avec Claude Chappuis, Fernand Deroussen et Alain Jouffray (photographies) – Éditions du Chêne (Hachette) – 2005
- Vogelstimmen im Flug – Hans-Heiner Bergmann, Claude Chappuis, Karl-Heinz Dingler – Musikverlag Edition AMPLE – 2014

=== Works ===
Books

- The Birds of Africa, vol. 2 – Charles Hilary Fry, Stuart Keith, Emil Urban, authors, Claude Chappuis, sound editor, Martin Woodcock, illustrator – Academic Press
- The Birds of Africa, vol. 3 – Charles Hilary Fry, Stuart Keith, Emil Urban, authors, Claude Chappuis, sound editor, Martin Woodcock, illustrator – Academic Press
- The Birds of Africa, vol. 4 – Charles Hilary Fry, Stuart Keith, Emil Urban, authors, Claude Chappuis, sound editor, Martin Woodcock, illustrator – Academic Press
- The Birds of Africa, vol. 5 – Charles Hilary Fry, Stuart Keith, Emil Urban, authors, Claude Chappuis, sound editor, Martin Woodcock, illustrator – Academic Press
- The Birds of Africa, vol. 6 – Charles Hilary Fry, Stuart Keith, Emil Urban, authors, Claude Chappuis, sound editor, Martin Woodcock, illustrator – Academic Press

Essays

- Un cline vocal chez les oiseaux paléarctiques : variation tonale des vocalisations sous différentes latitudes – Claude Chappuis (1969) – n°37, pages 59 à 71 – Alauda
- Origine et évolution des vocalisations de certains oiseaux de Corse et des Baléares – Claude Chappuis (1976) – n°44, pages 475 à 495 – Alauda
