= The Birds of the Western Palearctic =

Book on ornithology

- The cover of volume 1 of the full edition
- Language: English
- Published: 1977–1996 (Oxford University Press)
- Publication place: United Kingdom
- Media type: Print (Hardback)

The Birds of the Western Palearctic (full title Handbook of the Birds of Europe, the Middle East, and North Africa: The Birds of the Western Palearctic; often referred to by the initials BWP) is a nine-volume ornithological handbook covering the birds of the western portion of the Palearctic zoogeographical region.

== Antecedents ==
Earlier books of comparable scope include:

- Dresser's nine-volume A History of the Birds of Europe, Including all the Species Inhabiting the Western Palearctic Region (1871–1896)
- Witherby et al.'s five-volume Handbook of British Birds (1938–1941)

== Book ==
The Birds of the Western Palearctic is a comprehensive regional avifauna for the Western Palearctic. It consists of 9 volumes, the first published in 1977 and the ninth in 1994. The main editor for the first five volumes was Stanley Cramp. Cramp died in 1987 and the subsequent volumes were edited by Duncan Brooks and Christopher Perrins. BWP's format and breadth influenced the development of regional avifaunas for other parts of the world, notably The Birds of Africa.

The titles of the nine volumes were:

- Volume I: Ostrich to Ducks
- Volume II: Hawks to Bustards
- Volume III: Waders to Gulls
- Volume IV: Terns to Woodpeckers
- Volume V: Tyrant Flycatchers to Thrushes
- Volume VI: Warblers
- Volume VII: Flycatchers to Shrikes
- Volume VIII: Crows to Finches
- Volume IX: Buntings and New World Warblers

A two-volume Concise Edition was produced in 1998. Both the full and concise editions were published by Oxford University Press (OUP).

The boundary used for the region included Iceland, but not Greenland; all of Macaronesia (islands off Portugal and North Africa); North Africa; the northern parts of the Arabian Peninsula; Iraq and Kuwait, but not Iran; and Russia west of the Urals. A number of subsequent papers have questioned the appropriateness of this boundary, particularly its southern and southeastern delimitations, among them Martins & Hirschfeld (1994). Martins and Hirschfeld published a more detailed paper in 1998, discussing the boundary in Iran and the Arabian Peninsula. They concluded that the mountainous western and northern areas of Iran, and the Arabian peninsula, except for two small enclaves in the south, should be included in the Western Palearctic. Ullman (2000) disagreed with their conclusions regarding the Arabian enclaves, however, arguing that their depauperate avifauna, when compared to species-rich areas in northeast Africa, justified inclusion of the whole of Arabia in the Western Palearctic. Roselaar (2006), analysing the breeding distributions of 1037 passerine bird species in the Palearctic region, and northern parts of the Afrotropical and Oriental regions, also proposed a southern boundary somewhat to the south of that used by BWP. He excluded southernmost parts of Arabia, albeit with a slightly different border to that used by Martins & Hirschfeld.

A journal, BWP Update, was published for a number of years following the completion of BWP.

Three electronic versions of BWP have been produced. The first, produced by OUP, suffered from a number of technical problems. The second, known as "BWPi", was produced by BirdGuides Ltd. This included the full text of the nine volumes, the Concise Edition, all updates from BWP Update, new video and audio, and recent taxonomical changes. The third version was released as an iOS app by NatureGuides in 2020 with an integrated video library and updated taxonomy, though distribution and population data were not updated.

== Publication data ==
=== BWP ===
- Volume 1 (1977): ISBN 978-0-19-857358-6, 722 pages
- Volume 2 (1980): ISBN 978-0-19-857505-4, 696 pages
- Volume 3 (1983): ISBN 978-0-19-857506-1, 913 pages
- Volume 4 (1985): ISBN 978-0-19-857507-8, 960 pages
- Volume 5 (1988): ISBN 978-0-19-857508-5, 1136 pages
- Volume 6 (1992): ISBN 978-0-19-857509-2, 760 pages
- Volume 7 (1993): ISBN 978-0-19-857510-8, 610 pages
- Volume 8 (1994): ISBN 978-0-19-854679-5, 956 pages
- Volume 9 (1994): ISBN 978-0-19-854843-0, 522 pages

=== BWP Concise ===
- Snow, D. W. & Perrins, C. M. (1998). The Birds of the Western Palearctic Concise Edition. ISBN 0-19-854099-X.
