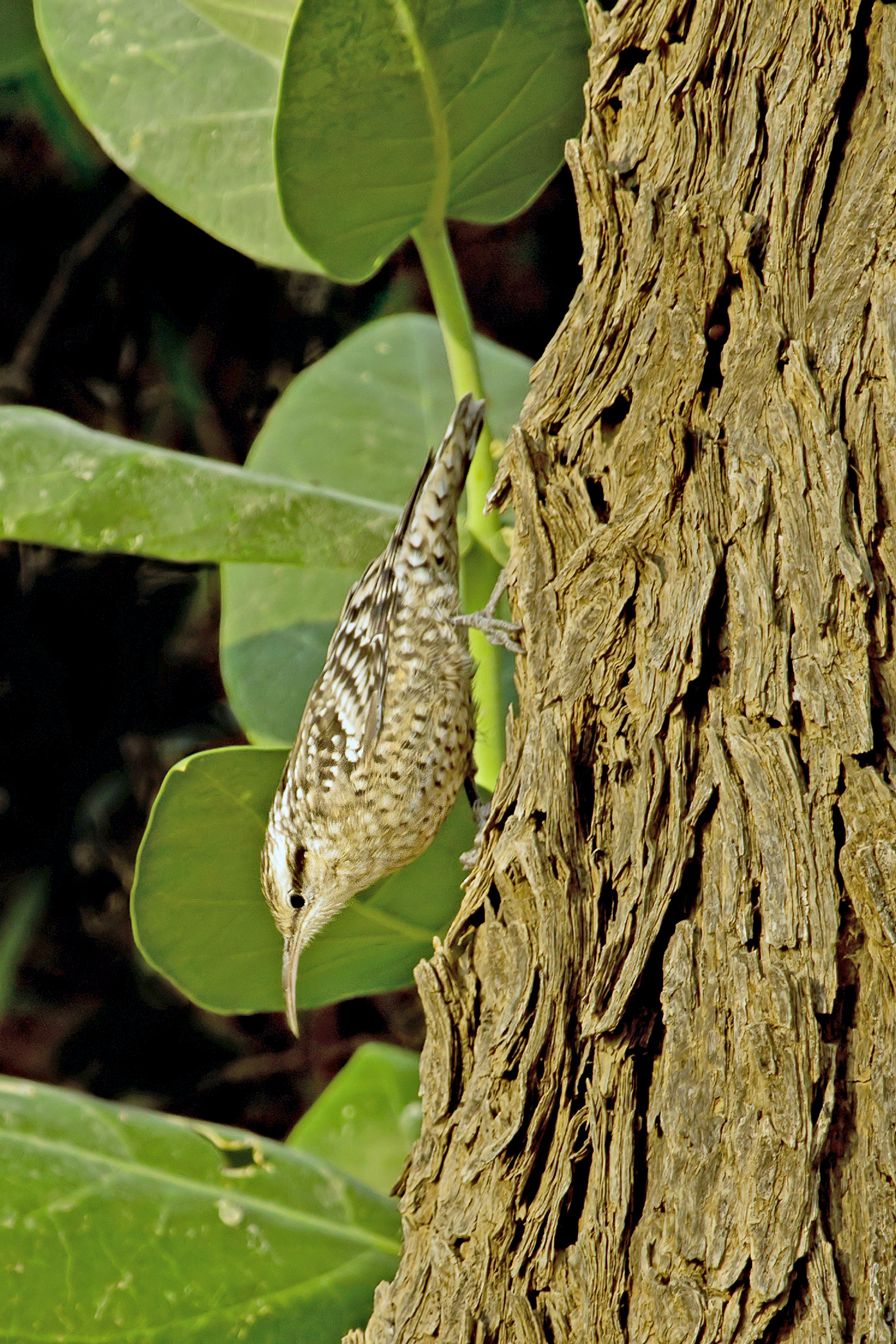
- Indian spotted creeper (Salpornis spilonota)

Scientific classification
- Kingdom: Animalia
- Phylum: Chordata
- Class: Aves
- Order: Passeriformes
- Superfamily: Certhioidea
- Family: Salpornithidae
- Genus: Salpornis; G.R. Gray, 1847

Type species
- Certhia spilonota Franklin, 1831

Species
- S. spilonota S. salvadori

= Salpornis =

Genus of birds

Salpornis is a genus of birds which was usually included in the family Certhiidae, but recently elevated to its own family Salpornithidae. The genus has in the past also been included with the nuthatches in the family Sittidae. Molecular phylogenetic analyses show them to be definitely within the Certhioidea but still leaves some uncertainty about their placement in relation to the genera Sitta, Tichodroma and Certhia. While they appear similar to the treecreepers (Certhia), they do not use their tails to support them while climbing and some molecular evidence shows them to be closer to the nuthatches (Sitta) while another study suggests a closer relation to the wallcreeper Tichodroma muraria. The generic name is derived from the Greek salpinktes for wren and ornis for bird.

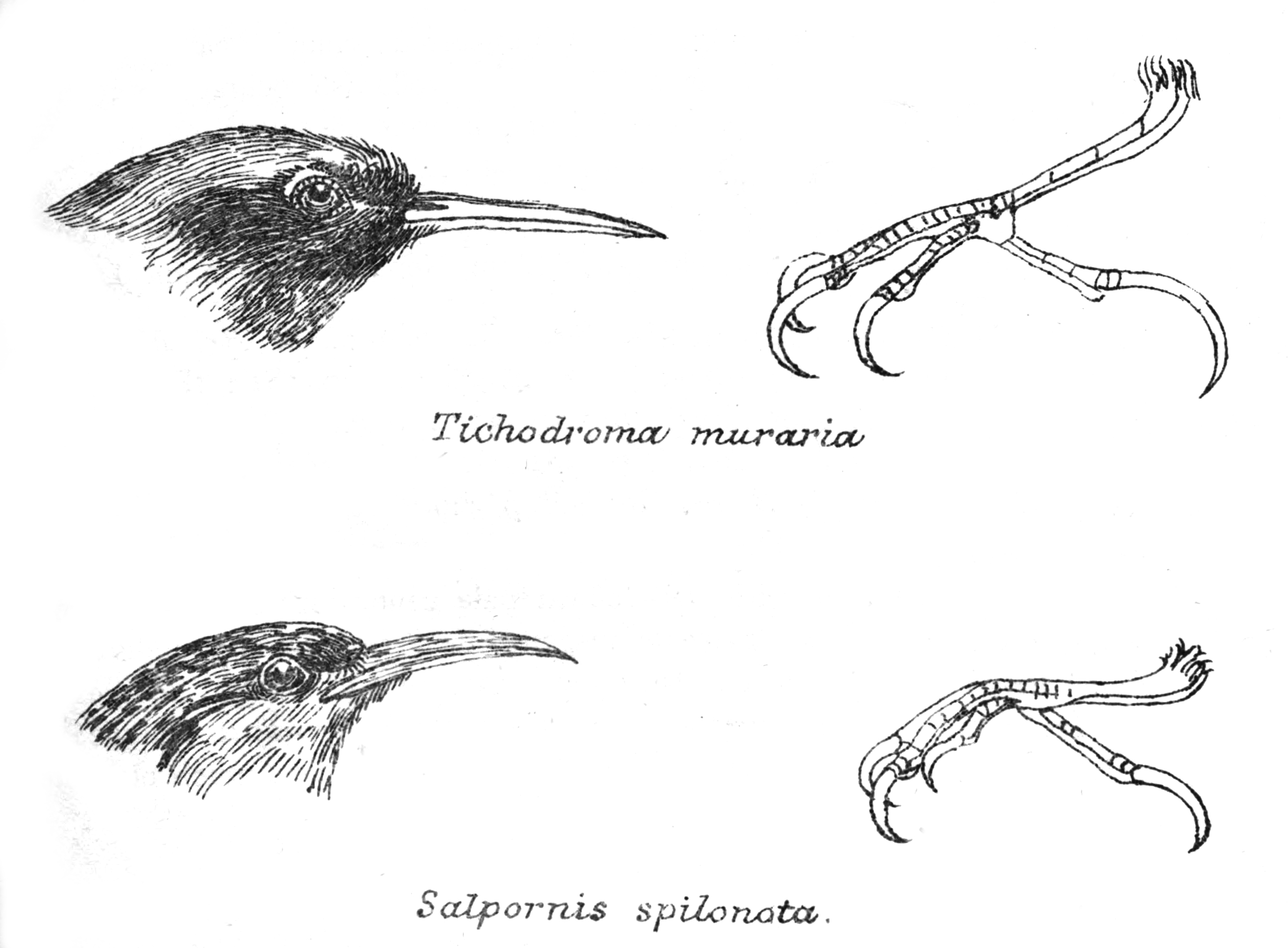
Heads and legs of Tichodroma and Salpornis

The tail has twelve feathers and is rounded at the tips. The nostril is exposed and there are no rictal bristles. The tongue ends in five bristles.

The genus has two species with the African species earlier considered as a subspecies. Differences in size, calls and mitochondrial DNA sequences have supported the splitting of the African and Indian populations.

- Indian spotted creeper (Salpornis spilonota)
- African spotted creeper (Salpornis salvadori) with four subspecies.
