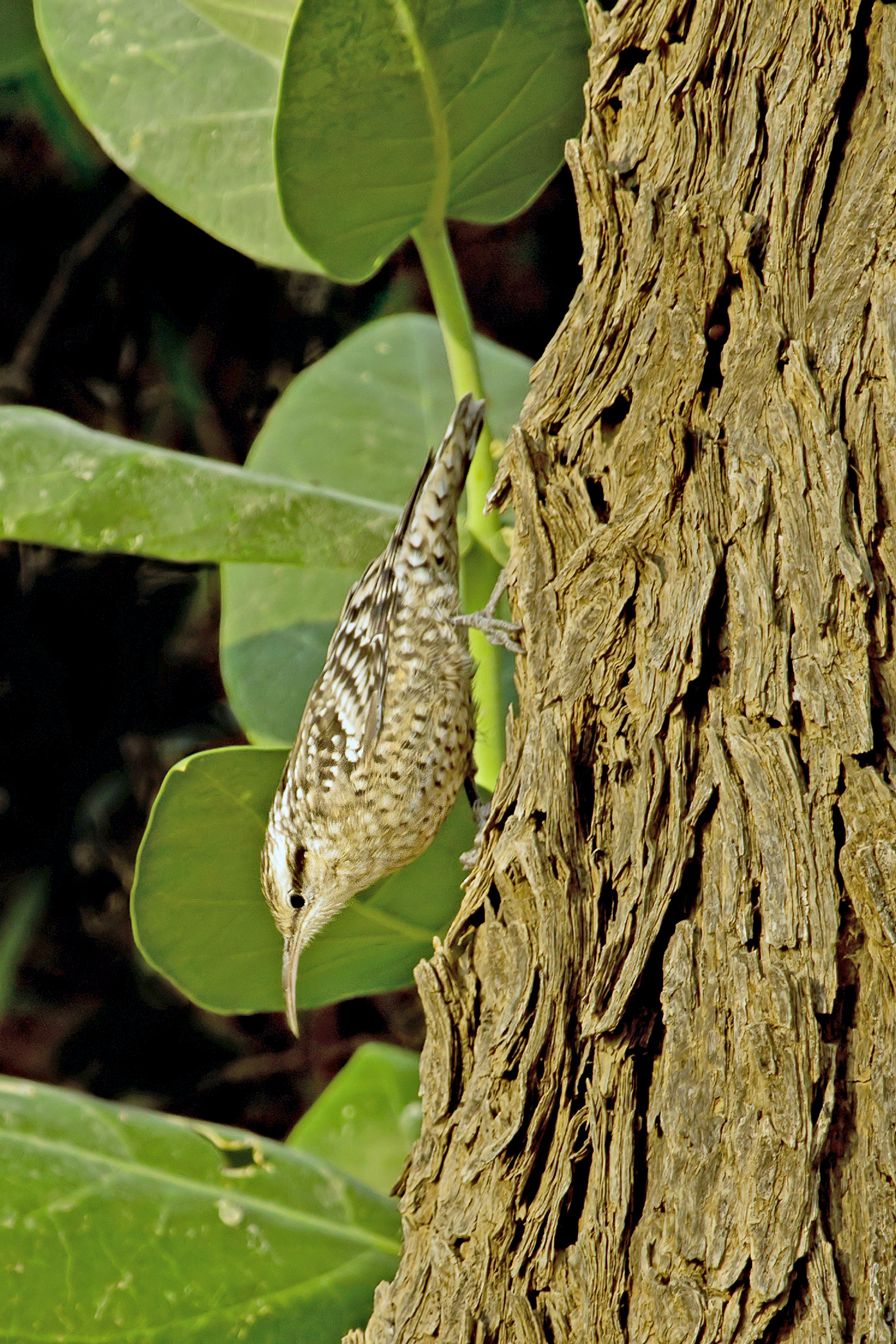
- In Churu, Rajasthan, India

Conservation status
- Least Concern (IUCN 3.1)

Scientific classification
- Kingdom: Animalia
- Phylum: Chordata
- Class: Aves
- Order: Passeriformes
- Family: Salpornithidae
- Genus: Salpornis
- Species: S. spilonota

Binomial name
- Salpornis spilonota (Franklin, 1831)

Synonyms
- Certhia spilonota protonym; Salpornis spilonotus

= Indian spotted creeper =

Species of bird

The Indian spotted creeper (Salpornis spilonota) is a small passerine bird that is a member of the family Salpornithidae, which was previously treated as a subfamily of Certhiidae. This small bird has a marbled black and white plumage that makes it difficult to spot as it forages on the trunks of dark, deeply fissured trees where it picks out insect prey using its curved bill. It is found in patchily distributed localities mainly in the dry scrub and open deciduous forests of northern and central peninsular India. It does not migrate. Their inclusion along with the treecreepers is not certain and some studies find them more closely related to the nuthatches while others suggest a close relation to the wallcreeper. They lack the stiff tail feathers of treecreepers and do not use their tail for supporting them while creeping vertically along tree trunks.

== Description ==
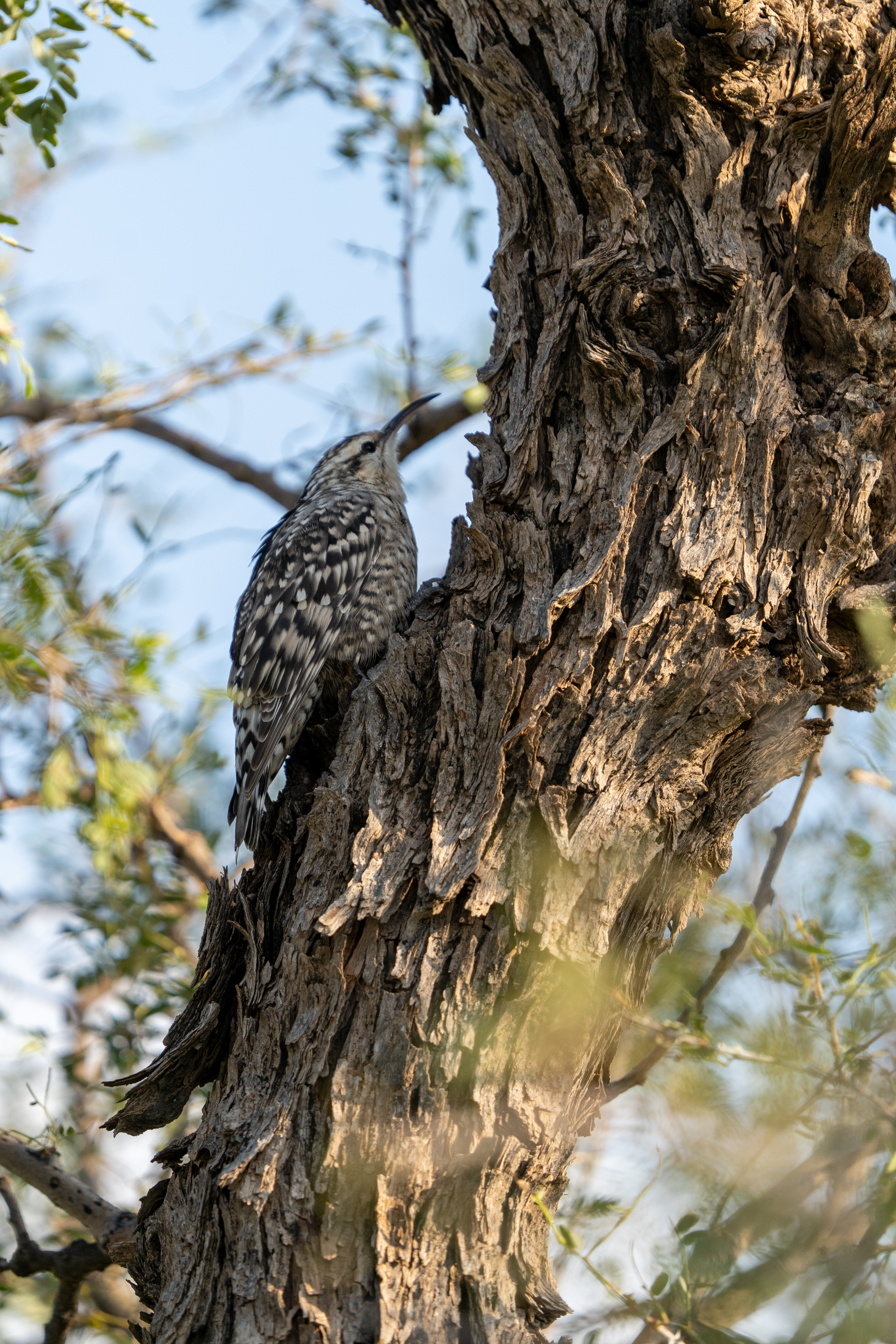
Marbled grey and white plumage against deeply fissured bark, at Tal Chhapar Sanctuary, Rajasthan

The Indian spotted creeper has grey and white spotted and barred plumage, clearly different from the treecreepers of the family Certhiidae. It weighs up to 16 grams, twice as much as treecreepers of similar length (up to 15 cm). The Indian spotted creeper has a thin pointed down-curved bill, a bit longer than the head, that it uses to extricate insects from bark, but it lacks the stiff tail feathers which treecreepers use to prop themselves on the vertical surface of tree trunks. They have a whitish supercilium contrasting with a dark eye stripe and white on the throat. The wing is long and pointed with a highly reduced first primary feather. The tail has twelve feathers and is square tailed. The sexes are identical in plumage.

The tarsus is stout and they have a long hind claw (average 8.9 ± 0.48 (s.d.) mm). The bill is 25.9±1.29 mm, the length of the wing is 88.5±2.76 mm and the tail is 53.8±2.05 mm long.

== Classification and naming ==
This species was first described by Major James Franklin in 1831 who provided a brief description in Latin and placed it in the genus Certhia as Certhia spilonota while noting that the tail feathers were not stiff as is typical for the genus. George Robert Gray at the British Museum erected the genus Salpornis and placed this species in it as Salpornis spilonota. When similar species were found in Africa, they were added as subspecies of the Indian species. It was only in 2010 that molecular, morpholological and vocal differences were studied, which resulted in the African species being considered distinct species. Scholars of nomenclature emended the ending spilonota which is suited for the feminine gender Certhia to the masculine form spilonotus to match the placement in the genus Salpornis. In 2014, Dickinson & Christidis cited the rule that the species group epithet is invariable, so the species name was changed back to the spelling used in the original description as spilonota. Older works use the name "spotted grey creeper".

The genus has been placed with the treecreepers in family Certhiidae despite being significantly different from other members. However, a phylogenomic study in 2019 found them to be the sister group of Certhiidae with a sufficiently early divergence to justify placement in their own family. Previously, some molecular studies had shown ambiguity in their relations, finding them more closely related to the nuthatches in the genus Sitta or the wallcreepers in genus Tichodroma, which is the basal group within the superfamily Certhioidea.

== Distribution and habitat ==
The African spotted creeper was formerly considered conspecific. Together they were called spotted creeper. The Indian species is nowhere common but is found in locations scattered around parts of Rajasthan, Gujarat, Haryana, Uttar Pradesh, central India (Bandhavgarh, Jabalpur, Bastar district) Orissa, northern Andhra Pradesh (Adilabad, Kawal Wildlife Sanctuary). In the past the slightly paler plumaged population in the arid zone of the Aravalli hills was separated as a subspecies rajputanae by Richard Meinertzhagen (and his wife) but this is treated as part of a single population and combined into a single (nominate) subspecies.

The species is found mainly in habitats having trees with deeply fissured bark including those of Acacia, Diospyros, Tectona and mango.

== Behaviour and ecology ==
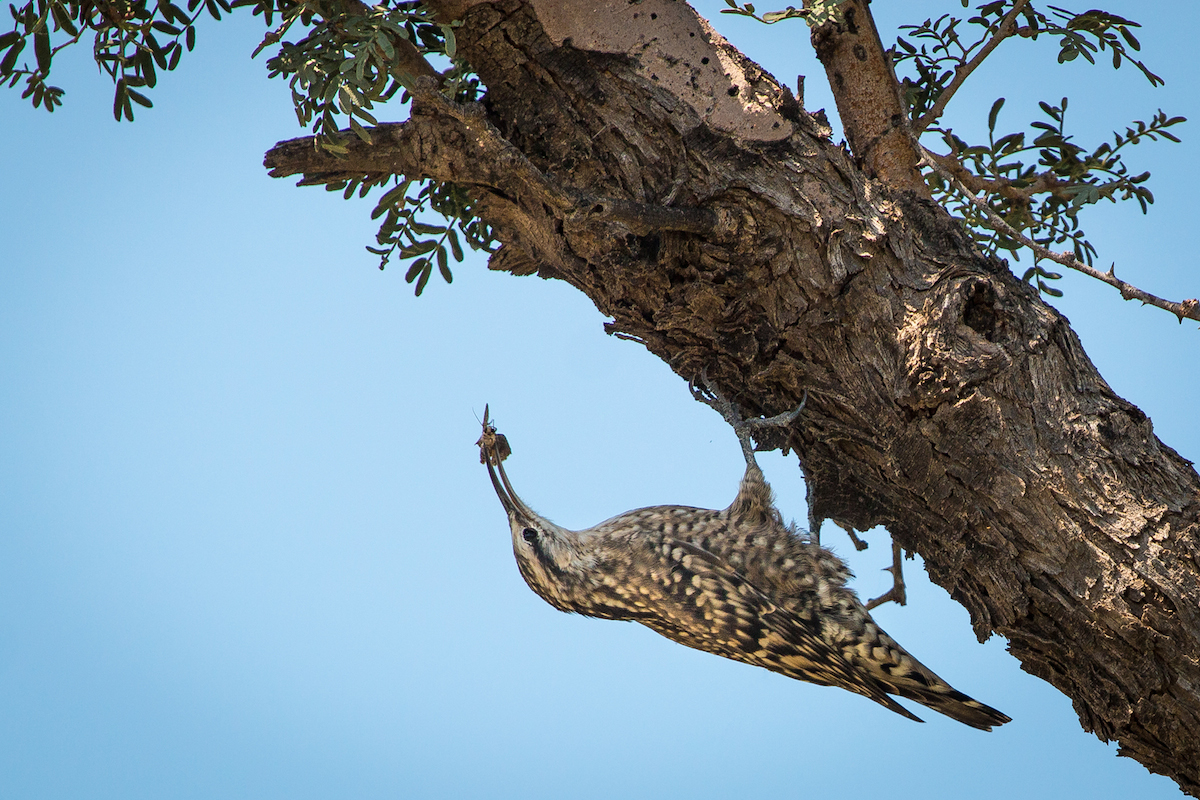
Feeding behaviour of the spotted creeper

The species is found singly or in mixed species flocks, foraging on the trunks of trees. It has an undulating flight and moves up the trunk, starting off from near the base, sometimes on horizontal branches. When flying down to the base of a tree, it has the clumsy appearance of a quail landing in grass. They resemble nuthatches in the way they work up and down the trunk and do not work in the spiral manner of treecreepers. The tail is held away and sometimes clings upside down. They feed on small insects and spiders on the bark.

Their calls are a series of rising tui-tui-tui notes and the song is a plaintive series of whistled notes tsip-tsee tuu tuui-tuwee having the quality of that of sunbird.

The breeding season is February to May. The nest is a cup made of roots and stalks placed at the junction of a horizontal branch and the vertical trunk, often near a knot or other outgrowth that makes it very difficult to spot. The nest walls are pliant and soft but strong. The surface is decorated with spider webs, caterpillar frass and lichen. The inner lining is made from spider webs and other fine material. The usual clutch consists of two eggs, which are greenish or gray, spotted darker brown and blotched pale. The female alone incubates the eggs and is fed by the male with which it keeps in contact with a twittering call. Both parents take part in feeding the chicks.

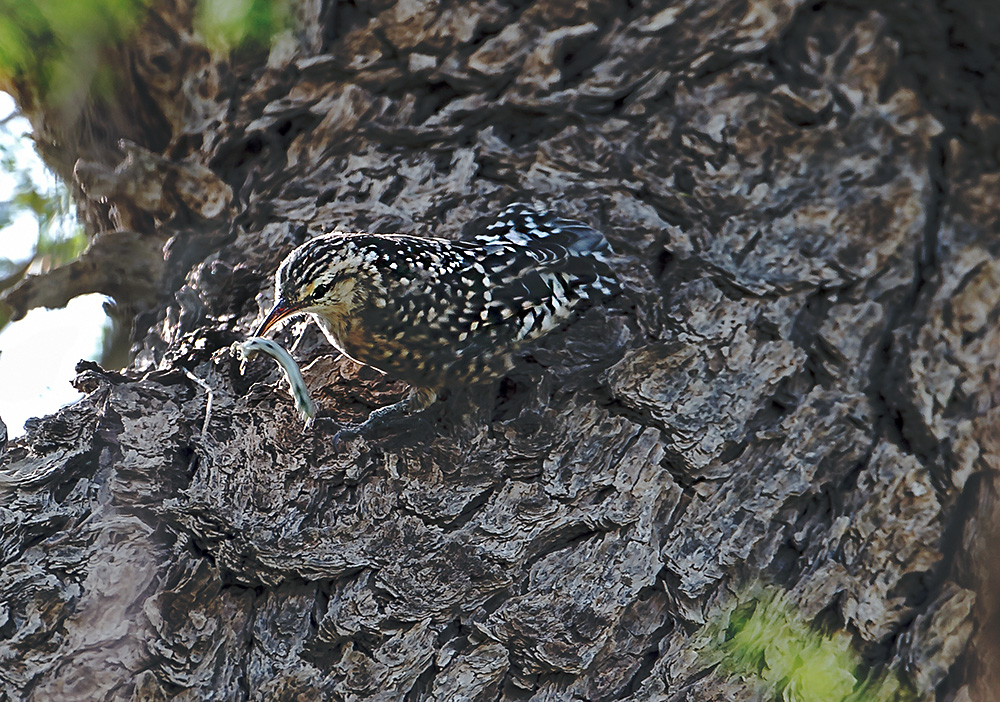
In Rajasthan

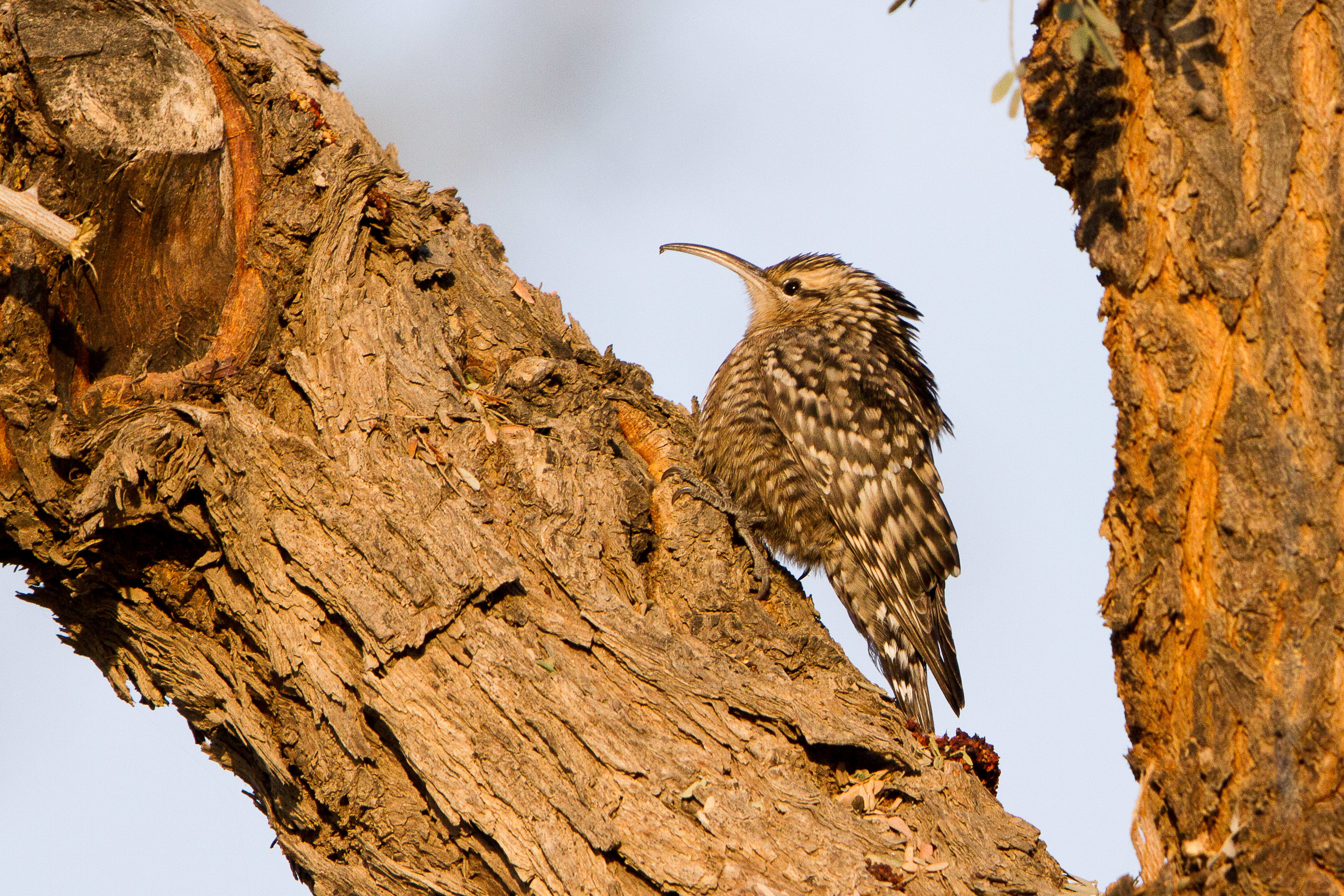
Basking in the morning
