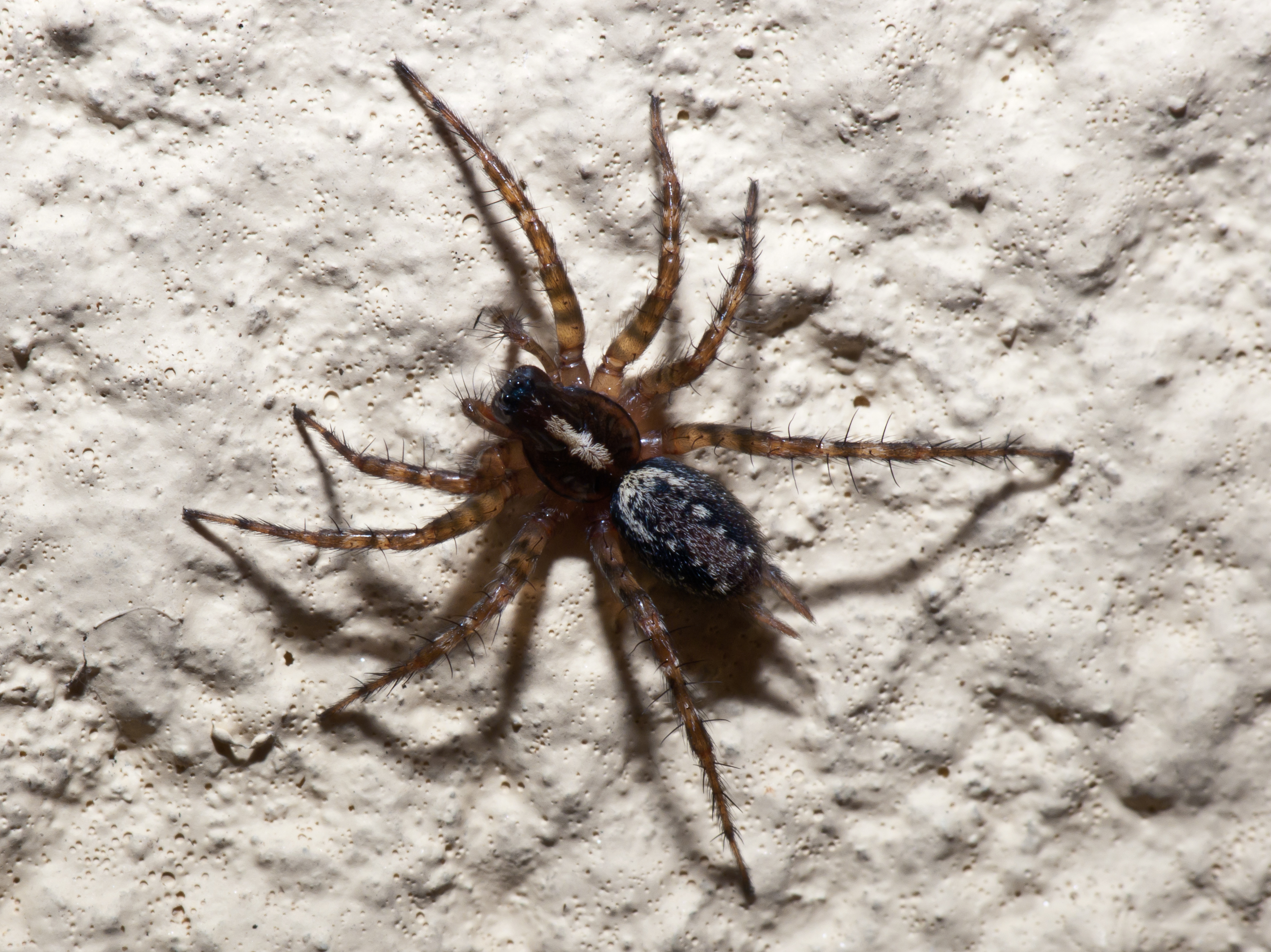
- Textrix dendiculata

Scientific classification
- Kingdom: Animalia
- Phylum: Arthropoda
- Subphylum: Chelicerata
- Class: Arachnida
- Order: Araneae
- Infraorder: Araneomorphae
- Family: Agelenidae
- Genus: Textrix; Sundevall, 1833

Type species
- T. denticulata (Olivier, 1789)

Species
- 6, see text

= Textrix =

Genus of spiders

Textrix is a genus of funnel weavers first described by Carl Jakob Sundevall in 1833. They have a mainly European distribution, with one species in Ethiopia. The type species of the genus is Textrix denticulata.

The spiders in the genus Textrix have a strongly recurved posterior row of eyes with the medial eyes larger than the lateral eyes. They have a narrow head which is distinct from the thorax. These spiders may resemble wolf spiders as they are often recorded running about in sunshine, but their long and segmented posterior spinners are very marked and identify them as funnel web weavers.

== Species ==
As of October 2026 it contains six species:

- Textrix caudata L. Koch, 1872 – Macaronesia, Northern Africa, Southern Europe, Syria
- Textrix chyzeri de Blauwe, 1980 – Hungary, Croatia, Bosnia and Herzegovina, Montenegro, Bulgaria
- Textrix denticulata (Olivier, 1789) (type) – Europe, Turkey
- Textrix nigromarginata Strand, 1906 – Ethiopia
- Textrix pinicola Simon, 1875 – Portugal to Italy
- Textrix rubrofoliata Pesarini, 1990 – Spain, France, Italy
