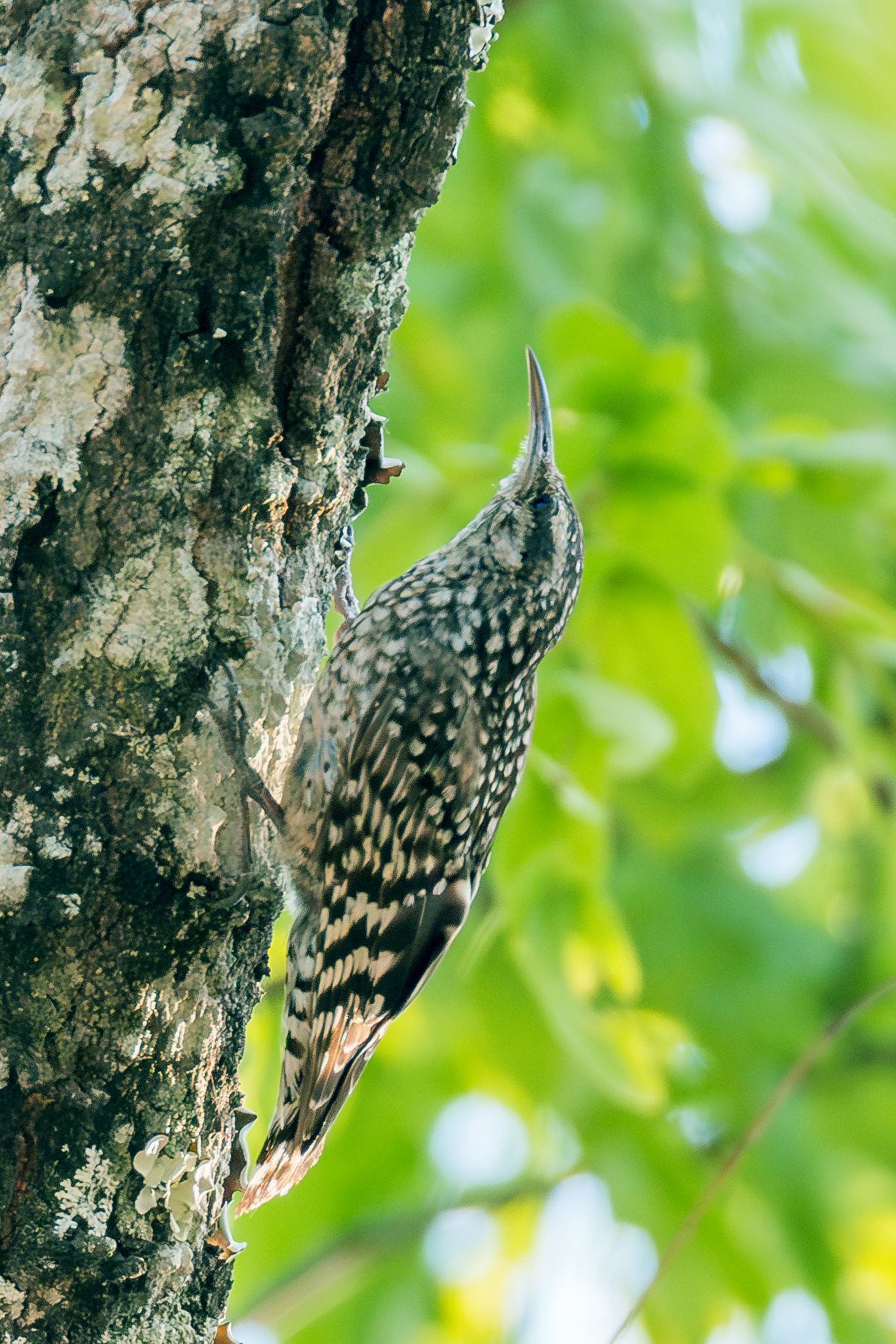
- Nominate S. s. salvadori near Lilongwe, Malawi

Conservation status
- Least Concern (IUCN 3.1)

Scientific classification
- Kingdom: Animalia
- Phylum: Chordata
- Class: Aves
- Order: Passeriformes
- Family: Salpornithidae
- Genus: Salpornis
- Species: S. salvadori

Binomial name
- Salpornis salvadori (Bocage, 1878)

= African spotted creeper =

Species of bird

The African spotted creeper (Salpornis salvadori) is a small passerine bird in the family Salpornithidae. It is found in subsaharan Africa in open deciduous forest and mango groves. It does not migrate other than local movements.

The African spotted creeper has strongly spotted and barred plumage, closely similar to the Indian spotted creeper, but clearly different from the treecreepers in the genus Certhia. It weighs up to 16 grams (0.56 oz), twice as much as treecreepers of similar length [up to 15 cm (5.9 in)].

The African spotted creeper has a long, thin, pointed down-curved bill, which it uses to extricate insects from bark, but it lacks the stiff tail feathers which the Certhia treecreepers use to support themselves on vertical trees.

== Taxonomy and subspecies ==
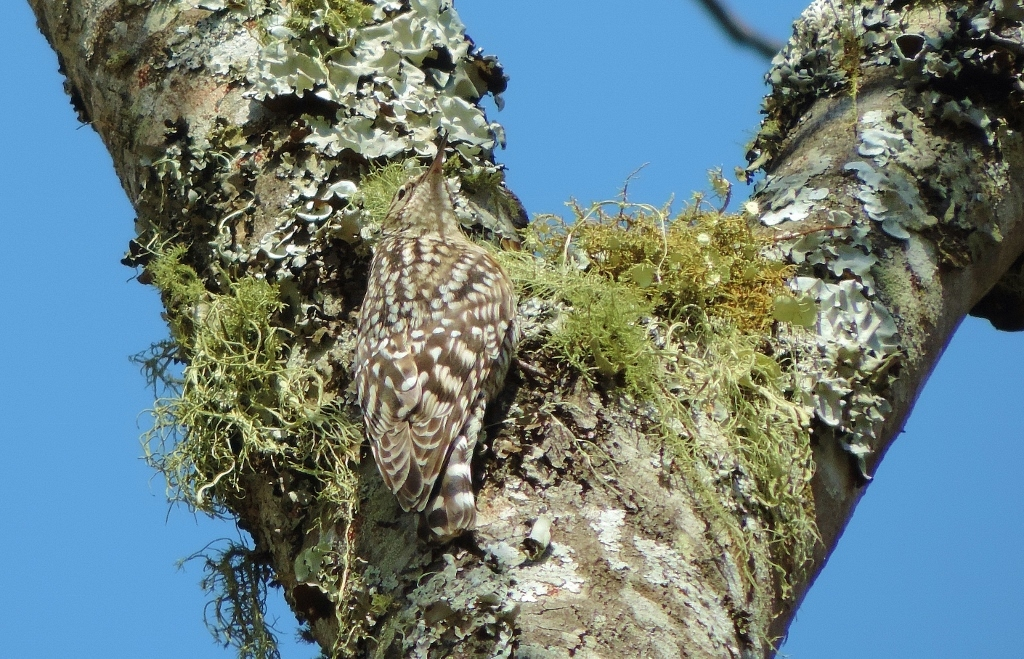
S. s. xylodromus at Marondera, Zimbabwe

This species and the Indian spotted creeper were formerly considered conspecific and called the spotted creeper. Four distinct subspecies are accepted within the distribution of the African spotted creeper, listed from northwest to southeast:

- S. s. emini Hartlaub, 1884 – western Africa including Guinea, Sierra Leone, Nigeria, to Cameroon and Chad in the east.
- S. s. erlangeri Neumann, 1907 – restricted to the Ethiopian highlands.
- S. s. salvadori Bocage, 1878 – eastern Uganda, western Kenya, Tanzania, Malawi and Mozambique.
- S. s. xylodromus Clancey, 1975 – the Zambezi Escarpment, Mashonaland Plateau and adjoining Mozambique.

== Ecology ==
Its nests and eggs are quite different from those of treecreepers. The nest is a cup placed on a horizontal branch, usually in a crotch, and camouflaged with spiders' egg sacs, caterpillar frass, and lichen. The clutch is usually of three eggs, which are blue or greenish, marked with grey, lavender, and brown.
