= The Birds of Africa =

- Author: C. Hilary Fry, Stuart Keith, Emil Urban
- Illustrator: Martin Woodcock
- Publisher: Academic Press
- Publication date: 1982 - 2013

"The Birds of Africa" is also a five-volume handbook by George Ernest Shelley, published 1896-1912.

The Birds of Africa is an eight-volume ornithological handbook. Its authors/editors are C. Hilary Fry, Stuart Keith and Emil Urban, and Claude Chappuis is sound editor. Each volume contains colour plates painted by Martin Woodcock. The series ended with the 8th volume in 2013 and shortly after in August 2014 publisher Academic Press confirmed that they would no longer be reprinting the first 7 volumes.

== Content ==
It covers all breeding species in full, with details of range, status, description, voice, general habits and breeding; non-breeding visitors are treated more briefly, with emphasis on their status and behaviour whilst in Africa. The first 3 volumes refer to non passerine birds, 4, 5, 6, and 7 refer to passerine, and the 8th and final volume refers to the birds of and relating to Madagascar specifically.

== Volumes ==
The series contained the following volumes:

1. Ostriches to Falcons, published in 1982 521 pp.
2. Gamebirds to Pigeons, published in 1986 552 pp. + 32 color plates
3. Parrots to Woodpeckers, published in 1988 611 pp. + 32 color plates
4. Broadbills to Chats, published in 1992 609 pp. + 32 color plates
5. Thrushes to Puffback Flycatchers, published in 1997 669 pp. + 32 color plates
6. Picathartes to Oxpeckers, published in 2000 724 pp. + 36 color plates
7. Sparrows to Buntings, published in 2004 666 pp.
8. The Malagasy Region, published 2013 1024 pp.
