= International Bioacoustics Society =

Council for the field of bioacoustics

- Abbreviation: IBAC
- Formation: Århus, Denmark, 1969
- Headquarters: British Library Sound Archive, London, United Kingdom
- Region served: Worldwide
- Website: International Bioacoustics Council

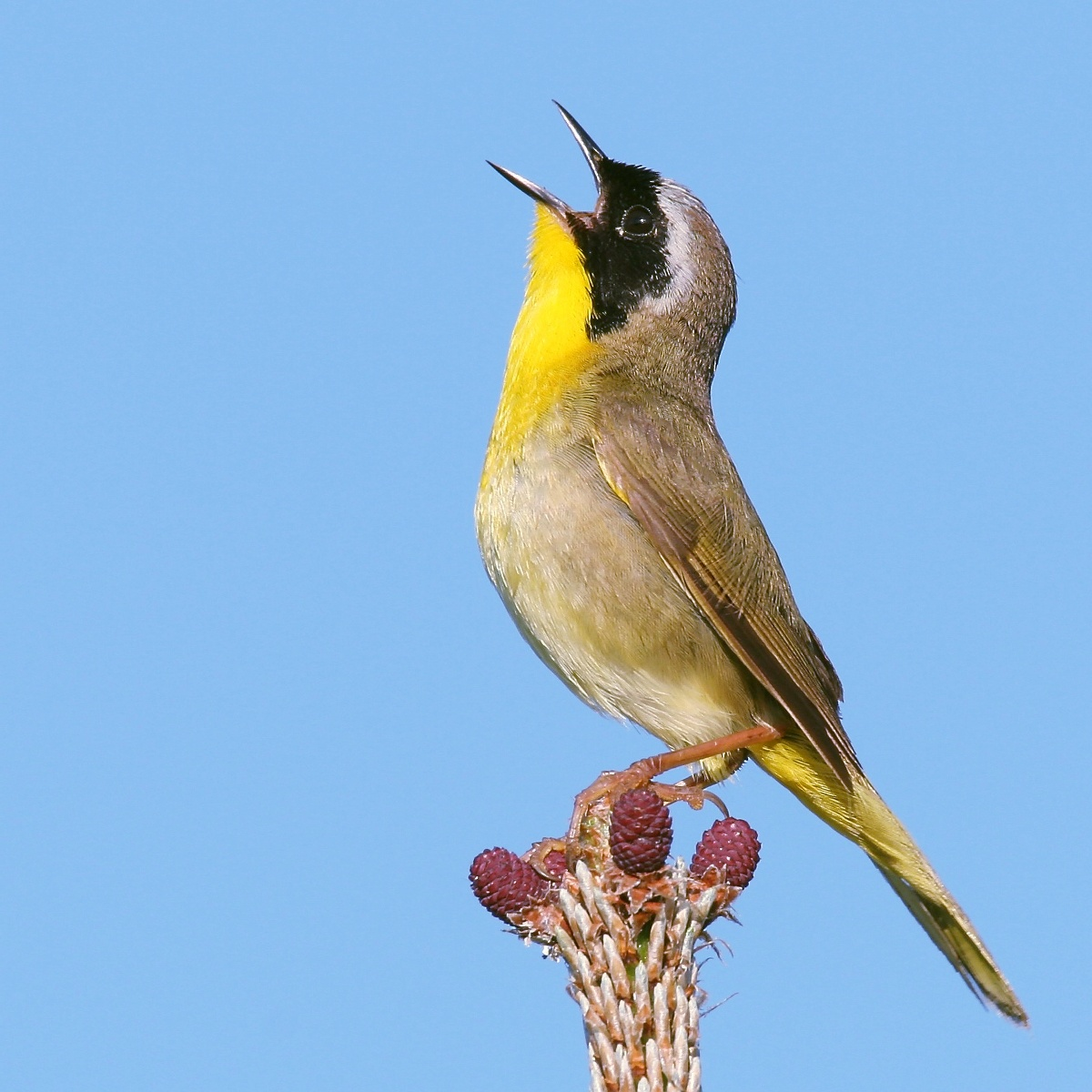
Singing male Common Yellowthroat

The International Bioacoustics Society (IBAC), formerly known as the International Bioacoustics Council, was founded in 1969 to encourage international participation throughout the field of bioacoustics. Given its multidisciplinary nature, IBAC aims to bring together biologists from different specialisms. as well as engineers, sound archivists, computer scientists and other interested parties to foster discussion, share knowledge and exchange ideas surrounding the subject of vocal communication in animals.

== History ==
IBAC emerged from earlier initiatives such as the International Committee for Bioacoustics (ICBA) which was formed in the USA in 1956. This short-lived organisation was replaced by the Enregistrements et Etudes des Chants et Cris d'Oiseaux (Institute ECHO) which was founded in France by Jean-Claude and Helen Roché in 1967. The primary aims of Institute ECHO were to make and publish wildlife sound recordings, organise research meetings and conferences, promote the scientific and musicological study of wildlife sounds and mount scientific expeditions. In 1969, Institute ECHO abandoned its scientific activities in order to concentrate on its publishing programme. In response to this change in focus, members interested in the scientific study of wildlife sounds decided to form IBAC

== IBAC aims ==
The rules of IBAC state the following core purposes:

- To further the science of bioacoustics by the holding of congresses and by setting up task forces to examine specialist areas.
- To encourage and effect liaison between amateurs and professionals working in bioacoustics.
- To encourage students to take part in IBAC's activities.

== IBAC activities ==
IBAC supports the sharing of recent research outputs and technological advancements through its biennial conferences, a list serve, a Facebook group and a website.

From 1971 to 1983 IBAC published Biophon, an informal journal which featured scientific articles, equipment reviews and information on forthcoming bioacoustics events. Issued three times a year, the journal was edited by Dr Poul Bondesen who was a curator at the Naturhistorisk Museum at Aarhus University. Members of the editorial board included Patrick J. Sellar, Jeffery Boswall, Claude Chappuis, Carl Weismann, Sten Wahlstrom and Joan Hall-Craggs.

Two special issues were published in 1996 and 1997. A complete set of the journal is available for consultation at the British Library.

== Conferences ==
Since its formation in 1969, IBAC has held 29 conferences in 14 different countries. The first conference was held in Kinross, Scotland in 1971. The first IBAC conference to occur outside Europe was held at the Center for Bioacoustics at Texas A&M University in October 1997. Other locations have included Brazil (2003) and Japan (2023). The last conference to date was held in September 2025 in Kerteminde, Denmark.
