= Ornithological handbook =

An ornithological handbook is a book (or series of books) giving summarised information either about the birds of a particular geographical area or a particular taxonomic group of birds. Some handbooks cover many aspects of their subjects' biology, whereas others focus on specific topics, particularly identification.

== List of ornithological handbooks with a worldwide scope ==
- Handbook of the Birds of the World
- The Bird families of the world series
- The Helm Identification Guides series

== List of ornithological handbooks with a geographic scope ==
- The Birds of Africa
- The Birds of the Malay Peninsula
- Birds of North America
- The Birds of South America
- Birds of South Asia. The Ripley Guide
- Birds of the Western Palearctic
- Handbook of Western Palearctic Birds: Passerines: A Photographic Guide (Christopher Helm Publishers Ltd, 2018)
- Handbook of Australian, New Zealand and Antarctic Birds, the standard text of Australian ornithology, abbreviated as HANZAB
- Birds of Western Australia, the handbook by Serventy and Whittell, published in 1948 through five editions.
