= Karel Voous =

Dutch ornithologist

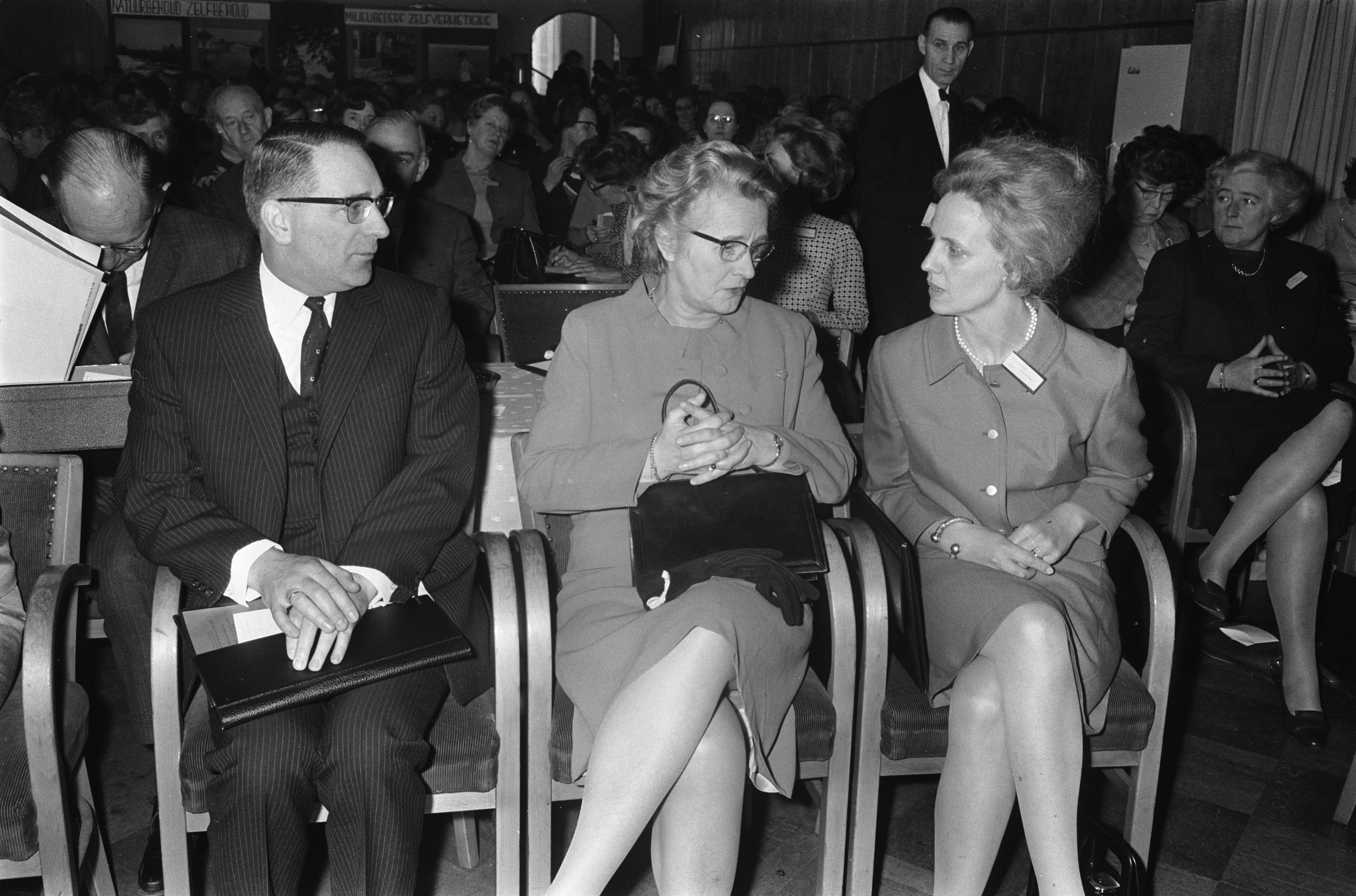
Voous (left, 1970)

Karel Hendrik Voous (23 June 1920 in Huizen – 31 January 2002 in Huizen) was a Dutch ornithologist and author.

He was Secretary-General (1966–1970) and Honorary President (1990–1994) of the International Ornithological Committee.

== Bibliography ==
=== Books in English ===
- On the history of the distribution of the genus Dendrocopos (1947)
- Birds observed and collected during the whaling expeditions of the "Willem Barendsz" in the Antarctic, 1946–1947 and 1947–1948 (1950)
- Owls of the Northern Hemisphere
- List of Recent Holarctic Bird Species

==== Contributions ====
- The EBCC Atlas of European Breeding Birds, T & A D Poyser, 1997 ISBN 0-85661-091-7 (foreword)

=== Books in Dutch ===
- Afwijkende populatie koolmezen
- Phylloscopus Bonelli Bonelli in Nederland Gevangen
- Roofvogels en Uilen van Europa
