= Western Palaearctic =

Section of the Palearctic biogeographic realm

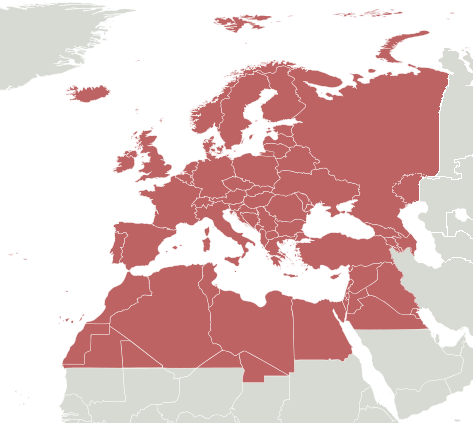
Boundaries in The Birds of the Western Palearctic

The Western Palaearctic or Western Palearctic is part of the Palaearctic realm, one of the eight biogeographic realms dividing the Earth's surface. Because of its size, the Palaearctic is often divided for convenience into two, with Europe, North Africa, northern and central parts of the Arabian Peninsula, and part of temperate Asia, roughly to the Ural Mountains forming the western zone, and the rest of temperate Asia becoming the Eastern Palaearctic. Its exact boundaries differ depending on the authority in question, but the Handbook of the Birds of Europe, the Middle East, and North Africa: The Birds of the Western Palearctic (BWP) definition is widely used, and is followed by the most popular Western Palearctic checklist, that of the Association of European Rarities Committees (AERC). The Western Palearctic realm includes mostly boreal and temperate climate ecoregions.

The Palaearctic region has been recognised as a natural zoogeographic region since Sclater proposed it in 1858. The oceans to the north and west, and the Sahara to the south are obvious natural boundaries with other realms, but the eastern boundary is more arbitrary, since it merges into another part of the same realm, and the mountain ranges used as markers are less effective biogeographic separators. The climate differences across the Western Palearctic region can cause behavioural differences within the same species across geographical distance, such as in the sociality of behaviour for bees of the species Lasioglossum malachurum.
