= Druridge Bay curlew =

Bird

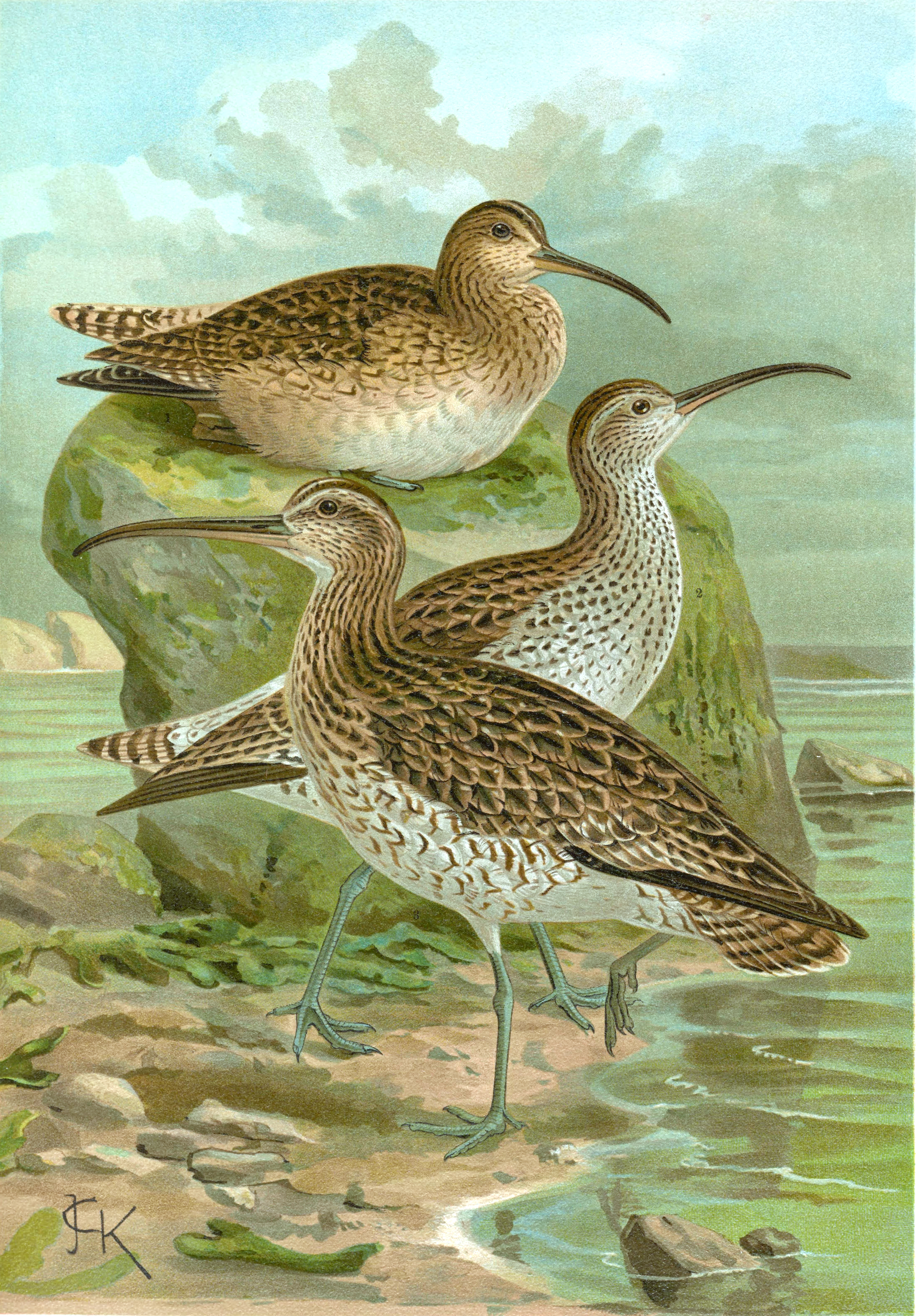
Slender-billed curlew (centre), flanked by two Eurasian whimbrels

The Druridge Bay curlew was a curlew that was present in Druridge Bay, Northumberland in May 1998, whose species identification proved to be controversial. The bird was identified by its finder, and most others who saw it, as a first-summer slender-billed curlew, one of the rarest birds in the world; however, this identification provoked scepticism from experts. The bird was initially accepted as this species (and therefore became the first record of slender-billed curlew in Britain) by the British Birds Rarities Committee and the British Ornithologists’ Union Records Committee - however, this identification was eventually rejected in 2013 (Collinson et al. 2014)

== Discovery ==
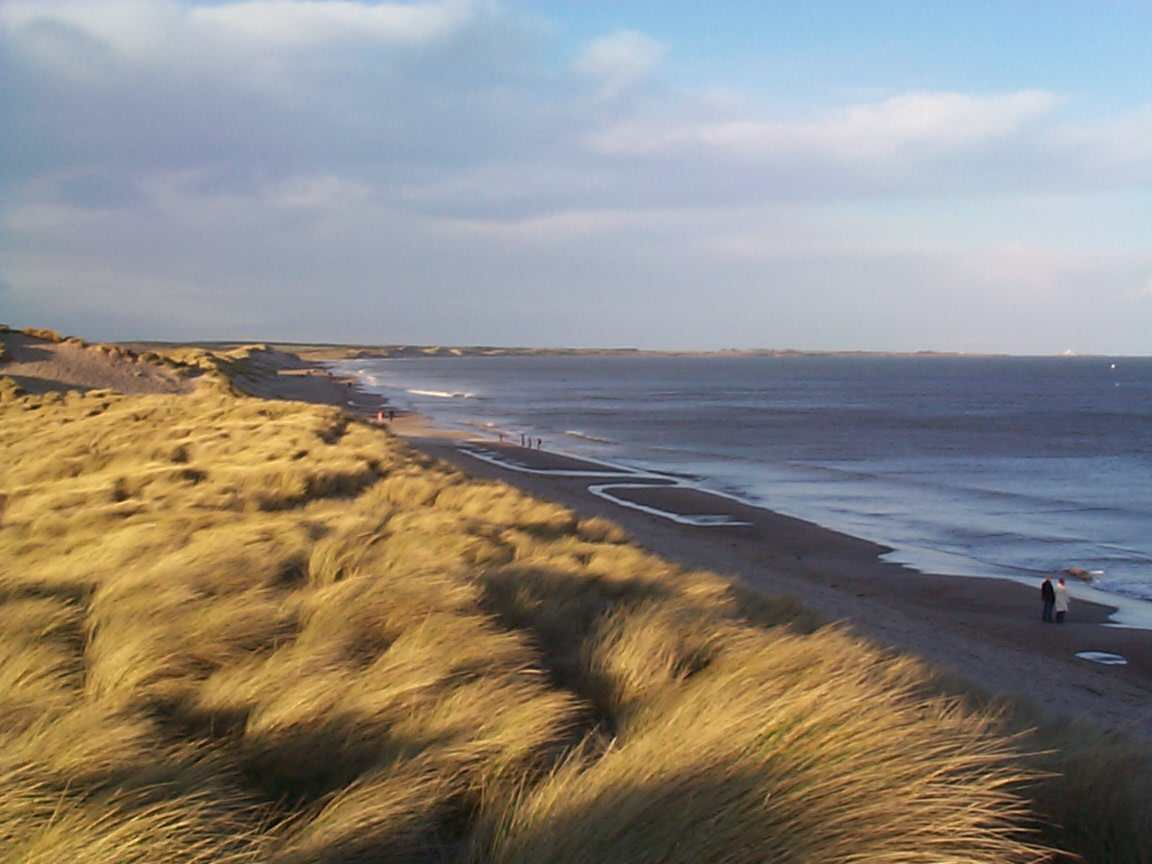
Druridge Bay, Northumberland, where the curlew was sighted

The bird in question was found by an unknown birdwatcher on Monday 4 May 1998 and was first identified as a whimbrel. The birder reported the whimbrel to Tim Cleeves who, uncertain of the bird's identification, contacted a number of other birdwatchers from the Northumberland and Tyneside areas and asked them to come to Druridge to give an opinion. The bird was watched by six observers until 20.50 hours that evening.

News of the bird was broadcast on the national rare bird information services. As, at this stage, there was not a consensus on the identity of the bird, some of the services used cautious language, e.g. Birdline referred to the bird as a "controversial curlew thought by some observers to be a Slender-billed". Because of the uncertainty over the identity, some birders chose not to travel to see it, although many others did. The bird was last seen on Thursday 7 May. It was photographed (albeit distantly) and three video recordings were made.

Although the identification of this bird is generally credited to Tim Cleeves, Brett Richards (Birdwatch 118:11) has claimed that a large part of the credit for the record should rest with him, due to his role in persuading others to travel to see the bird.

== Comparison to Eurasian curlew ==
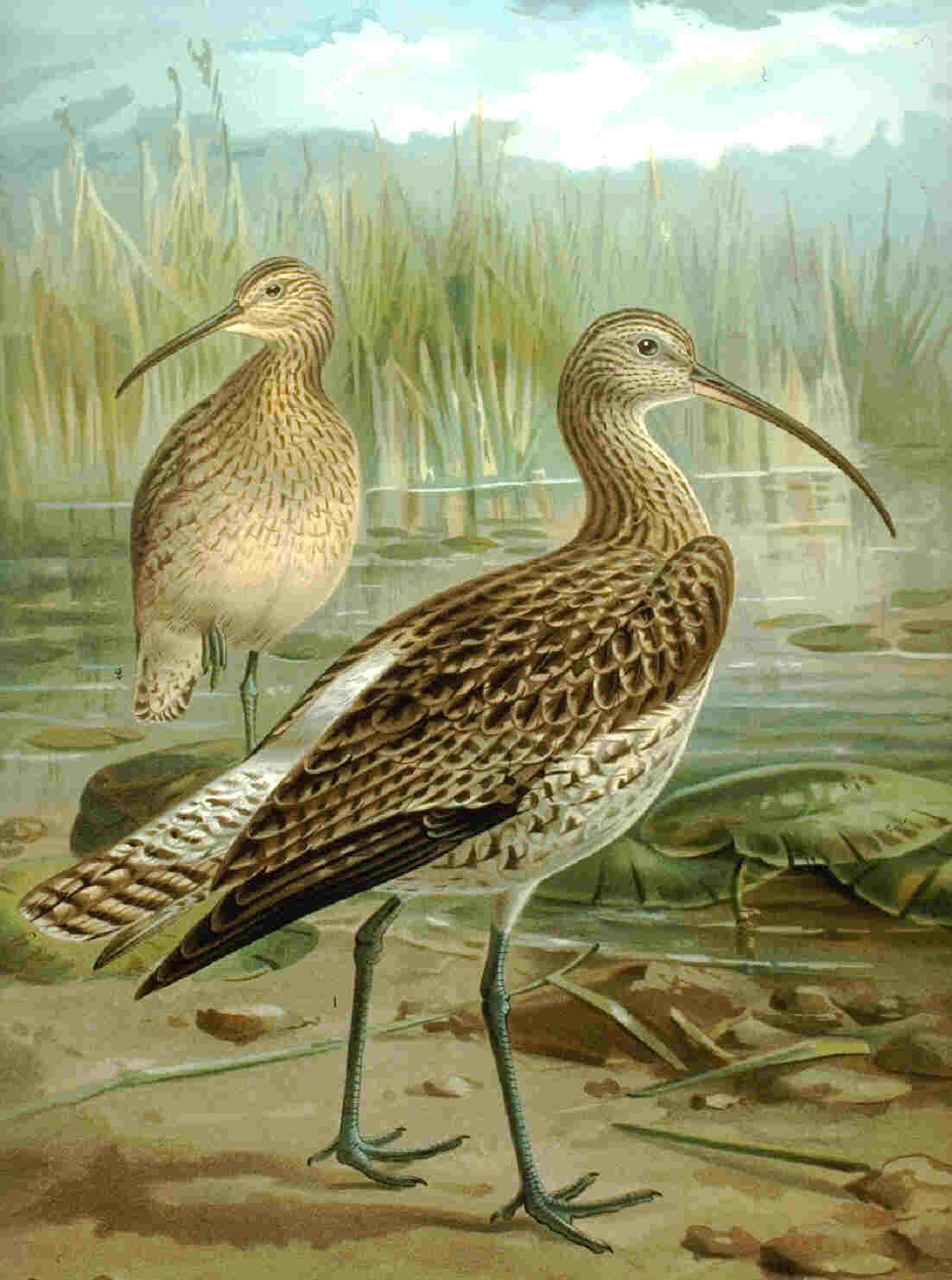
Eurasian curlew

The bird was close in appearance to Eurasian curlew, but differed in a number of features:

- in size, it was closer to a whimbrel than to a typical Eurasian curlew
- it also differed slightly in structure, being slimmer, and in particular thinner-necked and shorter-legged than a typical Eurasian curlew
- its bill was shorter than is typical for Eurasian curlew, and straight for the first half of its length, rather than evenly curved; the bill was also thin and narrow in both depth and width
- the bird's flanks were clean white, patterned with rows of oval black spots, and lacked any transverse barring or anchor-shaped marks
- it had a very white-looking tail, with narrow greyish bars
- its underwings were white and unmarked

One other point of note is that the bird's upperwing-coverts were worn, and they had a silvery appearance, contrasting with its scapular feathers which were very dark.

== Debate ==
Public discussion of the bird first surfaced on 6 May, on the UKBirdnet mailing list, which at that time was the main internet discussion forum for British birders. Early postings from Phil Hansbro (based on a conversation with Brett Richards, who had been to see the bird) and from Ian Broadbent made a strong case for the identification as Slender-billed Curlew. Other observers raised questions, with three aspects causing concern:

1. the global rarity of the species and the likelihood of its occurrence in Britain
2. the fact that it showed a quite different appearance from the well-watched slender-billed curlews at Merja Zerga in Morocco in the late 1980s/early 1990s, and
3. whether all possible alternative identifications (e.g. an aberrant Eurasian curlew or a hybrid) had been ruled out.

In mid-June, Birding World published an account of the bird, written by Tim Cleeves, his first public statement on the bird. The article dealt in detail with the circumstances of the bird's finding, its appearance, his reasons for making a confident identification of the bird as a slender-billed curlew, ageing and sexing of slender-billed curlews, their conservation status and likelihood of vagrancy. The article was accompanied by an editorial comment endorsing Cleeves's views. Cleeves also wrote a short account for the July edition of Birdwatch magazine.

These two articles prompted letters from Chris Heard outlining reasons why he believed that the case for identification of the bird as a slender-billed curlew was not proven. In his letter to Birding World, Heard made comparisons with the Merja Zerga birds, which he had seen, and listed the following concerns:

1. that the bill, while short and slim, was not correctly shaped, being too straight, and that short-billed Eurasian curlews do exist
2. that the Druridge curlew's head was not small and rounded, while its back was too rounded
3. that the bird lacked a well-marked supercilium, and did not show the dark-capped appearance typical of slender-billed curlew, and
4. that the bird did not show an eye-ring.

An editorial comment was published in reply to this letter, which included comments made by a number of the observers involved with the Druridge bird. A letter to Birdwatch from Chris Heard outlined the same concerns, and pointed out also that Eurasian curlews can show spotted flank patterning and white underwings. This letter drew a response from Brett Richards.

The editorial comment in Birding World (to which Brett Richards contributed), and Richards' letter in Birdwatch, responded to Chris Heard's concerns by making the following points:

1. that slender-billed curlew's bill shape is likely to vary, as does that of Eurasian curlew and whimbrel
2. that the Druridge bird's head-shape did appear at times to be correct
3. that the back shape of slender-billed curlew varies depending on what the bird is doing, and so did that of the Druridge bird
4. that first-summer slender-billed curlews may not have eye-rings, or that the strength of this feature may vary between individuals, and that in fact the Druridge bird did have an eye-ring, albeit not as prominent as the Merja Zerga birds.

== BBRC/BOURC acceptance ==
The bird was accepted as the first record of slender-billed curlew for Britain by the British Ornithologists Union Records Committee and this was announced in a joint BBRC/BOURC press release on 24 January 2002.

This was followed by the publication in British Birds of an account by Tim Cleeves of the finding of the bird, and a summary of the BBRC analysis of submitted descriptions, photographs and video footage, written by Jimmy Steele and Didier Vangeluwe.

Opinions on the exact identity of the bird remain divided — the conclusion arrived at by BBRC and BOURC is shared by a significant majority of the British birding community, but a number of British and foreign birders are not convinced that the bird was a slender-billed curlew, including several high-profile figures. A first-winter curlew at Minsmere, Suffolk in October 2004, and an identification article by Andrea Corso (et al. 2014) re-opened the debate on the identity of the Druridge bird. In 2013, slender-billed curlew was removed from the British List following a review of the Druridge Bay record by the BBRC and BOURC.

== The August 2002 Druridge bird ==
On 9–10 August 2002, and possibly for a few days before that, another bird showing characteristics of slender-billed curlew was reported from Druridge Bay. This bird was described as being 25% smaller than Eurasian curlew with a slender bill tapering to a narrow point, with black spotting on its flanks, and unmarked white underwings. This bird was not photographed, and only seen by a small number of observers, and no formal submission was made to the Rarities Committee.

== The Minsmere curlew ==
In October 2004, another bird showing some characteristics consistent with slender-billed curlew, was found, this time at RSPB Minsmere in Suffolk. This bird generated considerable debate, with some observers, including Didier Vangeluwe, who had travelled from Belgium to see the bird, stating that they believed it to be a slender-billed curlew. However, by the time this bird was last seen, most observers had formed the opinion that this bird was a first-winter Eurasian curlew.

The discussion about this bird's identity reopened the debate about the Druridge bird.
