= Druridge Bay =

Coastal feature in Northumberland, England

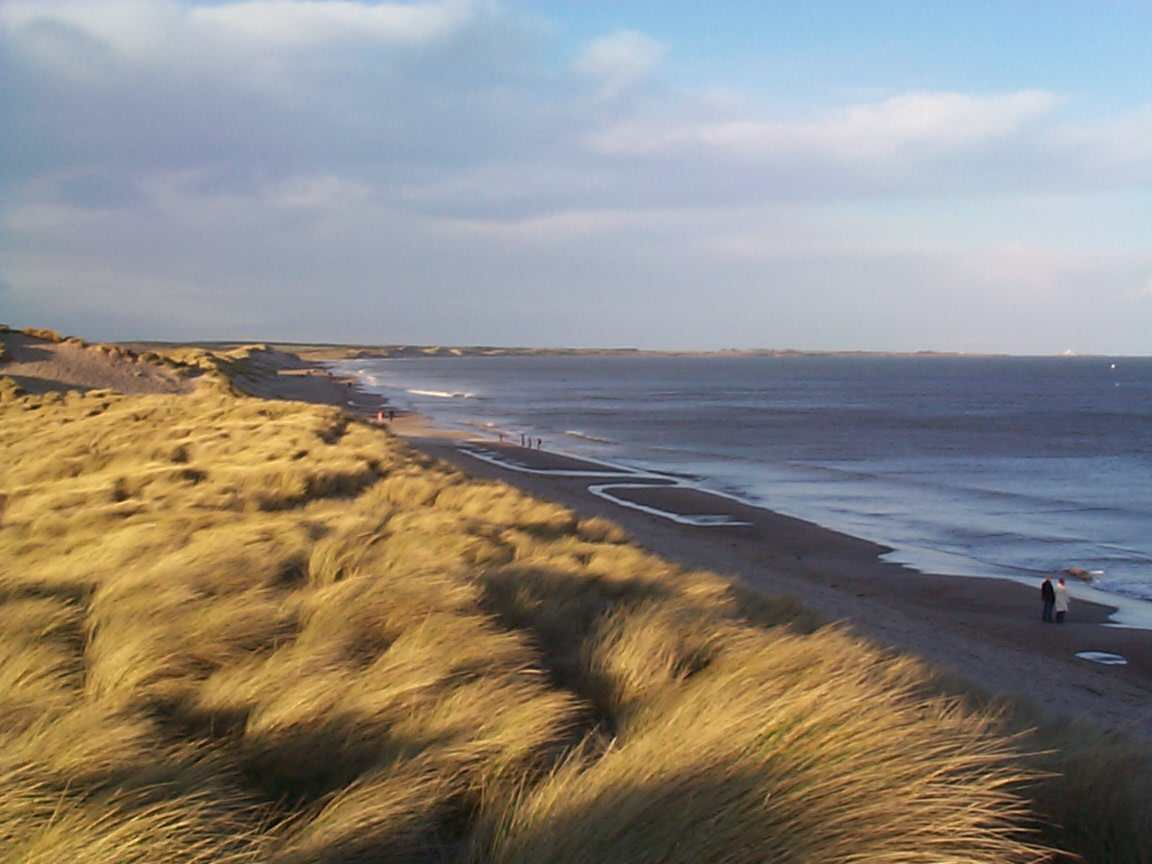
- Druridge Bay

- Location in Northumberland
- Location: Northumberland, England, UK; NZ276984
- Coordinates: 55.279°N 1.56708°W

Druridge Bay is a 7-mile (11 km) long bay on the North Sea in Northumberland, England, stretching from Amble in the north to Cresswell in the south.

Druridge Bay Country Park is situated on the bay, and part of the bay (the section near the farmstead of Druridge, in the centre of the bay) is owned by the National Trust. Coastal areas on the bay are set aside as nature reserves.

== Wartime defences ==
During World War II, defences were constructed around Druridge Bay as part of the anti-invasion preparations. The defences included scaffolding barriers and anti-tank blocks overlooked by pillboxes; behind these were minefields and an anti-tank ditch.

Between the hamlets of Druridge and Cresswell, anti-glider ditches were dug and there is an extant brick-built decoy control.

== Proposed nuclear reactor ==
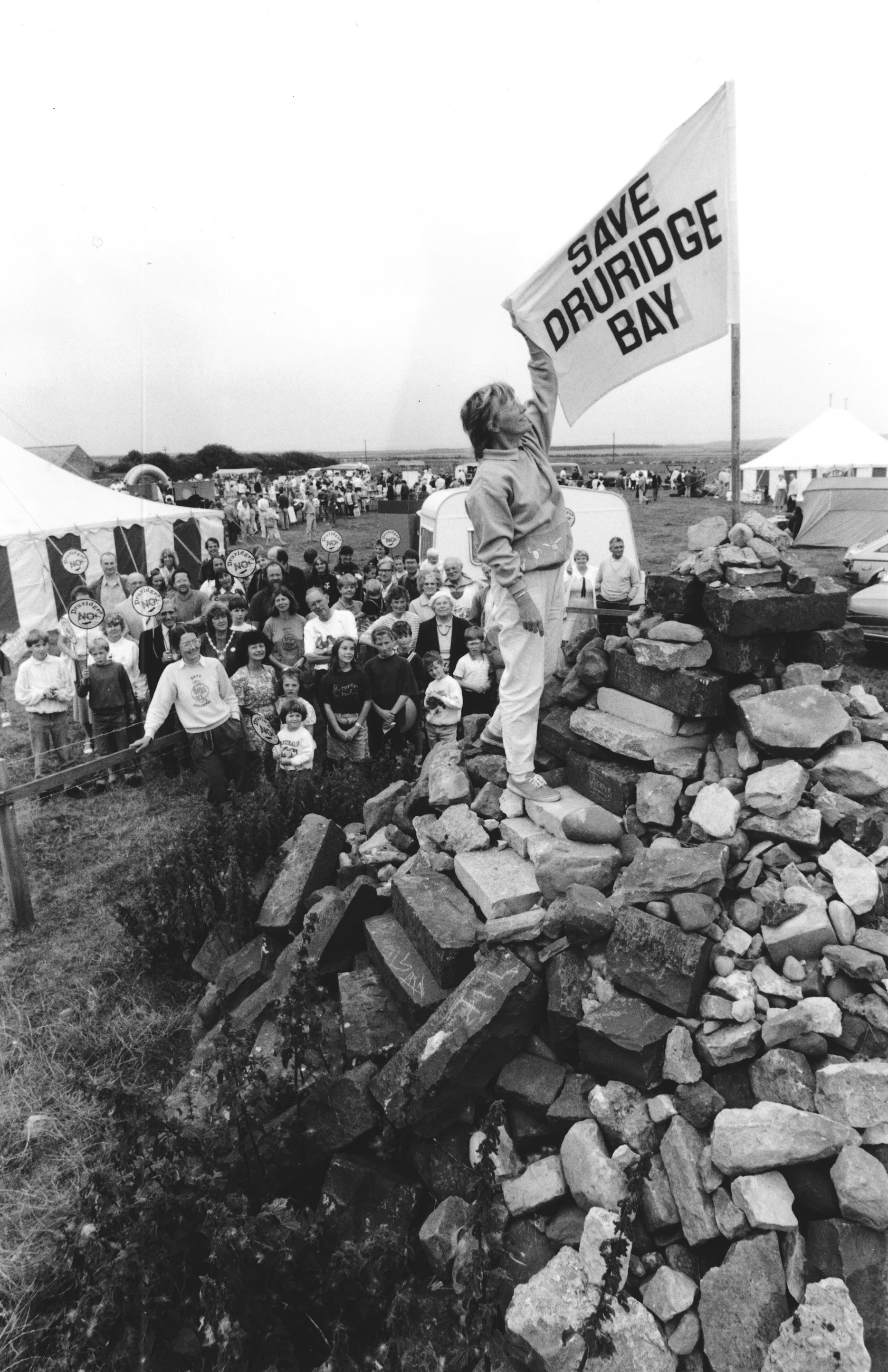
Protest against proposed new nuclear power station at the Bay

The bay was the focus of a long-running campaign against proposals to construct a Pressurised Water Reactor nuclear power station during the 1980s and for the large-scale extraction of sand from the area in the 1990s. The first campaign, along with changes in UK Government policy on nuclear power, prevented the power station from being built: the plan was shelved in 1989.

The land was retained by Nuclear Electric and in February 1996 was allocated to the NDA/BNFL. In November 1996 the NDA/BNFL sold the land to farmers.

== Proposed coal mine ==
Druridge Bay again became the focus for environmental concerns in late 2015, when a planning application was submitted by Banks Group for an open-cast mine extending to 360 hectares (900 acres) immediately to the west of the beach, for the extraction of 3 million tonnes of coal. Six weeks after the application was submitted the UK government announced that all coal-fired energy generation would cease by 2025. Over 1800 letters of objection were received. Northumberland County Council approved plans for the open-cast mine in July 2016. In September 2016, the plans were put on hold subject to a government inquiry. In March 2018, the proposal was formally rejected by the Communities Secretary Sajid Javid. The company behind the project said they were planning to formally challenge the decision in the High Court. In September 2020, the proposal was rejected again by the Secretary of State.

== Wildlife ==
Northumberland Wildlife Trust purchased the sand extraction site from RMC Group in 2006. The shore is known for populations of birds including the golden plover and the purple sandpiper.

Druridge Bay is best known to birdwatchers for hosting, in 1998, the Druridge Bay curlew, a controversial bird which was eventually accepted as the first record of a slender-billed curlew in Britain, although this identification is still disputed by some.

== Naturism ==
Druridge Bay is also used by naturists. The North East Skinny Dip, first held in 2012, is an annual event to raise funds for MIND, the mental health charity. It is held around the time of the Autumn Equinox in late September each year.

== Culture ==
Music

The Divine Comedy's 1994 album Promenade begins with a field recording of the waves breaking on the shore at Druridge Bay, recorded especially for the album by producer Darren Allison.

== Gallery ==
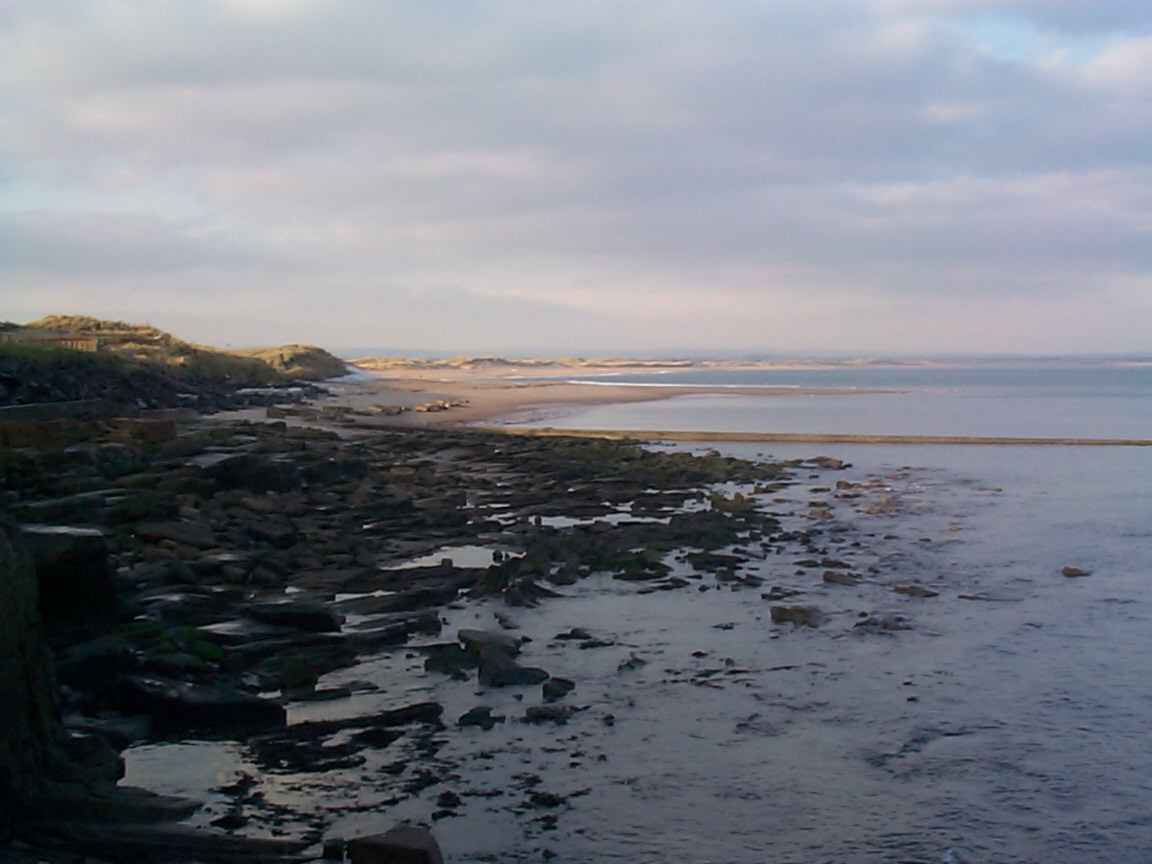
Looking north over Druridge Bay from Cresswell

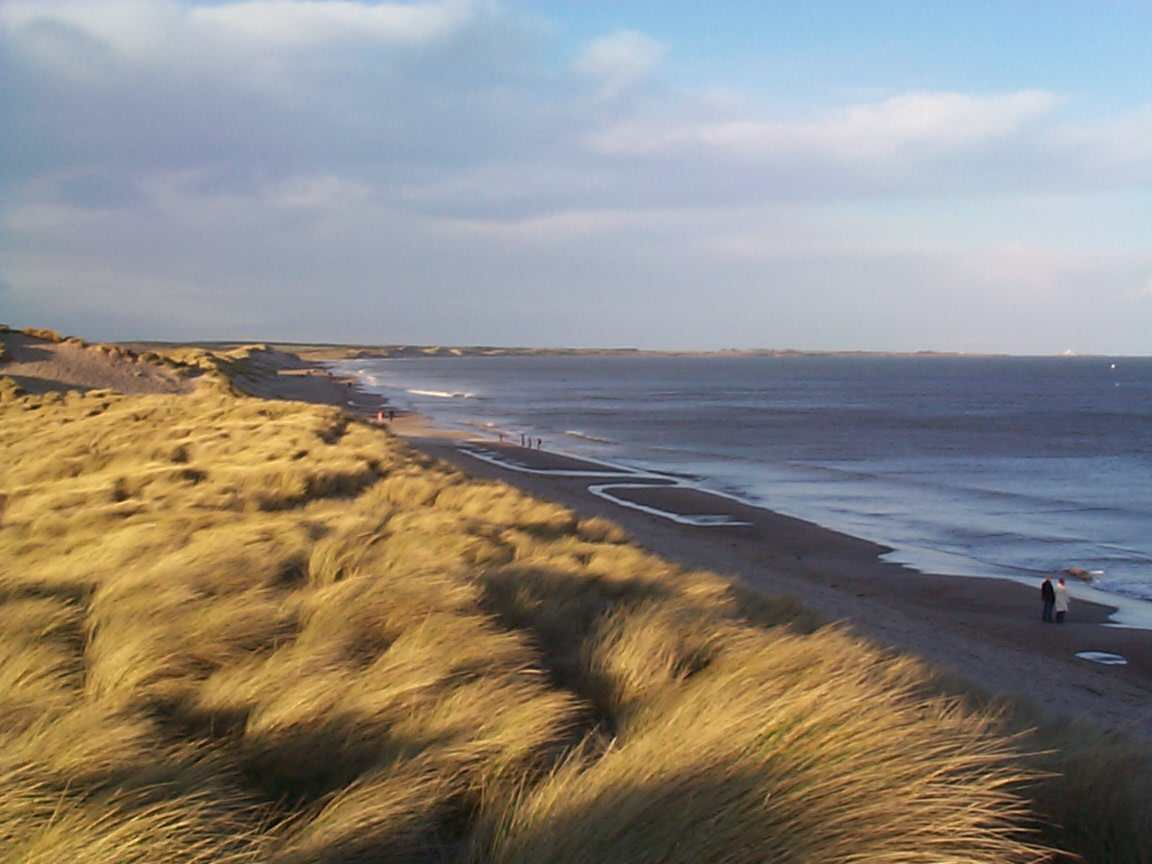
Druridge Bay

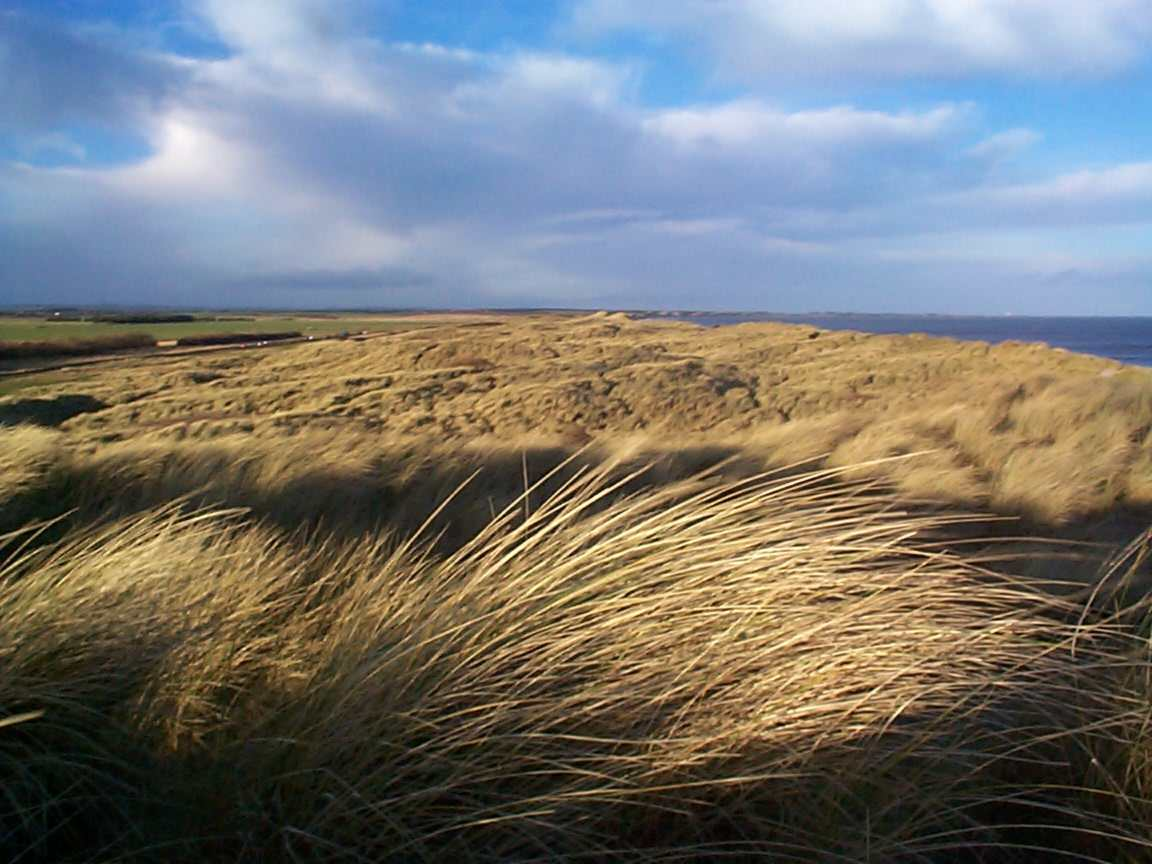
Druridge Bay

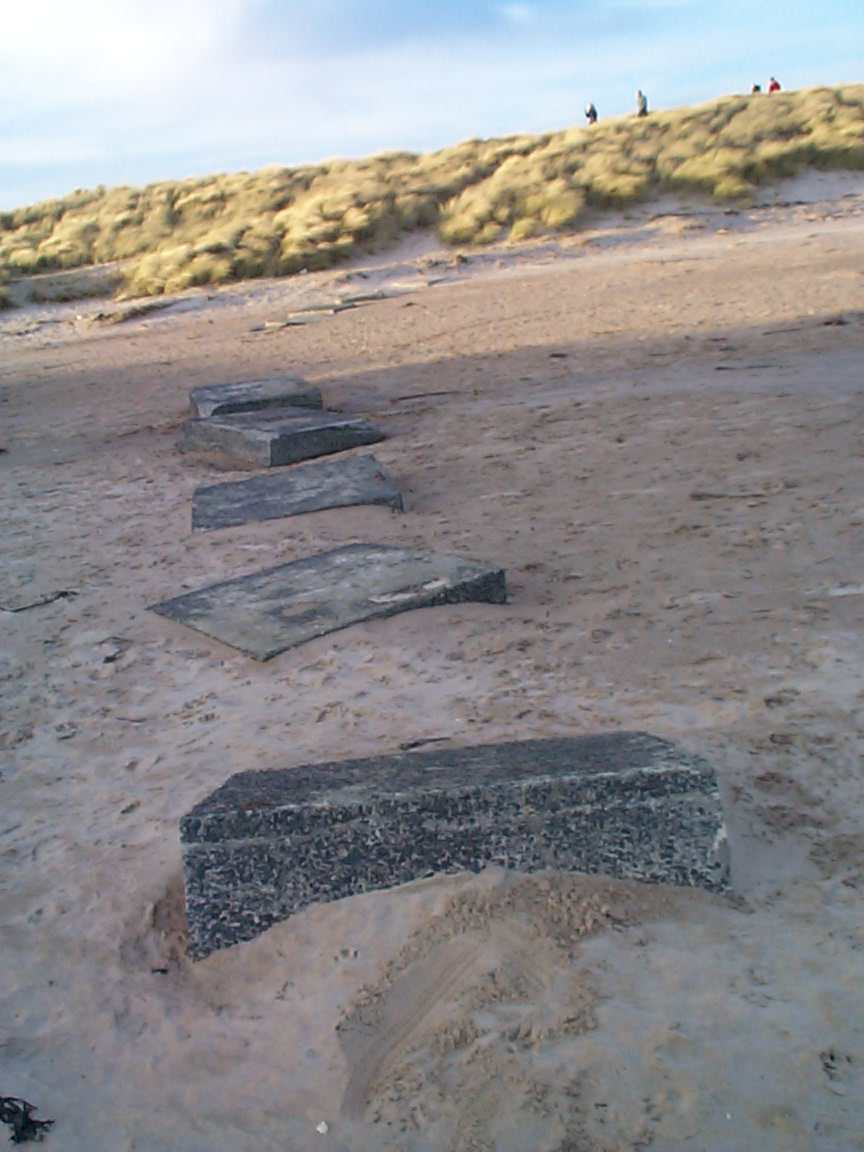
Old World War II anti-tank defences. Now buried by time and sand.
