= Hadston =

Village in Northumberland, England

Coordinates: 55.29423°N 1.60164°W

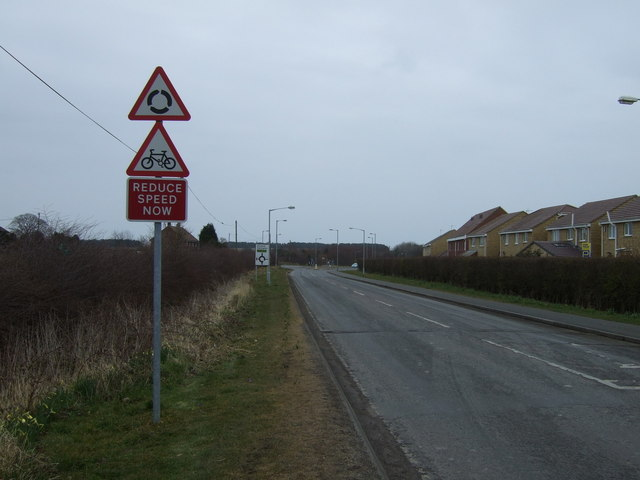
- Hadston Road heading east

- Location within Northumberland
- Population: 2,708 (2011)
- OS grid reference: NZ255995
- Civil parish: East Chevington
- Unitary authority: Northumberland
- Ceremonial county: Northumberland
- Region: North East
- Country: England
- Sovereign state: United Kingdom
- Post town: MORPETH
- Postcode district: NE65
- Police: Northumbria
- Fire: Northumberland
- Ambulance: North East
- UK Parliament: North Northumberland

Hadston is a village in the civil parish of East Chevington, in Northumberland, England, about 2.5 miles (4 km) south of Amble. In 2011 Hadston had a population of 2,708.

== History ==
The name of Hadston is mentioned in historical documents, which date back to the 12th century. In the mid 16th century Hadston township was acquired by Robert Brandling of North Gosforth. It remained in the Brandling family until the mid 17th century when it was sold to Sir William Carnaby of Thernham. On his death Hadston passed to his daughter, Jane Carnaby, who was married to Sir Thomas Haggerston. It remained with the Haggerstons until 1826 when it was sold to Mr Addison Baker Cresswell of Cresswell, Northumberland. The land was considered extremely fertile and was well-cultivated farmland producing excellent crops. Prior to the estate being sold to Mr Baker Cresswell one of the tenants of Hadston Link House, Mr Robert Coward, had developed an improved seed drill to facilitate the cultivation of this fruitful land. In 1867 Mr Baker Cresswell leased the estate to the Broomhill Colliery Company and several drift mines seem to have been worked in conjunction with Broomhill Colliery but it is not clear how much tonnage was raised.

Throughout the 19th century the population of Hadston remained almost static: in 1801 the population was 68 and in 1891 it was 78. It peaked in 1851 when it reached 103. In the 19th century it was divided into four farms: Hadston, Hadston Link House, High Coldrife and Low Coldrife but has now expanded to become a village in its own right. The town now has a small shopping complex known locally as the Precinct, this hosts a post office, Co-Operative supermarket and community centre. The nearest town is Amble which is situated 3 miles to the North.

== Governance ==
Hadston is in the parliamentary constituency of North Northumberland. Hadston was formerly a township in Warkworth parish, from 1866 Hadston was a civil parish in its own right until it was abolished on 1 April 1955 and merged with East Chevington. At the 1951 census (the last before the abolition of the parish), Hadston had a population of 196.

== Landmarks ==
The site of the old opencast mine workings have been reclaimed and landscaped as a country park – Druridge Bay Country Park. In 2018, Hadston unveiled its memorial bench to celebrate 100 years since the signing of Armistice. It was made by local Artist Blacksmith Ashlee Donaldson.

St. John the Divine church stands at the western end of Hadston Road, serving as the parish church for all of East Chevington, built in 1858. Next to the church lies the Chevington and Broomhill War Memorial, commemorating around 100 men lost in the first and second world war. Originally built in 1921, the memorial was then amended after the second world war. On the memorial lies the words from the 19th century poem Recessional,

Lord God of Hosts

Be with us yet

Lest we forget

Lest we forget

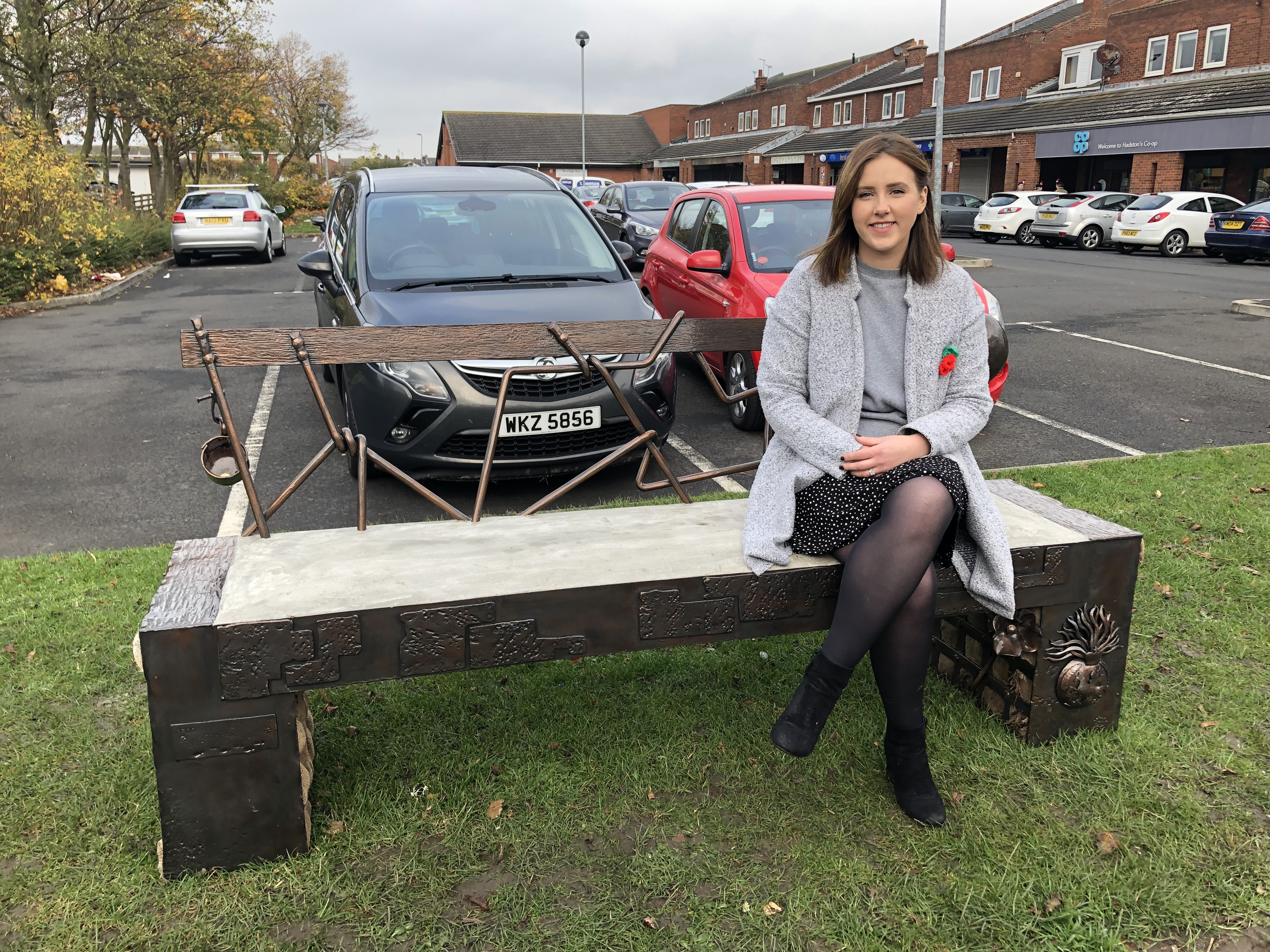
Ashlee Donaldson with her memorial bench located in Hadston, Northumberland

== Notable people ==
Robert Coward, tenant of Hadston Link House, developed an improved seed drill.
