= Druridge Bay Country Park =

Country Park in Northumberland, England

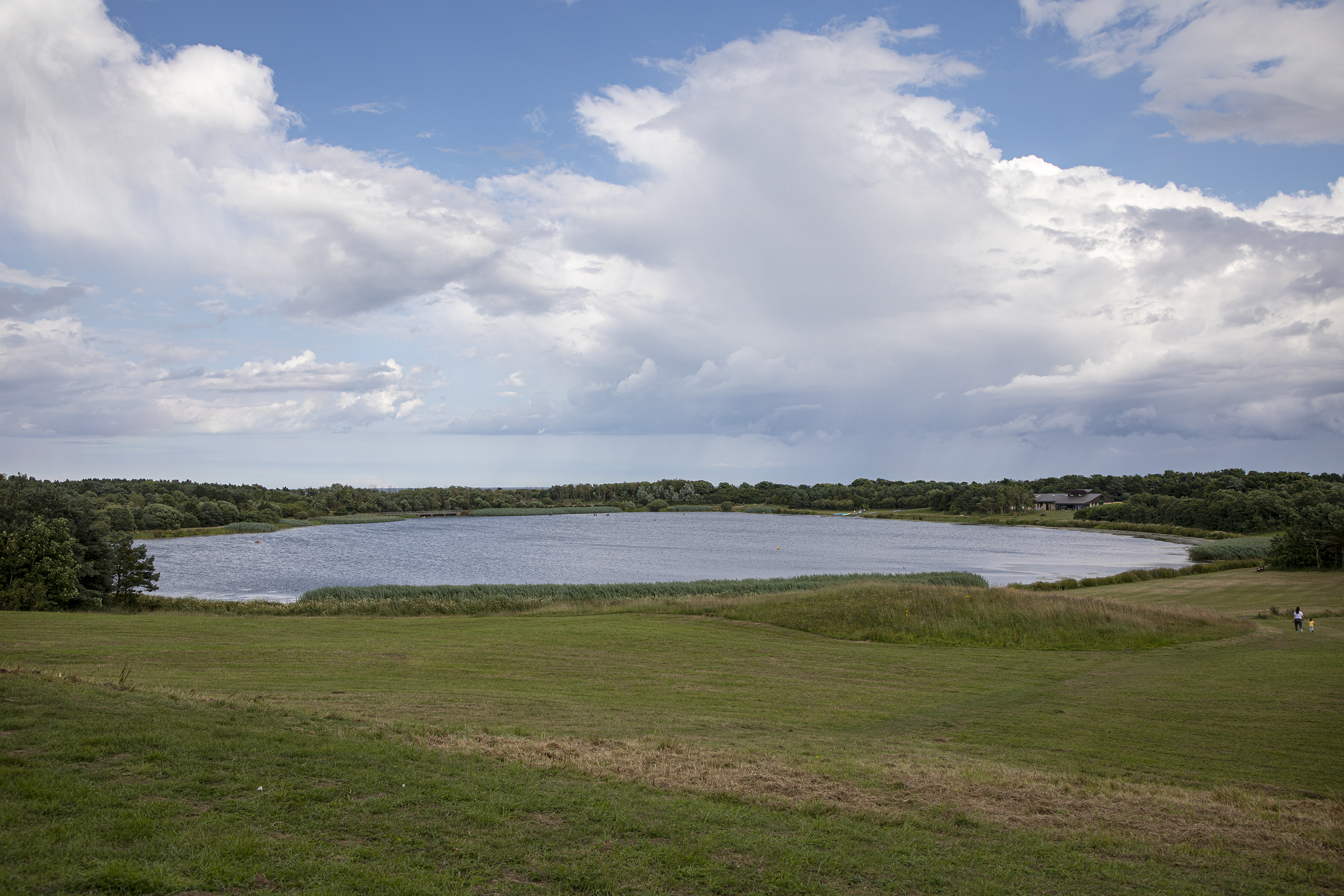
- Ladyburn Lake at Druridge Bay Country Park

- Location within Northumberland
- Type: Country park
- Location: Druridge Bay, Northumberland
- Nearest town: Amble
- OS grid: NU269000
- Coordinates: 55.294°N 1.577°W
- Area: 65.8 acres (26.6 ha)
- Elevation: 21 feet (6.3 m)
- Established: 1970 (open 1989)
- Operator: Northumberland County Council
- Open: All year
- Designation: Northumberland Shore SSSI (partial)
- Parking: Pay and display
- Public transit: Hadston, Red Row; bus service 518
- Website: Official website

Druridge Bay Country Park is adjacent to Druridge Bay between Amble and Cresswell, on the coastline of Northumberland, England. The country park was opened officially in 1989, but works had been ongoing since the 1970s to remediate the site after opencast coaling operations. The park is accessible by vehicle from the A1068 road, and is located on the England Coast Path. Public transport can be taken near to the park's closest village, which involves a 15-minute walk to get to the park.

== History ==
The eastern edge of the park, where it meets the coastline, was used in the Second World War as an aerial gunnery and target practice range. This was administered by the nearby RAF Acklington station. Opencasting and quarrying were the previous industries in the area, and when these ceased, the site was redeveloped into a country park. Coal has been worked in the area progressively since the 1940s, which has left several large ponds and pools as an after effect of the coaling operations. Druridge Country Park is situated mostly on the former Coldrife surface mine, which was granted permission in 1965 and worked progressively over eight years.

The lake is fed by Lady Burn, and was created in the early 1970s, starting to fill with water from 1971. However, the water leaked out through old mine workings and had emptied by 1974. In 1983, clay from nearby coal workings was used to re-line the bottom of the lake and it was allowed to refill.

The park is 12 miles (19 km) south east of Alnwick, 3 miles (4.8 km) south of Amble, and 4 miles (6.4 km) north of Widdrington. It has a junction off the A1068 road, and is also accessible by bus from the nearby villages of Hadston and Red Row (No. 518, which includes a 15-minute walk to the country park).

Whilst access was available for some time before official opening, the park was deemed to have been opened in July 1989 when the visitor centre was unveiled. In 1992, the Northumberland Shore SSSI was established, with the easternmost part of the park falling within the zone of the SSSI. In 2000, the park attracted 100,000 visitors Further investment in 2020 included a refurbishment of the visitor centre and the creation of an area for caravans and campers. Management of the park is undertaken by Northumberland County Council.

== Activities ==
The park covers an area of 65.8 acres (26.6 ha) with the centrepiece being the 25-acre (10-hectare), 16-foot (4.9 m) deep Ladyburn Lake. The lake is used for variety of watersports such as kayaking, sailing, paddleboarding, windsurfing, canoeing, and wild swimming. The park has a visitor centre, cafe, toilets, a play park and is wheelchair accessible. Walking is another popular activity and the eastern edge of the site has the England Coastal Path running through it.

The park was the setting of time trials for the 1995 World Cross Country running championships, and the national triathlon championships in 2009.

== Wildlife ==
Birds are particularly prevalent in the park as it is near the coast and has standing water. Those spotted at the park are bullfinch, crossbill, kingfisher, redpoll, siskin, willow tit, gadwall, red-breasted mergansers, and long-tailed duck. During the winter, the coast and park are host to divers, grebes, geese, whooper and bewick swans.
