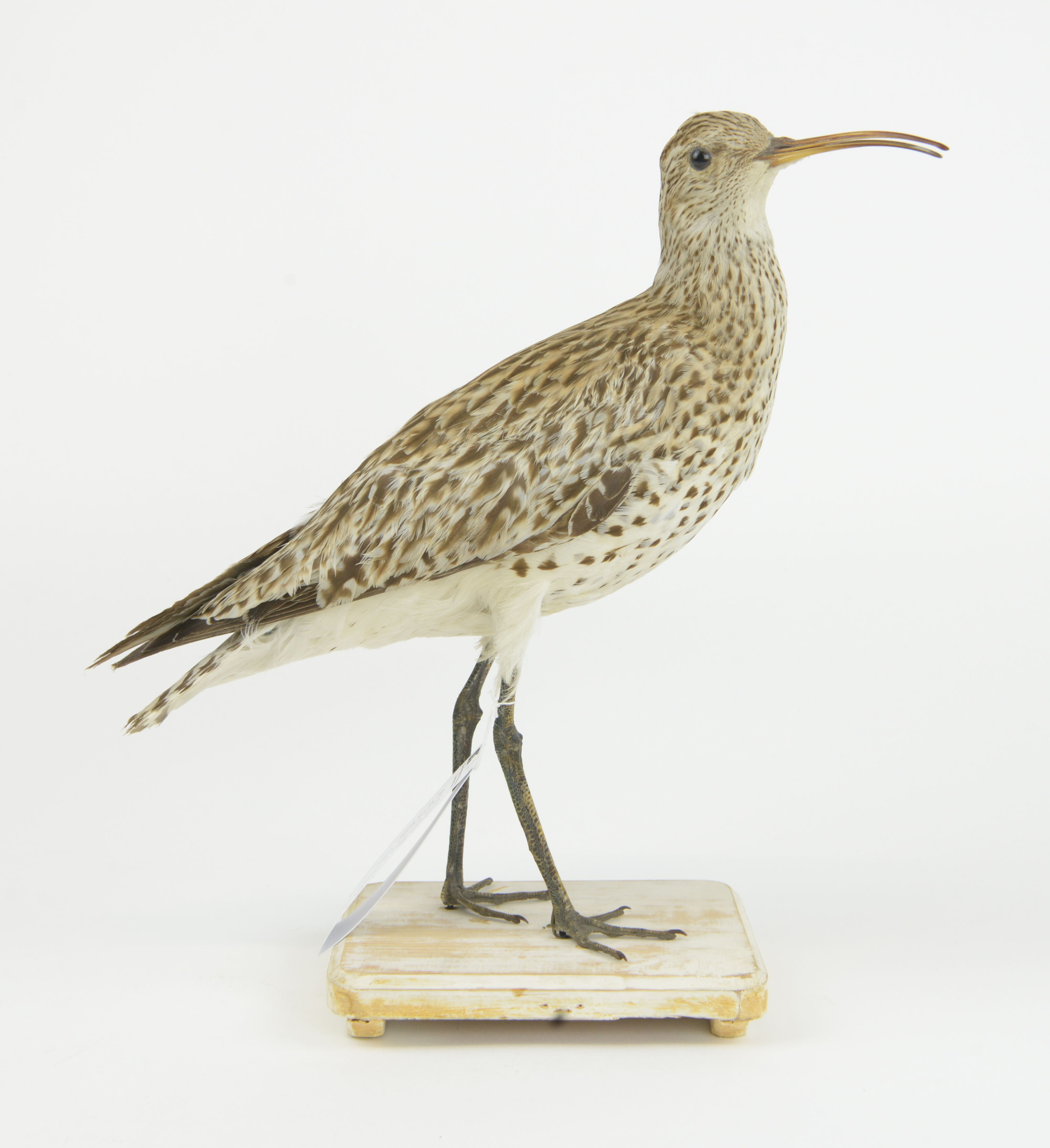
- Taxidermy specimen from the Naturalis Biodiversity Center

Conservation status
- Extinct (2024) (IUCN 3.1)
- CITES Appendix I

Scientific classification
- Kingdom: Animalia
- Phylum: Chordata
- Class: Aves
- Order: Charadriiformes
- Family: Scolopacidae
- Genus: Numenius
- Species: †N. tenuirostris

Binomial name
- †Numenius tenuirostris Vieillot, 1817

= Slender-billed curlew =

Extinct species of bird that migrated to Northern Africa, Asia and Europe

The slender-billed curlew (Numenius tenuirostris) is an extinct species of curlew formerly native to Eurasia and North Africa. Isotope analysis suggests the majority of the former population bred in the Kazakh Steppe despite a record from the Siberian swamps, and was migratory, wintering in shallow freshwater habitats around the Mediterranean. This species has occurred as a vagrant in western Europe, the Canary Islands, the Azores, Oman, Canada, and Japan.

In November 2024, the species was declared globally extinct, with the last irrefutable sighting of the slender-billed curlew identified from Morocco in February 1995.

== Description ==
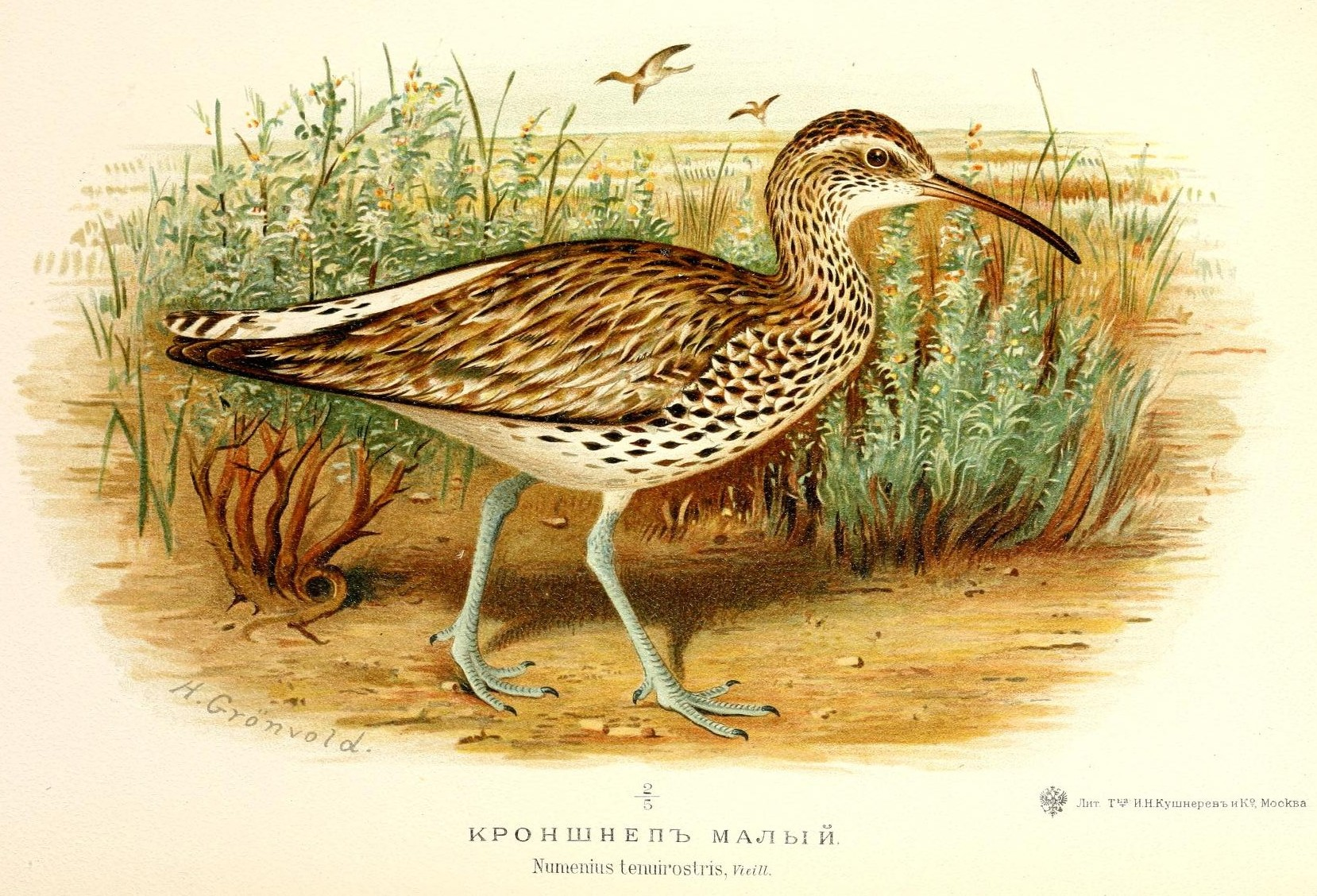
Illustration by Henrik Grönvold

The slender-billed curlew was a small curlew, 36–41 cm (14–16 in) in length with a 77–88 cm (30–35 in) wingspan. It was therefore about the same size as a Eurasian whimbrel, but was more like the Eurasian curlew in plumage. The breeding adult was mainly greyish brown above, with a whitish rump and lower back. The underparts were whitish, heavily streaked with dark brown. The flanks had round or heart-shaped spots. The non-breeding plumage was similar, but with fewer flank spots. Male and females were alike in plumage, but females were longer-billed than males, an adaptation in curlew species that eliminates direct competition for food between the sexes. The juvenile plumage was very similar to the adult, but the flank were marked with brown streaking, the heart-shaped spots only appearing toward the end of the first winter.

Compared to the Eurasian curlew, the slender-billed curlew was whiter on the breast, tail, and underwing, and the bill is shorter, more slender, and slightly straighter at the base. The arrowhead-shaped flank spots of the Eurasian curlew also are different from the round or heart-shaped spots of the adults slender-billed. The head pattern, with a dark cap and whitish supercilium, recalls that of the Eurasian whimbrel, but that species also has a central crown stripe and a more clearly marked pattern overall; the pattern of the slender-billed curlew would be hard to make out in the field.

This species shows more white than other curlews; however, the white underwing has been stressed too much as a relevant identification criteria along with the distinctive flank markings of adults (not helpful in juvenile and 1st year bird before post-juvenile moult). The most recent and most updated identification's paper, reports as clinching characters the uniformly dark underside of 4 to 6 outer primaries (the wing-tip or "hand"), the black (adults) or at least darker grey (juvenile and 1st year birds) legs, and the white tail with fewer dark bars.

=== Vocalisations ===
The call was a cour-lee, similar to that of the Eurasian curlew, but higher-pitched, more melodic, and shorter. The alarm call is a fast cu-ee. The only recording of the slender-billed curlew known to date was made by the French ornithologist Claude Chappuis. After his death in 2021, his collection, including the slender-billed curlew, was donated to the Macaulay Library at Cornell University in Ithaca (New York).

== Distribution ==
The only confirmed breeding records of the slender-billed curlew were a small region of raised bogs north of Omsk, Russia in a period between 1909 and 1925. Isotopic analysis suggests that main breeding range of the species was in a narrow belt in Kazakhstan centered around the 50th parallel north. This area is predominantly steppe, with some areas of forest steppe.

In recent history, it mostly migrated to the Mediterranean as well as southern Arabia, with claims in the northern reaches of the Persian gulf, in Kuwait and Iraq. There have been historical records of the bird elsewhere, as in an ornithological dictionary of Gibraltar, written in 1895, it indirectly states that the slender-billed curlew was recorded as a passage migrant in Málaga, Spain.

== Behaviour ==
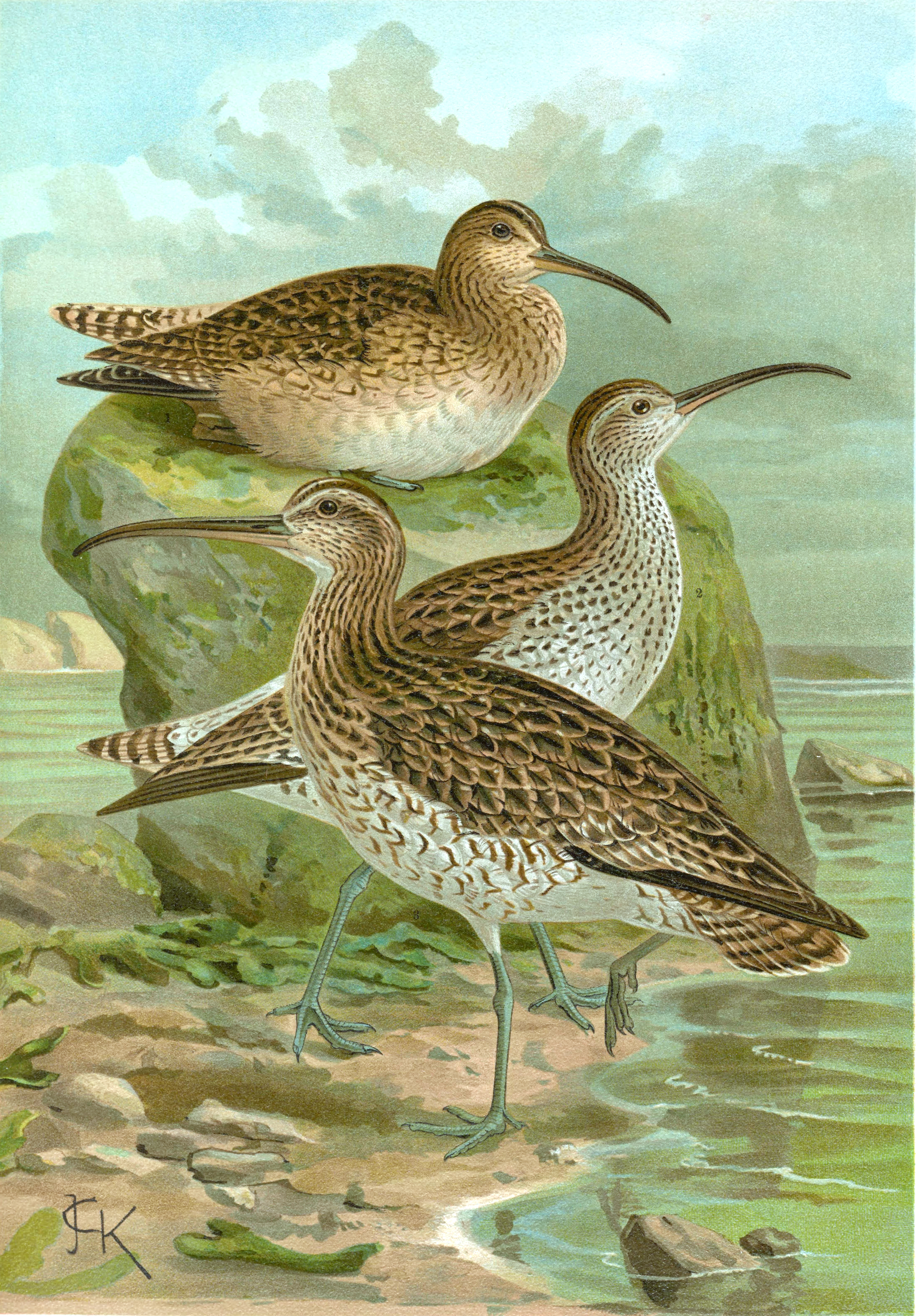
Slender-billed curlew (centre) between two Eurasian whimbrels

Little is known about the breeding biology of the slender-billed curlew; however, the few nests that have been observed each contained four eggs.

The species fed primarily by probing soft mud with its bill for small invertebrates, but it also picked small prey items from the surface when available. Outside the breeding season, the slender-billed curlew was highly gregarious and often associated with related species, particularly the Eurasian curlew.

== Decline and extinction ==
After a long period of steady decline, the slender-billed curlew became extremely rare by the late 20th century, then thought to be fewer than 50 adult birds, with the last verified sighting from Morocco in 1995.

The last well-documented nest was found in 1924, near Tara in Omsk Oblast, Siberia (57°N 74°E). Its nesting grounds since then remain unknown, despite several intensive searches (not surprising, with more than 100,000 square kilometres to search). The extent of its decline also is reflected in the absence of wintering birds at previously regular Moroccan sites.

The causes of the decline of the species are uncertain, both hunting and habitat loss have been proposed as causes. There are records of hunting of the bird as late as the 1980s in the Merja Zerga wetlands in Morocco, one of the last wintering grounds of the species. As the bird became rarer, this may have exacerbated pressure on hunting of the bird to obtain skins. Specimens were reportedly common in markets in Italy and other areas of Southern Europe, having been shot during their migration. The predicted breeding habitat of the bird in the Kazakh steppes was extensively transformed into wheat-growing farmland as part of the Soviet Virgin Lands campaign during the 1950s, which resulted in the decline of many bird species native to the area, and probably also affected the slender-billed curlew, though the population decline for the species appears to have begun decades before the farming campaign. Habitat conversion into farmland in the broader region had been ongoing since the 19th century. Wetland habitat in the wintering areas like Morocco and Hungary had also been altered into farmlands since the 19th century, probably also contributing to the decline.

More recently, 20 birds were reported in Italy in 1995, but this most unbelievable record is now confirmed to be referred to Numenius arquata orientalis as both photographs and sound recordings have shown (Kirwan et al., 2015). There was a potential record of an immature (one year old) at Druridge Pools in Northumberland, England, on 4–7 May 1998, for details of which see the Druridge Bay curlew. The bird was initially accepted onto the British List but was removed in 2013 following a review of the identification.

Slender-billed curlews have been reported in various Western Palearctic locations on a number of occasions since the Druridge bird, including claimed, but unverified, sightings of single birds from Italy and Greece; none have been documented with conclusive photographs and at least one claimed bird, at RSPB Minsmere, Suffolk, England, in 2004, is now widely believed to have been a Eurasian curlew.

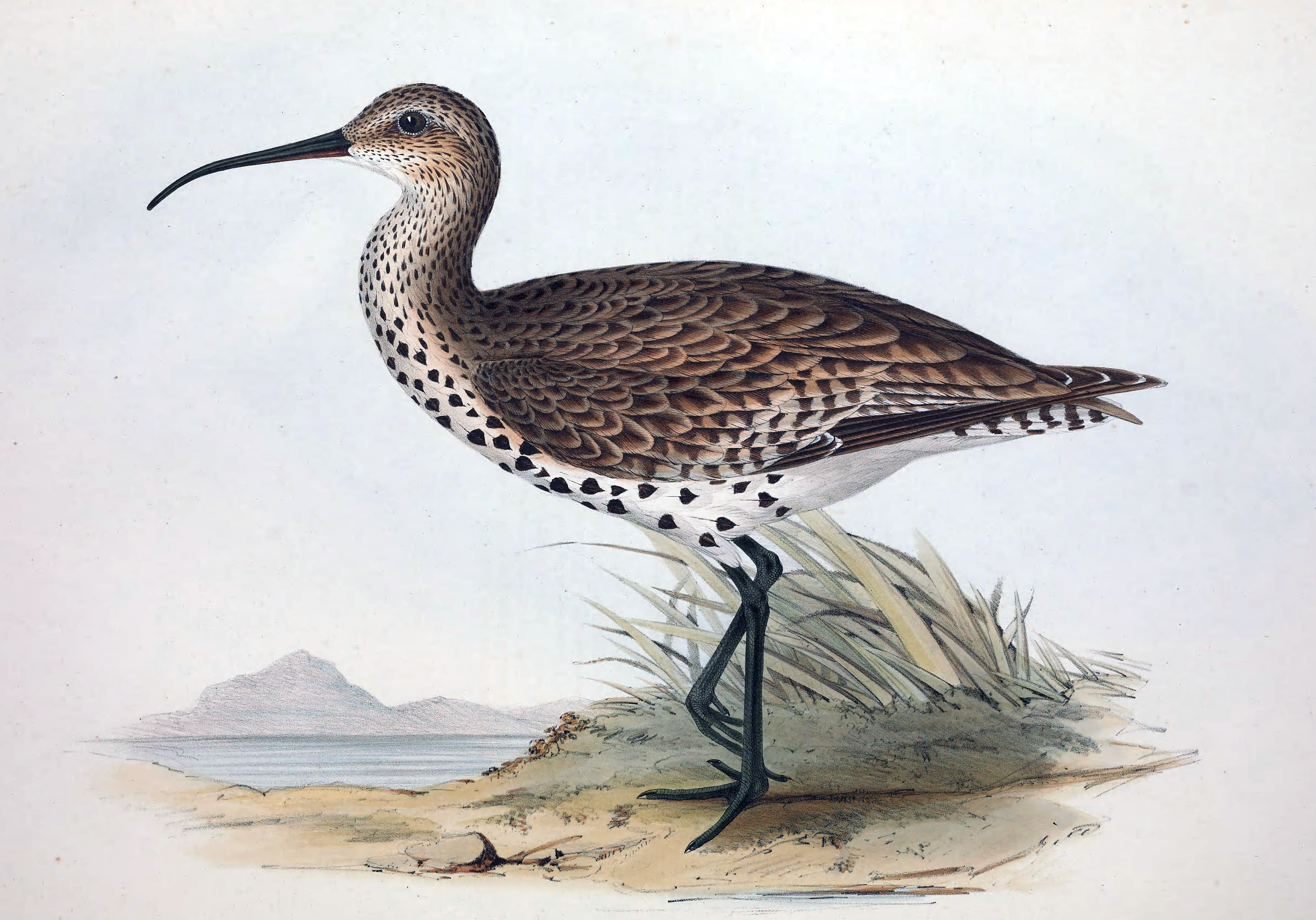
Illustration from c. 1830

Further sourced reports of the species were published in 2007, in British Birds magazine; the article stated, quoting from Zhmud:

During the last few years, small groups of birds have been found in the northern coastal areas [of the Danube Delta], frequenting low-lying islands, bays, and sand-spits covered with Common Glasswort Salicornia europaea [...] Four birds were present from 25 July to 21 August 2003, six were seen on 11 August 2004, and another on 12 August 2004.

A sighting of a single bird was reported from Albania in 2006 by a team including ornithologists from the environmental organization EuroNatur.

The species was officially declared extinct in 2024, with the IUCN listing updated on 10 October 2025. This study did not consider any later sightings after the last confirmed sighting in 1995 in Morocco to be credible.
