= Stell =

Stell is a name for a deep pool in a river where salmon rest and are fished, such as that found at Amble in Northumberland, England.

Fishing using stell nets was made illegal by the Tweed Act in Britain in 1857.
