= William Rochester Pape =

English gunsmith (1831–1923)

- Born: 1831; Amble, Northumberland, England
- Died: 1923 (aged 91–92)
- Resting place: St John's Cemetery, Elswick, Tyne and Wear
- Occupation: Gunsmith
- Awards: London Field Trials (1858, 1859 and 1866)

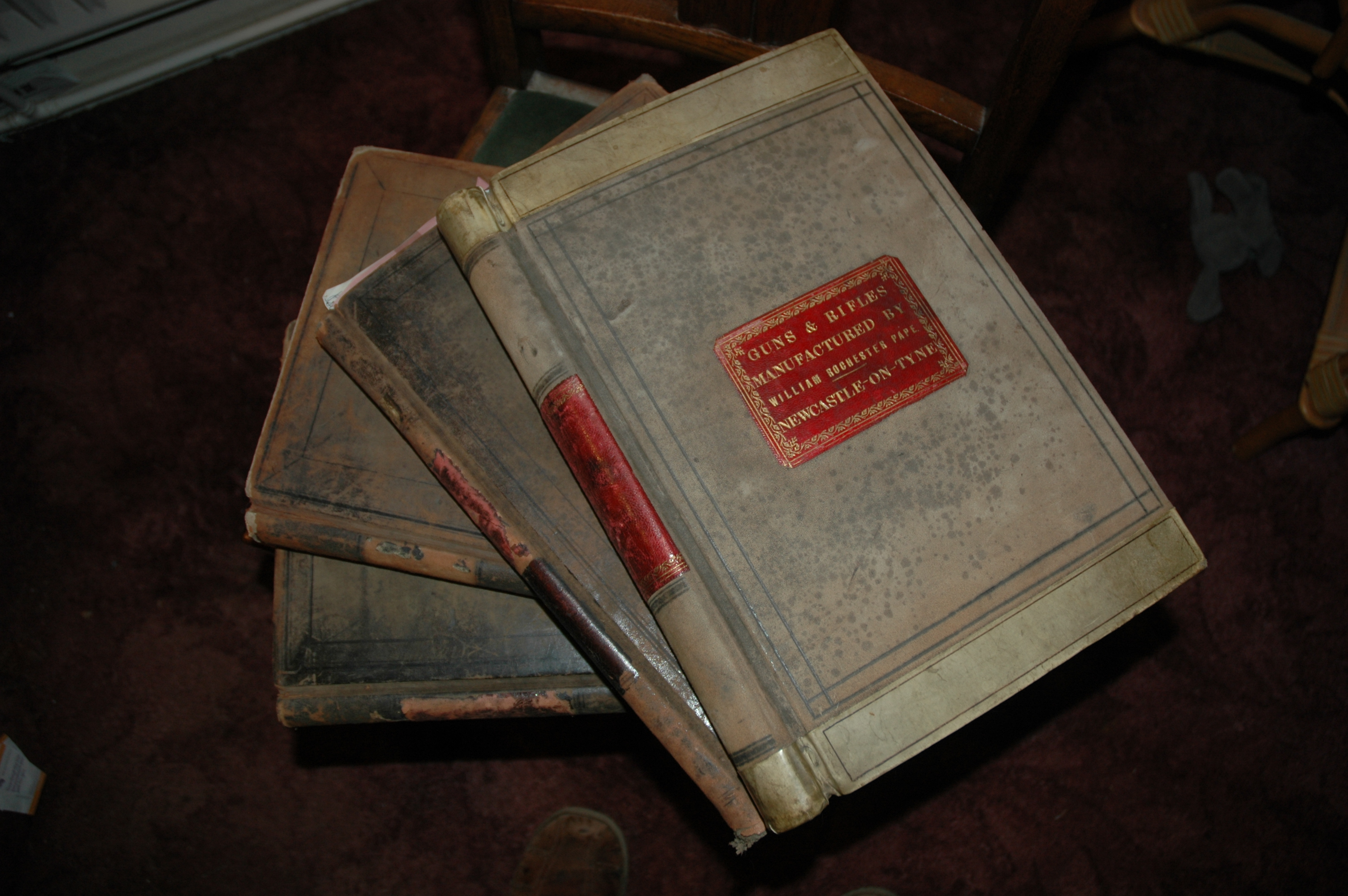

William Rochester Pape (1831–1923) was an English gunsmith who is often credited with inventing and patenting the choke boring system for shotguns, which W. W. Greener went on to develop. He also patented several extractors, and invented draught excluders for railway carriage doors and windows.

== History ==
Pape was born in Amble, Northumberland, England in 1831, the son of James and Dorothy Pape. He opened in first shop in Newcastle-upon-Tyne in 1858, expanding his family's game dealership, and produced his first shotgun in 1857. In the 1860s, he expanded his business, buying another premises at 29 Collingwood Street, Newcastle. In 1866, he invented the choke boring system for shotguns (British Patent No. 1501), and went on to patent a system of mechanically retracting firing pins, improving on this system later that year, and again in 1870.

In 1875, he won a prize of ten guineas as 'the original inventor' of choke boring, a prize intended to settle disputes over the origins of choke boring. Other people who have been credited with the invention of choke boring include Jeremiah Smith of Southfield, Rhode Island in 1827, Fred Kimble, who used choke boring to win the Illinois State Championship in 1868, and Sylvester H. Roper who applied for a patent in 1866, six months before Pape. His company supplied guns to the Japanese during the First Sino-Japanese War.

Pape won the London Field Trials in 1858, 1859 and 1866, and came second and third in class 1 for choke border guns and first in class 2 for cylinders in 1875. He won a prize medal at the Royal Mining Engineering Jubilee Exhibition in 1887, and received a diploma of merit at the Glasgow exhibition in 1889.

On 28/29 June 1859, Pape, along with Messrs John Shorthose, a brewer's agent, organised the first dog show in Great Britain, held at the Newcastle-upon-Tyne Corn Exchange, offering Pape shotguns as prizes, however only one shotgun is referred to in the Pape Ledgers.

Pape retired in 1889, leaving his business to his son, Victor Pape, and died in 1923 after a road traffic accident. He is buried in St John’s Cemetery in Elswick in Newcastle’s West End.
