= Merja Zerga =

Tidal lagoon in Morocco

Coordinates: 34°50′N 6°15′W

Designations

Ramsar Wetland
- Designated: 20 June 1980
- Reference no.: 206

Merja Zerga or Lagune de Moulay Bou Selham is a tidal lagoon on the Atlantic coast of Morocco, 70 km north of the city of Kenitra. Classified as a Permanent Biological Reserve in 1978, it is managed by several government agencies.

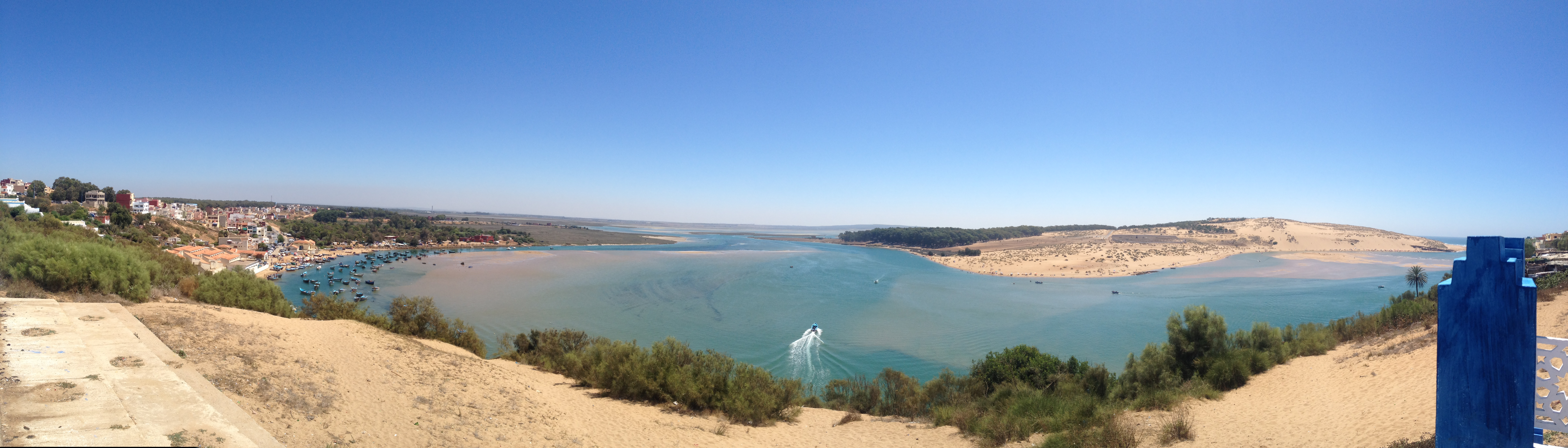
Panoramic view of the Merja Zerga, taken from the city of Moulay Bousselham

== Environment ==
The lagoon, which covers 4,500 hectares, receives water from the Oued Drader and from the local water table. Its average depth is 1.5 metres. The area's annual rainfall (600–700 mm) results in winter floods that inundate the surrounding areas.

A Ramsar Convention site, the lagoon hosts 100 bird species and has been identified as a key site on the East Atlantic Flyway. It has also been designated an Important Bird Area (IBA) by BirdLife International, because it supports significant populations of wintering waterbirds. Between 15,000 and 30,000 ducks overwinter at the lagoon, and it regularly holds 50,000 to 100,000 waders. Its permanent inhabitants include marsh owls. Winter visitors include ruddy shelduck, common shelduck, gadwall, Eurasian wigeon, northern shoveler, marbled teal, greater flamingo, common coot, pied avocet, grey plover, and the extinct slender-billed curlew.
