= Amble =

Town and civil parish in Northumberland, England

Coordinates: 55.3306°N 1.5783°W

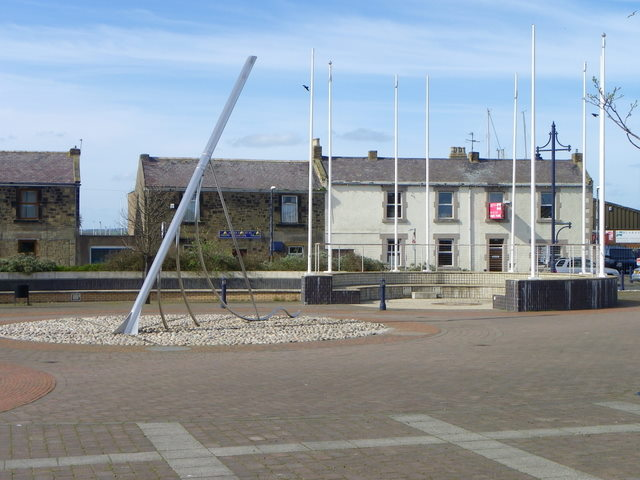
- The sundial in the town square

- Location within Northumberland
- Population: 5,860. (2021)
- OS grid reference: NU267041
- Civil parish: Amble by the Sea
- Unitary authority: Northumberland
- Ceremonial county: Northumberland
- Region: North East
- Country: England
- Sovereign state: United Kingdom
- Post town: MORPETH
- Postcode district: NE65
- Dialling code: 01665
- Police: Northumbria
- Fire: Northumberland
- Ambulance: North East
- UK Parliament: North Northumberland

Amble is a town on the North Sea coast of Northumberland, England, at the mouth of the River Coquet; Coquet Island is visible from its beaches and harbour. In 2021, the parish of Amble by the Sea had a population of 5,860.

== Toponymy ==
There are two suggested origins of the place-name Amble. One theory suggests a Goidelic origin from Am Béal, meaning "tidal inlet", and is attributed to the historical presence of Irish missionaries in the area who spoke that language despite most of the local population not doing so. An earlier theory, originating with Eilert Ekwall, is an Old English origin of Amma/Anna bile, meaning "Amma's/Anna's headland".

There are sources indicating that the name and variants thereof – such as Ambell and Ambhill – may have been in use as long ago as 1203 AD. Northumberland was not recorded in the Domesday Book.

== History ==
Various urns, cists, flint spearheads and other evidence of ancient burials were found near to Amble in the 1880s and 1890s. Some of those remains showed signs of cremation.

Outcrops of coal had been found along the coastline between the River Coquet and the River Tyne at least as long ago as the reign of Elizabeth I, when unsuccessful attempts had been made to extract and transport it in an economic manner. A failed proposal to use Amble as a port for the shipment of locally sourced coal and salt is recorded in 1618, although this failure did not discourage William Hewitt (Note: Sir William Hewitt's name in relation to this land transfer is also recorded as Hewytt.) from making the then rare decision to reserve for himself the rights to the coal when he sold the townships of Amble and Hauxley in 1630. A significant factor in the failure of all the early attempts, when compared to the success of ventures in the valleys of the Tyne and the Wear, was that of economies of scale. Those more successful areas at that time had plentiful easily accessed reserves which encouraged investment and the sharing of fixed costs such as harbour facilities, buildings and machinery among a large number of enterprises.

The early situation changed as the operators in the valleys exhausted the cheaply extracted ores and found themselves having to mine deeper and also further away from the rivers that were used for transport, thus increasing their costs per unit of coal mined. Some coal was probably being shipped from previously uneconomic places such as Amble and Blyth by the end of the seventeenth century, and it was certainly being extracted at Amble by that time.

Amble grew in the nineteenth century as collieries were opened; and the newly built railway links to the Northumberland coalfields made the town a centre for the sea transport and export of coal. Prior to the development of the harbour, the town was "little more than a hamlet", according to the architectural guides originally compiled by Nikolaus Pevsner. The principal local mineworkings were those at Broomhill and at Radcliffe.

The harbour at Amble was the smallest of those that served the coalfields of Northumberland and Durham. It was originally under the control of the Dukes of Northumberland until, in 1837, a port authority – the Warkworth Harbour Commission – was created to supervise improvements. Following consultations with various engineers, the proposals submitted by John Rennie in 1838 were accepted. These included the construction of breakwaters to the north and the south, which were eventually completed in 1849 at a total cost of £116,000. The larger northern breakwater, which was originally 2,300 feet (700 m) in length, was extended in the early part of the 20th century but suffered from the undermining effects of the tide and required shoring with slag brought in from the ironworks of Hartlepool and Middlesbrough. (Note: The idea of developing a harbour had been proposed earlier. Hamilton Fulton, who had worked with both John Rennie the Elder and John Rennie the Younger, had made proposals in 1832 at the request of the owner of the nearby Togston Colliery.)

The construction of docks had also been mooted in 1844 and 1850 but the arrival of the railway led instead to the construction of coal staithes. A change in consulting engineer in 1869 resulted in extensive dredging of the harbour but did not greatly improve the prospects of the port. (Note: It was noted in 1860 that the harbour developments had been detrimental to the salmon fisheries on the River Coquet, known as the Amble Stell. This situation had allegedly existed from the outset and the solicitor to the Duke of Northumberland saw no end to the continued work.) Shipments of coal amounted to over 500,000 tons by 1914, but this was a modest volume when compared to the other regional ports. Robert Rennison notes with regard to the relative lack of prosperity that the port served a "small and discrete coalfield".

The 5.75-mile (9.25 km) railway branched on a single track to Amble at a point near to Chevington and was opened in September 1849 by the York, Newcastle and Berwick Railway, initially as a freight-only line. Passenger services between Amble and Chevington began in 1879, following the construction of a station at Broomhill in 1878 and facilities at Amble itself. The line between Amble and Broomhill was double-track. The passenger service ended in July 1930 and the general freight service was withdrawn in 1964. Coal traffic, which had amounted to around 750,000 tons annually in the 1920s, came to an end in 1969 when the line was closed completely.

Other industries, such as sea fishing and both ship building and repair in an area known as the Braid had expanded with the growth of the town. Traditional Northumbrian fishing vessels such as cobles had previously sheltered in the natural harbour for centuries. One local coble manufacturing business, J. & J. Harrison, founded in 1870, had been the first to introduce engines to the form and was still producing it in 1973, along with more generally utilised craft.

Amble Golf Club was founded in 1910 but disappeared in the late 1950s.

On 1 December 1943, a Royal Air Force Short Stirling Mk III (EH880) which departed RAF Mepal, Cambridgeshire, had completed its mission of dropping sea mines off the coast of Denmark. The aircraft was due to land at RAF Acklington. The pilots attempted a second approach to Acklington in bad weather; the aircraft crashed into Cliff House Farm, Togston. Six of the seven crew died along with five children on the ground: a 1997 housing development in the western edge of the town has streets named after the children who perished.

== Present day ==
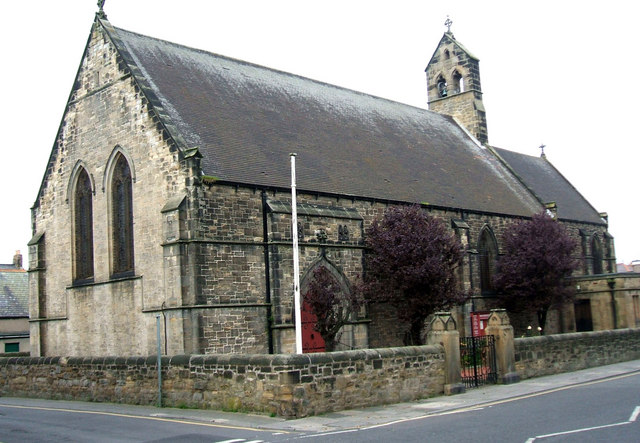
St Cuthbert's Church

Sir Nikolaus Pevsner's guide of 1992 says that "Today Amble is a not unpleasant small town but has few buildings of distinction." Of those, he records the church of St Cuthbert, which was originally constructed in 1870 and expanded in 1929, and its associated 1876-built vicarage. In addition, he notes some early Victorian terraces on Queen Street and North Street, as well as "a fragment of wall with a C 15 window, square-headed and of two trefoiled lights with uncusped sunk panels above. Though it may seem unlikely, this is an in situ fragment of the medieval manor house. It belonged to Tynemouth Priory and may have served as a monastic cell." This latter is found on High Street.

The fishing industry continues in Amble today, albeit with a reduced number of vessels, as does a small marine industry which is mainly concentrated around the construction and repair of yachts and other pleasure craft. A small industrial estate is located to the southwest of the town, whose clients include vehicle repairs and telecommunications companies. However, as of 2012, most of the units on the estate are unoccupied and the town has been affected by the closure of nearby businesses, such as a site operated by Alcan, as well as two food processing businesses in the town that employed nearly 300 people. A proposed retail development by Tesco had also been postponed due to poor trading conditions. The town's mayor announced that "the prospects for jobs are very bleak indeed."

The Royal National Lifeboat Institution maintains a station at Amble. Amble RNLI station has two lifeboats – the Shannon Class 'Shannon Elizabeth and Leonard', which replaced the Mersey Class lifeboat 'The Four Boys' in November 2016 after the station raised £200,000 towards the new vessel's £2,000,000 cost. Amble's second lifeboat is the 'D Class' Inshore Lifeboat (or ILB), the 'Mildred Holcroft'. There have been lifeboats operating from the town since 1842 and, for example, between 30 and 40 people perished in various wrecks near to Amble on 17–18 December 1872.

=== Regeneration and community development ===
Amble had been a recipient of regional development assistance from 1965, when the restructuring of coal-mining operations, led by Alfred Robens of the National Coal Board, had a substantial detrimental effect on the local economy. Unemployment in the town was then 6.5 per cent, compared to a national average of 1.5 per cent. By 1969, the Northern Economic Planning Council was proposing the closure of the port, which no longer had any coal traffic, in favour of redevelopment for leisure purposes. The same year saw the closure of the nearby airbase of RAF Acklington, where some of the population worked, and local unemployment exceeded 13 per cent as proposals for a substantial mushroom farming operation that would alleviate the problems were made. The farming operation failed to materialise due to lack of financial support from the government.

The development assistance was withdrawn in 1984, at which time a newspaper report noted that over 30 per cent of the 6,000 population were unemployed, with 80 per cent of council house tenants and 45 per cent of home owners receiving benefits or rebates for their housing costs and over 25 per cent of children claiming free school meals. The change in official status was one of the "glaring anomalies" of a government review, resulting from the town being reclassified as part of the "travel to work area" for Alnwick rather than a part of the industrialised regions to the south. Four businesses had been encouraged by the assistance to locate in the town during the preceding decade, creating around 400 jobs.

Amble Development Trust is a company operating as a charity with the purpose of working with other bodies to regenerate the town. It was established in 1994. The Trust has been involved in numerous local projects to develop Amble both physically and socially, including having input on improvements to Queen Street, which is the main shopping thoroughfare. The work of the Trust and its associated body, the Amble Strategic Partnership, was recognised by the Royal Town Planning Institute in 2003 when they were given the institute's Planning for Town Regeneration award. This came soon after the same organisation had awarded them their Regional Award for Planning Achievement. Recently new housing has been built, adding an extra 900 homes, and a new hotel called the Amble Inn opened in 2019 bringing much-needed employment to the town. Another project of the Trust is The Ambler, a bi-monthly community newspaper and website, established in 2000 and operated mainly by volunteers. The free bi-monthly newspaper is delivered to every house and business in the town.

== Demography ==
Samuel Lewis reported a township population of 247 in 1831. By the seventh edition of his Topographical Dictionary of England, which was published in 1848, this figure had risen to 724. The population was reported as being 1,040 in 1851. The 1871 census recorded a population of 1,233, spread among 233 houses.

Population of Amble Urban District, 1901 – 1961 (Note: Amble Urban District comprised 1,258 acres (509 ha) during the period 1911–1951, and was 1 acre (0.40 ha) less in 1961.)
	1901	1911	1921	1931	1939	1951	1961
Male		2,475	2,427	2,006	2,197	2,292	2,427
Female		2,406	2,424	2,199	2,483	2,390	2,473
Total	4,428	4,881	4,851	4,205	4,680	4,682	4,900

D. J. Rowe notes that, in common with many Northumbrian towns, historically there was "endemic" overcrowding of the population in Amble. The number of houses that averaged over two people per room was 32.6 per cent in 1911. This figure, while not atypical for the region, was above average for the county and well above that for other regions of the country, such as London.

Housing in Amble Urban District, 1911 – 1961
	1911	1921	1931	1951	1961
Households	1,084	1,098	1,123	1,420	1,601
Houses		1,054	1,051	1,412	1,600
Rooms		3,558	3,758	5,170	6,485

== Governance ==
During the medieval period, Amble was a part of the liberty held by successive priors of Tynemouth, most of whom faced challenges to their authority from both the Crown and their major tenants. The town was ceded to the Crown in 1539, at the time of the Dissolution of the Monasteries.

Until measures such as the Reform Acts of 1832 and 1867, the electoral franchise was very restricted. In the 1826 General Election, there were nine people eligible to vote due to their freehold interests in Amble, of which six actually lived there; another voter lived in Amble but was enfranchised due to freehold interests held elsewhere. Twelve voters living in Amble qualified as freeholders or through land occupancy in the 1841 election, whilst another lived there but qualified due to property held elsewhere, and one lived elsewhere but held qualifying property in the township.

The Amble Local Government District, given the job of looking after the town, was set up around September 1878, the ecclesiastical parish comprising Amble, Hauxley, Gloster Hill and Togston having been formed by splitting from that of Warkworth in 1869 just before completion of the church construction. Elections to the nine-member committee followed and it first met on 25 November 1878. George W. Beattie was appointed Surveyor and Inspector of Nuisances to the Amble Local Board and Urban Sanitary Authority in January 1879. The administration was replaced by Amble Urban District Council which first met on 3 January 1895. Amble Urban District Council had nine elected Councillors. On 1 April 1974 the urban district was abolished and Amble became part of Alnwick district.

On 29 November 1976 the civil parish was renamed from "Amble" to "Amble by the Sea".

On 1 April 2009, the local government structure of Northumberland was reorganised. The six former districts were combined with the county to form the unitary authority of Northumberland, based in Morpeth. Amble was in the former Alnwick District based in the town of Alnwick.

An electoral ward of the same name now exists. This ward includes Hauxley with a total population at the 2011 Census of 4,565. However, some outlying parts of the town are excluded from this Amble ward and are instead combined with Warkworth in a ward named Amble West with Warkworth.

== Climate ==
Being in the British Isles, Amble experiences a maritime climate with cool summers and mild winters. The nearest Met Office weather station for which data are available is at Boulmer, about nine miles to the north.

Climate data for Boulmer 23m asl, 1971–2000
Month	Jan	Feb	Mar	Apr	May	Jun	Jul	Aug	Sep	Oct	Nov	Dec	Year
Record high °C (°F)	15.0 (59.0)	16.1 (61.0)	19.4 (66.9)	23.5 (74.3)	24.5 (76.1)	28.5 (83.3)	28.2 (82.8)	31.0 (87.8)	26.7 (80.1)	21.4 (70.5)	18.0 (64.4)	15.2 (59.4)	31.0 (87.8)
Mean daily maximum °C (°F)	6.7 (44.1)	6.9 (44.4)	8.8 (47.8)	10.1 (50.2)	12.5 (54.5)	15.6 (60.1)	17.9 (64.2)	18.1 (64.6)	15.9 (60.6)	12.8 (55.0)	9.3 (48.7)	7.4 (45.3)	11.9 (53.4)
Mean daily minimum °C (°F)	1.3 (34.3)	1.5 (34.7)	2.5 (36.5)	3.7 (38.7)	5.9 (42.6)	8.6 (47.5)	10.8 (51.4)	10.8 (51.4)	9.1 (48.4)	6.7 (44.1)	3.7 (38.7)	2.2 (36.0)	5.6 (42.1)
Record low °C (°F)	−12.0 (10.4)	−8.9 (16.0)	−10 (14)	−3.9 (25.0)	−1.5 (29.3)	0.9 (33.6)	3.9 (39.0)	4.5 (40.1)	1.0 (33.8)	−1.8 (28.8)	−6.2 (20.8)	−8.8 (16.2)	−12 (10)
Average precipitation mm (inches)	59.0 (2.32)	41.4 (1.63)	46.7 (1.84)	49.2 (1.94)	48.0 (1.89)	53.4 (2.10)	47.6 (1.87)	62.1 (2.44)	54.7 (2.15)	58.1 (2.29)	67.2 (2.65)	63.6 (2.50)	651.0 (25.63)
Mean monthly sunshine hours	62.6	79.4	121.5	152.7	194.1	193.8	186.3	178.9	135.6	105.7	76.5	53.3	1,540.4
Source: MetOffice

== Transport ==
=== Road ===
Amble is situated on the A1068 that runs along the north-eastern coastline. This road is the old corn trading road which runs from Hexham in south west Northumberland through Cramlington, Bedlington, Guide Post, Ashington and Ellington. The road continues through more open coastal areas towards Amble and continues approximately 6 miles (10 km) to the north to Alnmouth, then winds on to Alnwick.

Amble also lies near to the A1, providing easy access to nearest city Newcastle upon Tyne (30 miles (48 km) south), Gateshead (30 miles (48 km) south) and to the Scottish capital Edinburgh (80 miles (130 km) north).

Via road from Amble there are also bus routes directly to towns like Alnwick and Berwick-Upon-Tweed or to the south to Ashington or Morpeth depnding on which bus you take and Newcastle whichever bus you take (Arriva X18 or Arriva X20 )

=== Rail ===
The East Coast Main Line railway between Edinburgh (journey time approximately 1:10) and London (journey time approximately 3:45) runs via the nearby Alnmouth for Alnwick Station or Widdrington Station.

=== Air ===
Newcastle Airport is under an hour's drive from Amble. It provides daily flights to London and regular flights to other UK centres. The airport also operates regular flights to many European destinations, along with destinations in Africa and North America.

== Media ==
=== Television ===
Local news and television programmes are provided by BBC North East and Cumbria and ITV Tyne Tees. Television signals are received from either the Chatton or Pontop Pike TV transmitter.

=== Radio ===
Local radio stations are BBC Radio Newcastle, Heart North East, Capital North East, Smooth North East, Greatest Hits Radio North East, Hits Radio North East, and Koast Radio, a community based radio station.

=== Newspapers ===
The town is served by the newspaper, Northumberland Gazette and The Ambler which is a free independent community paper that is run by volunteers. Its first edition hit the streets in Amble in January 2000.

== Tourism ==
Representations were made in 2006 for Amble to be included in the Northumberland Coast Area of Outstanding Natural Beauty, which ends at the pier. The town is also adjacent to nature reserves operated by Northumberland Wildlife Trust at Cresswell, Druridge and Hauxley.

The town has a caravan park, as well as guest houses and bed and breakfast accommodation for visitors. The Braid, which forms a part of the harbour, is now a greenfield site with a modern marina. In 2009, part of the Braid was legally designated as a Village Green, despite opposition from the council and the withdrawal of the initial application by the person who sought the status.

The nearby Coquet Island is home to many varieties of nesting sea birds, including puffins and the rare Roseate tern. Access is restricted but there are various providers of boat trips around the island. A £10,000 grant was awarded to promote the town with a "Puffin Festival" during the last two weeks of May 2013, when the presence of that species on the island is at its peak. It was hoped that the grant would also encourage local people to use the town's shops.

== Friendliest port ==
In the 1930s, when the RMS Mauretania was heading on her last voyage to the breaker's yard at Rosyth, the town council of Amble sent a telegram to the ship saying "still the finest ship on the seas". The Mauretania replied with greetings "to the last and kindliest port in England".

== Notable people ==
- William Rochester Pape (1831 - 1923) - an English gunsmith who invented and patented the choke boring system, and held the first dog show in Great Britain
- Sir James Calvert Spence (1892–1954) - nutritionist and paediatrician
- Professor Fred Taylor (1934 - 2021) - formerly Professorial Fellow, Jesus College, Oxford and Halley Professor of Physics, University of Oxford. Distinguished Visiting Scientist at NASA's Jet Propulsion Laboratory, California Institute of Technology, Pasadena.
- John Angus (1938 - 2021) - Burnley and England footballer.
- Luke James (1994 -living) - footballer for Peterborough United

== Gallery ==
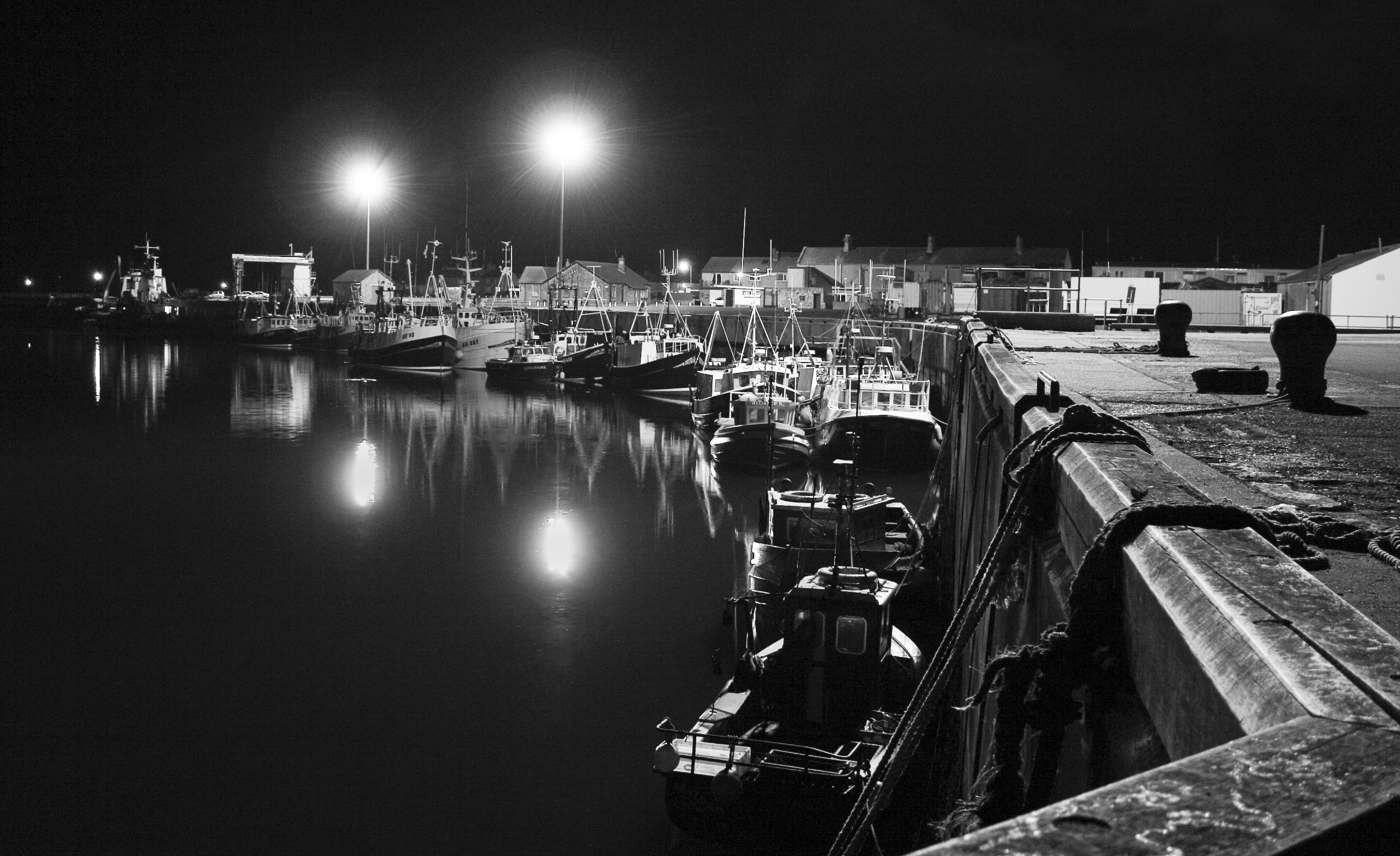
Fishing boats tied up.

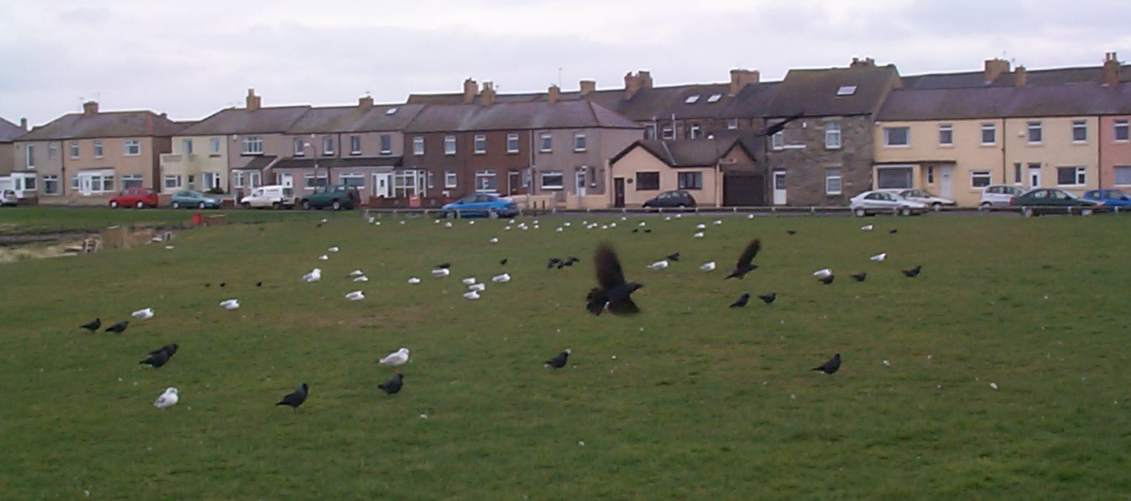
Birds on the grass in the car park leading on to the 'little shore'

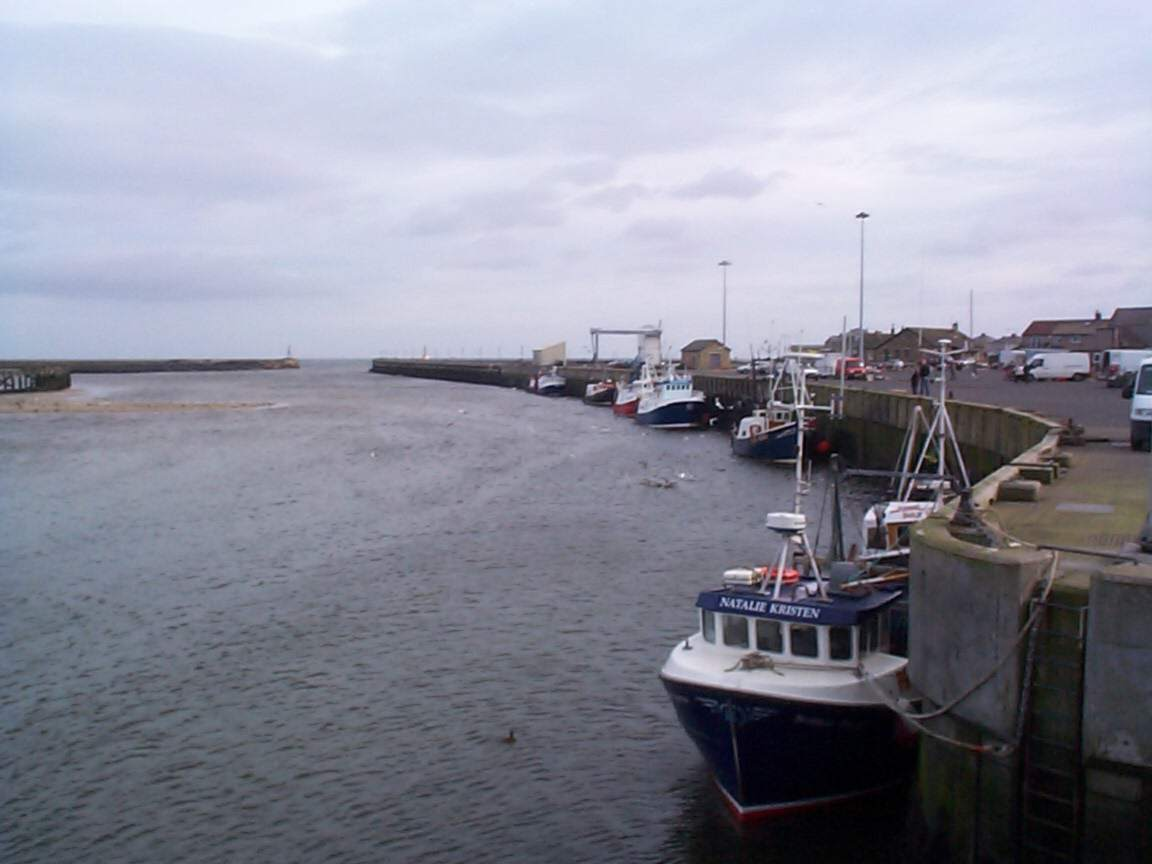
Small fishing boats moored-up.

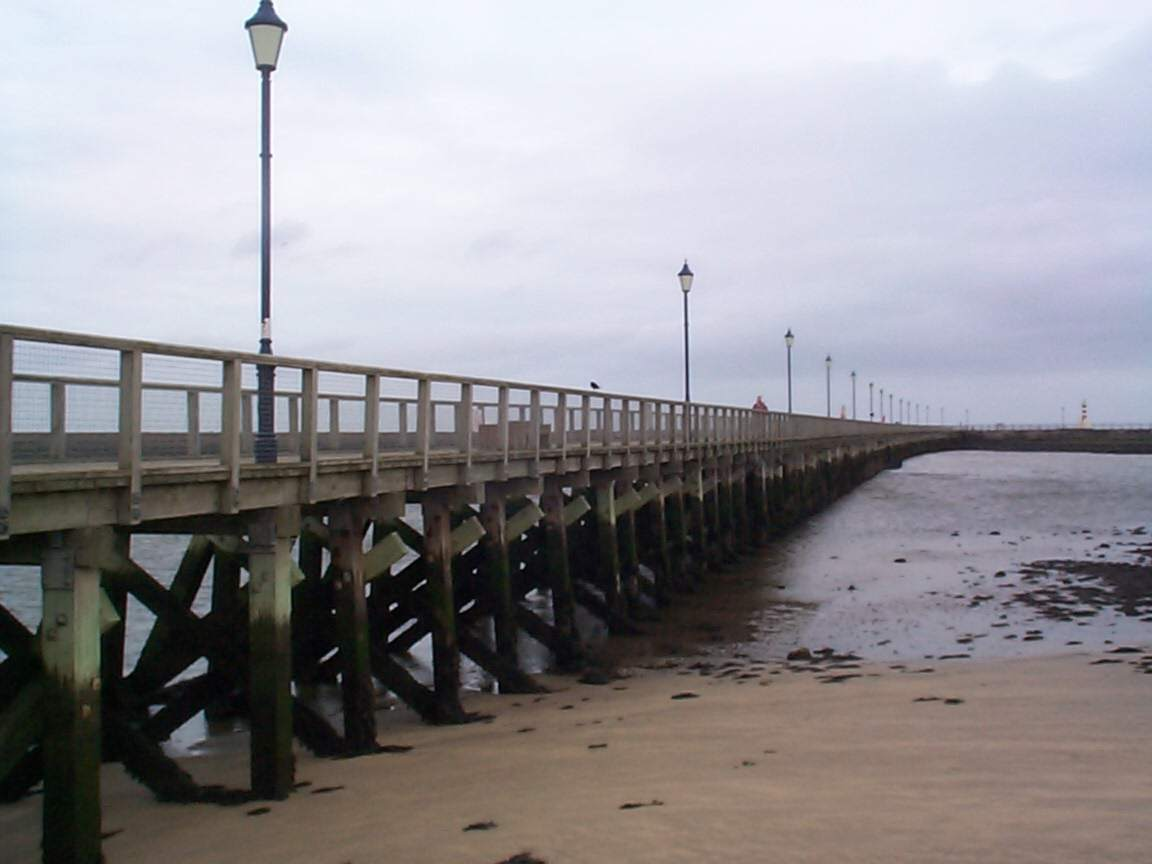
Amble pier

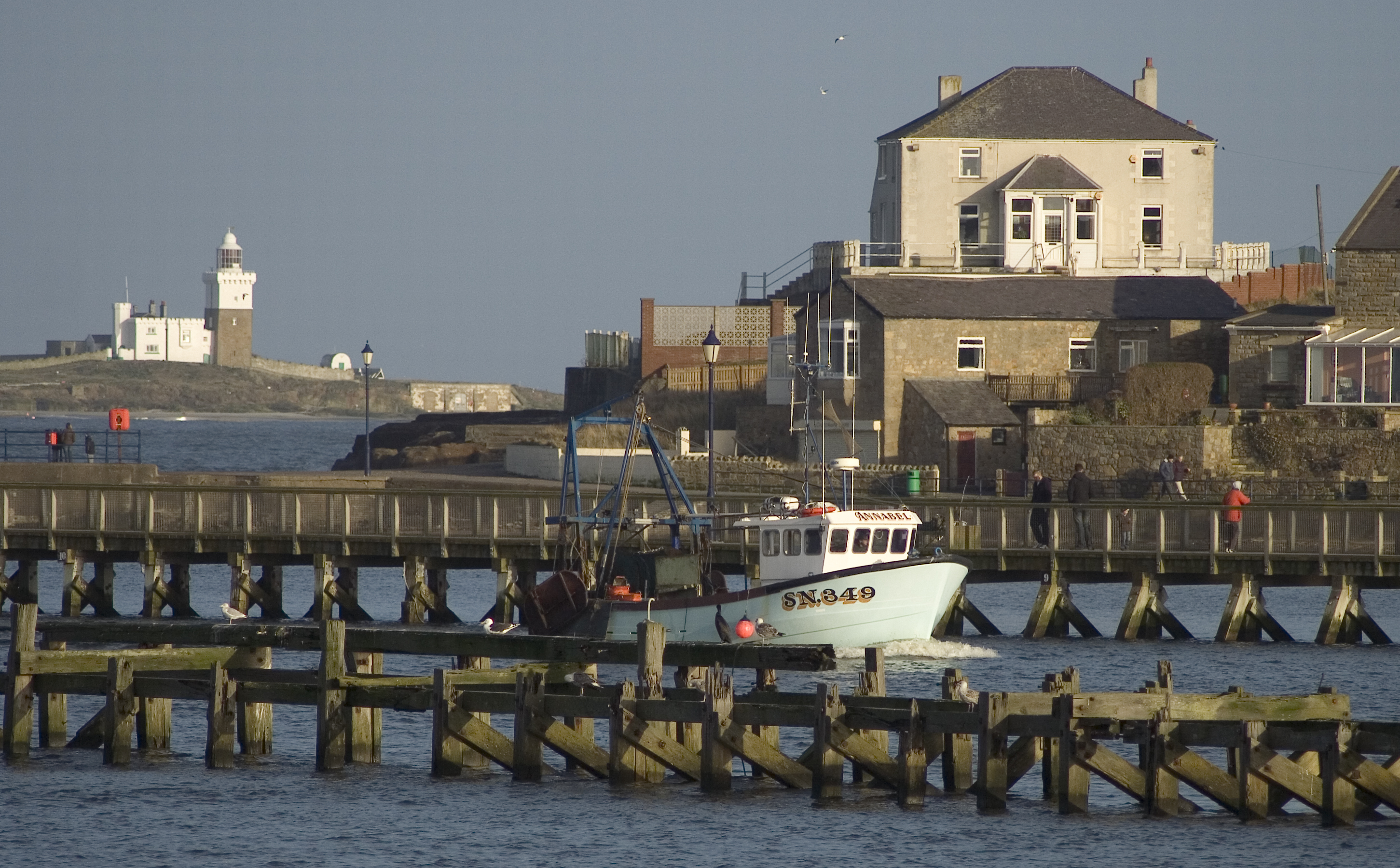
Fishing boat entering Amble Harbour.

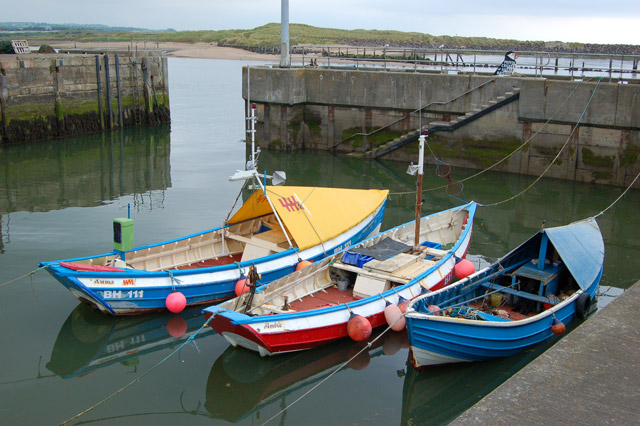
Cobles in the harbour

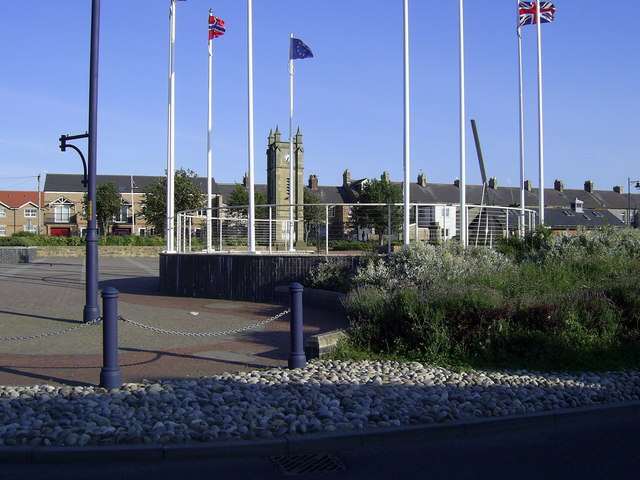
Town square, Amble

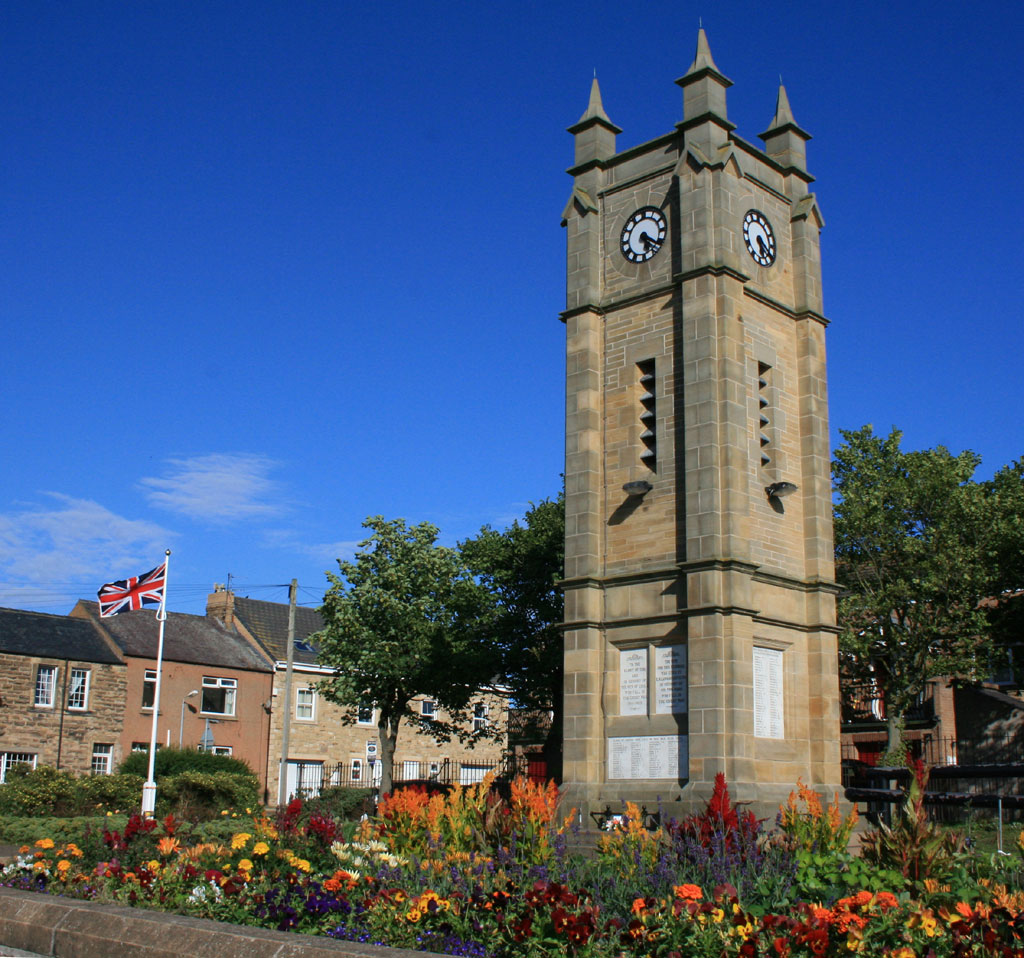
Amble war memorial and clock in the town square

== See also ==
- Amble branch line
- James Calvert Spence College
