= Dongying South railway station =

Railway station in Dongying, Shandong

Dongying South 东营南站
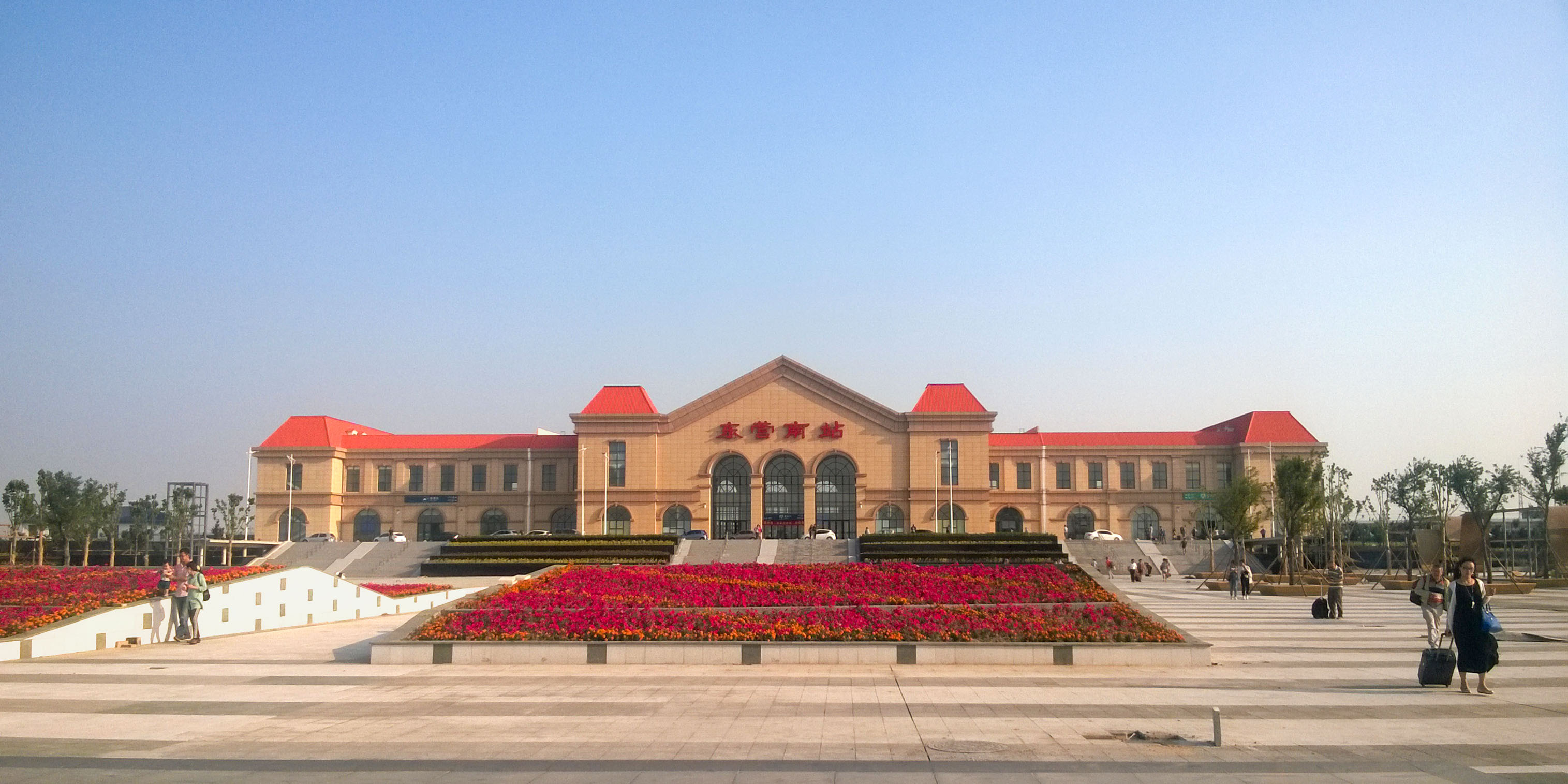

General information
- Location: Dongying District, Dongying, Shandong; China
- Coordinates: 37.356°N 118.545°E
- Lines: Dezhou–Dajiawa railway Tianjin–Weifang HSR (u/c)
- Platforms: 3

History
- Opened: September 28, 2015
Location

Dongying South railway station (Chinese: 东营南站) is a railway station in Dongying District, Dongying, Shandong, China.

The freight-only Huanghua–Dajiawa railway passes between the station building and platforms, but does not have a stop here.

== History ==
The station opened with the Dezhou–Dajiawa railway on 28 September 2015.

== See also ==
- Dongying railway station
