= Dongying =

Dongying 东营市
- Prefecture-level city
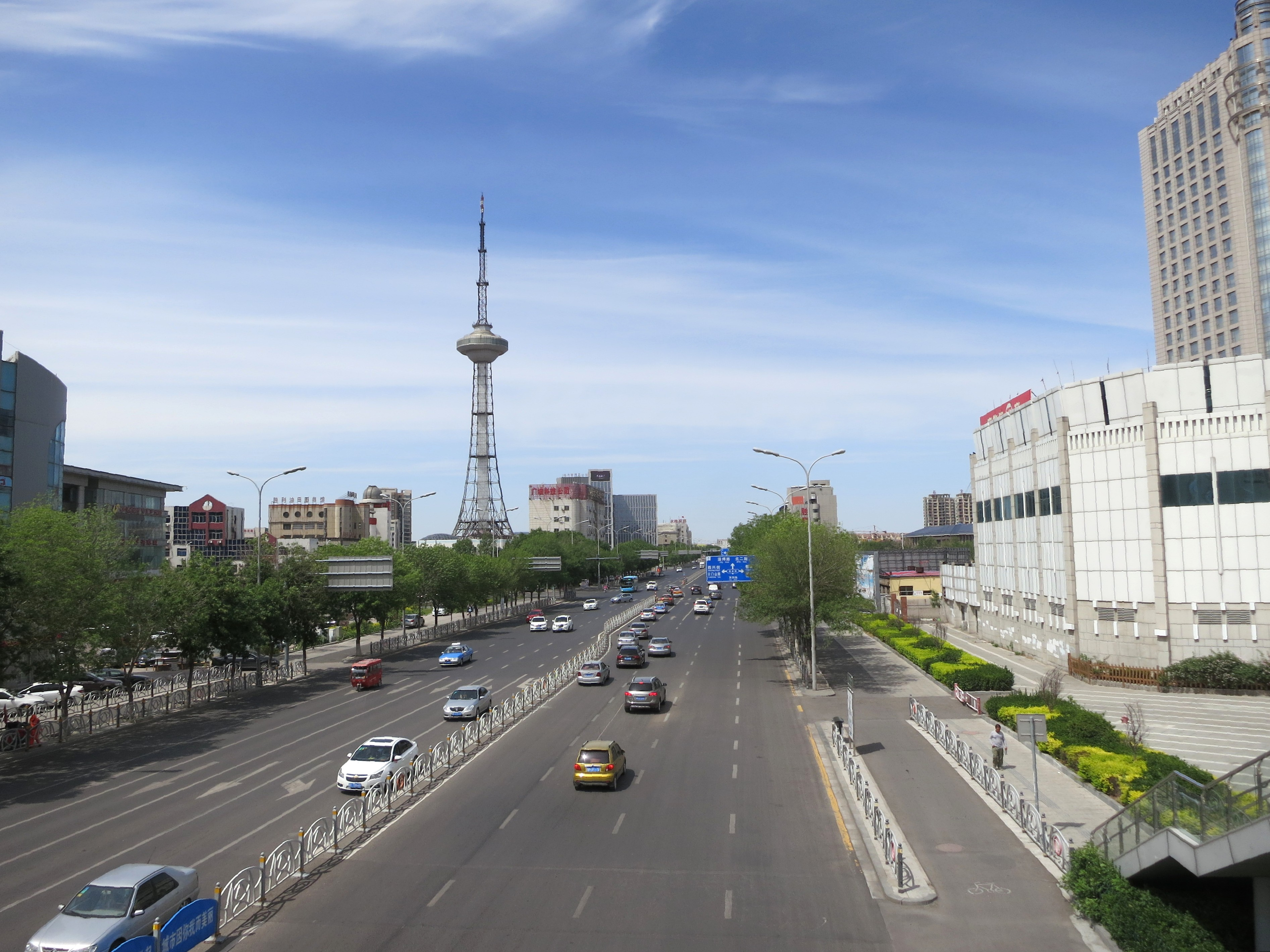
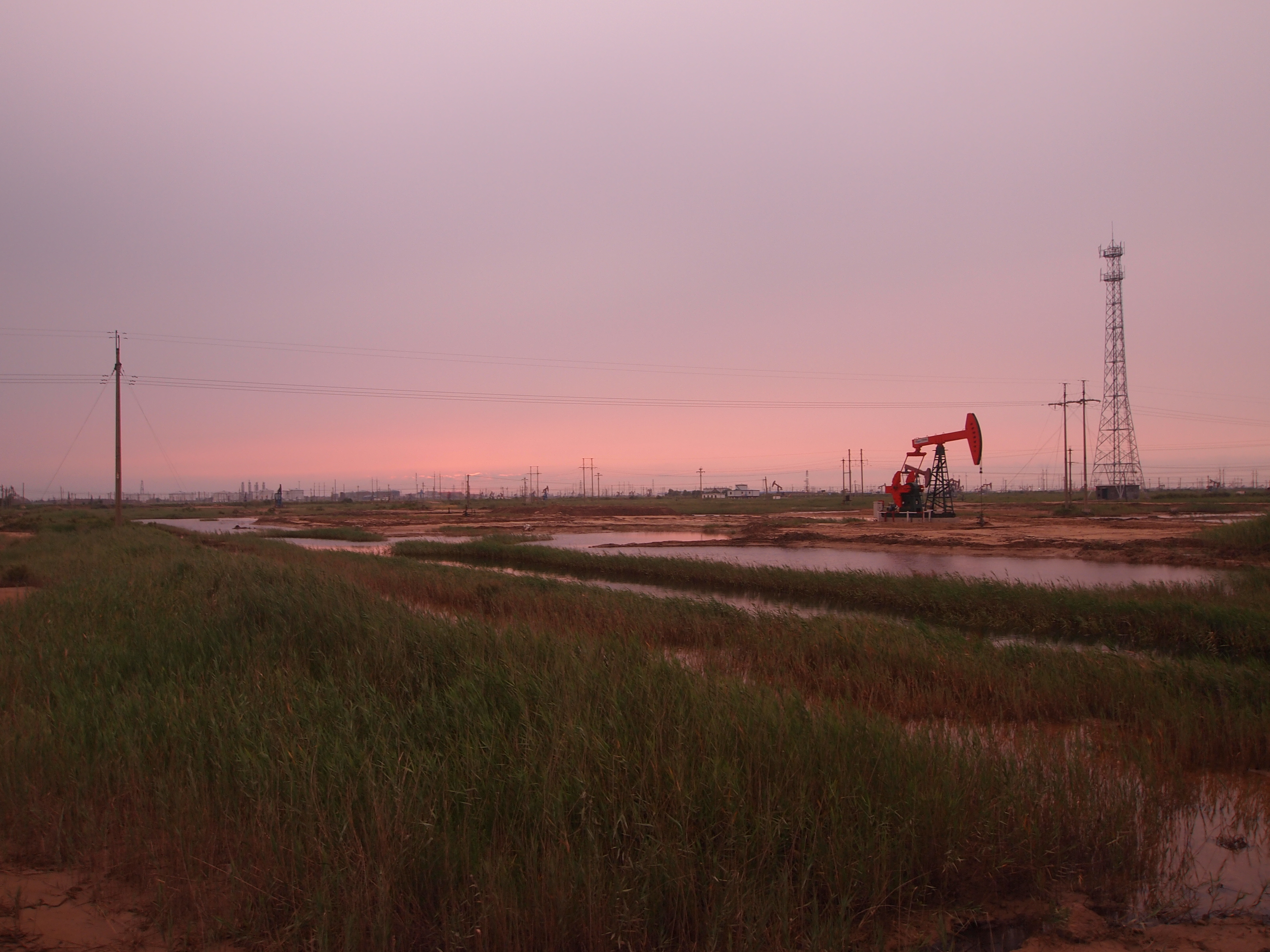
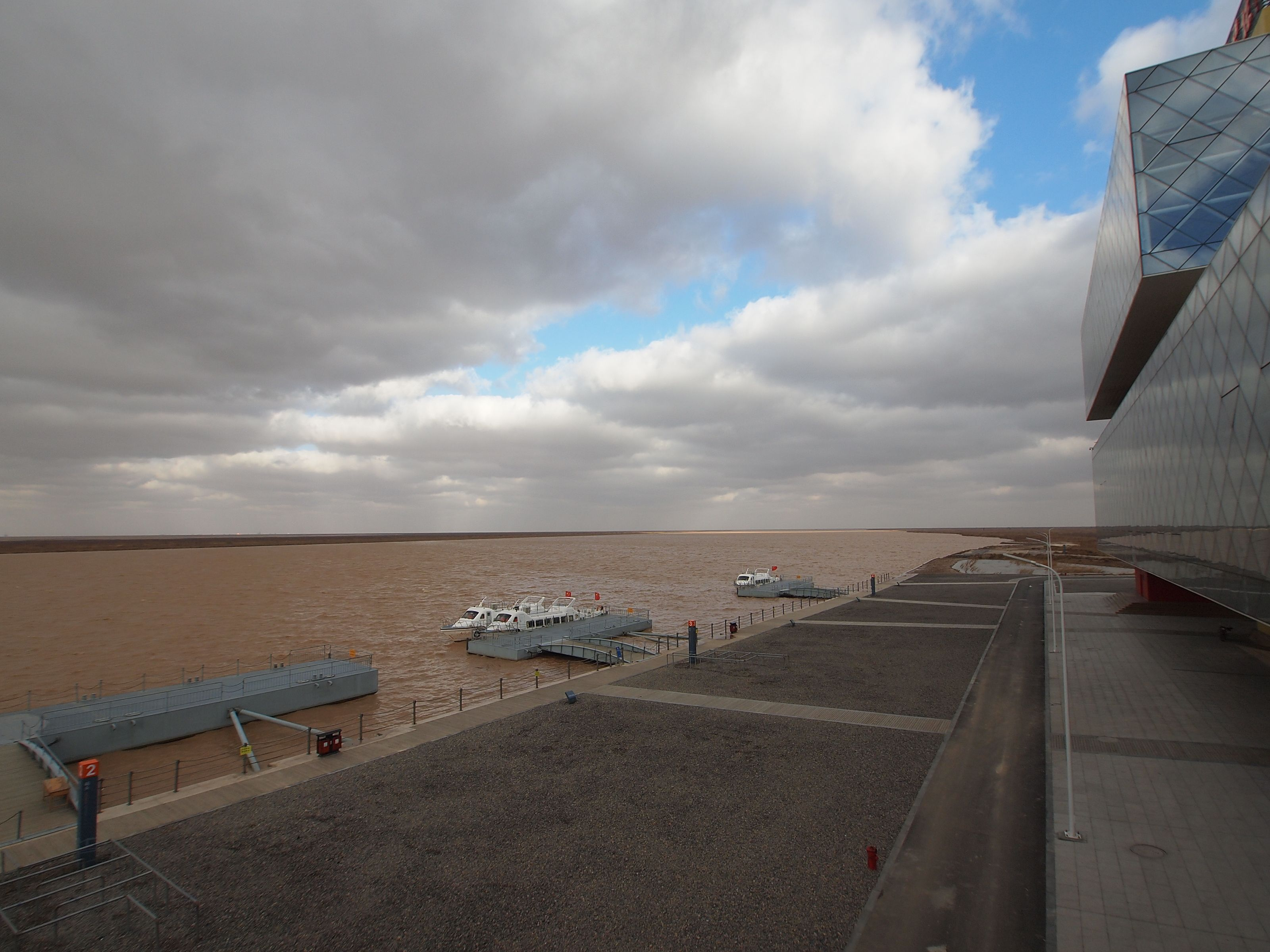
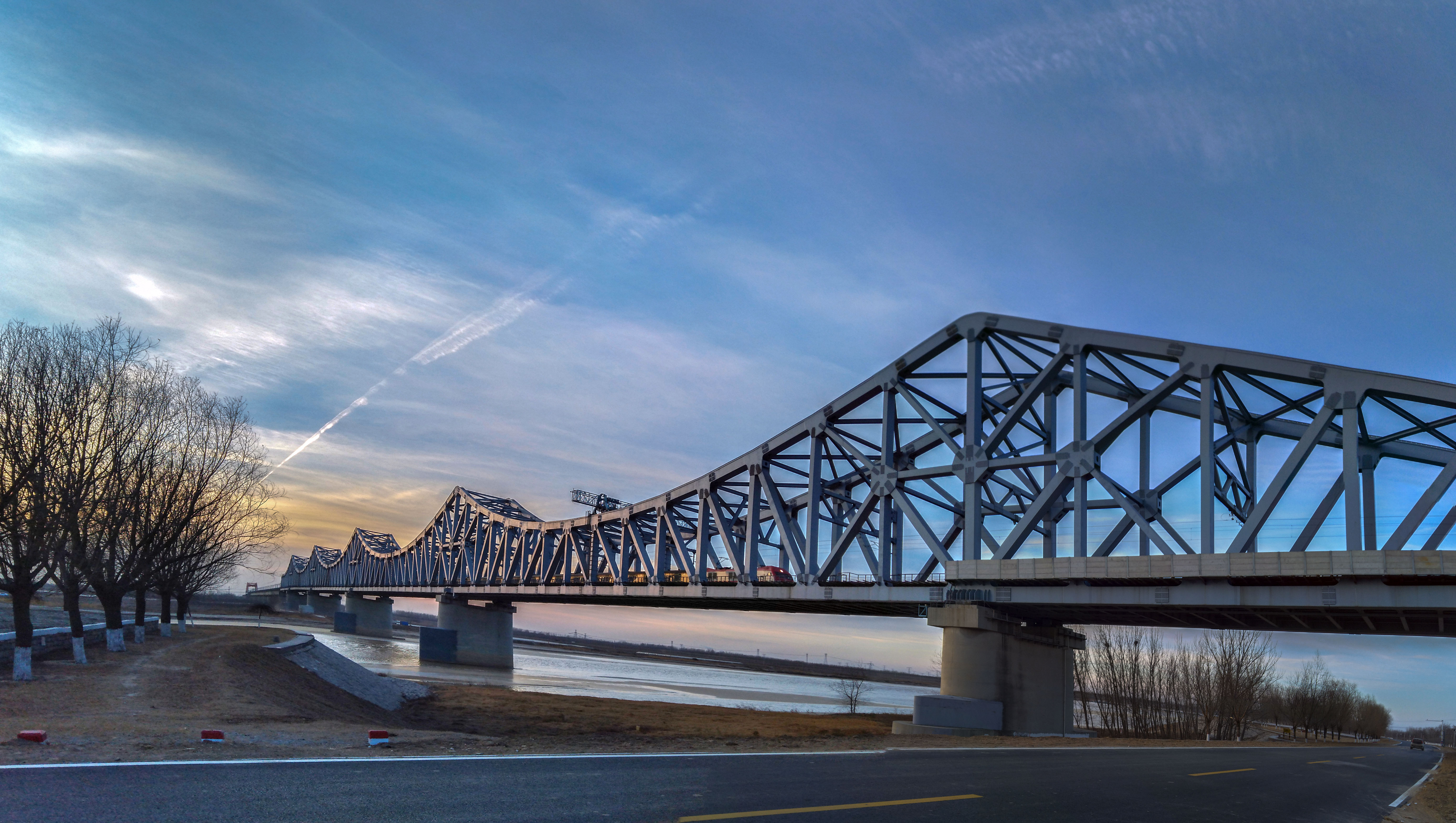
- Downtown Dongying Shengli Oil Field Yellow River Mouth Dezhou-Dajiawa Railway Bridge

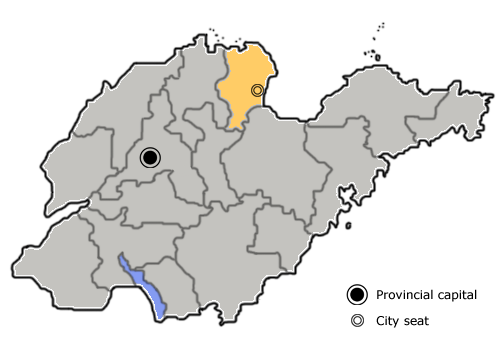
- Location of Dongying City administration in Shandong
- Interactive map of Dongying
- Location in China
- Coordinates (Dongying municipal government): 37°26′02″N 118°40′29″E
- Country: People's Republic of China
- Province: Shandong
- County-level divisions: 5
- Township-level divisions: 43
- Municipal seat: Dongying District

Government
  - CPC Secretary: Shen Changyou (申长友)
  - Mayor: Zhao HaoZhi (赵豪志)

Area
  - Prefecture-level city: 7,923.26 km^{2} (3,059.19 sq mi)
  - Urban: 5,724.8 km^{2} (2,210.4 sq mi)
  - Metro: 3,359.7 km^{2} (1,297.2 sq mi)

Population (2020 census)
  - Prefecture-level city: 2,193,518
  - Density: 276.845/km^{2} (717.026/sq mi)
  - Urban: 1,433,587
  - Urban density: 250.42/km^{2} (648.58/sq mi)
  - Metro: 1,188,656
  - Metro density: 353.80/km^{2} (916.33/sq mi)

GDP
  - Prefecture-level city: CN¥ 415 billion US$ 62.7 billion
  - Per capita: CN¥ 191,946; US$ 29,006
- Time zone: UTC+8 (China Standard)
- Postal code: 257000
- Area code: 546
- ISO 3166 code: CN-SD-05
- License Plate Prefix: 鲁E
- Website: www.dongying.gov.cn

Dongying (simplified Chinese: 东营; traditional Chinese: 東營; pinyin: Dōngyíng), is a prefecture-level city on the northern (Bohai Sea) coast of Shandong province, People's Republic of China. As of the 2020 census, 2,193,518 people resided within its administrative area of 7,923.26 km^{2} (3,059.19 sq mi) and 1,188,656 in the built-up area made up of Dongying and Kenli districts. Dongying is home to the Shengli Oilfield, which after the Daqing oilfield is the second largest oilfield in China.

== Administration ==
The prefecture-level city of Dongying administers five county-level divisions, including three districts and two counties:

- Dongying District (东营区)
- Hekou District (河口区)
- Kenli District (垦利区)
- Guangrao County (广饶县)
- Lijin County (利津县)

Map
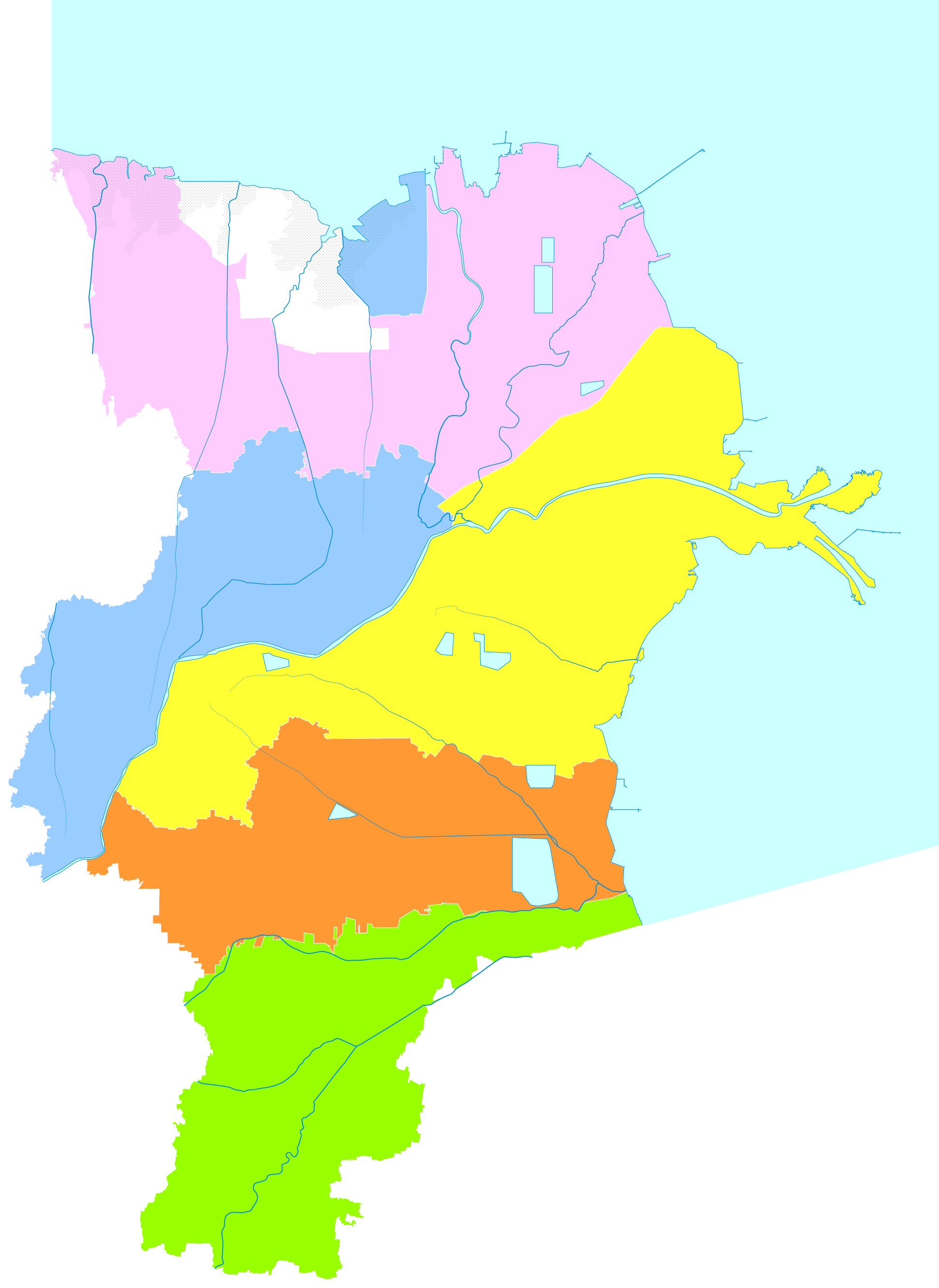

These are further divided into 43 township-level divisions, including 23 towns, 13 townships and seven subdistricts.

== History ==
The city was established in 1983, as a base for developing the Yellow River Delta and China's second largest oilfield, Shengli Field. It was named after the establishment of Dongying and Xiying camps during the Eastern Expedition by Emperor Taizong of the Tang Dynasty. Later, Dongying Village was formed, and in 1964, the headquarters of the North China Petroleum Exploration Battle was established in this village. The following year, the Dongying Office in the Huimin area was established here. In 1982, the State Council approved the establishment of a prefecture level city, named "Dongying".

== Geography ==
Dongying is located on the banks of the Yellow River Delta of Northern Shandong Province. Bordering prefectures are:

- Binzhou to the west
- Zibo to the southwest
- Weifang to the south

The city is located at 36° 55'–38° 10' N latitude and 118° 07′–119° 10' E longitude, and has a total area of 7,923 square kilometres (3,059 sq mi). The city's 350 km (220 mi) coastline borders Laizhou Bay and Bohai Bay to the east and north respectively.

=== Climate ===
Dongying City is located at mid latitudes, facing away from the land and sea, and is influenced by both the Eurasian continent and the Pacific Ocean. Dongying has a monsoon-influenced, four-season humid continental climate Köppen Dwa), with hot, humid summers, and cold but dry winters. The city is dry and nearly rainless in spring, hot and rainy in summer, crisp in autumn and dry and cold (with little snow) in winter. The average annual temperature is 13.5 °C (56.3 °F), and the annual precipitation is 527.7 millimetres (20.8 in), with a strong summer maximum, and high variability from year to year. January is the coldest and driest month, with a mean temperature of −2.2 °C (28.0 °F) and 5.1 mm (0.20 in) of equivalent rainfall. July is the hottest and wettest month; the corresponding numbers are 27.0 °C (80.6 °F), and 136.7 mm (5.38 in).

Climate data for Dongying, elevation 6 m (20 ft), (1991–2020 normals, extremes 1971–present)
Month	Jan	Feb	Mar	Apr	May	Jun	Jul	Aug	Sep	Oct	Nov	Dec	Year
Record high °C (°F)	17.3 (63.1)	26.0 (78.8)	30.0 (86.0)	34.3 (93.7)	40.7 (105.3)	41.4 (106.5)	40.3 (104.5)	38.5 (101.3)	36.8 (98.2)	32.6 (90.7)	26.3 (79.3)	21.0 (69.8)	41.4 (106.5)
Mean daily maximum °C (°F)	2.9 (37.2)	6.4 (43.5)	13.1 (55.6)	20.6 (69.1)	26.4 (79.5)	30.2 (86.4)	31.6 (88.9)	30.5 (86.9)	26.9 (80.4)	20.6 (69.1)	12.3 (54.1)	5.0 (41.0)	18.9 (66.0)
Daily mean °C (°F)	−1.6 (29.1)	1.4 (34.5)	7.3 (45.1)	14.4 (57.9)	20.7 (69.3)	24.9 (76.8)	27.3 (81.1)	26.5 (79.7)	22.1 (71.8)	15.3 (59.5)	7.4 (45.3)	0.6 (33.1)	13.9 (56.9)
Mean daily minimum °C (°F)	−4.9 (23.2)	−2.3 (27.9)	2.9 (37.2)	9.5 (49.1)	15.7 (60.3)	20.5 (68.9)	23.8 (74.8)	23.2 (73.8)	18.2 (64.8)	11.2 (52.2)	3.7 (38.7)	−2.6 (27.3)	9.9 (49.9)
Record low °C (°F)	−17.6 (0.3)	−20.2 (−4.4)	−8.9 (16.0)	−2.0 (28.4)	3.8 (38.8)	10.6 (51.1)	14.8 (58.6)	14.6 (58.3)	7.9 (46.2)	−1.5 (29.3)	−10.3 (13.5)	−16.4 (2.5)	−20.2 (−4.4)
Average precipitation mm (inches)	5.0 (0.20)	10.5 (0.41)	9.7 (0.38)	25.3 (1.00)	51.2 (2.02)	81.7 (3.22)	140.2 (5.52)	164.7 (6.48)	40.0 (1.57)	27.1 (1.07)	21.6 (0.85)	6.4 (0.25)	583.4 (22.97)
Average precipitation days (≥ 0.1 mm)	2.2	3.0	3.0	5.1	6.1	7.7	10.8	10.2	5.7	5.1	4.2	3.1	66.2
Average snowy days	4.1	3.5	1.4	0.1	0	0	0	0	0	0	1.0	3.0	13.1
Average relative humidity (%)	60	58	53	53	57	63	74	76	69	64	63	61	63
Mean monthly sunshine hours	178.8	179.7	228.5	246.9	273.5	246.0	213.3	216.3	214.1	205.2	172.6	170.3	2,545.2
Percentage possible sunshine	58	58	61	62	62	56	48	52	58	60	57	57	57
Source 1: China Meteorological Administrationall-time February high
Source 2: Weather China

== Economy ==
A large part of the city's economy revolves around petroleum and the nearby Shengli Oil Field.

Industries include petroleum, petrochemistry, saline chemistry, papermaking, machinery, electronics, construction, building materials, foodstuff processing, pneumatic tires and rubber, textiles, and light industries.

Dongying is one of the world's leading producers of rubber tires. With the release of the 2023 ERJ Global Tire Ranking, a total of 36 tire companies from China appear on the list, accounting for nearly 50%. Among them, the number of Shandong tire companies on the list has reached 21, accounting for nearly 60% of China's listed tire companies; Sales account for 51% of domestic tire companies.As one of the main concentration areas of Shandong's tire industry, Dongying has a total of 7 tire companies listed on the latest Top 75 list, with 6 of them showing a significant leap in ranking; Two tire companies also achieved high sales growth in the industry headwinds of 2022.

The city's growing manufacturing sector and its proximity to oil reserves have led to increased company investments. An example is DuPont, which invested five billion yuan in 2005 to build a titanium dioxide factory in the area. After this project's completion, it became the largest investment outside of the US for DuPont.

== Culture ==
Dongying History Museum (Guangrao County History Museum) is a comprehensive museum of geography established in May 1993. It is a national second level museum and AAA level tourist attraction, including a comprehensive building and Sun Wu Temple. It covers a total area of 42763 square meters and currently has more than 12000 collections, including 417 precious cultural relics above the national third level (pieces/sets).

The Sun Tzu Cultural Tourism Area is located in the Chengdong New District of Guangrao County, Dongying City. Based on the standards of national level ecological tourism demonstration areas and tourist resorts, it is a cultural experiential tourism and vacation project with Sun Tzu culture as its theme, created according to the functional positioning of ecology, tourism, culture, and city. In August 2012, it was rated as a national 4A level tourist attraction.

== Transportation ==
- Zibo–Dongying railway (Dongying railway station)
- Dongying South Railway Station
- Dezhou–Dajiawa railway (passenger service available at Dongying South railway station)
- Dongying Port railway (freight only)
- Dongying Shengli Airport

A new bus station (东营市汽车总站; Dōngyíng Shì qìchē Zǒng Zhàn) was built between the east and west sides of the city, on Huanghe Road (黄河路; Huánghé Lù). Connections to Beijing, Qingdao and Jinan, among many other cities are available on a daily basis.

== Education ==
Dongying is home to one major university, the China University of Petroleum, as well as several colleges and technical schools. There are also many top high schools located in Dongying, one of those is Shengli Oilfield No.1 Middle School. Founded in 1965, rated as the most successful middle and high schools in China in a research hold by Beijing University in 2014, it is the first provincial standardized school in Shandong Province. There are 114 classes in the school with more than 5,300 students.

== Incidents ==
=== 2015 Dongying Explosion ===
On 31 August 2015, an explosion occurred at a chemical plant in Dongying. Thirteen people died and several were detained by authorities. According to Dongying municipal party media reports, the accident occurred at Binyuan Chemical Company in Diaokou Township, Lijin County. An explosion occurred late at night on Monday (August 31), and the flames were extinguished in the early morning of Tuesday (September 1).

According to a report released by a state-run news website, the accident resulted in one death, and the relevant company leaders have been brought under control.

== Sister cities ==
Dongying is twinned with:

- Midland, Texas, United States
- Samcheok, Gangwon-do, South Korea
- Madisonville, Kentucky, United States
