= Beisong =

Beisong 北宋镇
- Town
- Location in Shandong Beisong (China)
- Coordinates: 37°27′48″N 118°08′49″E
- Country: People's Republic of China
- Province: Shandong
- Prefecture-level city: Dongying
- County: Lijin County
- Time zone: UTC+8 (China Standard)

Beisong (Chinese: 北宋; pinyin: Běisòng) is a town in Lijin County, Dongying, Shandong province, China. As of 2020, it had two miner's residential communities and 72 villages under its administration:

Miner's communities

- Shengli Oilfield Binnan Second Mine (胜利油田滨南二矿)
- Shengli Oilfield Binnan Third Mine (胜利油田滨南三矿)

Villages

- Beisong Village
- Wazhang Village (洼张村)
- Yangdong Village (杨董村)
- Daniu Village (大牛村)
- Qianwang Village (前王村)
- Houwang Village (后王村)
- Zhaijia Village (翟家村)
- Pohan Village (坡韩村)
- Jiajia Village (贾家村)
- Jianliu Village (鉴刘村)
- Wujia Village (吴家村)
- Shanjia Village (单家村)
- Rentian Village (任田村)
- Chuguan Village (褚官村)
- Bojiliujia Village (簸箕刘家村)
- Liangjia Village (梁家村)
- Wangjia Village (王家村)
- Zhangjia Village (张家村)
- Qianlin Village (前林村)
- Zhonglin Village (中林村)
- Houliu Village (后刘村)
- Houwang Village (侯王村)
- Caiyu Village (菜于村)
- Bianjia Village (边家村)
- Liugao Village (柳高村)
- Majia Village (马家村)
- Dagai Village (大盖村)
- Xiaoguo Village (小郭村)
- Dawang Village (大王村)
- Dao'an Village (道庵村)
- Xisun Village (西孙村)
- Sanhe Village (三合村)
- Yinjia Village (殷家村)
- Guili Village (贵李村)
- Yujia Village (于家村)
- Xujia Village (许家村)
- Daijia Village (戴家村)
- Dongjia Village (董家村)
- Xiaoma Village (小马村)
- Fengjia Village (冯家村)
- Houcui Village (后崔村)
- Liucheng Village (刘城村)
- Linjia Village (林家村)
- Xiajia Village (夏家村)
- Hougong Village (后宫村)
- Qiangong Village (前宫村)
- Wuzhuang Village (五庄村)
- Situ Village (四图村)
- Zhangpanma Village (张潘马村)
- Shuanghe Village (双合村)
- Hetaoli Village (河套李村)
- Nansong Village (南宋村)
- Xianglishang Village (乡李上村)
- Xianglixia Village (乡李下村)
- Chuanwang Village (船王村)
- Zaohuwang Village (皂户王村)
- Nianli Village (碾李村)
- Songji Village (宋集村)
- Panjia Village (潘家村)
- Hanjia Village (韩家村)
- Daocha Village (道岔村)
- Liujia Village (刘家村)
- Sancha Village (三岔村)
- Gaojia Village (高家村)
- Shimen Village (石门村)
- Tanqushanjia Village (滩区单家村)
- Dingjia Village (丁家村)
- Fangzi Village (坊子村)
- Tongjia Village (佟家村)
- Nanjiajia Village (南贾家村)
- Dongwang Village (董王村)
- Qiancui Village (前崔村)

== See also ==
- List of township-level divisions of Shandong
