= Kenli, Dongying =

Kenli 垦利区
- District
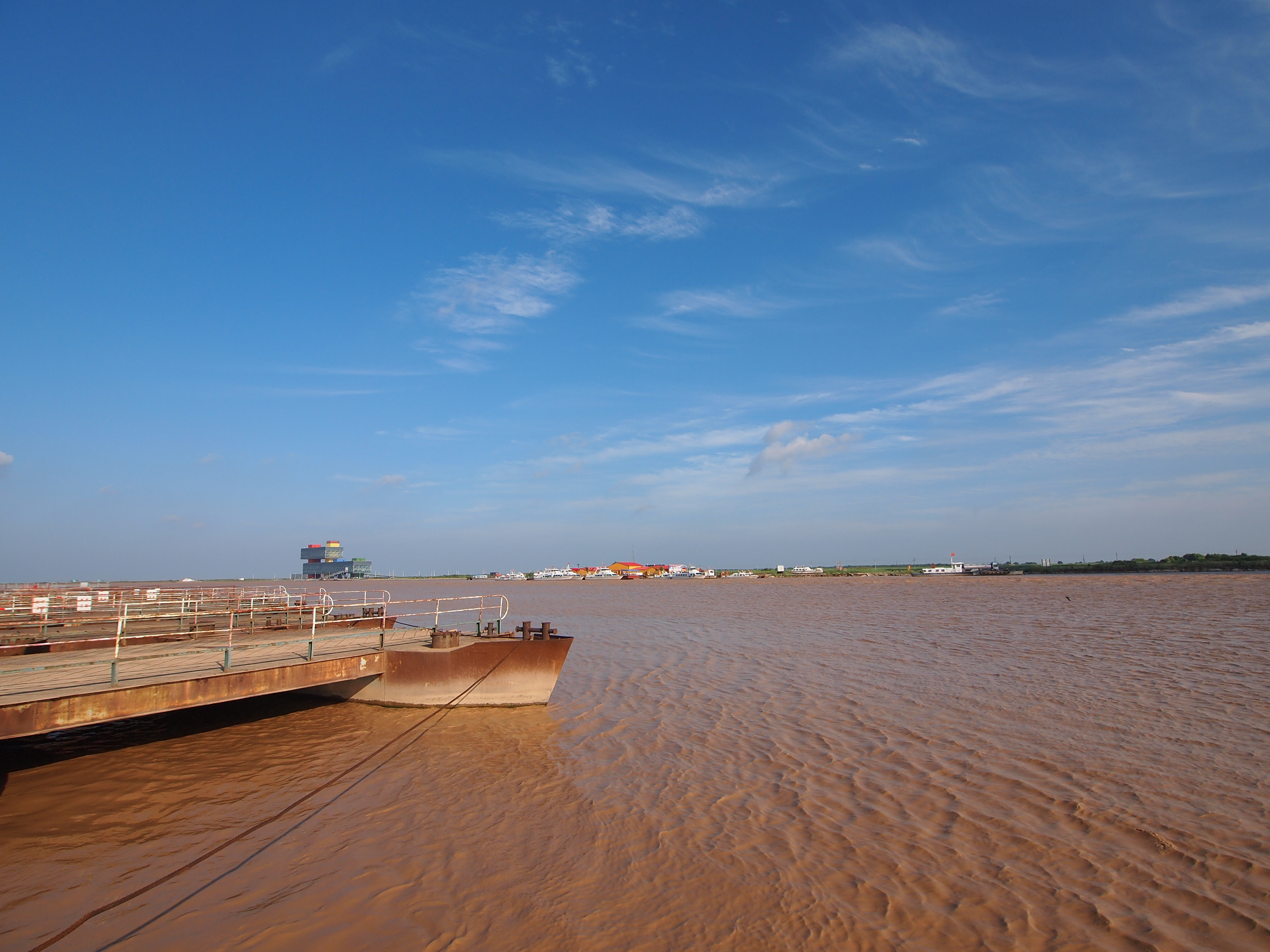
- Yellow River mouth

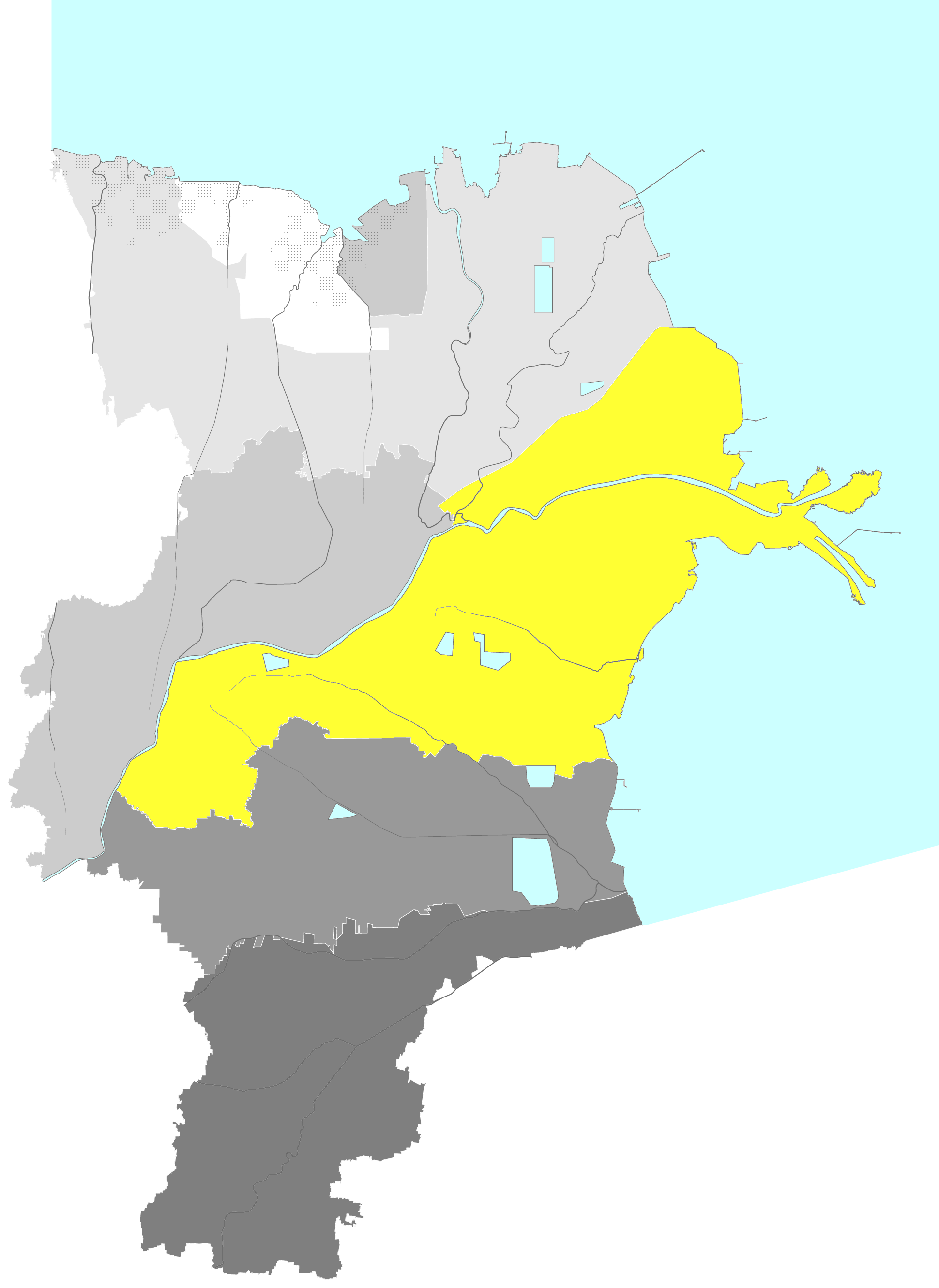
- Location in Dongying

- Location in Shandong
- Coordinates: 37°34′19″N 118°34′30″E
- Country: People's Republic of China
- Province: Shandong
- Prefecture-level city: Dongying

Area
  - Total: 2,331 km^{2} (900 sq mi)
- Elevation: 7.6 m (25 ft)

Population (2019)
  - Total: 238,900
  - Density: 102.5/km^{2} (265.4/sq mi)
- Time zone: UTC+8 (China Standard)
- Postal code: 257500
- Website: www.kenli.gov.cn

Kenli District (simplified Chinese: 垦利区; traditional Chinese: 墾利區; pinyin: Kěnlì Qū) is a district of the city of Dongying, in northern Shandong province. The district includes the mouth of the Yellow River. As of 2019, Kenli District has a population of 238,900.

== History ==
Kenli was established as a county in 1959.

In June 2016, Kenli was upgraded to a district.

== Geography ==
The mouth of the Yellow River is located in Kenli District, and flows through the district for 118 kilometres (73 mi). Other major rivers in the district include the Xiaodao River (Chinese: 小岛河), the Yongfeng River (Chinese: 永丰河), the Yihong River (Chinese: 溢洪河), and the Guangli River.

=== Climate ===
The average annual temperature is 12.3 °C (54.1 °F), and the average annual precipitation is 538.4 millimetres (21.20 in).

Climate data for Kenli, elevation 9 m (30 ft), (1991–2020 normals, extremes 1981–present)
Month	Jan	Feb	Mar	Apr	May	Jun	Jul	Aug	Sep	Oct	Nov	Dec	Year
Record high °C (°F)	17.2 (63.0)	22.6 (72.7)	30.3 (86.5)	33.8 (92.8)	39.2 (102.6)	40.5 (104.9)	39.1 (102.4)	38.1 (100.6)	35.6 (96.1)	31.4 (88.5)	25.6 (78.1)	19.7 (67.5)	40.5 (104.9)
Mean daily maximum °C (°F)	3.0 (37.4)	6.5 (43.7)	13.2 (55.8)	20.7 (69.3)	26.6 (79.9)	30.4 (86.7)	31.8 (89.2)	30.6 (87.1)	27.1 (80.8)	20.7 (69.3)	12.2 (54.0)	5.0 (41.0)	19.0 (66.2)
Daily mean °C (°F)	−1.9 (28.6)	1.1 (34.0)	7.2 (45.0)	14.4 (57.9)	20.7 (69.3)	25.0 (77.0)	27.3 (81.1)	26.3 (79.3)	22 (72)	15.1 (59.2)	7.1 (44.8)	0.3 (32.5)	13.7 (56.7)
Mean daily minimum °C (°F)	−5.3 (22.5)	−2.7 (27.1)	2.5 (36.5)	9.2 (48.6)	15.4 (59.7)	20.2 (68.4)	23.5 (74.3)	22.9 (73.2)	17.8 (64.0)	10.7 (51.3)	3.2 (37.8)	−3.1 (26.4)	9.5 (49.1)
Record low °C (°F)	−15.6 (3.9)	−13.2 (8.2)	−7.4 (18.7)	−1.3 (29.7)	4.7 (40.5)	10.6 (51.1)	17.1 (62.8)	14.8 (58.6)	6.7 (44.1)	−0.9 (30.4)	−9.2 (15.4)	−15.6 (3.9)	−15.6 (3.9)
Average precipitation mm (inches)	4.6 (0.18)	9.4 (0.37)	8.3 (0.33)	23.5 (0.93)	46.3 (1.82)	82.4 (3.24)	171.9 (6.77)	145.6 (5.73)	36.1 (1.42)	27.1 (1.07)	20.1 (0.79)	5.7 (0.22)	581 (22.87)
Average precipitation days (≥ 0.1 mm)	2.1	2.8	3.1	5.4	5.9	7.6	10.9	9.8	5.7	5.0	3.8	2.5	64.6
Average snowy days	3.3	3.1	1.1	0.1	0	0	0	0	0	0	0.7	2.4	10.7
Average relative humidity (%)	61	58	52	52	56	63	74	77	69	65	64	62	63
Mean monthly sunshine hours	181.8	182.0	231.7	248.1	276.6	252.4	216.3	215.4	216.9	208.0	172.7	171.1	2,573
Percentage possible sunshine	59	59	62	62	63	57	49	52	59	61	57	58	58
Source: China Meteorological Administration all-time August record

== Administrative divisions ==
As of 2020, Kenli District is divided into 2 subdistricts, 5 towns, and 4 township-level equivalents.

=== Subdistricts ===
- Kenli Subdistrict (Chinese: 垦利街道)
- Xinglong Subdistrict (Chinese: 兴隆街道)

=== Towns ===
- Shengtuo (Chinese: 胜坨镇)
- Haojia (Chinese: 郝家镇)
- Yong'an (Chinese: 永安镇)
- Huanghekou (Chinese: 黄河口镇)
- Dongji (Chinese: 董集镇)

== Demographics ==
According to Harvard University's China Historical GIS, Kenli had a population of 211,444 in 1999.

In the 2000 Chinese Census, Kenli had a recorded population of 242,654.

== Transportation ==
=== Air ===
Dongying Shengli Airport is located in the southeast of Kenli District.

=== Rail ===
The Zibo–Dongying railway passes through the district.
