= Dongying Port railway =

Single-track railway line in China

Overview
- Native name: 东营港疏港铁路
- Status: Operational
- Termini: Lijin South; Dongying Port

Service
- Type: Heavy rail

History
- Opened: 28 September 2020

Technical
- Line length: 114.2 km (71 mi)
- Track gauge: 1,435 mm (4 ft 8 1/2 in) standard gauge

The Dongying Port railway is a single-track freight-only railway line in China. It opened on 28 September 2020.

== History ==
Tracklaying was completed on 31 December 2019.

== Route ==
The line is 114.2 kilometres (71.0 mi) long. It departs from the Dezhou–Dajiawa railway east of Lijin South and heads north. A chord connects the line with the Huanghua–Dajiawa railway. The line has connected Dongying Port and Dongying Datang power station to the railway network.
