= Dongying railway station =

Railway station in Dongying, Shandong

Dongying 东营站
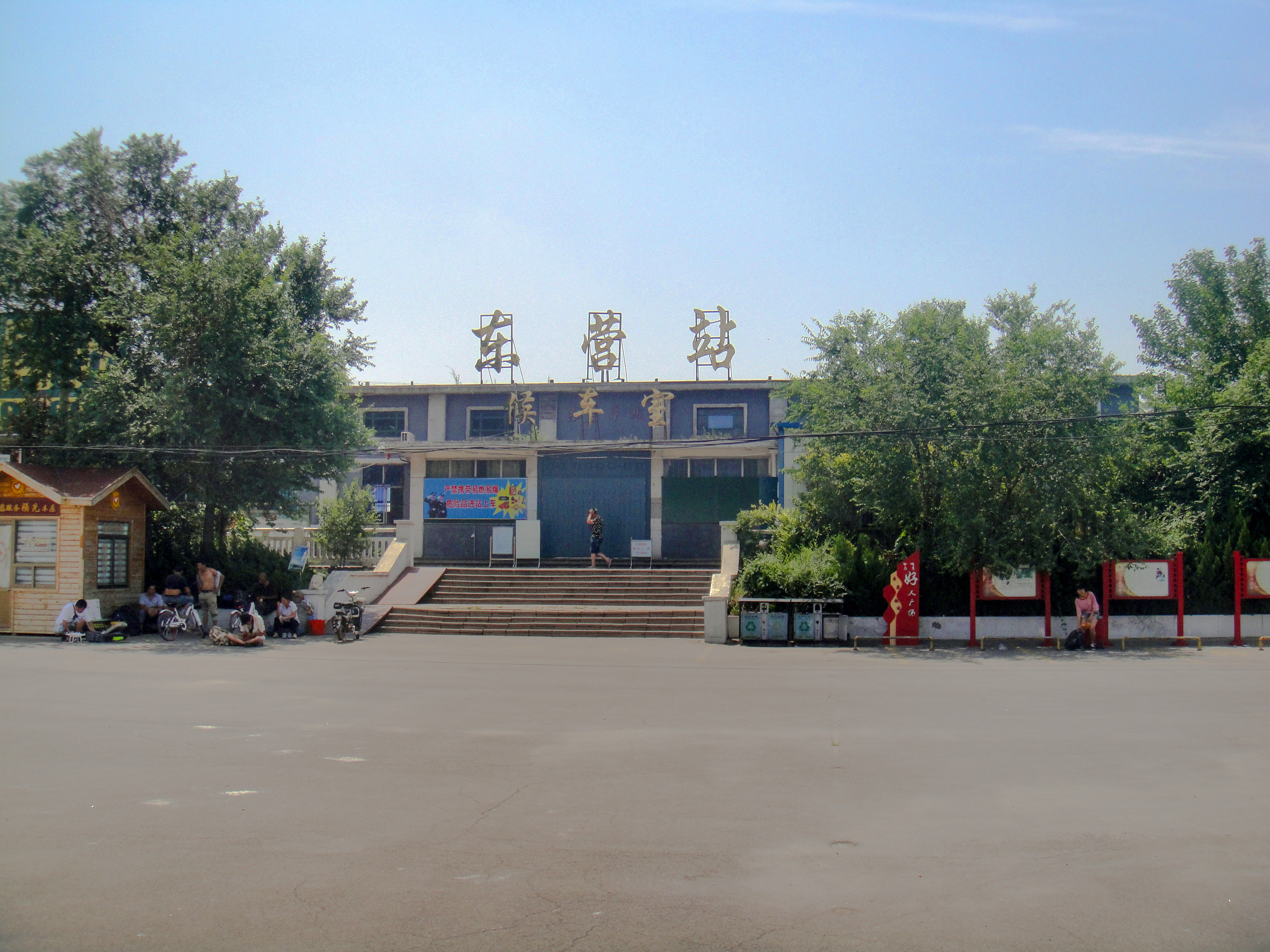

General information
- Location: Dongying District, Dongying, Shandong; China
- Coordinates: 37.4545°N 118.4664°E
- Line: Zibo–Dongying railway

History
- Opened: 1972
Location

Dongying railway station (Chinese: 东营站) is a railway station in Dongying District, Dongying, Shandong, China. It is the terminus of the Zibo–Dongying railway. The station handles both passengers and freight.

== History ==
The station opened with the Zibo–Dongying railway in 1972. Work on upgrading the station began on 9 July 2021.

== See also ==
- Dongying South railway station
