= Lijin County =

Lijin County 利津县 Litsing
- County
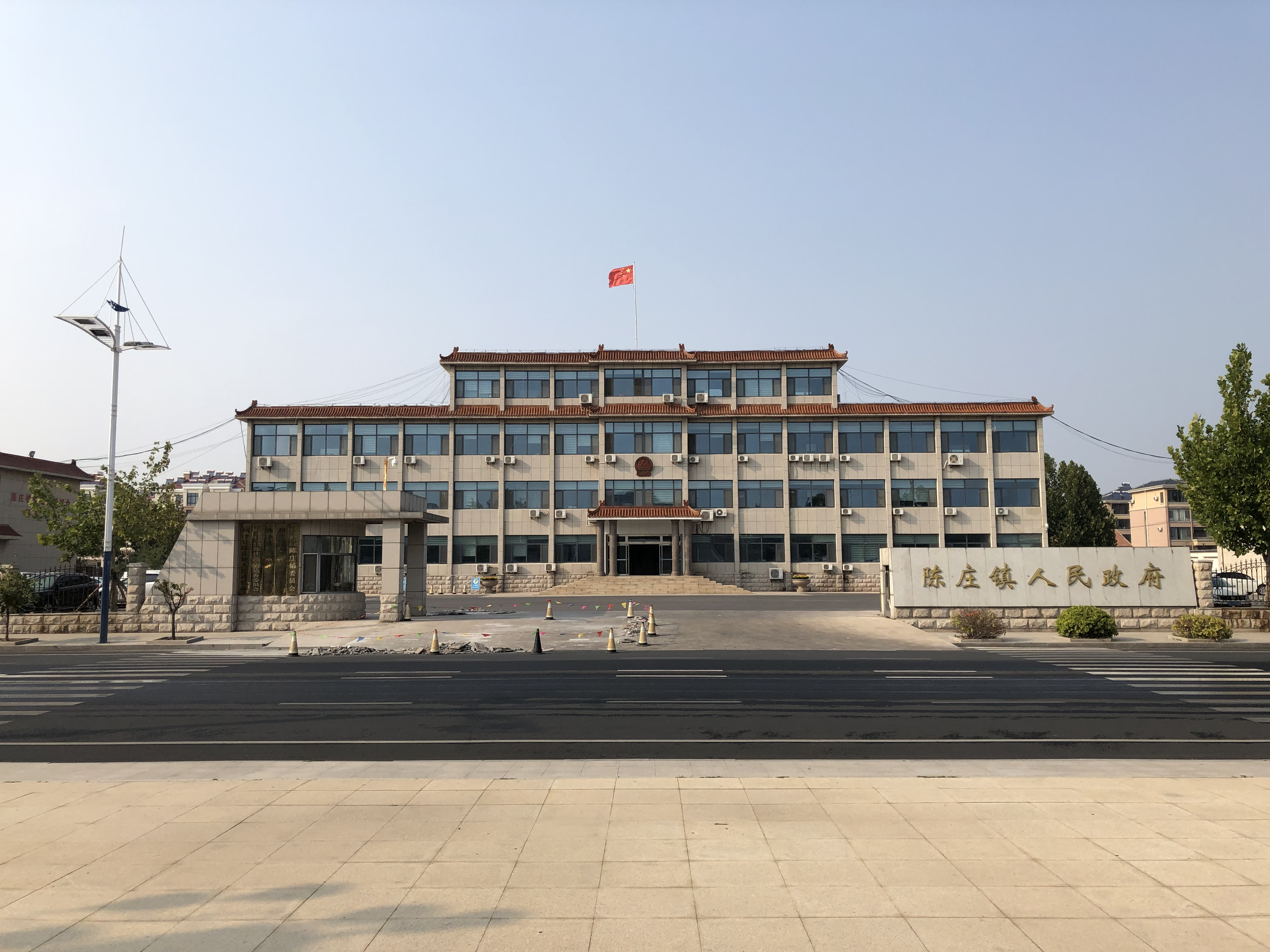
- Municipal Hall of Chenzhuang

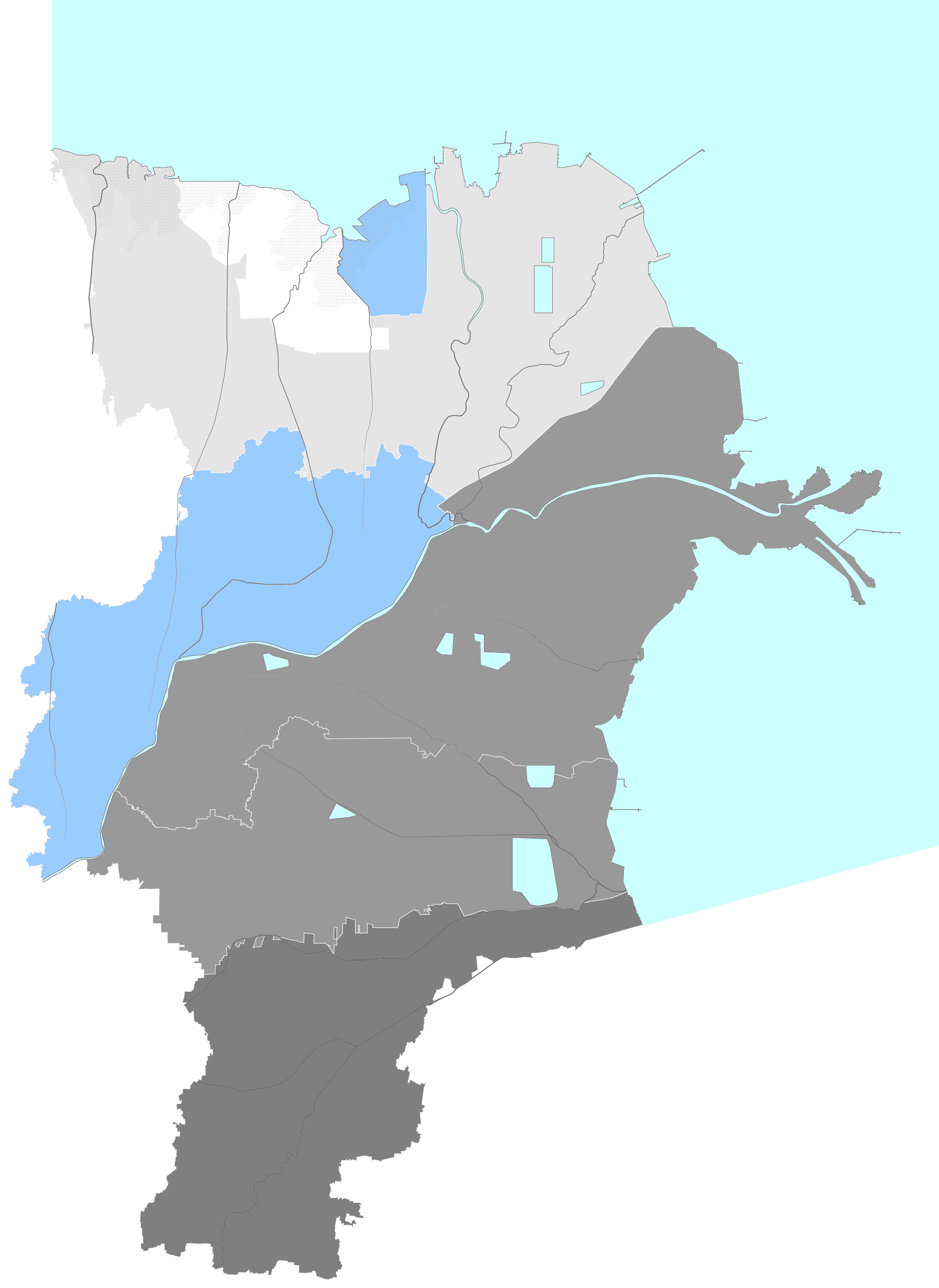
- Location in Dongying

- Location of the seat in Shandong
- Coordinates: 37°29′N 118°15′E
- Country: People's Republic of China
- Province: Shandong
- Prefecture-level city: Dongying

Area
  - Total: 1,665.6 km^{2} (643.1 sq mi)
- Elevation: 9.4 m (31 ft)

Population (2018)
  - Total: 299,100
  - Density: 179.6/km^{2} (465.1/sq mi)
- Time zone: UTC+8 (China Standard)
- Postal code: 257000

Lijin County (simplified Chinese: 利津县; traditional Chinese: 利津縣; pinyin: Lìjīn Xiàn) is a county of Shandong province, People's Republic of China, situated on the northwestern (left) bank of the Yellow River. It is under the administration of Dongying City.

The population in 1999 was 289,593.

== Administrative divisions ==
As of 2012, this county is divided to 5 towns and 4 townships.

Towns

- Lijin (利津镇)
- Beisong (北宋镇)
- Yanwo (盐窝镇)
- Chenzhuang (陈庄镇)
- Tingluo (汀罗镇)

Townships

- Mingji Township (明集乡)
- Beiling Township (北岭乡)
- Hutan Township (虎滩乡)
- Diaokou Township (刁口乡)

== Climate ==
Climate data for Lijin, elevation 12 m (39 ft), (1991–2020 normals, extremes 1991–present)
Month	Jan	Feb	Mar	Apr	May	Jun	Jul	Aug	Sep	Oct	Nov	Dec	Year
Record high °C (°F)	17.6 (63.7)	23.2 (73.8)	31.1 (88.0)	34.4 (93.9)	39.2 (102.6)	40.7 (105.3)	38.9 (102.0)	38.6 (101.5)	35.7 (96.3)	31.1 (88.0)	25.3 (77.5)	16.3 (61.3)	40.7 (105.3)
Mean daily maximum °C (°F)	3.1 (37.6)	6.8 (44.2)	13.6 (56.5)	20.8 (69.4)	26.7 (80.1)	30.8 (87.4)	31.8 (89.2)	30.5 (86.9)	27.1 (80.8)	20.7 (69.3)	12.2 (54.0)	4.8 (40.6)	19.1 (66.3)
Daily mean °C (°F)	−2.1 (28.2)	1.1 (34.0)	7.4 (45.3)	14.4 (57.9)	20.8 (69.4)	25.1 (77.2)	27.1 (80.8)	26.0 (78.8)	21.7 (71.1)	14.8 (58.6)	6.7 (44.1)	−0.1 (31.8)	13.6 (56.4)
Mean daily minimum °C (°F)	−5.8 (21.6)	−3.0 (26.6)	2.4 (36.3)	8.9 (48.0)	15.2 (59.4)	20.0 (68.0)	23.1 (73.6)	22.3 (72.1)	17.3 (63.1)	10.1 (50.2)	2.5 (36.5)	−3.8 (25.2)	9.1 (48.4)
Record low °C (°F)	−18.8 (−1.8)	−14.1 (6.6)	−7.9 (17.8)	−1.9 (28.6)	6.4 (43.5)	10.3 (50.5)	16.8 (62.2)	12.9 (55.2)	8.5 (47.3)	−0.9 (30.4)	−9.1 (15.6)	−16.8 (1.8)	−18.8 (−1.8)
Average precipitation mm (inches)	5.1 (0.20)	8.6 (0.34)	8.5 (0.33)	27.9 (1.10)	45.6 (1.80)	75.6 (2.98)	161.4 (6.35)	148.9 (5.86)	39.2 (1.54)	23.2 (0.91)	20.8 (0.82)	5.1 (0.20)	569.9 (22.43)
Average precipitation days (≥ 0.1 mm)	2.2	3.2	3.1	5.5	5.9	8.0	10.6	9.8	6.1	5.4	4.0	3.1	66.9
Average snowy days	3.1	3.1	1.2	0.1	0	0	0	0	0	0	0.7	2.4	10.6
Average relative humidity (%)	61	57	52	53	57	62	74	77	71	65	63	61	63
Mean monthly sunshine hours	176.1	179.2	233.9	254.9	282.4	253.6	221.6	221.9	219.1	208.5	175.9	170.0	2,597.1
Percentage possible sunshine	57	58	63	64	64	58	50	53	59	61	58	57	59
Source: China Meteorological Administrationall-time extreme temperatureall-time August high
