= Dongying Shengli Airport =

Dongying Shengli Airport 东营胜利机场
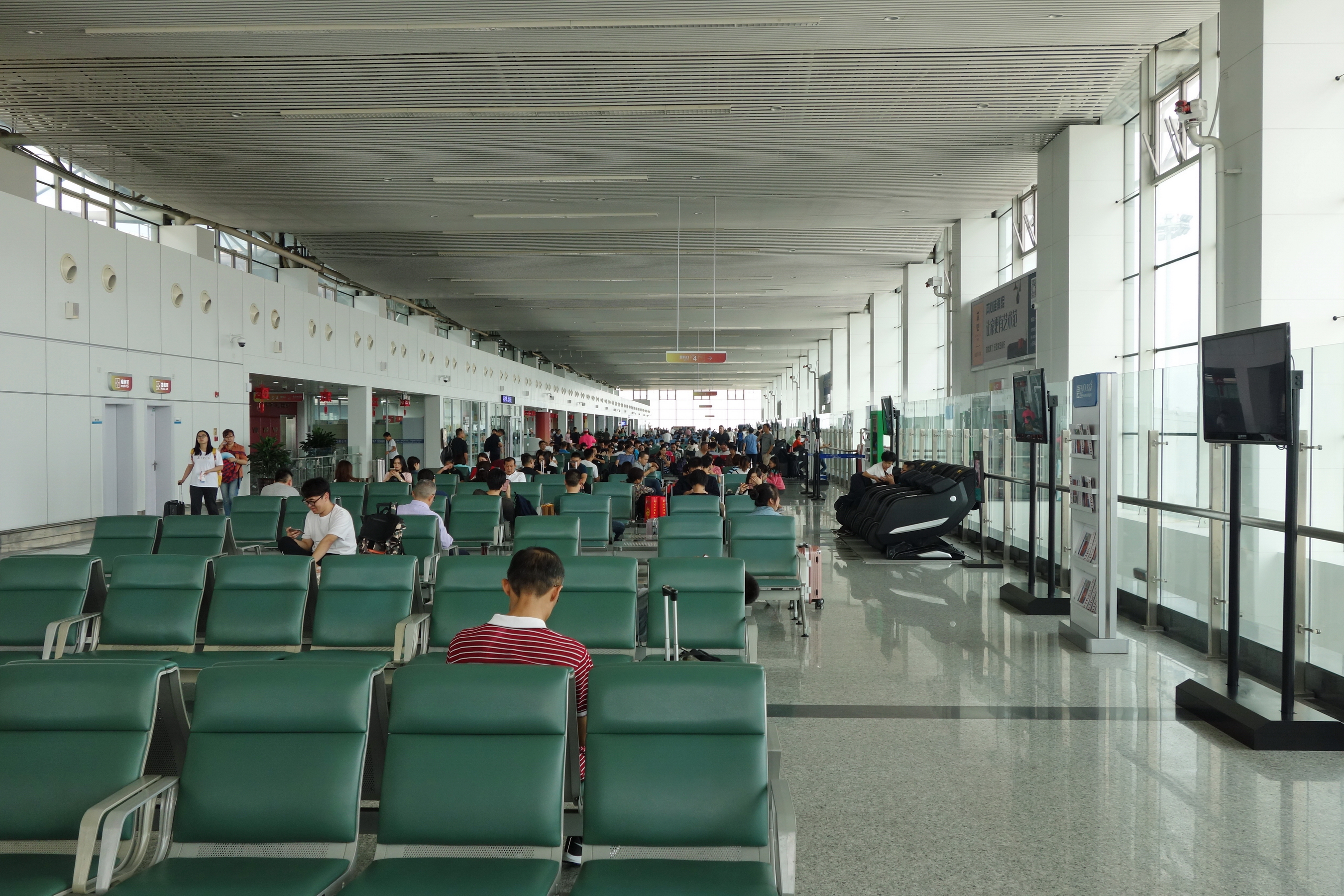
- IATA: DOY; ICAO: ZSDY

Summary
- Airport type: Public
- Operator: Dongying Shengli Airport Management Co.
- Serves: Dongying, Shandong, China
- Location: Yong'an Town, Dongying
- Coordinates: 37°30′37″N 118°47′04″E

Map
- Location of airport in Shandong

Runways
Direction	Length		Surface
Direction	m	ft	Surface
18/36	3,600	11,811	Concrete

Statistics (2025)
- Passengers: 1,300,766
- Aircraft movements: 41,675
- Cargo (metric tons): 1,315.8
- Source: CAAC

Dongying Shengli Airport
- Simplified Chinese: 东营胜利机场
- Traditional Chinese: 東營勝利機場
Transcriptions
Standard Mandarin
- Hanyu Pinyin: Dōngyíng Shènglì Jīchǎng

Dongying Shengli Airport (IATA: DOY, ICAO: ZSDY) is an airport serving the city of Dongying in Shandong Province, China. It is located in the town of Yong'an, and was formerly called Dongying Yong'an Airport (Chinese: 东营永安机场). Construction of the airport was started in May 1984 and completed in October 1985. It was expanded in 2001 and again in 2010. Flights resumed on 28 February 2011 after the latest expansion was completed, and the airport adopted the new name Dongying Shengli Airport, after the Shengli Oil Field in Dongying.

== History ==
The history of Dongying Shengli Airport can be traced back to its predecessor, Dongying Yong'an Airport. Dongying Airport construction began in May 1984, with the first phase completed in October 1985.

In 1985, a modern 3,200-square-meter terminal building, flight control tower, and a series of auxiliary facilities were completed. The airport runway was 2,200 meters long and could accommodate aircraft up to the Boeing 737, McDonnell Douglas MD-11, and Airbus A320. Dongying Airport passed the inspection and acceptance organized by the Civil Aviation Administration of Shandong Province and the Civil Aviation Administration of East China, obtained an operating license, and met the national standards for airport operation. However, due to various reasons, the original airport remained closed after its completion.

On April 15, 1989, the Dongying Yong'an Airport reopening and renovation project was jointly approved by the State Council and the Central Military Commission.

In March 2001, the Dongying Municipal Government invested 78 million yuan to carry out the first renovation of the airport, which met the conditions for operation of a civil aviation transport airport and officially opened to traffic on this day in 2001. In April 2001, the Dongying Airport expansion project was re-initiated, and the expansion was completed in November 2001, officially opening the Dongying-Beijing route.

From 2007 to 2011, the Dongying Municipal Government invested another 930 million yuan in a second upgrade and renovation of Dongying Airport. A new 26,000-square-meter terminal building was constructed, the runway length was extended from 2,200 meters to 2,800 meters, and the flight area standards were upgraded from 4C to 4D. The airport was designed to handle 1 million passengers and 5,000 tons of cargo annually. After the new terminal building opened in 2011, passenger throughput reached 67,900, exceeding 50,000 for the first time in its history.

On June 27, 2014, COMAC and the Dongying Municipal People's Government signed an agreement to establish a civil aircraft flight test base at Dongying Shengli Airport. The base was officially inaugurated in January 2016 and mainly undertakes high-risk flight test, training, and maintenance tasks for aircraft such as the C919 and ARJ21. It is an important civil aircraft flight test platform for COMAC.

In 2016, the Civil Aviation Administration of East China officially reviewed and approved the "Overall Plan for Dongying Shengli Airport (2015 Edition)". According to the supporting needs of COMAC civil aircraft test flights, the main modifications of this "Plan" compared with the 2007 version are extending the existing 2,800-meter runway and parallel taxiway to 3,600 meters to the south, and upgrading the supporting facilities such as communication, navigation, and lighting to meet the Category II instrument landing requirements; incorporating the COMAC Dongying civil aircraft test flight base project into the airport's overall plan, and reserving development space for the long-term construction of the test flight base; and planning to build a dedicated test flight runway 760 meters east of the existing runway in the long term to solve the problem that the civil aviation transport runway could not meet the special technical requirements of test flights.

On February 1, 2018, with the successful landing of flight HO1173 from Shanghai Pudong Airport in Dongying, the 3,600-meter runway and its supporting facilities at Dongying Shengli Airport were successfully put into use, marking the official opening of the 3,600-meter runway at Dongying Shengli Airport.

In 2025, the airport's annual passenger throughput will exceed 1.3 million, and its cargo and mail throughput will exceed 1,300 tons, representing year-on-year increases of 11.8% and 18.8%, respectively. Both figures will set new records since the airport opened.

== Facilities ==
After the 2010 expansion the airport has been upgraded from class 4C to 4D, with a 2,800-meter runway, and a 25,380-square-meter terminal building. It is projected to handle one million passengers annually by 2020.

== Airlines and destinations ==
Airlines	Destinations
Air China	Chengdu–Tianfu, Harbin
China Eastern Airlines	Wuhan, Xi'an
China Express Airlines	Chongqing, Quzhou, Tianjin, Zhengzhou
China United Airlines	Beijing–Daxing, Wenzhou
Hainan Airlines	Beijing–Capital, Dalian, Guangzhou
Loong Air	Hangzhou
Shandong Airlines	Shenyang, Xiamen
Spring Airlines	Changchun, Fuzhou, Shanghai–Hongqiao, Shanghai–Pudong, Shenyang, Shenzhen

== See also ==
- List of airports in China
- List of the busiest airports in China
