= Dezhou–Dajiawa railway =

Railway line in China

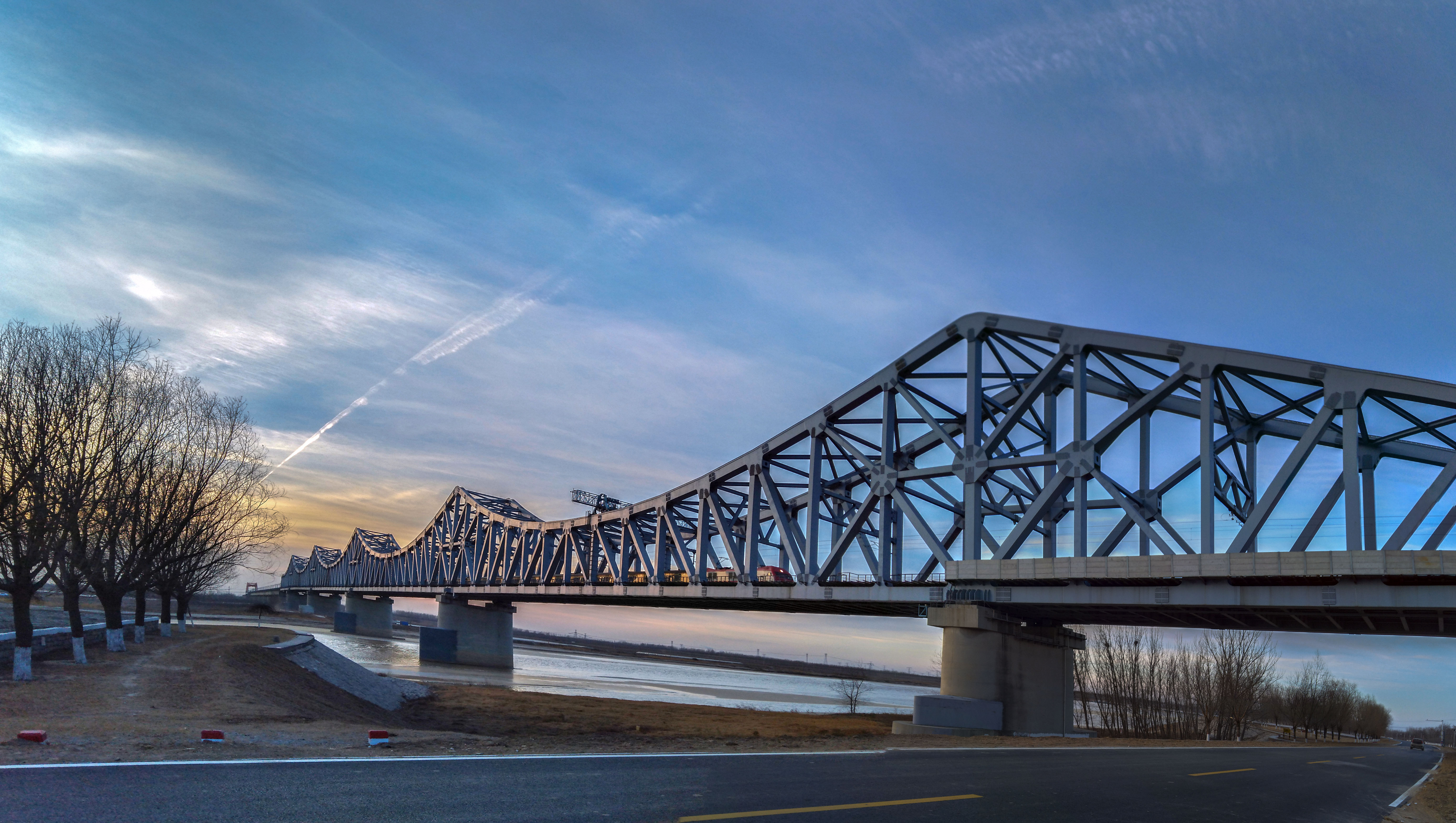
- The railway crossing the Yellow River

Overview
- Native name: 德大铁路
- Status: Operational
- Termini: Dezhou; Dajiawa (freight) Dongying South (passenger)
- Stations: 8 (passenger)

Service
- Type: Heavy rail

History
- Opened: 28 September 2015

Technical
- Line length: 255.6 km (159 mi)
- Track gauge: 1,435 mm (4 ft 8 1/2 in) standard gauge
- Electrification: 50 Hz 25,000 V

The Dezhou–Dajiawa railway is a single-track electrified railway line in China. The combined passenger and freight line is 255.6 kilometres (158.8 mi) long. Passenger services currently operate between Dezhou and Dongying South, the section from Dongying South to Dajiawa is only used by freight trains.

== History ==
Construction on the line began in November 2009. The line was built as a joint project between the Ministry of Railways and Shandong Province.

The railway opened with the first passenger services on 28 September 2015. Freight operation began in 2017.

== Route ==
The line departs from the Beijing–Shanghai railway south of Dezhou and heads east. There are several branches, including a chord which leads on to the Zibo–Dongying railway heading north towards Dongying. It crosses the Yellow River east of Binzhou. At Dajiawa, the line continues east as the freight-only Dajiawa–Laizhou–Longkou railway.

The line is used for coal transportation to a plant near Binzhou.
