= Dongying, Dongying =

Dongying District 东营区
- District
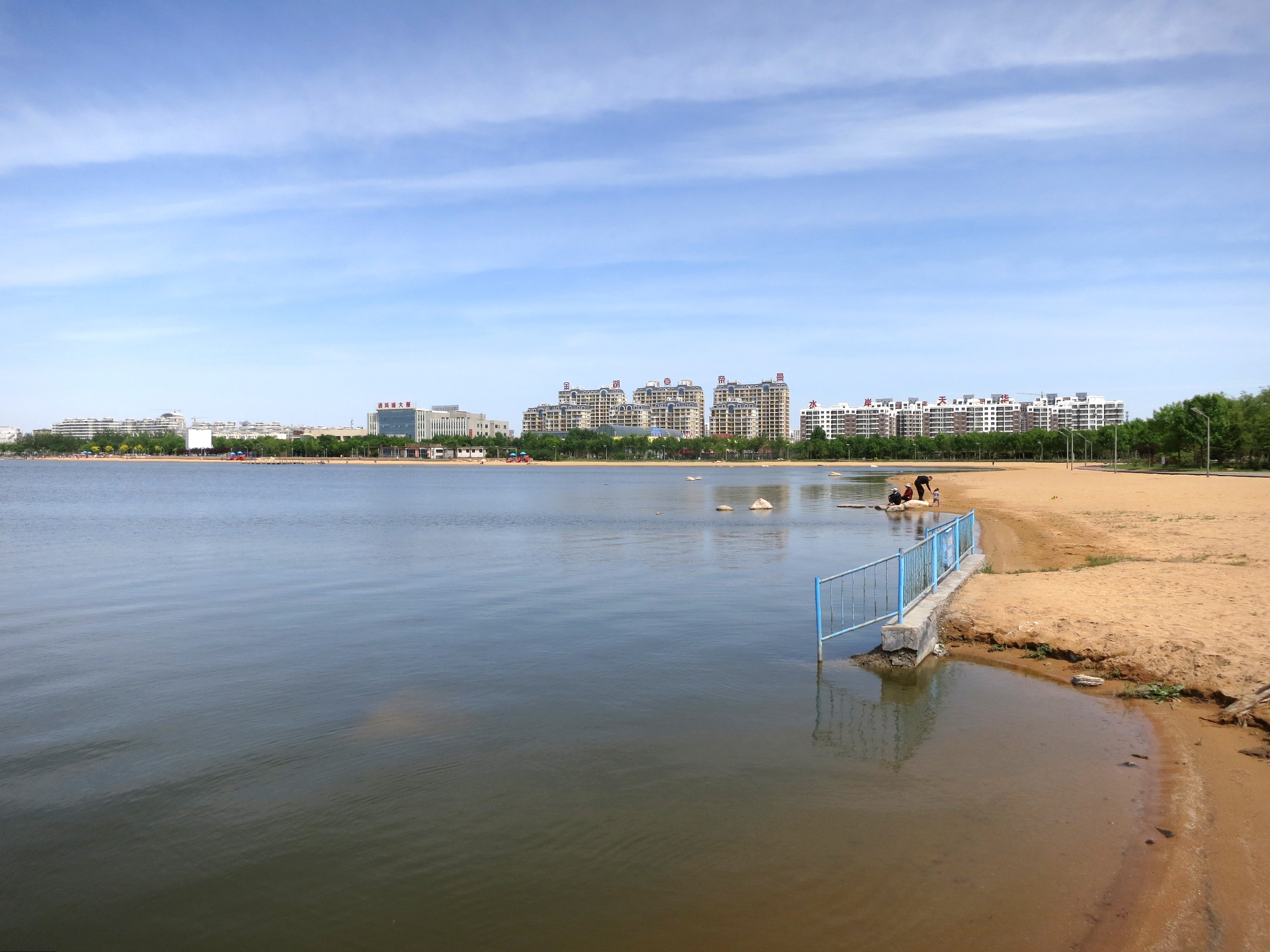
- Qingfeng Lake

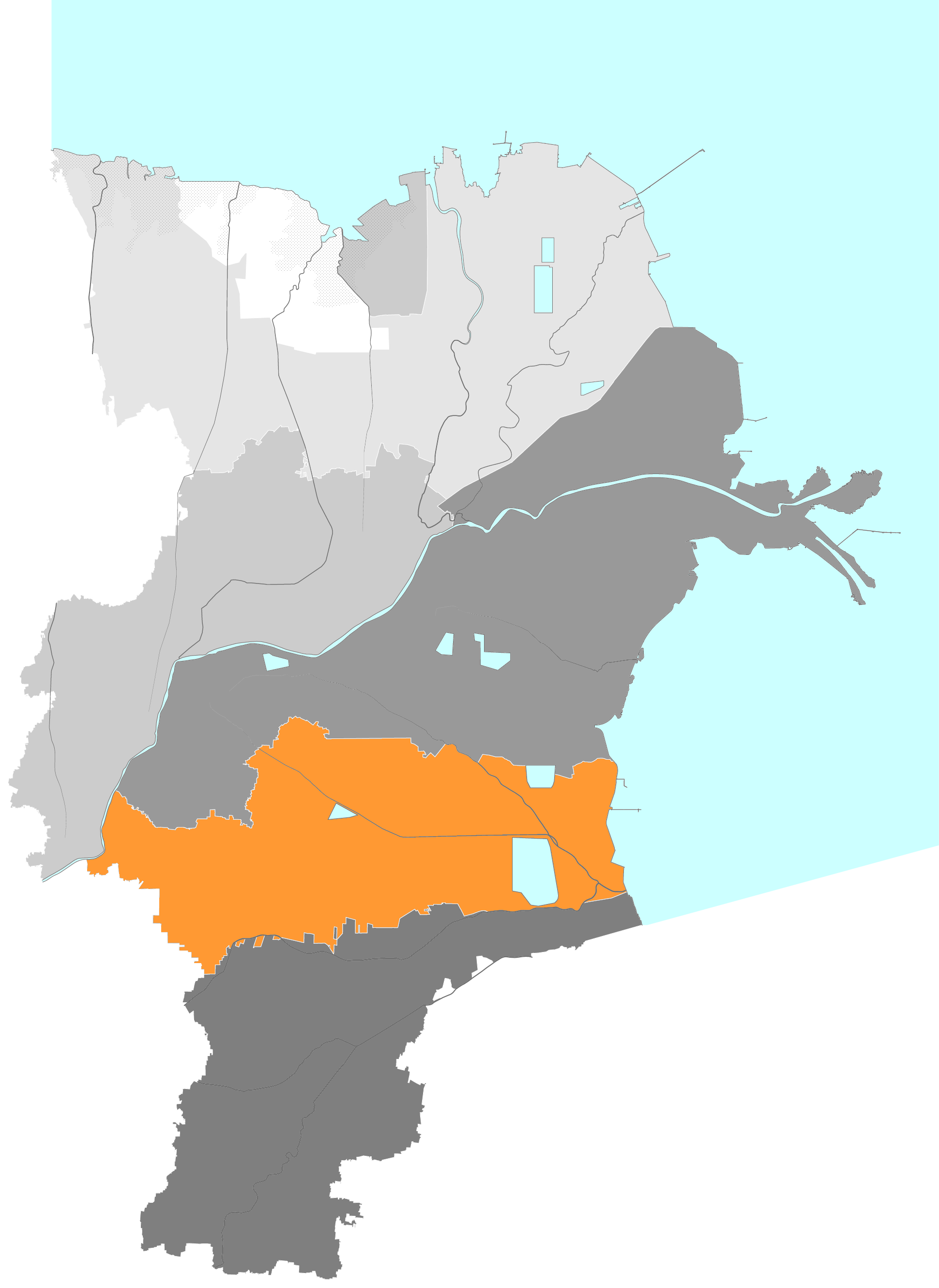
- Location in Dongying City

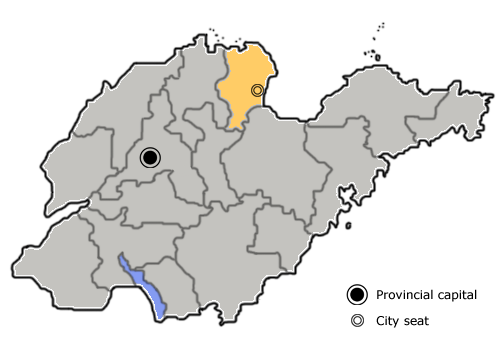
- Dongying City in Shandong
- Coordinates: 37°23′16″N 118°35′49″E
- Country: People's Republic of China
- Province: Shandong
- Prefecture-level city: Dongying

Area
  - Total: 1,155.62 km^{2} (446.19 sq mi)

Population (2019)
  - Total: 517,800
  - Density: 448.1/km^{2} (1,160/sq mi)
- Time zone: UTC+8 (China Standard)
- Postal code: 257029
- Division code: DYQ

Dongying (simplified Chinese: 东营区; traditional Chinese: 東營區; pinyin: Dōngyíng Qū) is a district and the seat of Dongying in the Chinese province of Shandong. Dongying has an area of 1,155 km^{2} (446 sq mi) and around 570,000 inhabitants.

== Administrative divisions ==
As of 2012, this district is divided to 6 subdistricts and 4 towns.

Subdistricts

- Wenhui Subdistrict (文汇街道)
- Huanghe Road Subdistrict (黄河路街道)
- Dongcheng Subdistrict (东城街道)
- Xindian Subdistrict (辛店街道)
- Shengli Subdistrict (胜利街道)
- Shengyuan Subdistrict (胜园街道)

Towns

- Niuzhuang (牛庄镇)
- Liuhu (六户镇)
- Shikou (史口镇)
- Longju (龙居镇)
