= Huanghua–Dajiawa railway =

Railway line in China

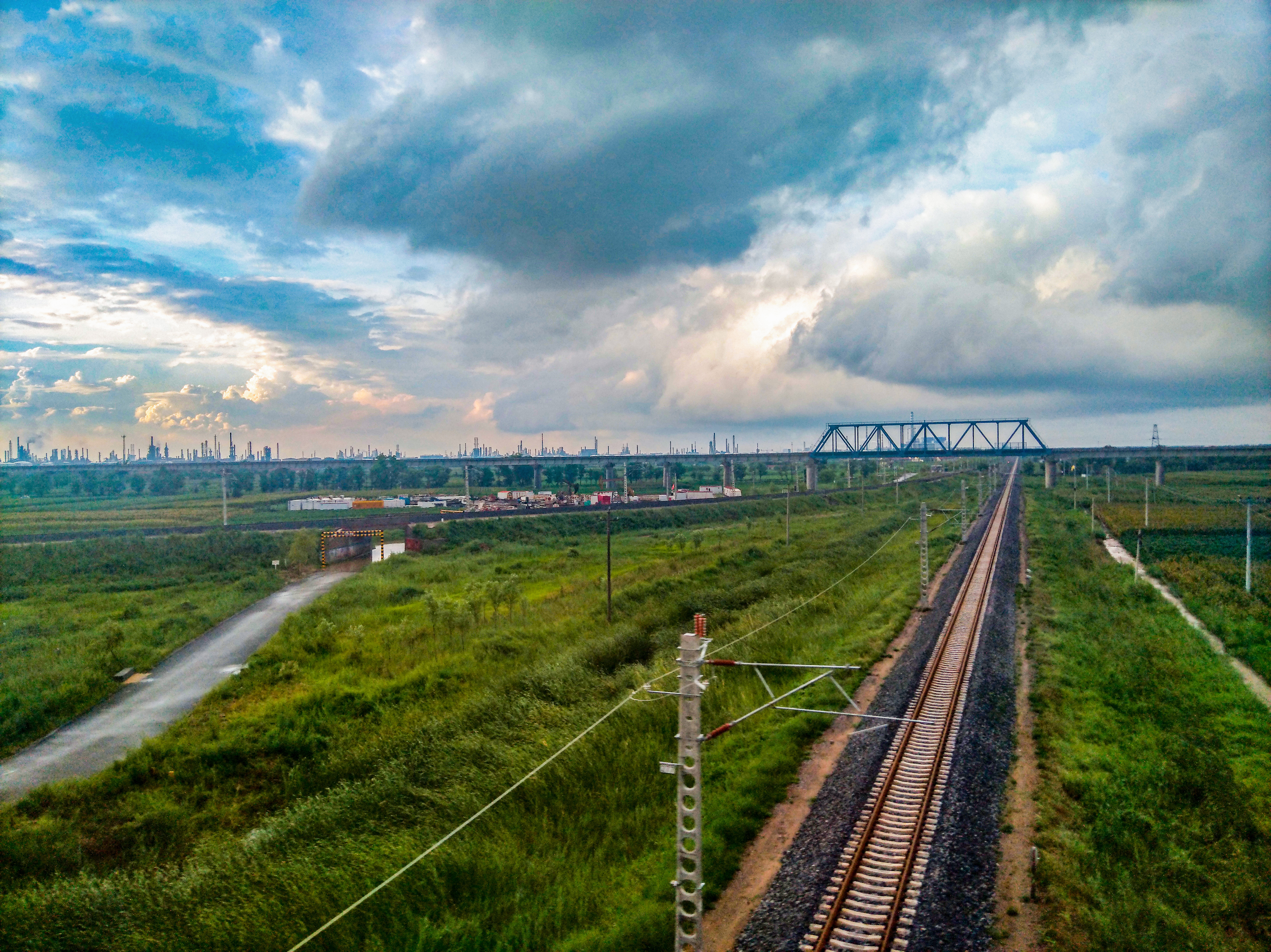
- Huangda Railway 2018

Overview
- Native name: 黄大铁路
- Status: Operational
- Termini: Huanghua South; Dajiawa

Service
- Type: Freight rail

History
- Opened: 26 December 2020

Technical
- Line length: 216.8 km (135 mi)
- Track gauge: 1,435 mm (4 ft 8 1/2 in) standard gauge
- Electrification: 50 Hz 25,000 V

The Dezhou–Dajiawa railway is a single-track electrified railway line in China. It opened on 26 December 2020 and is used for the transportation of coal.

== History ==
Construction on the line began on 13 September 2014. At the time, it was expected to open in September 2017.
